= Controlled-access highway =

Highway designed for high-speed, regulated traffic flow

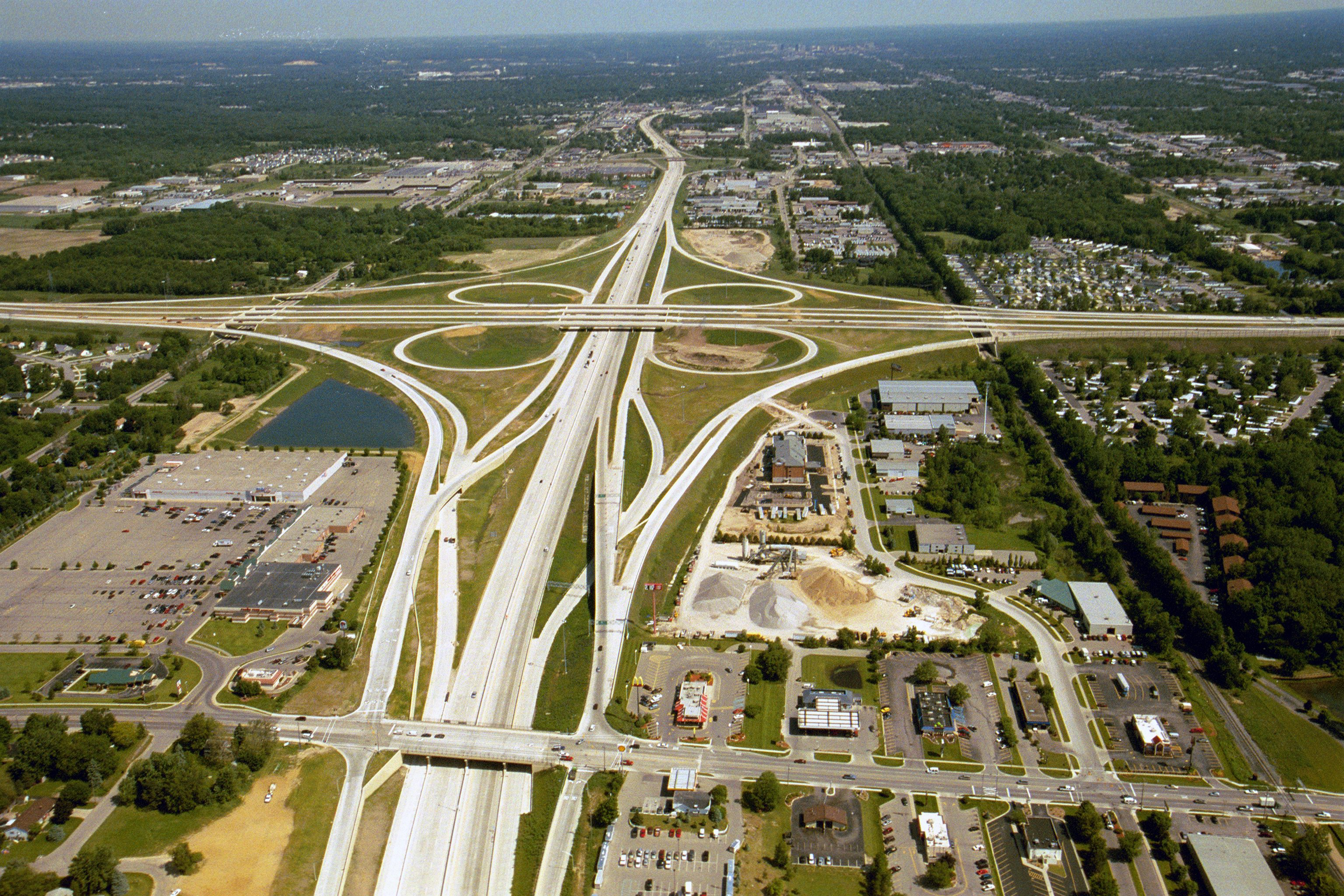
The cloverleaf interchange between US 131, M-6 and 68th Street in Cutlerville, Michigan, United States, shows many of the features of controlled-access highways: entry and exit ramps, median strips for opposing traffic, no at-grade intersections and no direct access to properties.

This sign, or some variation thereof, is used to denote controlled-access highways in many countries.

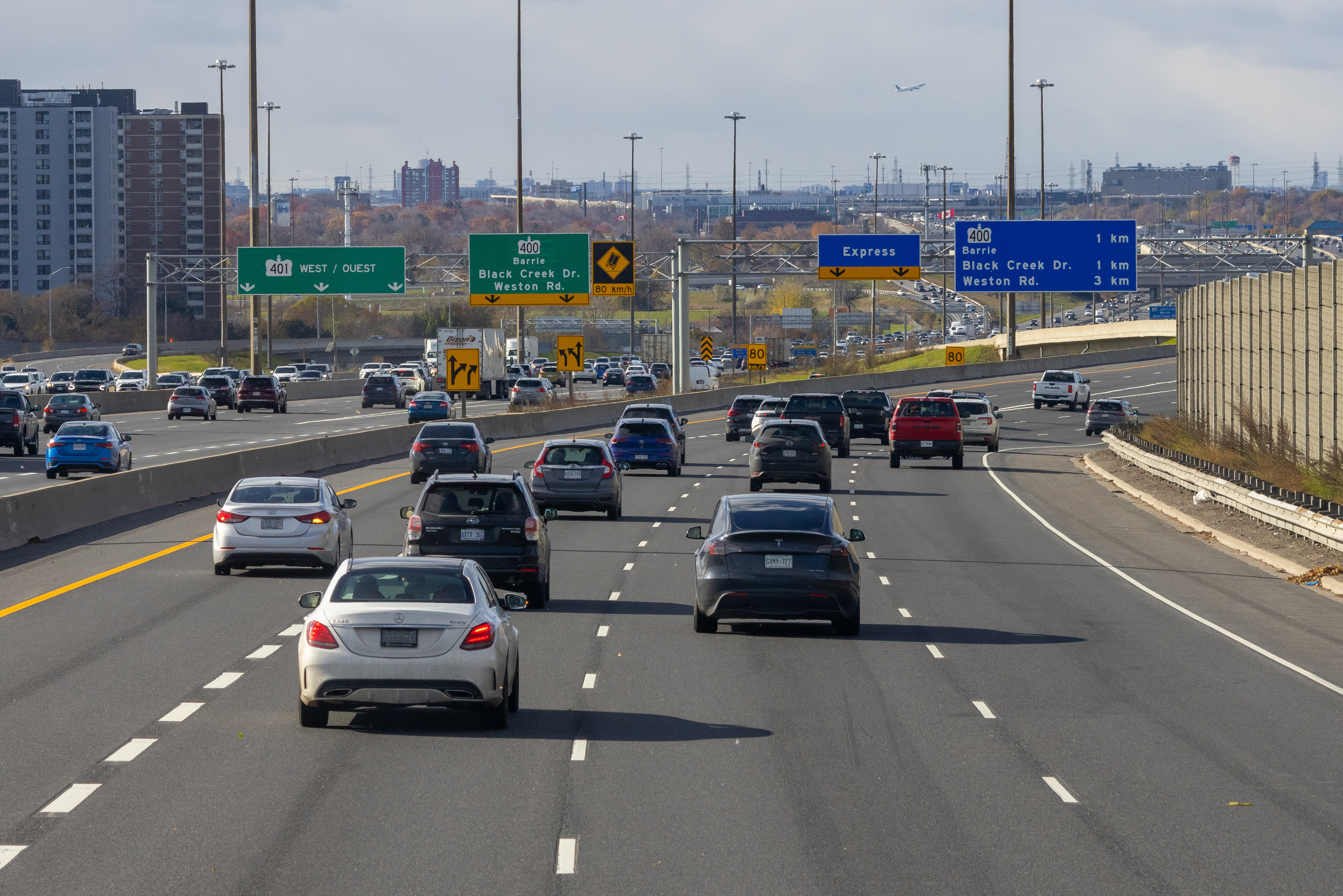
Typical overhead signage on Ontario's King's Highway network featuring an airport pictogram, distances to upcoming interchanges, and lane guidance. These signs have a blue background rather than the usual green to denote the local-express lanes.

A controlled-access highway is a type of highway that has been designed for high-speed vehicular traffic, with all traffic flow—ingress and egress—regulated. Common English terms are freeway, (Note: Used in the western part of the United States, parts of Australia, parts of Canada, and South Africa.) motorway, (Note: Used in the United Kingdom, Hong Kong, Ireland, Pakistan, New Zealand, and parts of Australia.) and expressway. (Note: Used in parts of the United States, parts of Canada, Australia, China, India, Japan, the Philippines, South Korea, and an official term in the UK and Hong Kong. In some parts of the United States, this also designates a type of limited-access road of lower class than a freeway. In the UK it officially refers to main roads of a lower class than a motorway. Depending on the region, the term is also often applied to limited-access roads, sometimes combining them with controlled-access highways into a single category.) Other similar terms include throughway or thruway (Note: Columbia Guide to Standard American English: "Thruway is the Standard spelling of the word meaning a 'high-speed, limited access, multiple-lane highway. [...] Throughway is a variant.") and parkway. Some of these may be limited-access highways, although this term can also refer to a class of highways with somewhat less isolation from other traffic.

In countries following the Vienna Convention, the motorway qualification implies that walking and parking are forbidden.

A fully controlled-access highway provides an unhindered flow of traffic, with no traffic signals, intersections or property access. They are free of any at-grade crossings with other roads, railways, or pedestrian paths, which are instead carried by overpasses and underpasses. Entrances and exits to the highway are provided at interchanges by slip roads (ramps), which allow for speed changes between the highway and arterials and collector roads. On the controlled-access highway, opposing directions of travel are generally separated by a median strip or central reservation containing a traffic barrier or grass. Elimination of conflicts with other directions of traffic dramatically improves safety, while increasing traffic capacity and speed.

Controlled-access highways evolved during the first half of the 20th century. Italy was the first country in the world to connect cities with controlled-access highways reserved for fast traffic and for motor vehicles only. Italy opened its first autostrada in 1924, A8, connecting Milan to Varese. Germany since 1907 planned and in 1913 had started to build the AVUS in Berlin, but this 'Automobile traffic and training road' was a closed circuit with two long straights where vehicles could reach their top speed twice before returning to the entrance. Opened in 1921 and mainly used for testing and racing for two decades, the AVUS was connected in 1940 to the nationwide network of Reichsautobahn roads that was proposed in the 1920s by various initiatives, delayed by the Great Depression and built in the 1930s with tax money. In 1932, the first controlled-access autobahn without speed limits was completed between the Western German cities of Cologne and Bonn. The 30 kilometres [19 mi] on what is now A555 was then referred to as a dual highway. With plans having been made earlier, Germany rapidly constructed the first nationwide system of such roads. The first North American freeways (known as parkways) opened in the New York City area in the 1920s. Britain, heavily influenced by the railways, did not build its first motorway, the Preston By-pass (M6), until 1958.

Most technologically advanced nations feature an extensive network of freeways or motorways to provide high-capacity urban travel, or high-speed rural travel, or both. Many have a national-level or even international-level (e.g. European E route) system of route numbering.

== Definition standards ==
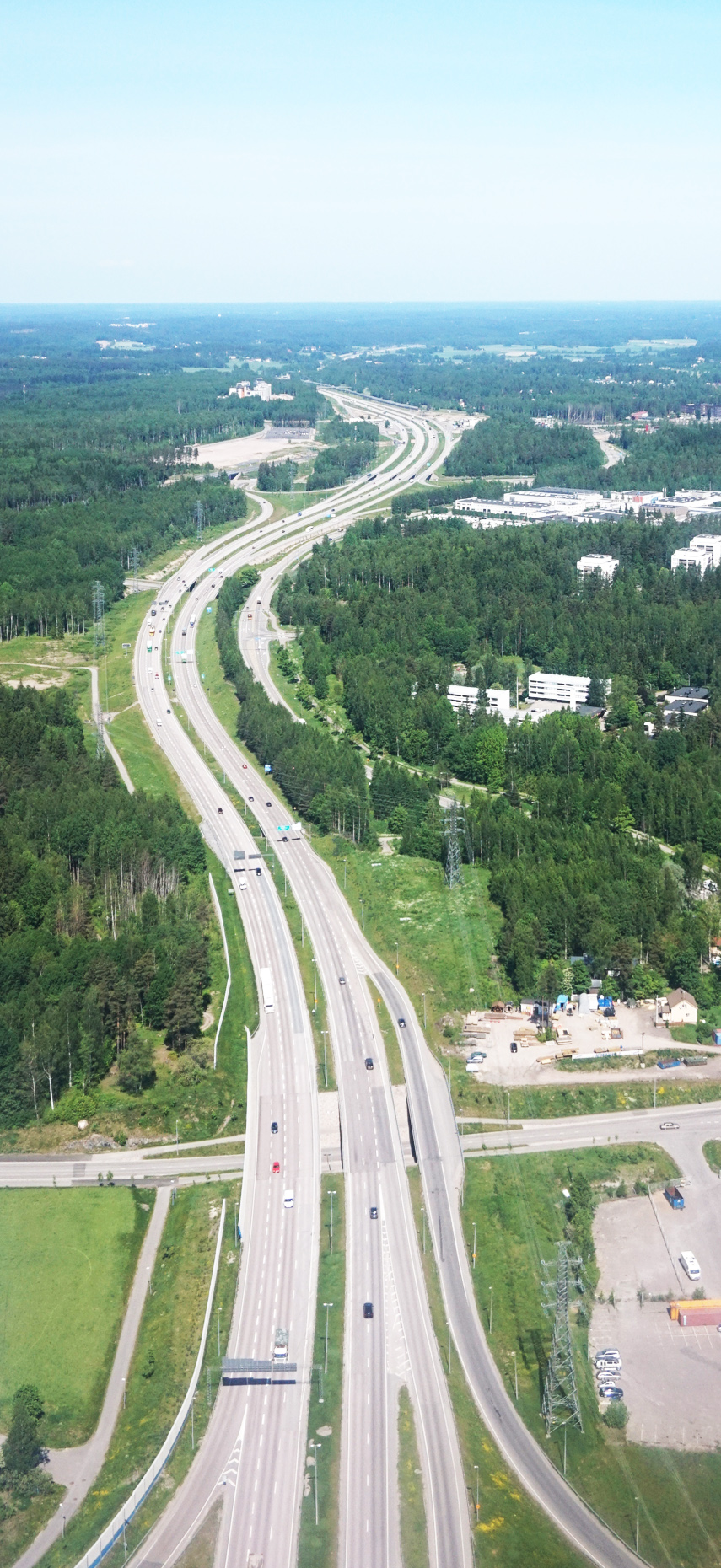
An aerial view of Finnish national road 3 (E12), a motorway between Tampere and Helsinki in Finland

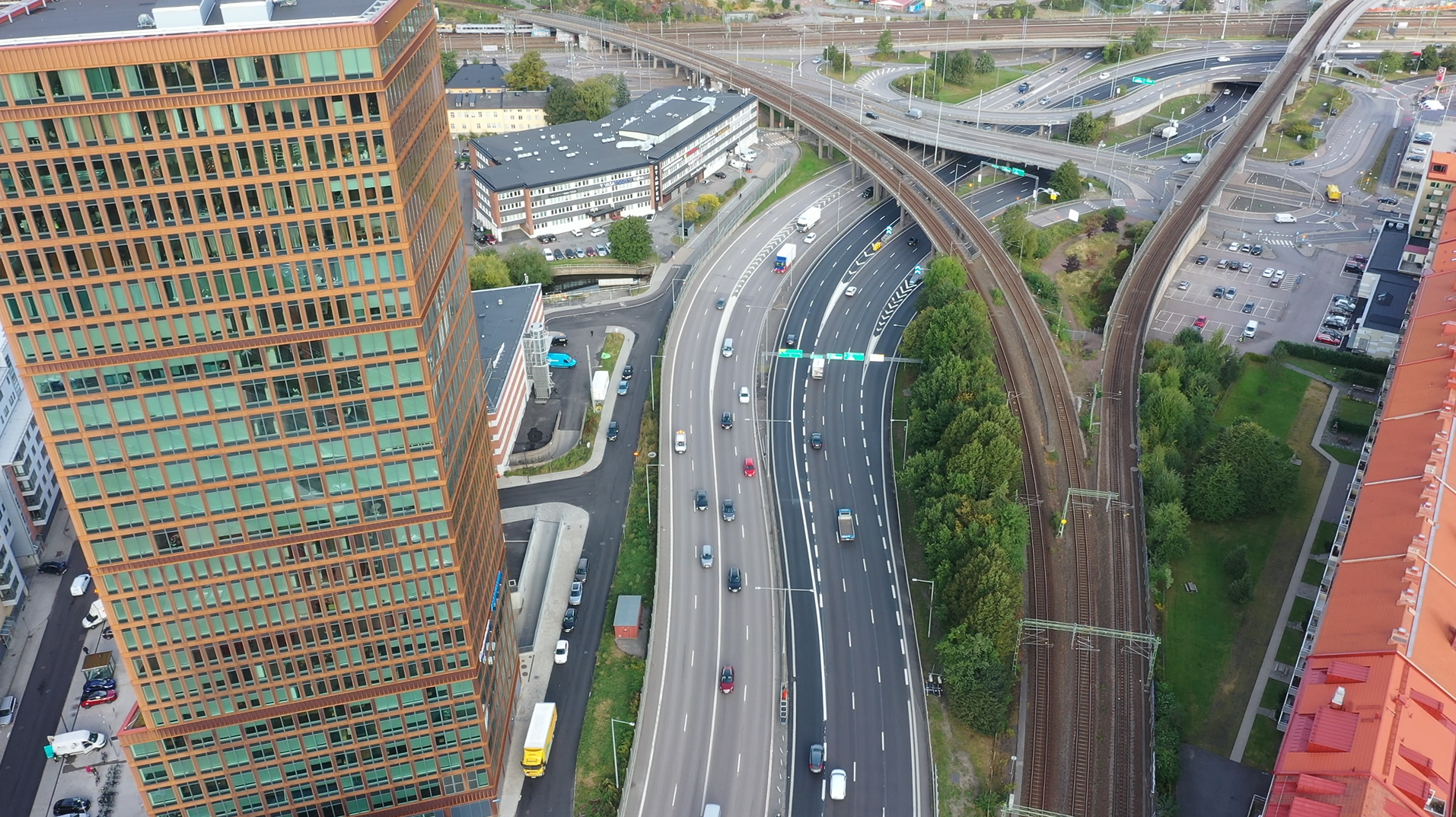
The west coast motorway E6/E20 in central Gothenburg, Sweden

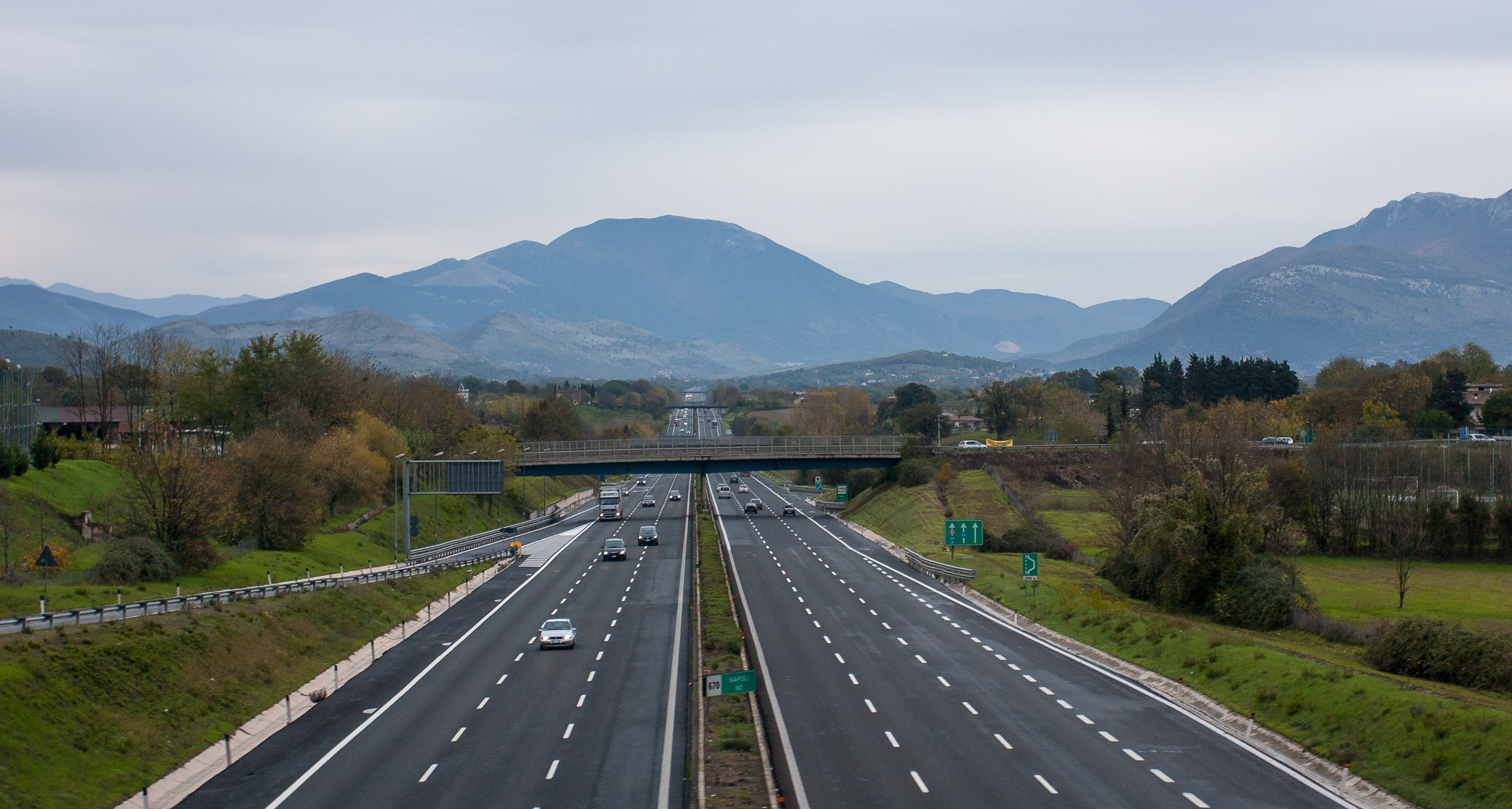
Autostrada A1 (E35/E45) runs through Italy linking some of the largest cities of the country: Milan, Bologna, Florence, Rome and Naples

There are several international standards that give some definitions of words such as motorways, but there is no formal definition of the English language words such as freeway, motorway, and expressway, or of the equivalent words in other languages such as autoroute, Autobahn, autostrada, autocesta, autoput, that are accepted worldwide—in most cases these words are defined by local statute or design standards or regional international treaties. Descriptions that are widely used include:

Vienna Convention on Road Signs and Signals

"Motorway" means a road specially designed and built for motor traffic that does not serve properties bordering on it, and that:

1. Is provided, except at special points or temporarily, with separate carriageways for the two directions of traffic, separated from each other either by a dividing strip not intended for traffic or, exceptionally, by other means;
2. Does not cross at level with any road, railway or tramway track, or footpath; and,
3. Is specially sign-posted as a motorway;

One green or blue symbol (like or) appears at motorway entry in countries that follow the Vienna Convention. Exits are marked with another symbol: or.

The definitions of "motorway" from the OECD and PIARC are almost identical.

British Standards

Motorway: Limited-access dual carriageway road, not crossed on the same level by other traffic lanes, for the exclusive use of certain classes of motor vehicle.

ITE (including CITE)

Freeway: A divided major roadway with full control of access and with no crossings at grade. This definition applies to toll as well as toll-free roads.

Freeway A: This designates roadways with greater visual complexity and high traffic volumes. Usually this type of freeway will be found in metropolitan areas in or near the central core and will operate through much of the early evening hours of darkness at or near design capacity.
Freeway B: This designates all other divided roadways with full control of access where lighting is needed.

In the European Union, for statistical and safety purposes, some distinction might be made between motorway and expressway. For instance a principal arterial might be considered as:

Roads serving long distance and mainly interurban movements. Includes motorways (urban or rural) and expressways (road which does not serve properties bordering on it and which is provided with separate carriageways for the two directions of traffic). Principal arterials may cross through urban areas, serving suburban movements. The traffic is characterized by high speeds and full or partial access control (interchanges or junctions controlled by traffic lights). Other roads leading to a principal arterial are connected to it through side collector roads.

In this view, CARE's definition stands that a motorway is understood as a

public road with dual carriageways and at least two lanes each way. All entrances and exits are signposted and all interchanges are grade separated. Central barrier or median present throughout the road. No crossing is permitted, while stopping is permitted only in an emergency. Restricted access to motor vehicles, prohibited to pedestrians, animals, pedal cycles, mopeds, agricultural vehicles. The minimum speed is not lower than 50 km/h [31 mph] and the maximum speed is not higher than 130 km/h [81 mph] (except Germany where no speed limit is defined).

Motorways are designed to carry heavy traffic at high speed with the lowest possible number of accidents. They are also designed to collect long-distance traffic from other roads, so that conflicts between long-distance traffic and local traffic are avoided. According to the common European definition, a motorway is defined as "a road, specially designed and built for motor traffic, which does not serve properties bordering on it, and which: (a) is provided, except at special points or temporarily, with separate carriageways for the two directions of traffic, separated from each other, either by a dividing strip not intended for traffic, or exceptionally by other means; (b) does not cross at level with any road, railway or tramway track, or footpath; (c) is specially sign-posted as a motorway and is reserved for specific categories of road motor vehicles." Urban motorways are also included in this definition. However, the respective national definitions and the type of roads covered may present slight differences in different EU countries.

== History ==
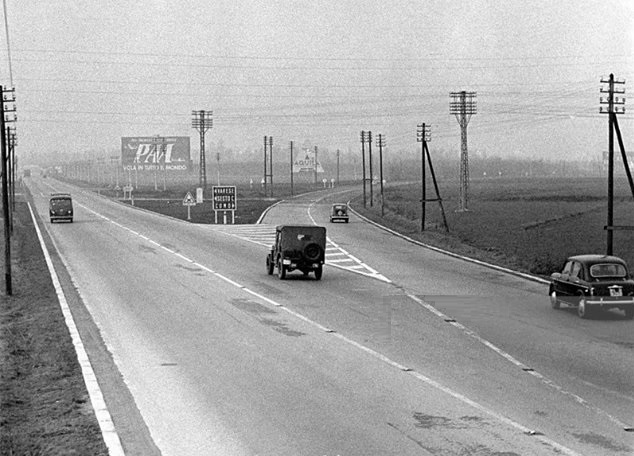
The Italian Autostrada dei Laghi ("Lakes Motorway" in the 1950s; now parts of the Autostrada A8 and the Autostrada A9), the first controlled-access highway ever built in the world

The first version of modern controlled-access highways evolved during the first half of the 20th century. The Long Island Motor Parkway on Long Island, New York, opened in 1908 as a private venture, was the world's first limited-access roadway. It included many modern features, including banked turns, guard rails and reinforced concrete tarmac. Traffic could turn left between the parkway and connectors, crossing oncoming traffic, so it was not a controlled-access highway (or "freeway" as later defined by the federal government's Manual on Uniform Traffic Control Devices).

Modern controlled-access highways originated in the early 1920s in response to the rapidly increasing use of the automobile, the demand for faster movement between cities and as a consequence of improvements in paving processes, techniques and materials. These original high-speed roads were referred to as "dual highways" and have been modernized and are still in use today.

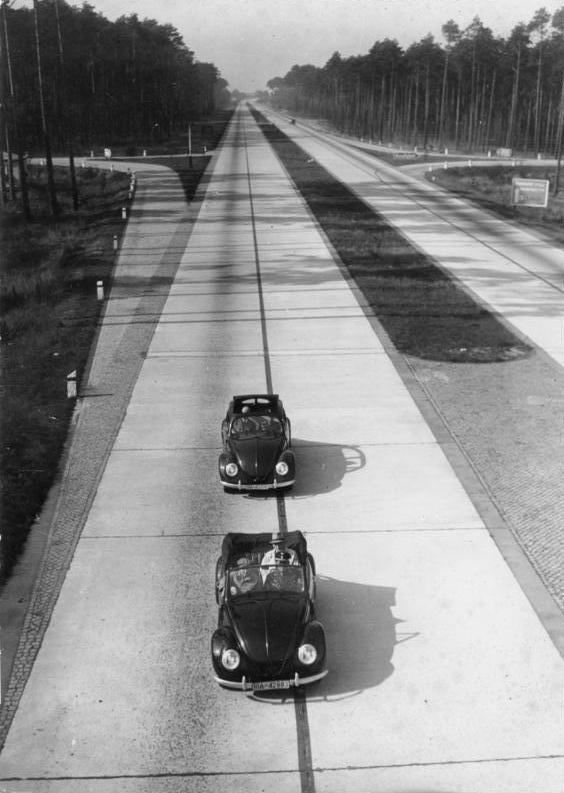
A section of the German Reichsautobahn in 1943, the first nationwide highway system.

Italy was the first country in the world to build controlled-access highways reserved for fast traffic and for motor vehicles only. The Autostrada dei Laghi ("Lakes Motorway") connected Milan to Lake Como and Lake Maggiore, and is now parts of the A8 and A9 motorways. It was devised by Piero Puricelli and was inaugurated in 1924. This motorway, called autostrada, contained only one lane in each direction and no interchanges. The Bronx River Parkway was the first road in North America to utilize a median strip to separate the opposing lanes, to be constructed through a park and where intersecting streets crossed over bridges. The Southern State Parkway opened in 1927, while the Long Island Motor Parkway was closed in 1937 and replaced by the Northern State Parkway (opened 1931) and the contiguous Grand Central Parkway (opened 1936). In Germany, construction of the Bonn-Cologne Autobahn began in 1929 and was opened in 1932 by Konrad Adenauer, then the mayor of Cologne. The German Autobahn became the first nationwide highway system.

In Canada, the first precursor with semi-controlled access was The Middle Road between Hamilton and Toronto, which featured a median divider between opposing traffic flow, as well as the nation's first cloverleaf interchange. This highway developed into the Queen Elizabeth Way, which featured a cloverleaf and trumpet interchange when it opened in 1937, and until the Second World War, boasted the longest illuminated stretch of roadway built. A decade later, the first section of Highway 401 was opened, based on earlier designs. It has since gone on to become the busiest highway in the world.

The word freeway was first used in February 1930 by Edward M. Bassett. Bassett argued that roads should be classified into three basic types: highways, parkways, and freeways. In Bassett's zoning and property law-based system, abutting property owners have the rights of light, air and access to highways, but not parkways and freeways; the latter two are distinguished in that the purpose of a parkway is recreation, while the purpose of a freeway is movement. Thus, as originally conceived, a freeway is simply a strip of public land devoted to movement to which abutting property owners do not have rights of light, air or access.

== Design ==
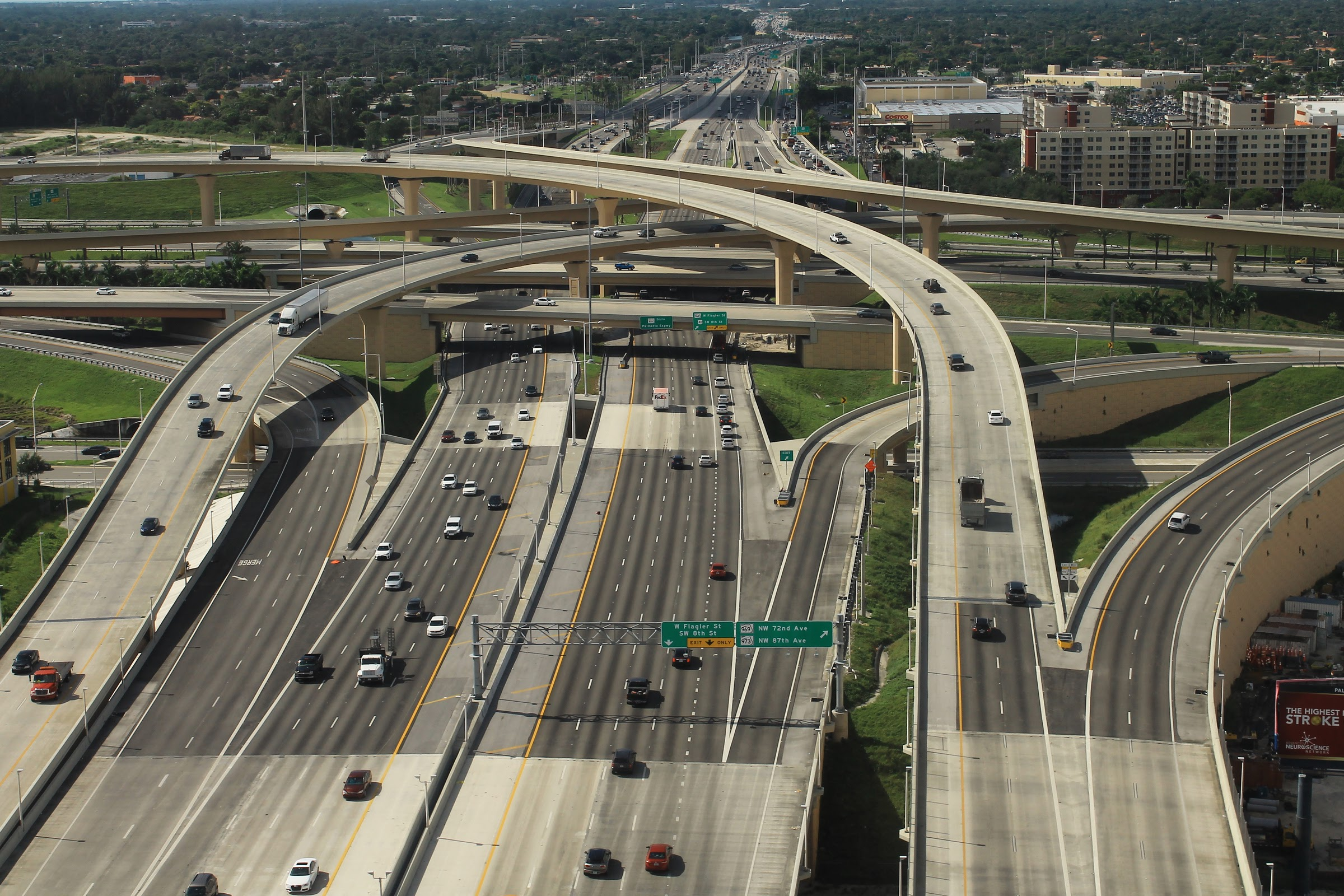
Highway interchange between the Dolphin Expressway and Palmetto Expressway (Dolphin–Palmetto Interchange) in Greater Miami, Florida, United States

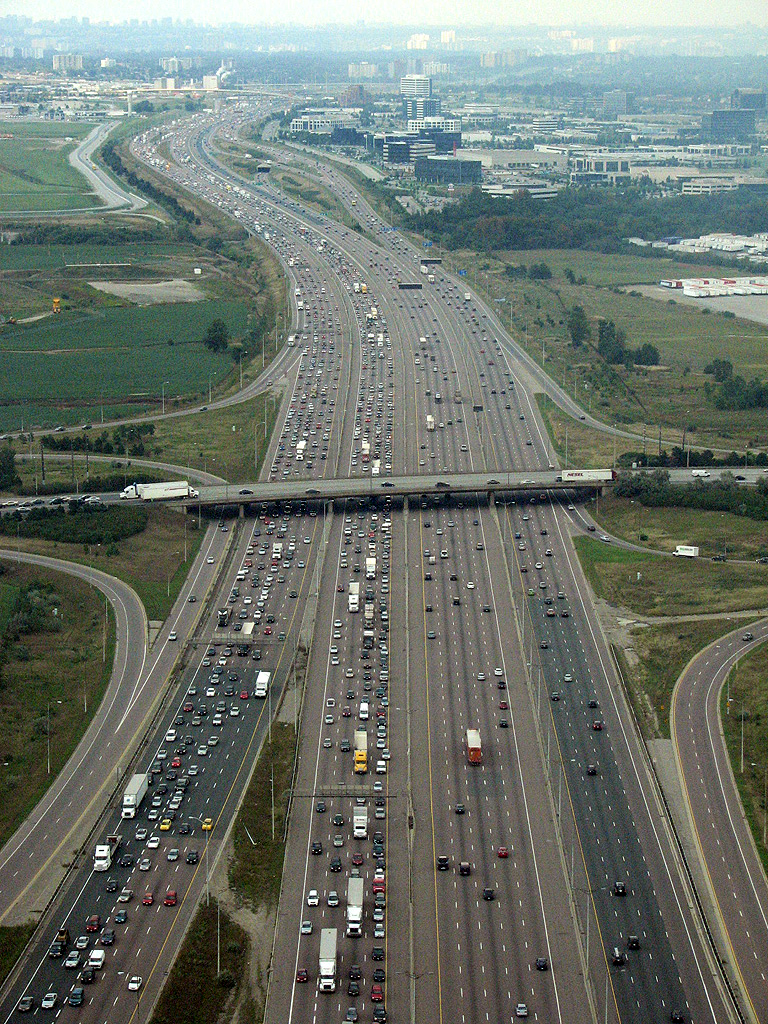
Highway 401 in Southern Ontario, Canada. An example of a collector-express freeway design, the route features four carriageways through Toronto.

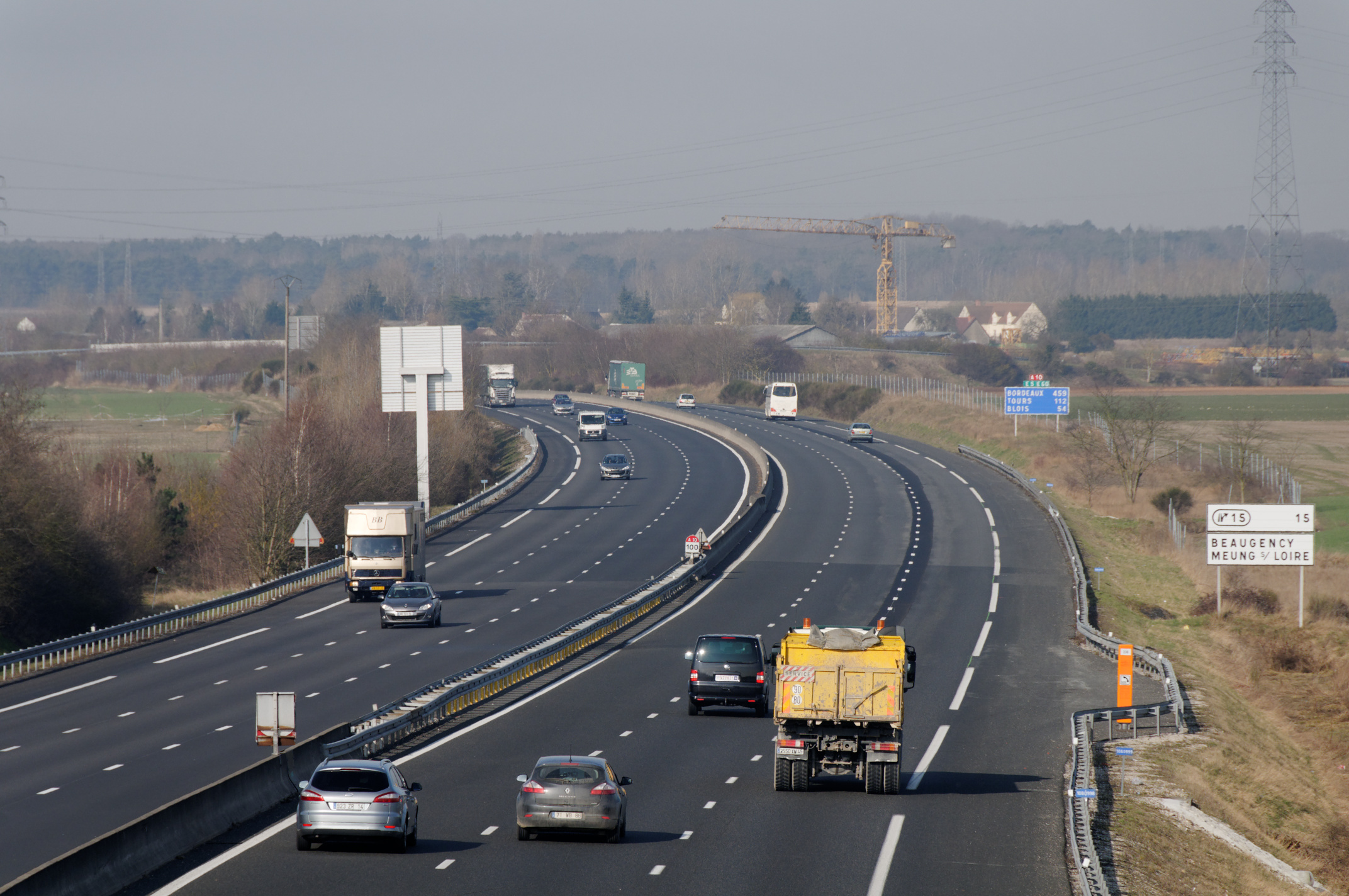
The A10 near Orléans, France, showing hard shoulder and emergency telephone. The broken demarcation line for the hard shoulder is specific to France, and serves as a safety reference mark for drivers: the advisory distance from the vehicle ahead is two dashes minimum.

Freeways, by definition, have no at-grade intersections with other roads, railroads or multi-use trails. Therefore, no traffic signals are needed and through traffic on freeways does not normally need to stop at traffic signals. Some countries, such as the United States, allow for limited exceptions: some movable bridges, for instance the Interstate Bridge on Interstate 5 between Oregon and Washington, do require drivers to stop for ship traffic.

The crossing of freeways by other routes is typically achieved with grade separation either in the form of underpasses or overpasses. In addition to sidewalks (pavements) attached to roads that cross a freeway, specialized pedestrian footbridges or tunnels may also be provided. These structures enable pedestrians and cyclists to cross the freeway at that point without a detour to the nearest road crossing.

Access to freeways is typically provided only at grade-separated interchanges, though lower-standard right-in/right-out (left-in/left-out in countries that drive on the left) access can be used for direct connections to side roads. In many cases, sophisticated interchanges allow for smooth, uninterrupted transitions between intersecting freeways and busy arterial roads. However, sometimes it is necessary to exit onto a surface road to transfer from one freeway to another. One example in the United States (notorious for the resulting congestion) is the connection from Interstate 70 to the Pennsylvania Turnpike (Interstate 70 and Interstate 76) through the town of Breezewood, Pennsylvania.

Speed limits are generally higher on freeways and are occasionally nonexistent (as on much of Germany's Autobahn network). Because higher speeds reduce decision time, freeways are usually equipped with a larger number of guide signs than other roads, and the signs themselves are physically larger. Guide signs are often mounted on overpasses or overhead gantries so that drivers can see where each lane goes. Exit numbers are commonly derived from the exit's distance in miles or kilometres from the start of the freeway. In some areas, there are public rest areas or service areas on freeways, as well as emergency phones on the shoulder at regular intervals.

In the United States, mileposts usually start at the southern or westernmost point on the freeway (either its terminus or the state line). California, Ohio and Nevada use postmile systems in which the markers indicate mileage through the state's individual counties. However, Nevada and Ohio also use the standard milepost system concurrently with their respective postmile systems. California numbers its exits off its freeways according to a milepost system but does not use milepost markers.

Diagram showing lanes and road layout (Irish road markings)

In Europe and some other countries, motorways typically have similar characteristics such as:

- A typical design speed in the range of 100–130 km/h (62–81 mph)
- Minimum values for horizontal curve radii around 750 to 900 m (2,460 to 2,950 ft).
- Maximum longitudinal gradients typically not exceeding 4% to 5%.
- Cross sections incorporating a minimum of two through-traffic lanes for each direction of travel, with a typical width of 3.50 to 3.75 m (11 ft 6 in to 12 ft 4 in) each, separated by a central median.
- An obstacle-free zone varying from 4.5 to 10 m (15 to 33 ft), or alternatively installation of appropriate vehicle restraint systems.
- Proper design of grade-separated interchanges to provide for the movement of traffic between two or more roadways on different levels.
- More frequent (compared to other road types) construction of tunnels and overpasses, requiring complex equipment and methods of operation.
- Installation of highly efficient road equipment and traffic control devices.

=== Cross sections ===
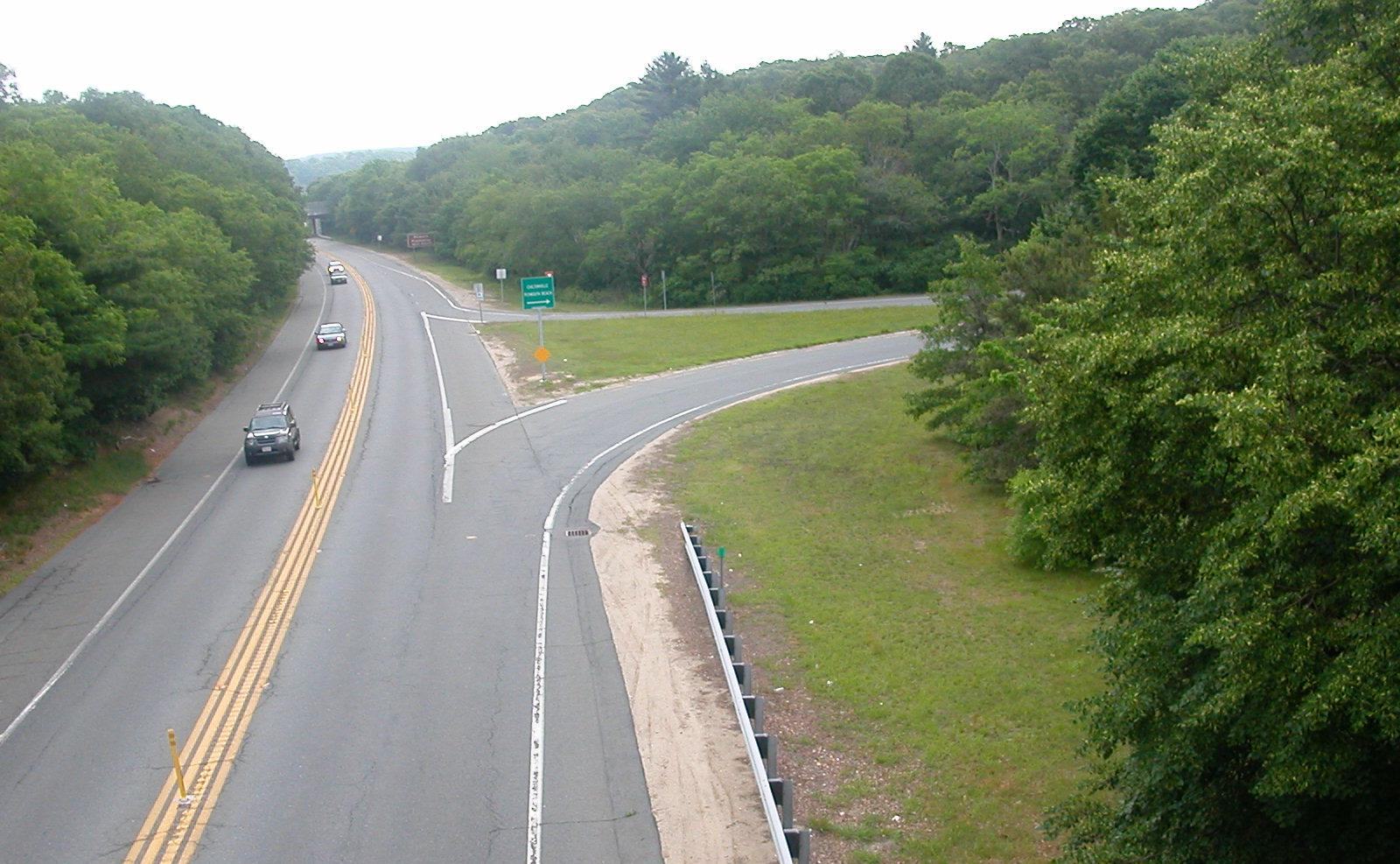
The Plimoth Patuxet Highway in Massachusetts is a two-lane divided freeway.

A controlled access highway may be two lanes known as a two-lane expressway. They are often undivided, are sometimes built when traffic volumes are low (but may be upgraded later), right-of-way is limited or due to low funding. They may be designed for easy conversion to one side of a four-lane freeway and right of way may already be acquired. (For example, most of the Mountain Parkway in eastern Kentucky is two lanes, but work has begun to make all of it four-lane.) These are often called Super two roads. Several such roads are infamous for a high rate of lethal crashes; an outcome because they were designed for short sight distances (sufficient for freeways without oncoming traffic, but insufficient for the years in service as two-lane road with oncoming traffic). An example of such a "Highway to Hell" was European route E4 from Gävle to Axmartavlan, Sweden. The high rate of crashes with severe personal injuries on that (and similar) roads did not cease until a median crash barrier was installed, transforming the fatal crashes into non-fatal crashes. Otherwise, freeways typically have at least two lanes in each direction; some busy ones can have as many as 16 or more lanes (Note: Portions of the Downtown Connector in Atlanta, Georgia, have eight lanes in each direction.) in total.

In San Diego, California, Interstate 5 has a similar system of express and local lanes for a maximum width of 21 lanes on a 2-mile (3.2 km) segment between Interstate 805 and California State Route 56. In Mississauga, Ontario, Highway 401 uses collector-express lanes for a total of 18 lanes through its intersection with Highway 403/Highway 410 and Highway 427.

These wide freeways may use separate collector and express lanes to separate through traffic from local traffic, or special high-occupancy vehicle lanes, either as a special restriction on the innermost lane or a separate roadway, to encourage carpooling. These HOV lanes, or roadways open to all traffic, can be reversible lanes, providing more capacity in the direction of heavy traffic, and reversing direction before traffic switches. Sometimes a collector/distributor road, a shorter version of a local lane, shifts weaving between closely spaced interchanges to a separate roadway or altogether eliminates it.

In some parts of the world, notably parts of the US, frontage roads form an integral part of the freeway system. These parallel surface roads provide a transition between high-speed "through" traffic and local traffic. Frequent slip-ramps provide access between the freeway and the frontage road, which in turn provides direct access to local roads and businesses.

Except on some two-lane freeways (and very rarely on wider freeways), a median separates the opposite directions of traffic. This strip may be as simple as a grassy area, or may include a crash barrier such as a "Jersey barrier" or an "Ontario Tall Wall" to prevent head-on collisions. On some freeways, the two carriageways are built on different alignments; this may be done to make use of available corridors in a mountainous area or to provide narrower corridors through dense urban areas.

=== Control of access ===
Control of access relates to a legal status which limits the types of vehicles that can use a highway, as well as a road design that limits the points at which they can access it.

Major arterial roads will often have partial access control, meaning that side roads will intersect the main road at grade, instead of using interchanges, but driveways may not connect directly to the main road, and drivers must use intersecting roads to access adjacent land. At arterial junctions with relatively quiet side roads, traffic is controlled mainly by two-way stop signs which do not impose significant interruptions on traffic using the main highway. Roundabouts are often used at busier intersections in Europe because they help minimize interruptions in flow, while traffic signals that create greater interference with traffic are still preferred in North America. There may be occasional interchanges with other major arterial roads. Examples include US 23 between SR 15's eastern terminus and Delaware, Ohio, along with SR 15 between its eastern terminus and I-75, US 30, SR 29/US 33, and US 35 in western and central Ohio. This type of road is sometimes called an expressway.

=== Non-motorized access on freeways ===
Freeways are usually limited to motor vehicles of a minimum power or weight; signs may prohibit cyclists, pedestrians and equestrians and impose a minimum speed. It is possible for non-motorized traffic to use facilities within the same right-of-way, such as sidewalks constructed along freeway-standard bridges and multi-use paths next to freeways such as the Suncoast Trail along the Suncoast Parkway in Florida.

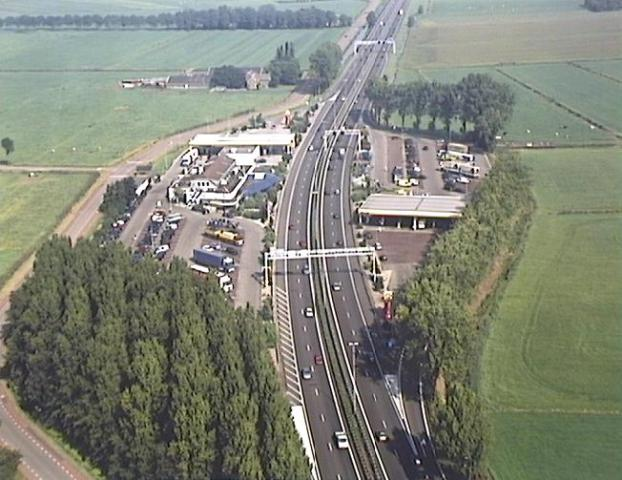
De Lucht Rest Area on the Dutch A2 - a typical rest area in the Netherlands with services (fuel, refreshments and toilets). The only access is via the highway that it serves.

In some US jurisdictions, especially where freeways replace existing roads, non-motorized access on freeways is permitted. Different states of the United States have different laws. Cycling on freeways in Arizona may be prohibited only where there is an alternative route judged equal or better for cycling. Wyoming, the second least densely populated state, allows cycling on all freeways. Oregon allows bicycles except on specific urban freeways in Portland and Medford.

In countries such as the United Kingdom new motorways require an Act of Parliament to ensure restricted right of way. Since upgrading an existing road (the "King's Highway") to a full motorway will result in extinguishing the right of access of certain groups such as pedestrians, cyclists and slow-moving traffic, many controlled access roads are not full motorways. In some cases motorways are linked by short stretches of road where alternative rights of way are not practicable such as the Dartford Crossing (the furthest downstream public crossing of the River Thames) or where it was not economic to build a motorway alongside the existing road such as the former Cumberland Gap. The A1 is a good example of piece-wise upgrading to motorway standard—as of January 2013, the 639-kilometre-long (397 mi) route had five stretches of motorway (designated as A1(M)), reducing to four stretches in March 2018 with completion of the A1(M) through North Yorkshire.

=== Construction techniques ===
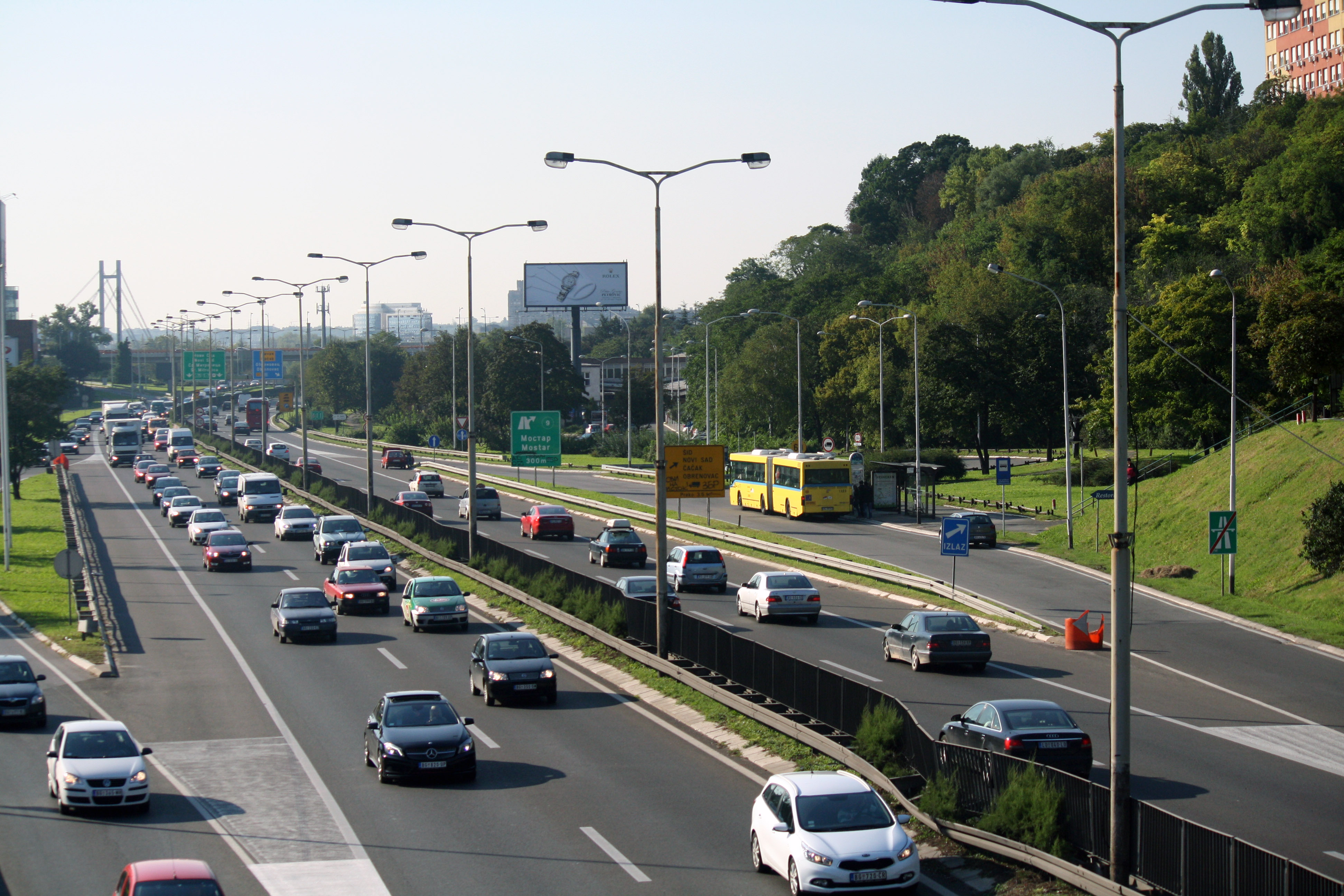
The Belgrade Urban Motorway, constructed between 1970 and 1977, required demolitions of streets and houses, characteristic of urban motorways. In Novi Beograd, the motorway path was already laid out, requiring no demolitions.

The most frequent way freeways are laid out is by building them from the ground up after obstructions such as forestry or buildings are cleared away. Sometimes they deplete farmland, but other methods have been developed for economic, social and even environmental reasons.

Full freeways are sometimes made by converting at-grade expressways or by replacing at-grade intersections with overpasses; however, in the US, any at-grade intersection that ends a freeway often remains an at-grade intersection. Often, when there is a two-lane undivided freeway or expressway, it is converted by constructing a parallel twin corridor, and leaving a median between the two travel directions. The median-side travel lane of the old two-way corridor becomes a passing lane.

Other techniques involve building a new carriageway on the side of a divided highway that has a lot of private access on one side and sometimes has long driveways on the other side since an easement for widening comes into place, especially in rural areas.

When a third carriageway is added, sometimes it can shift a directional carriageway by 20–60 metres (50–200 ft) (or maybe more depending on land availability) as a way to retain private access on one side that favours over the other. Other methods involve constructing a service drive that shortens the long driveways (typically by less than 100 metres (330 ft)).

== Interchanges and access points ==
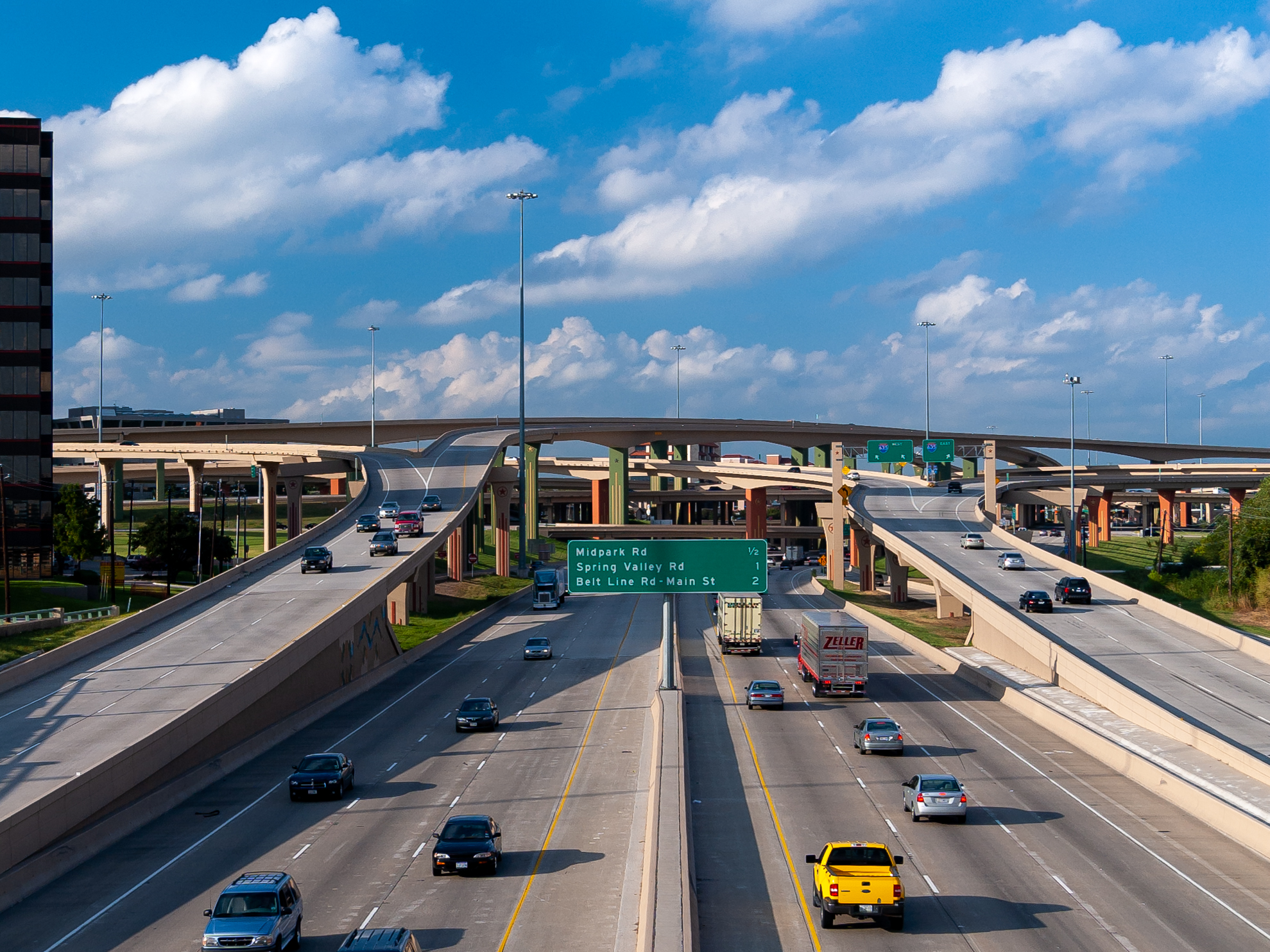
The High Five Interchange in Dallas, Texas, a stack interchange with elevated entrance and exit ramps connecting Interstate 635 and U.S. Route 75

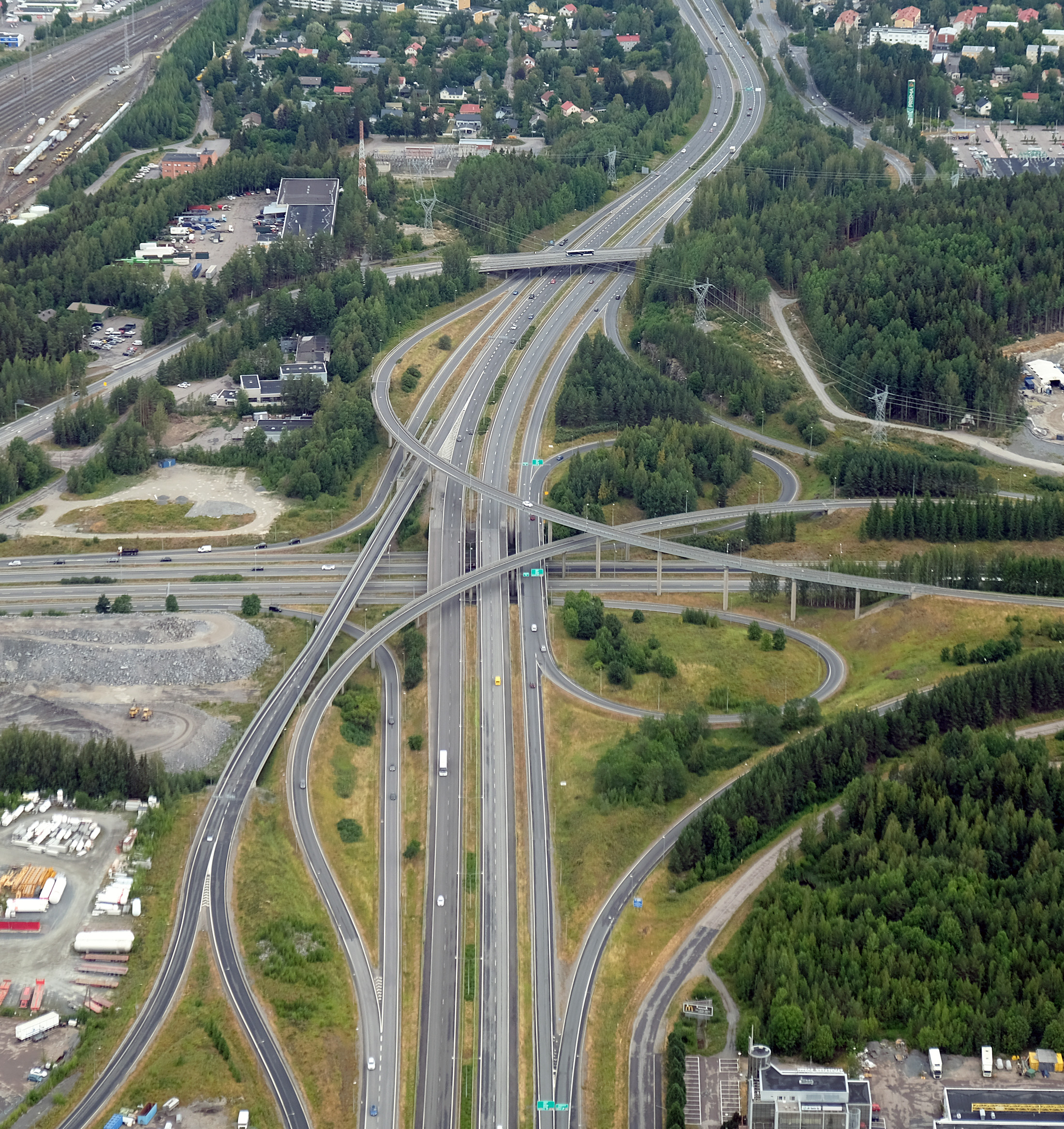
An aerial view of the Lakalaiva interchange in the Tampere Ring Road between the Highway 3 (E12) and Highway 9 (E63) near city of Tampere

An interchange or a junction is a highway layout that permits traffic from one controlled-access highway to access another and vice versa, whereas an access point is a highway layout where traffic from a distributor or local road can join a controlled-access highway. Some countries, such as the United Kingdom, do not distinguish between the two, but others make a distinction; for example, Germany uses the words Kreuz ("cross") or Dreieck ("triangle") for the former and Ausfahrt ("exit") for the latter. In all cases one road crosses the other via a bridge or a tunnel, as opposed to an at-grade crossing.

The inter-connecting roads, or slip-roads, which link the two roads, can follow any one of a number of patterns. The actual pattern is determined by a number of factors including local topology, traffic density, land cost, building costs, type of road, etc. In some jurisdictions feeder/distributor lanes are common, especially for cloverleaf interchanges; in others, such as the United Kingdom, where the roundabout interchange is common, feeder/distributor lanes are seldom seen.

Motorways in Europe typically differentiate between exits and junctions. An exit leads out of the motorway system, whereas a junction is a crossing between motorways or a split/merge of two motorways. The motorway rules end at exits, but not at junctions. However, on some bridges, motorways, without changing appearance, temporarily end between the two exits closest to the bridge (or tunnel), and continue as dual carriageways. This is in order to give slower vehicles a possibility to use the bridge. The Queen Elizabeth II Bridge / Dartford tunnel at London Orbital is an example of this. London Orbital or the M25 is a motorway surrounding London, but at the last River Thames crossing before its mouth, motorway rules do not apply. (At this crossing the London Orbital is labelled A282 instead.)

A few of the more common types of junction are shown below:

Various interchange layouts
Four-level stack: used as a major junction, usually for freeway junctions

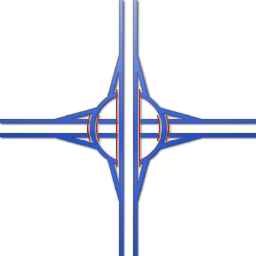
Roundabout interchange: very common in the United Kingdom as either a junction or exit

Cloverleaf: used mainly as a junction

Parclo (partial cloverleaf) interchange: often used to link a minor road with a junction

Trumpet interchange: a motorway "T" junction, used where the interchange represents the terminus of one of the two roads; also common on toll roads as it requires only one tollbooth

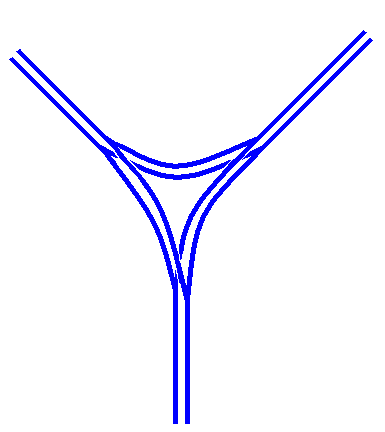
Motorway split or merge; basic logic resembles the T-junction

Single-point urban interchange, or SPUI; used in dense urban areas to reduce the land footprint of the junction

Diverging diamond interchange; designed to improve traffic flow and safety by minimizing turns that must cross oncoming lanes of traffic

== Safety ==
There are many differences between countries in their geography, economy, traffic growth, highway system size, degree of urbanization and motorization, etc.; all of which need to be taken into consideration when comparisons are made. According to some EU papers, safety progress on motorways is the result of several changes, including infrastructure safety and road user behaviour (speed or seat belt use), while other matters such as vehicle safety and mobility patterns have an impact that has not been quantified.

=== Motorways other roads ===
Motorways are the safest roads by design. While accounting for more than one quarter of all kilometres driven, they contributed only 8% of the total number of European road deaths in 2006. Germany's Federal Highway Research Institute provided International Road Traffic and Accident Database (IRTAD) statistics for the year 2010, comparing overall fatality rates with motorway rates (regardless of traffic intensity):

Killed per 1 billion vehicle km
Country	All roads	Motorways	
Country	2010	2010	2020
Austria	7.32	2.15	1.28
Belgium	8.51	2.87	
Czech Republic	16.22	3.38	2.53
Denmark	5.65	1.92	0.91
Finland	5.05	0.61	1.24
France	7.12	1.79	1.56
Germany	5.18	1.98	1.48
Slovenia	7.74	3.77	1.01
Switzerland	5.25	1.04	0.85
United States	6.87	3.62	4.19 (provisional)
Sources: IRTAD-BAST-2020

The German autobahn network illustrates the safety trade-offs of controlled access highways. The injury crash rate is very low on autobahns, while 22 people died per 1,000 injury crashes—although autobahns have a lower rate than the 29 deaths per 1,000 injury accidents on conventional rural roads, the rate is higher than the risk on urban roads. Speeds are higher on rural roads and autobahns than urban roads, increasing the severity potential of a crash.

According to ETSC, German motorways without a speed limit, but with a 130 km/h (81 mph) speed recommendation, are 25% more deadly than motorways with a speed limit.

Germany also introduced some 130 km/h (81 mph) speed limits on various motorway sections that were not limited. This generated a reduction in deaths in a range from 20% to 50% on those sections.

=== Causes of accidents ===
Speed, in Europe, is considered to be one of the main contributory factors to collisions. Some countries, such as France and Switzerland, have achieved a death reduction by a better monitoring of speed. Tools used for monitoring speed might be an increase in traffic density; improved speed enforcement and stricter regulation leading to driver licence withdrawal; safety cameras; penalty point; and higher fines. Some other countries use automatic time-over-distance cameras (also known as section controls) to manage speed.

Fatigue is considered as a risk factor more specific to monotonous roads such as motorways, although such data are not monitored/recorded in many countries. According to Vinci Autoroutes, one third of accidents in French motorways are due to sleepy driving.

23% of people killed on French motorways were not wearing seat belts, while 98% of front-seat passengers and 87% of rear-seat passenger wear seat belts.

=== Fatalities trends ===
Although safety results do not change much from year to year, in Europe some changes have been observed: motorway fatalities decreased by 41% during the 2006–2015 decade, but increased by 10% between 2014 and 2015. However, taking into account motorway network length to reflect exposure, data shows that fatalities per thousand kilometres halved between 2006 and 2015.

EU motorway fatalities
Year	Fatalities	Rate per million population	Rate per 1,000 km of motorways
2006	3,485	7.1	54.4
2010	2,329	4.7	32.9
2015	2,048	4.1	27.3
Source: Traffic Safety Basic Facts 2017, Motorways

=== Toll effect ===
A University of Barcelona study suggests that if tolls are implemented on a controlled-access highway, drivers may seek alternative routes to avoid paying the tolls. This may result in a decrease of safety on roads that are not designed for heavy traffic.

=== Safety in urban areas ===
In the United Kingdom, there are very few studies regarding the impact of road traffic accidents from existing and new urban motorways. In particular, new urban motorways do not grant a reduction of traffic accidents.

In Italy, a study performed on urban motorway A56 Tangenziale di Napoli showed that reduction of speed leads to a decrease in accidents.

In Marseille, France, from June 2009 to May 2010, CEREMA, the French centre for studies on risk, mobility and environment, performed a study on Marius, a network of urban motorways. This study established a link between accidents and traffic variables:

- for single vehicle accidents, the 6-minute average speed on the fast lane; and the time headway (on every lane),
- for multiple vehicle accidents, the occupancy, and the time headway (for the middle lane).

The 150-kilometre-long (93 mi) Marius network counts 292 injury accidents or fatalities for 1.5 billion of vehicle-kilometres, that is 189 injury accidents or fatalities for 1 billion of vehicle-kilometres.

Some European countries have improved safety of urban motorways, with a set of measures to dynamically manage traffic flow in response to changing volumes, speeds, and incidents, including:

- Variable speed limits, line control, and speed harmonization
- Shoulder running with emergency refuge areas
- Queue warning and variable messaging
- 24/7 monitoring of traffic with cameras and/or in-pavement sensors (both to detect incidents and identify when to reduce speed limits)
- Incident management
- Automated enforcement
- Specialized algorithms for temporary shoulder running, variable speed limits, and/or incident detection and management
- Ramp metering (coordinated or independent function)

In 1994, it was assumed that lighting urban motorways would benefit from more safety than unlighted ones.

In California, in 2001, a study established, for urban freeways, some relationships among urban freeway accidents, traffic flow, weather, and lighting conditions:

- it establishes a difference between dry freeways in daylight and wet freeways in darkness
- it establishes that left-lane collisions are more likely induced by volume effects, while right-lane collisions are more closely tied to speed variances in adjacent lanes (in California, people drive in the right lane except when passing).

== Environmental effects ==
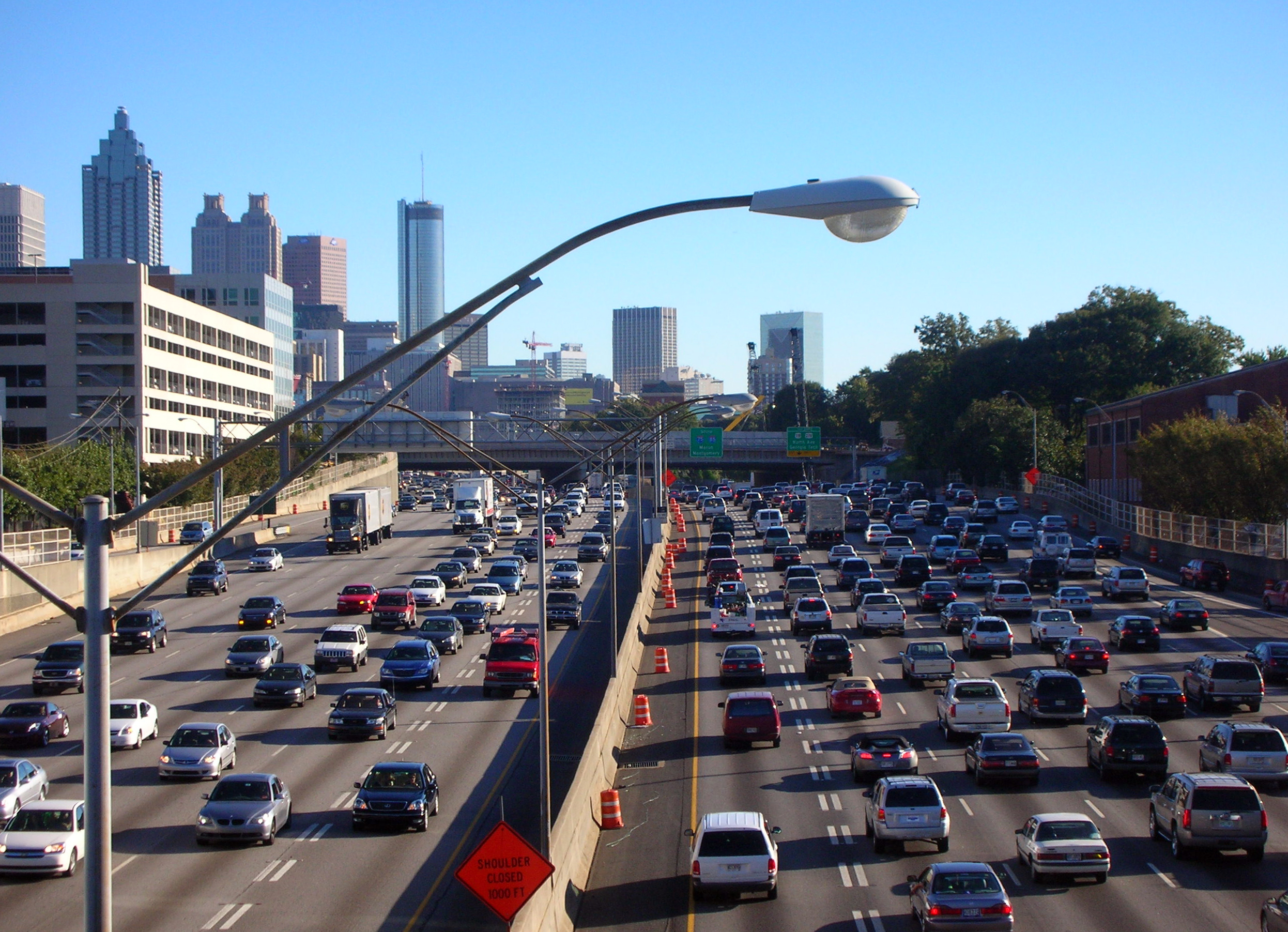
Traffic congestion, such as this on the Downtown Connector in Atlanta, is a cause of photochemical smog.

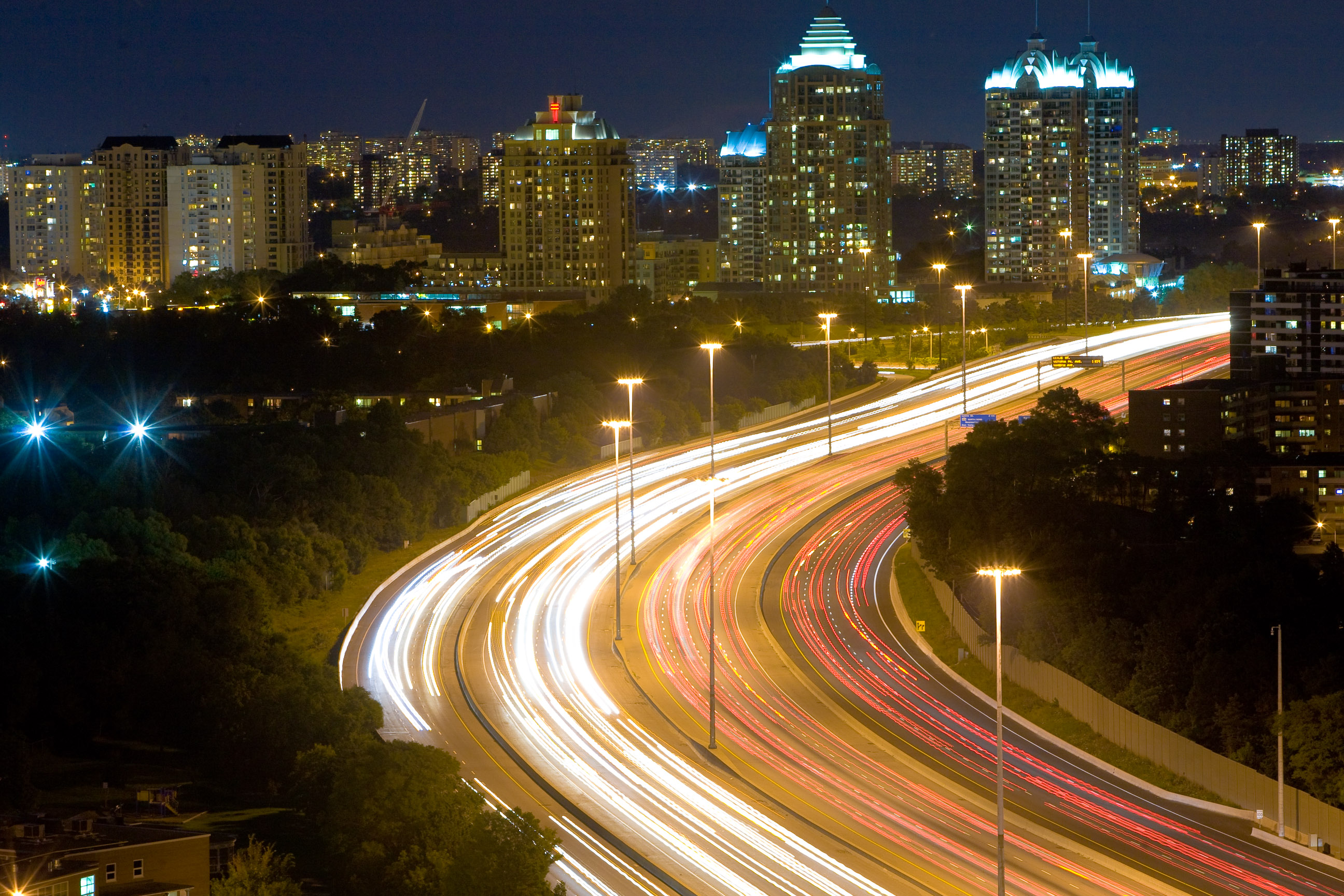
Highway lighting can have a negative influence on those living close to the freeway. High-mast lighting is an alternative as it concentrates the light on the road, but the tall structures can also lead to a NIMBY effect. Seen here is Ontario Highway 401 through suburban Toronto.

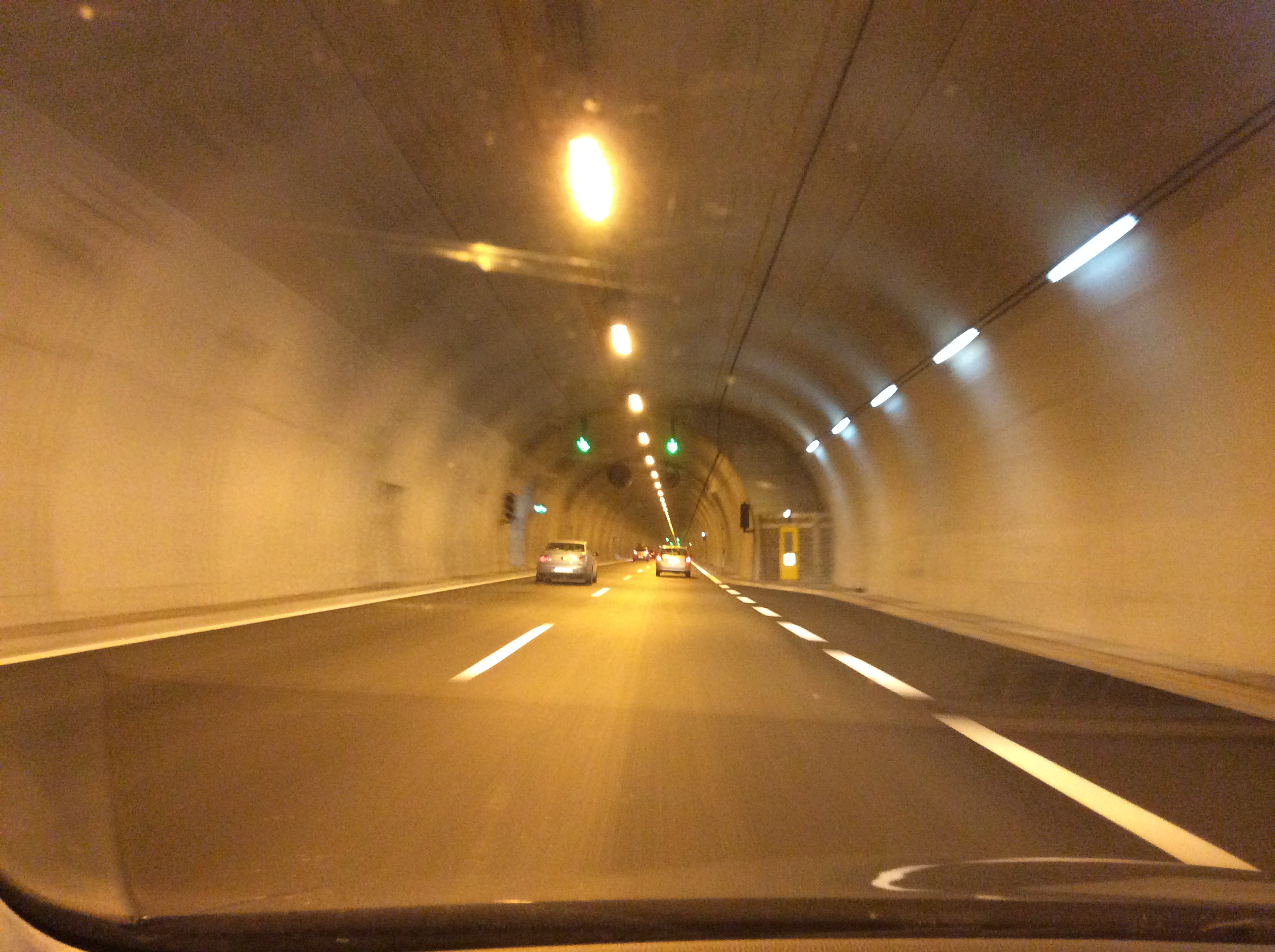
Tunnel on the A1 motorway in Greece

Controlled-access highways have been constructed both between major cities as well as within them, leading to the sprawling suburban development found near most modern cities. Highways have been heavily criticized for the noise, pollution, and economic shifts they bring. Additionally, they have been criticized by drivers for the inefficiency with which they handle peak hour traffic.

Often, rural highways open up vast areas to economic development and municipal services, generally raising property values. In contrast to this, above-grade highways in urban areas are often a source of lowered property values, contributing to urban decay. Even with overpasses and underpasses, neighbourhoods are divided—especially impoverished ones where residents are less likely to own a car, or to have the political and economic influence to resist construction efforts. Beginning in the early 1970s, the US Congress identified freeways and other urban highways as responsible for most of the noise exposure of the US population. Subsequently, computer models were developed to analyse freeway noise and aid in their design to help minimize noise exposure.

Some cities have implemented freeway removal policies, under which freeways have been demolished and reclaimed as boulevards or parks, notably in Seoul (Cheonggyecheon), Portland (Harbor Drive), New York City (West Side Elevated Highway), Boston (Central Artery), San Francisco (Embarcadero Freeway), Seattle (Alaskan Way Viaduct), and Milwaukee (Park East Freeway).

An alternative to surface or above-ground freeway construction has been the construction of underground urban freeways using tunnelling technologies. This has been employed in Madrid and Prague, as well as the Australian cities of Sydney (which has five such freeways), Brisbane (which has three), and Melbourne (which has two). This has had the benefit of not creating heavily trafficked surface roads and, in the case of Melbourne's EastLink freeway, prevented the destruction of an ecologically sensitive area.

Other Australian cities face similar problems (lack of available land, cost of home acquisition, aesthetic problems and community opposition). Brisbane, which also has to contend with physical boundaries (the Brisbane River) and rapid population increases, has embraced underground freeways. There are currently three open to traffic (Clem Jones Tunnel (CLEM7), Airport Link and Legacy Way) and one (East-West Link) is currently in planning. All of the tunnels are designed to act as an inner-city ring road or bypass system and include provision for public transport, whether underground or in reclaimed space on the surface. However, freeways are not beneficial for road-based public transport services, because the restricted access to the roadway means that it is awkward for passengers to get to the limited number of boarding points unless they drive to them, largely defeating the purpose.

In Canada, the extension of Highway 401 toward Detroit, known as the Herb Gray Parkway, has been designed with numerous tunnels and underpasses that provide land for parks and recreational uses.

Freeway opponents have found that freeway expansion is often self-defeating: expansion simply generates more traffic. That is, even if traffic congestion is initially shifted from local streets to a new or widened freeway, people will begin to use their cars more and commute from more remote locations. Over time, the freeway and its environs become congested again as both the average number and distance of trips increases. This phenomenon is known as induced demand.

Urban planning experts such as Drusilla Van Hengel, Joseph DiMento and Sherry Ryan argue that although properly designed and maintained freeways may be convenient and safe, at least in comparison to uncontrolled roads, they may not expand recreation, employment and education opportunities equally for different ethnic groups, or for people located in certain neighbourhoods of any given city. Still, they may open new markets to some small businesses.

Construction of urban freeways for the US Interstate Highway System, which began in the late 1950s, led to the demolition of thousands of city blocks and the dislocation of many more thousands of people. The citizens of many inner city areas responded with the freeway and expressway revolts. Through the study of Washington's response, it can be shown that the most effective changes came not from executive or legislative action, but instead from policy implementation. One of the foremost rationales for the creation of the United States Department of Transportation (USDOT) was that an agency was needed to mediate between the conflicting interests of interstates and cities. Initially, these policies came as regulation of the state highway departments. Over time, USDOT officials re-focused highway building from a national level to the local scale. With this shift of perspective came an encouragement for alternative transportation, and locally based planning agencies.

At present, freeway expansion has largely stalled in the United States, due to a multitude of factors that converged in the 1970s: higher due process requirements prior to taking of private property, increasing land values, increasing costs for construction materials, local opposition to new freeways in urban cores, the passage of the National Environmental Policy Act (which imposed the requirement that each new federally funded project must have an environmental impact statement or report) and falling gas tax revenues as a result of the nature of the flat-cent tax (it is not automatically adjusted for inflation), the tax revolt movement, and growing popular support for high-speed mass transit in lieu of new freeways.

== Route numbering ==
=== United Kingdom ===
==== Great Britain ====
Motorway number zones of England and Wales

===== England and Wales =====
In England and Wales, the numbers of major motorways followed a numbering system separate from that of the A-road network, though based on the same principle of zones. Running clockwise from the M1, the zones were defined for Zones 1 to 4 based on the proposed M2, M3 and M4 motorways. The M5 and M6 numbers were reserved for the other two planned long-distance motorways. The Preston Bypass, the UK's first motorway, should have been numbered A6(M) under the scheme decided upon, but it was decided to keep the number M6 as it had already been applied.

A map Showing Future Pattern of Principal National Routes was issued by the Ministry of War Transport in 1946 shortly before the law that allowed roads to be restricted to specified classes of vehicle (the Special Roads Act 1949) was passed. The first section of motorway, the M6 Preston Bypass, opened in 1958, followed by the first major section of motorway (the M1 between Crick and Berrygrove in Watford), which opened in 1959. From then until the 1980s, motorways opened at frequent intervals; by 1972 the first 1,600 kilometres (1,000 mi) of motorway had been built.

While roads outside of urban areas continued to be built throughout the 1970s, opposition to urban routes became more pronounced. Most notably, plans by the Greater London Council for a series of ringways were cancelled following extensive road protests and a rise in costs. In 1986 the single-ring, M25 motorway was completed as a compromise. In 1996 the total length of motorways reached 3,200 kilometres (2,000 mi).

Motorways in Great Britain, as in numerous European countries, will nearly always have the following characteristics:

1. No traffic lights (except occasionally on slip roads before reaching the main carriageway).
2. Exit is nearly always via a numbered junction and slip road, with rare minor exceptions.
3. Pedestrians, cyclists and vehicles below a specified engine size are banned.
4. There is a central reservation separating traffic flowing in opposing directions. (The only exception to this is the A38(M) in Birmingham where the central reservation is replaced by another lane in which the direction of traffic changes depending on the time of day. There was another small spur motorway near Manchester with no solid central reservation, but this was declassified as a motorway in the 2000s.)
5. No roundabouts on the main carriageway. This is only the case on motorways beginning with M (so called 'M' class). In the case of upgraded A roads with numbers ending with M (i.e. Ax(M)), roundabouts may exist on the main carriageway where they intersect 'M' class motorways. In all 'M' class motorways bar two, there are no roundabouts except at the point at which the motorway ends or the motorway designation ends. The only exceptions to this in Great Britain are:
  - the M271 in Southampton which has a roundabout on the main carriageway where it meets the M27, but then continues as the M271 after the junction.
  - on the M60. This came about as a result of renumbering sections of the M62 and M66 motorways near Manchester as the M60, to form a ring around the city. What was formerly the junction between the M62 and M66 now involves the clockwise M60 negotiating a roundabout, while traffic for the eastbound M62 and northbound M66 carries straight on from the M60. This junction, known as Simister Island, has been criticised for the presence of a roundabout and the numbered route turning off.
  - the A1(M) between the M62 in North Yorkshire and Washington in Tyne and Wear is built to full 'M' class standards without any roundabouts. It has been suggested that this section of the A1(M) should be reclassified as the northern extension of the M1.

It was proposed in 2013 that the Ax(M) format number would be used for the highest standard of a new classification of road referred to in England as "expressways", which would be roads without normal roundabouts or right turns across the central reservation, and with graded junctions. Such roads would have motorway-style restrictions but emergency reservations rather than standard major motorway-standard hard shoulders.

===== Scotland =====
In Scotland, where the Scottish Office (superseded by the Scottish Executive in 1999) rather than the Ministry of Transport and Civil Aviation had the decision, there is no zonal pattern, but rather the A-road rule is strictly enforced. It was decided to reserve the numbers 7, 8 and 9 for Scotland. The M8 follows the route of the A8, and the A90 became part of the M90 when the A90 was re-routed along the path of the A85.

Motorways follow an "M"-format, with two exceptions: the A823(M) near Rosyth joining the A823 to the M90, and the A74(M) between the English M6 at Gretna and the M74 at Abington.

==== Northern Ireland ====
In Northern Ireland a distinct numbering system is used, which is separate from the rest of the United Kingdom, though the classification of roads along the lines of A, B and C is universal throughout the UK and the Isle of Man. According to a written answer to a parliamentary question to the Northern Ireland Minister for Regional Development, there is no known reason as to how Northern Ireland's road numbering system was devised. However motorways, as in the rest of the UK, are numbered M, with the two major motorways coming from Belfast being numbered M1 and M2. The M12 is a short spur of the M1, with the M22 being a short continuation (originally intended to be a spur) of the M2. There are two other motorways, the short M3, the M5 and a motorway section of the A8 road, known as the A8(M).

=== Ireland ===
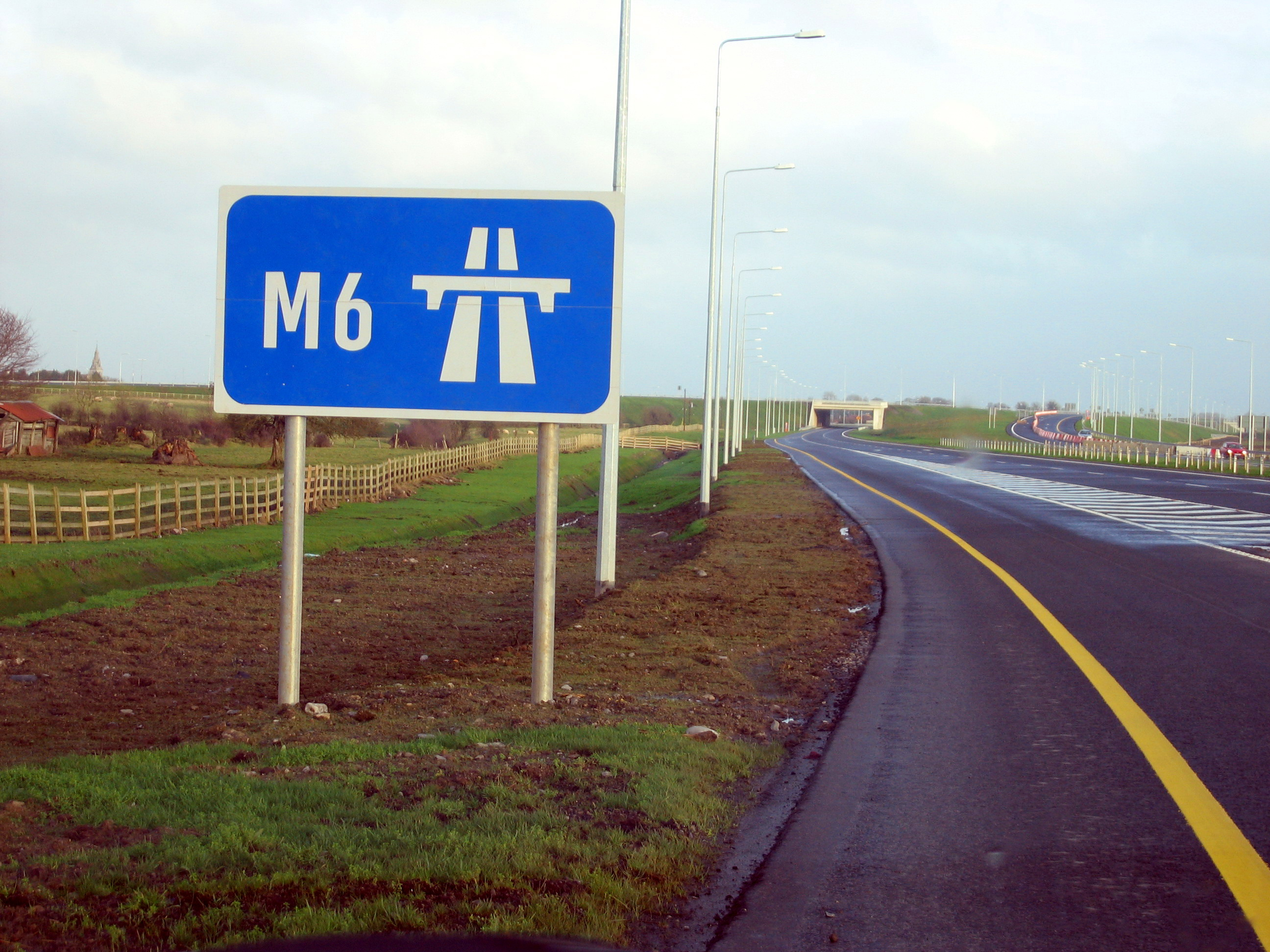
Signage on the M6 near Kinnegad in Ireland. The pictogram of a dual carriageway traversed by an overpass is used in many European countries to indicate the start of motorway regulations. In this case the appropriate motorway number is shown and in accordance with Irish practice a continuous yellow line indicates a motorway rather than a high-quality dual carriageway (HQDC).

In Ireland, since the passage of the Roads Act 1993, all motorways are part of, or form, national primary roads. These routes are numbered in series, (usually, radiating anti-clockwise from Dublin, starting with the N1/M1) using numbers from 1 to 33 (and, separately from the series, 50). Motorways use the number of the route of which they form part, with an M prefix rather than N for national road (or in theory, rather than R for regional road). In most cases, the motorway has been built as a bypass of a road previously forming the national road (e.g. the M7 bypassing roads previously forming the N7)—the bypassed roads are reclassified as regional roads, although updated signposting may not be provided for some time, and adherence to signage colour conventions is lax (regional roads have black-on-white directional signage, national routes use white-on-green).

Under the previous legislation, the Local Government (Roads and Motorways) Act 1974, motorways theoretically existed independently to national roads. However, the short sections of motorway opened during this act, except for the M50, always took their number from the national road that they were bypassing. The older road was not downgraded at this point (indeed, regional roads were not legislated for at this stage). Older signage at certain junctions on the M7 and M11 can be seen reflecting this earlier scheme, where for example N11 and M11 can be seen coexisting.

The M50, an entirely new national road, is an exception to the normal inheritance process, as it does not replace a road previously carrying an N number. The M50 was nevertheless legislated in 1994 as the N50 route (it had only a short section of non-motorway section from the Junction 11 Tallaght to Junction 12 Firhouse until its extension as the Southern Cross Motorway). The M50's designation was chosen as a recognisable number. As of 2010, the N34 is the next unused national primary road designation. In theory, a motorway in Ireland could form part of a regional road.

=== Australia ===
In Australia, highway and motorway (also called freeway or expressway) numbers either use alphanumeric route markers with M prefix for motorways, freeways and expressways or national/state route markers.

Before the implementation of alpha-numeric route markers, controlled-access highways were marked with a Metroad, National Highway, National Route or State Route Marker. In Sydney, Metroad route markers were used for motorways and freeways, except the Pacific Motorway (then F3 Freeway), which was marked with a National Highway marker. In Brisbane, Metroad, State routes were used for motorways and freeways. In Melbourne, all motorways and freeways used State Route markers. In Western Australia, National Route markers are used for expressways and freeways.

After the implementation of alphanumeric route markers, all route markers being used for motorways and freeways in Brisbane, Melbourne and Sydney were replaced with a M marker. In Western Australia, they have not implemented the new system yet.

Alphanumeric route marker. Replaced all previous route markers except Western Australia.

State Route marker, used for Motorways in Western Australia and Queensland (only Smith Street Motorway and Sunshine Motorway).

Metroad (fell out of use), were used in Metropolitan Sydney and Brisbane.

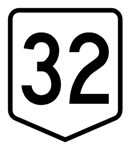
National Route marker (fell out of use), were used in Sydney and Western Australia.

National Highway, used for some freeways in Tasmania.

=== Elsewhere ===
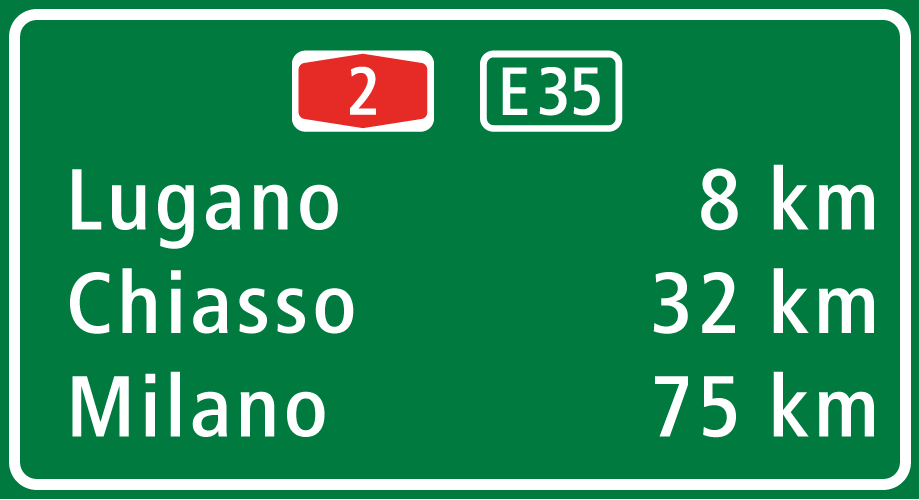
Sign on a Swiss Autostrada (A2/E35 near Lugano, Switzerland)

In Hungary, similar to Ireland, motorway numbers can be derived from the original national highway numbers (1–7), with an M prefix attached, e.g. M7 is on the route of the old Highway 7 from Budapest towards Lake Balaton and Croatia. New motorways not following the original Budapest-centred radial highway system get numbers M8, M9, etc., or M0 in the case of the ring road around Budapest.

In the Netherlands, motorway numbers can be derived from the original national highway numbers, but with an A (Autosnelweg) prefix attached, like A9.

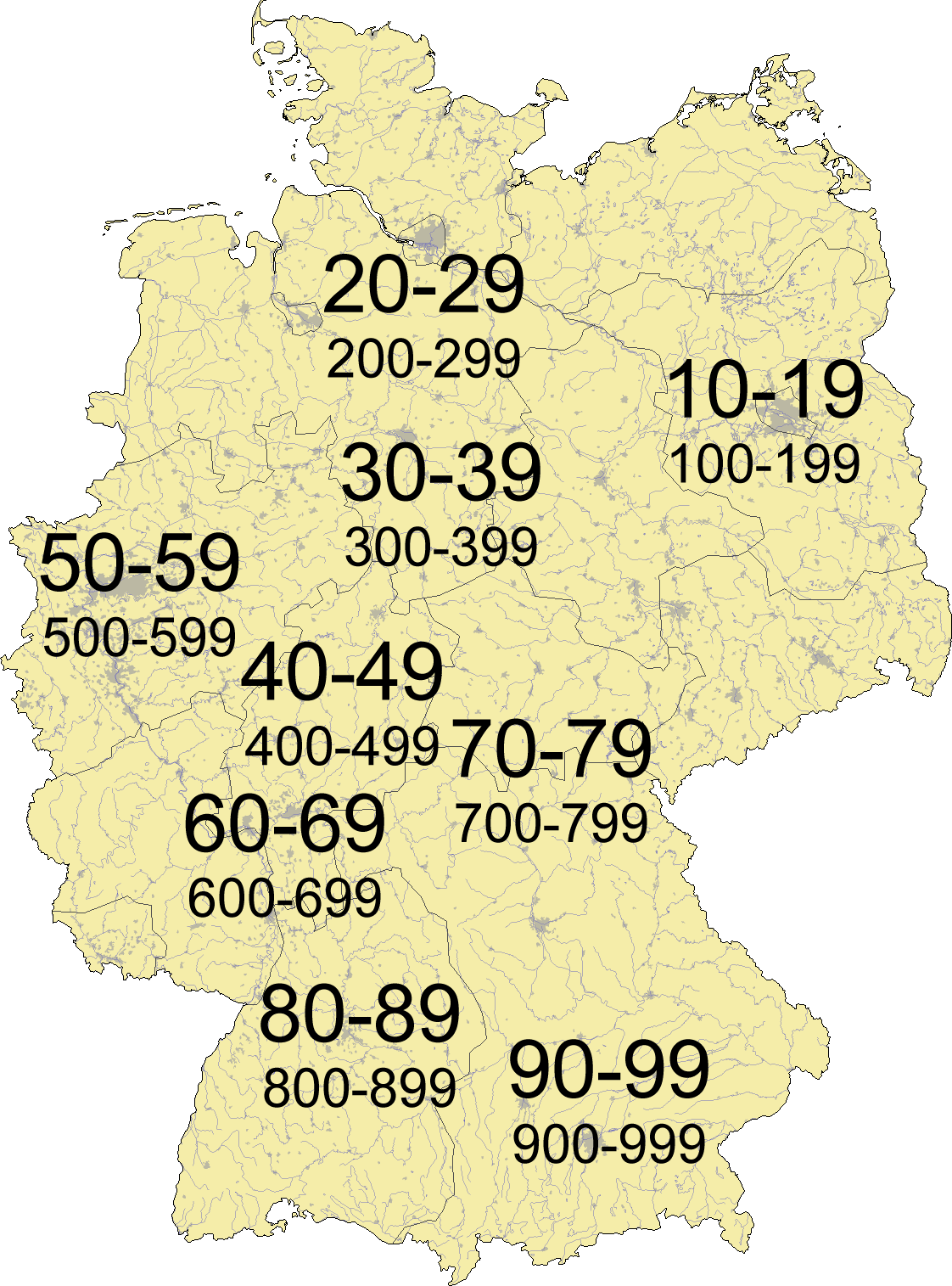
Numbering scheme in Germany

In Germany federal motorways have the prefix A (Autobahn). If the following number is odd, the motorway generally follows a north–south direction, while even-numbered motorways generally follow an east–west direction. Other controlled-access roads (dual carriageways) in Germany can be federal highways (Bundesstraßen), state highways (Landesstraßen), district highways (Kreisstraßen) and city highways (Stadtstraßen), each with their own numbering system.

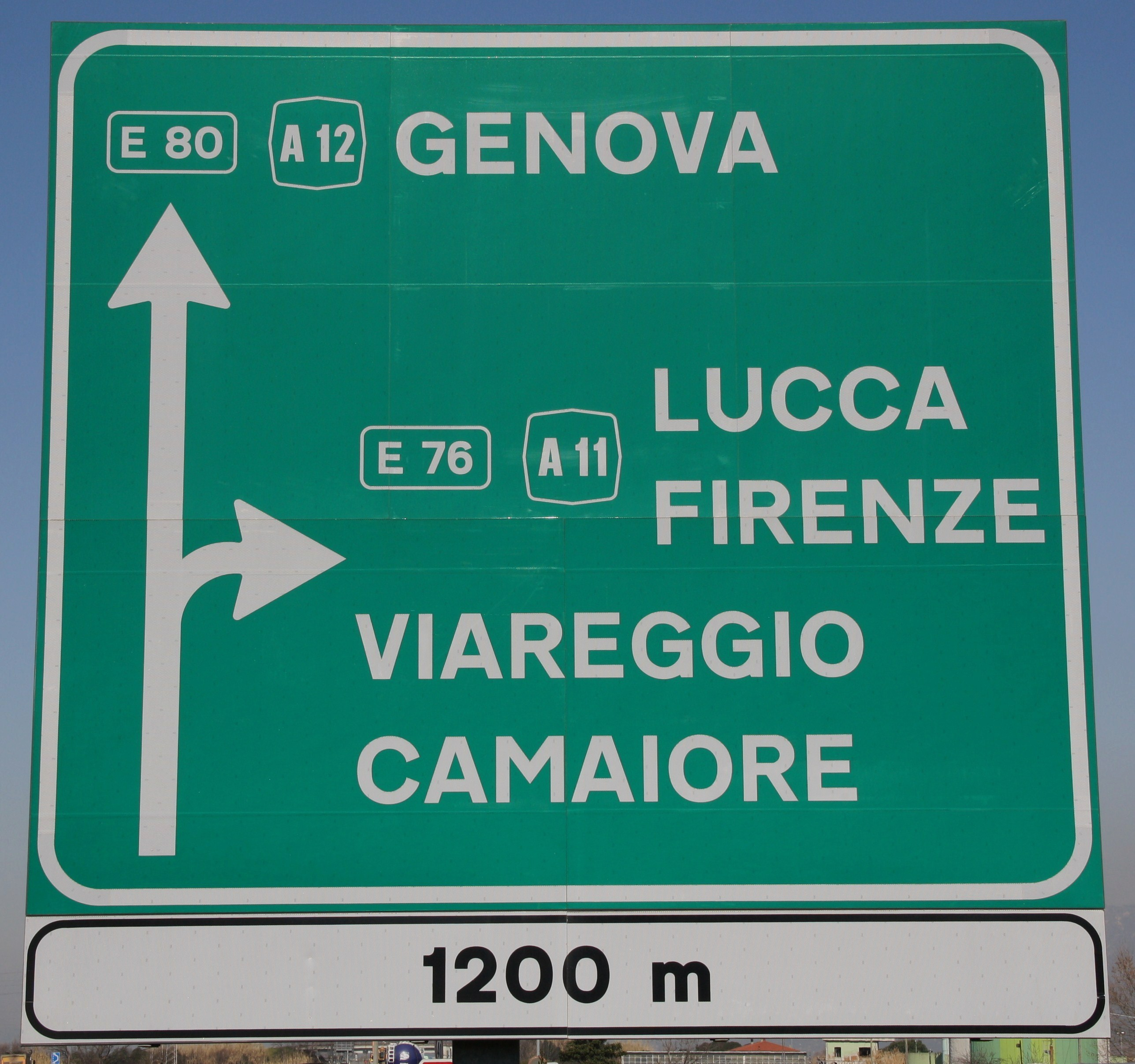
Italian Autostrada A12 (E80) traffic sign

In Italy, motorways follow a single numbering, even if managed by different concessionaire companies: they are all marked with the letter "A" (for autostrada; "RA" in the case of motorway junctions, with the exception of the Bereguardo-Pavia junction numbered on the signs as Autostrada A53, and "T" for the international Alpine tunnels) followed by a number. Therefore, a motorway with the same numbering can be managed by different concessionaire companies (for example the Autostrada A23 is managed for a stretch by Società Autostrade Alto Adriatico and for the remaining stretch by Autostrade per l'Italia).

In New Zealand, as well as in Brazil, Russia, Finland, and the Scandinavian countries, motorway numbers are derived from the state highway route that they form a part of, but unlike Hungary and Ireland, they are not distinguished from non-motorway sections of the same state highway route. In the cases where a new motorway acts as a bypass of a state highway route, the original state highway is either stripped of that status or renumbered. A low road number means a road suitable for long-distance driving.

In Belgium, motorways but also some dual carriageways have numbers preceded by an A. However, those that also have an E-number are generally referenced with that one. City rings and bypasses have numbers preceded by an R; these also can be either motorways or dual carriageways.

In Croatia, motorway numbering is independent of state route numbering. Motorways are prefixed by an A (for autocesta), as in many other European countries. Some motorways are the result of an upgrade of an older two-lane road, and carry concurrencies with state routes. In some other cases, such as with the A2, following the upgrade, the state route was rerouted onto the frontage road.

== By country ==
While the design characteristics listed above are generally applicable around the globe, every jurisdiction provides its own specifications and design criteria for controlled-access highways.

=== Africa ===
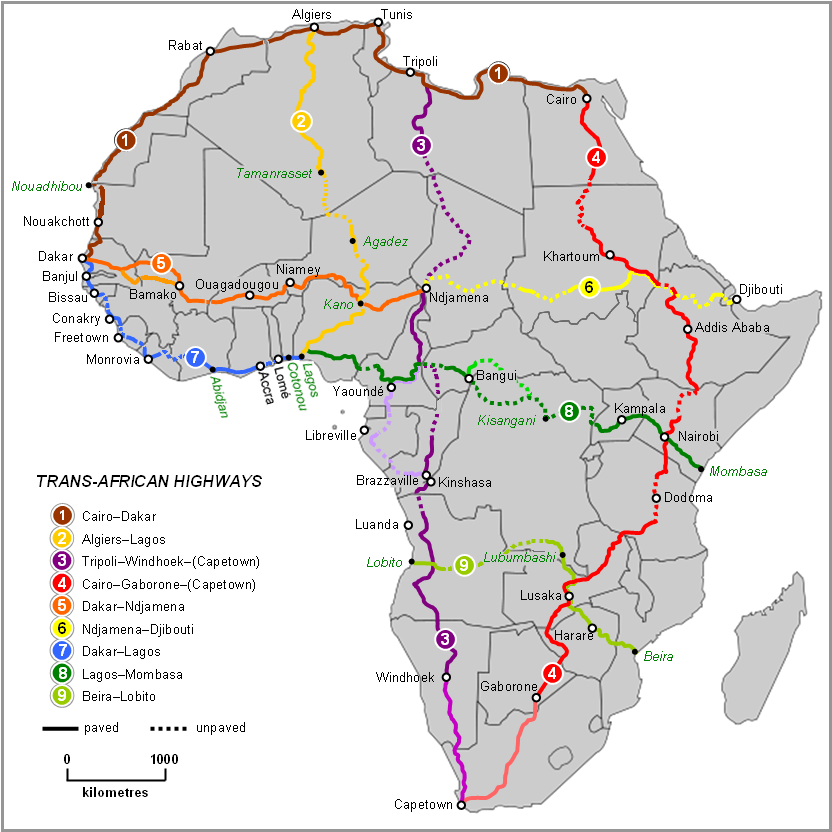
Trans-African Highways

==== Algeria ====

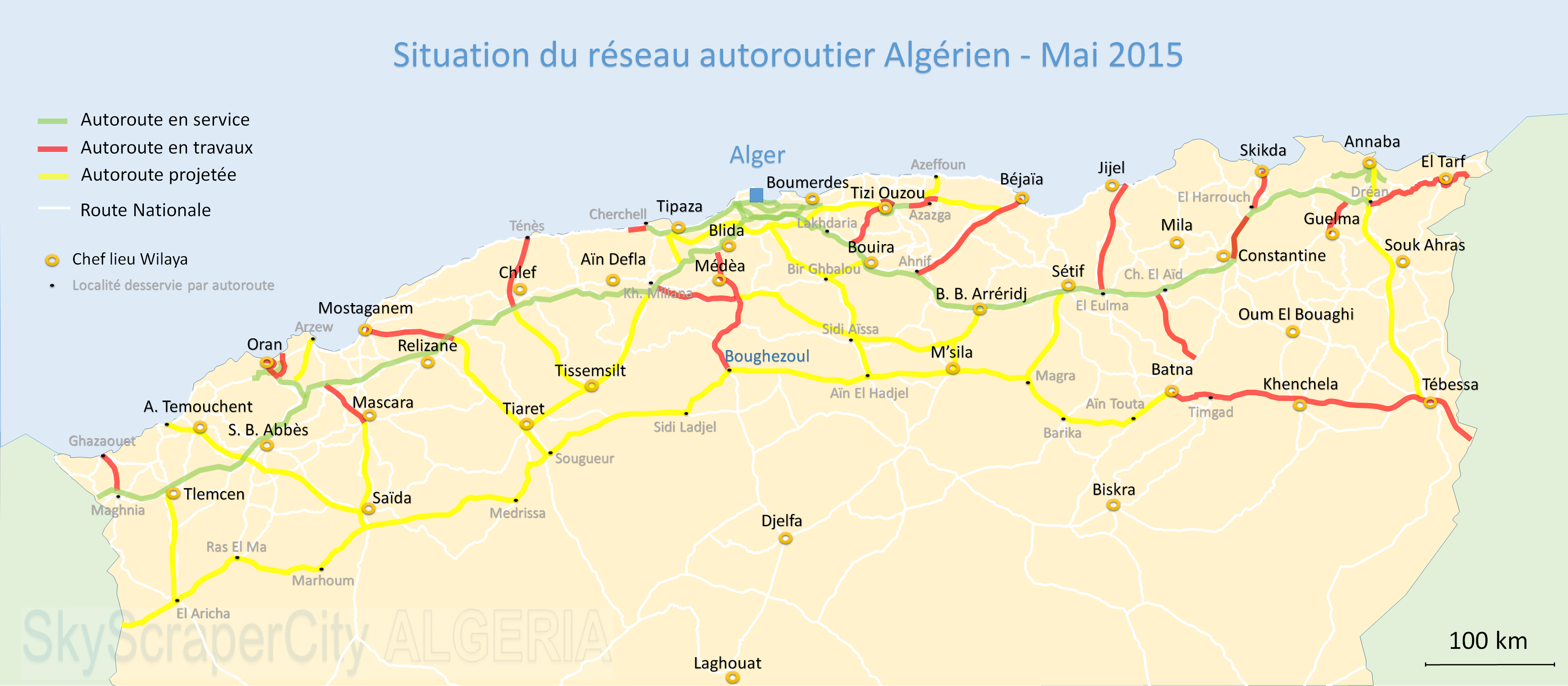
Algerian highways network

In Algeria, the motorway network has about 2,318 km (1,440 mi) in 2x3 lanes. The network is expanding increasingly, along with other kinds of infrastructure, though this is only true for the northern region of the country, where most of its population lives. And this infrastructure is pretty well developed for North African standards.

For the moment, the entire Algerian motorway network is toll-free. The toll stations are being finalized and the launch of the motorway toll is scheduled for early 2021. The maximum speed authorized on the entire network is 120 km/h (75 mph).

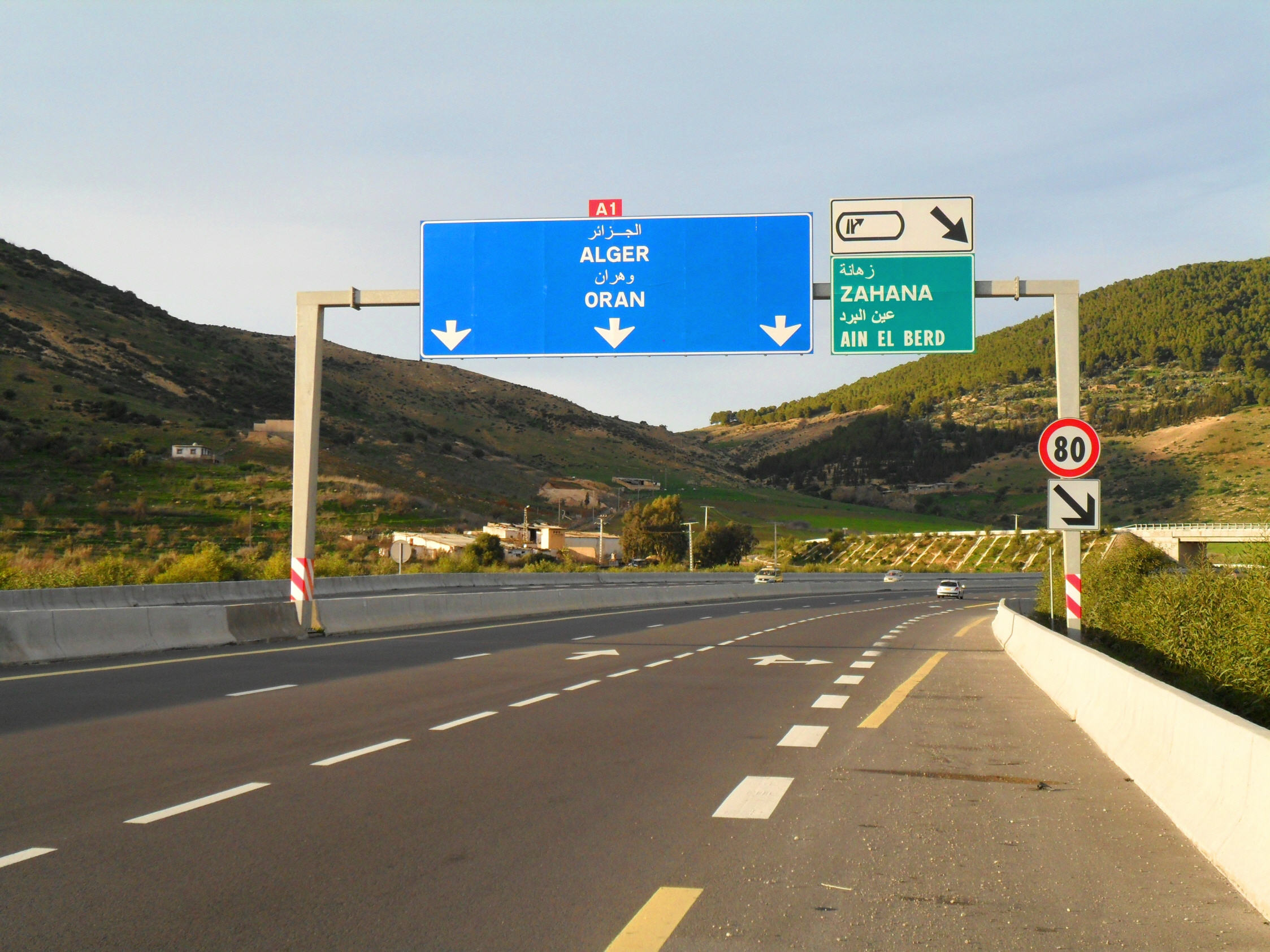
East–West Highway near Oran

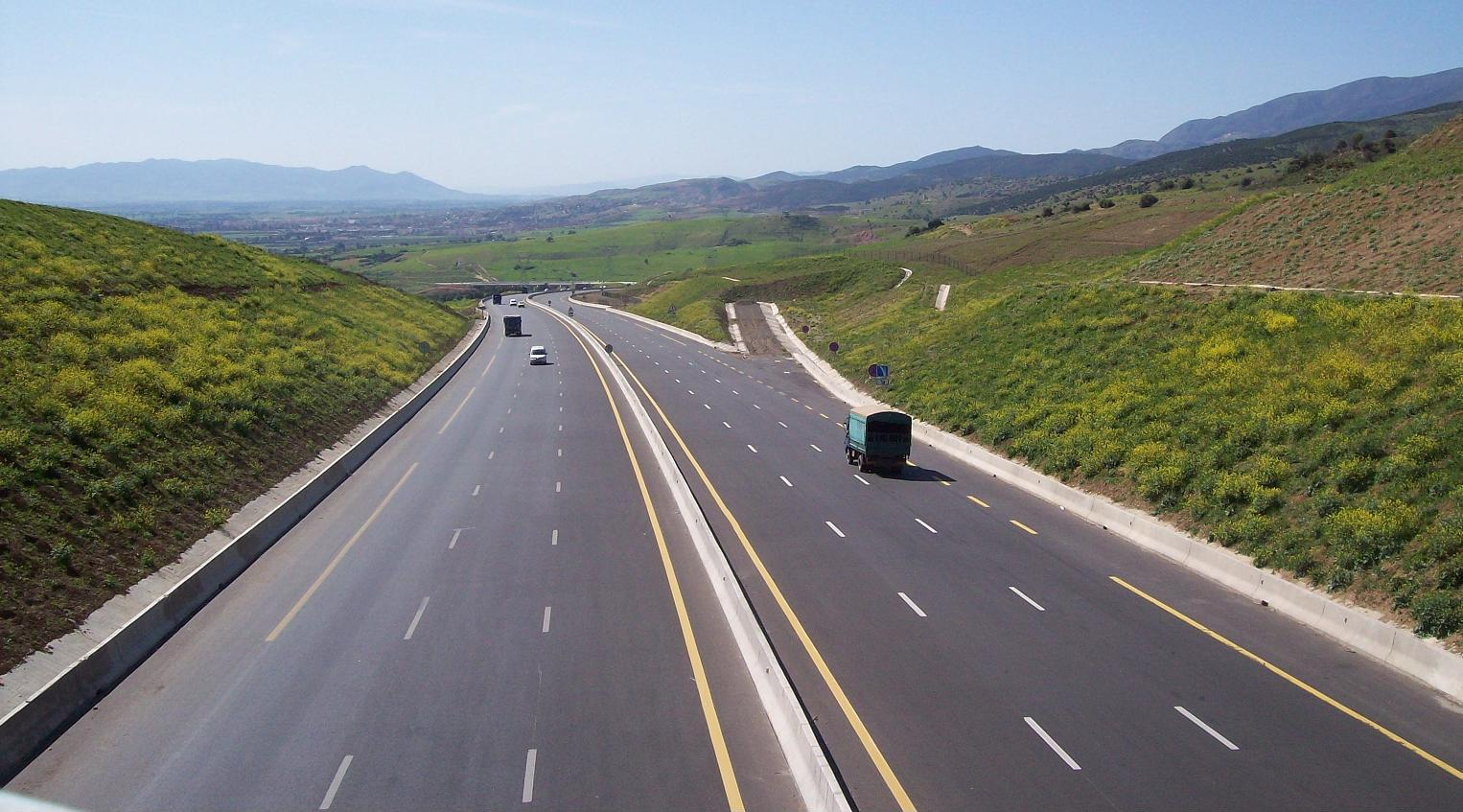
Autoroute Est-Ouest, near Ghomri, Relizane Province

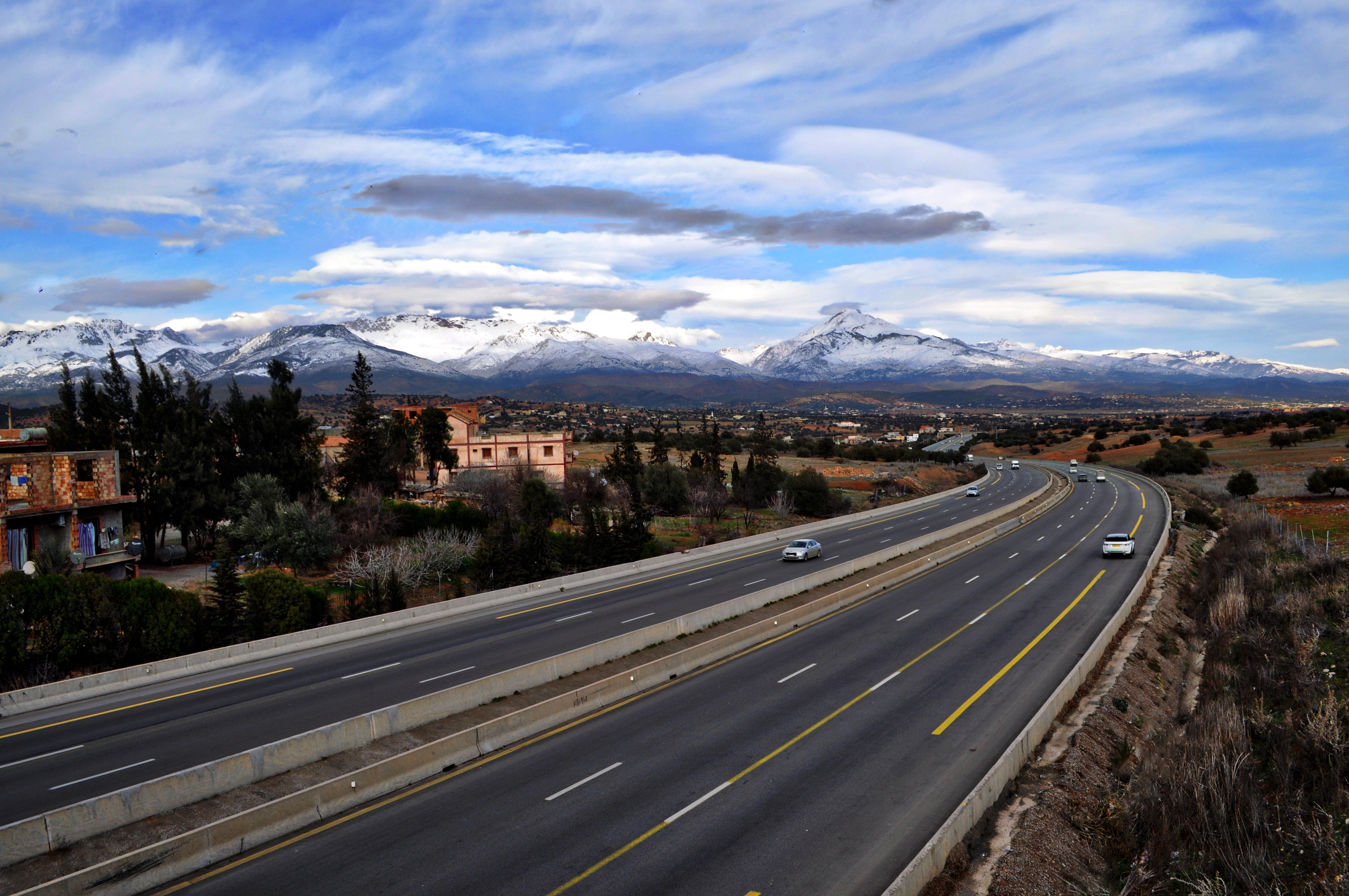
Autoroute A2 near Bouira

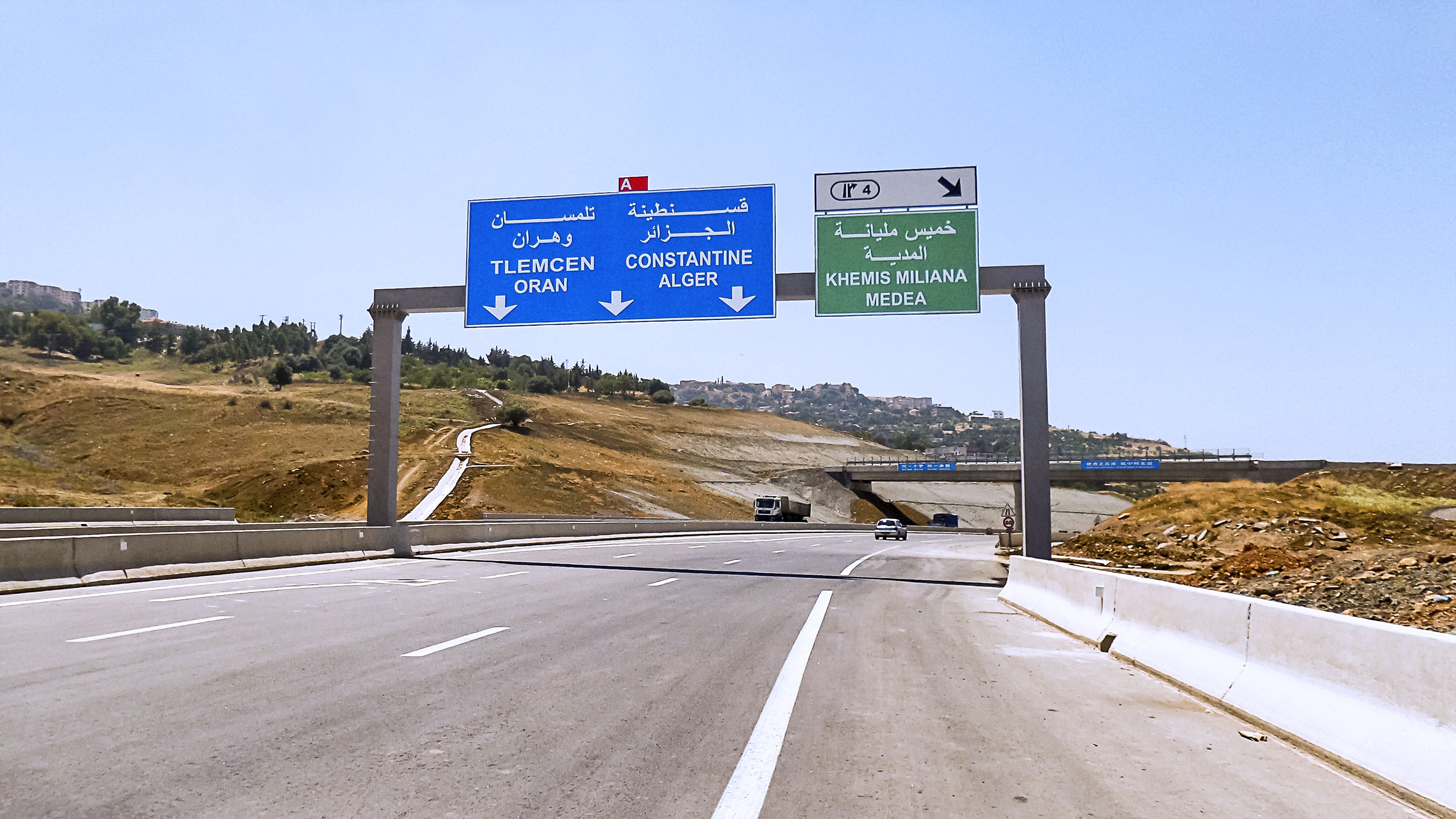
Autoroute Nord-Sud near Médéa

==== Egypt ====

Egypt has many multiple-lane, high-speed motorways. Two routes in the Trans-African Highway network originate in Cairo. Egypt also has multiple highway links with Asia through the Arab Mashreq International Road Network. Egypt has a developing motorway network, connecting Cairo with Alexandria and other cities. Though most of the transport in the country is still done on the national highways, motorways are becoming increasingly an option in road transport within the country. The existing motorways in the country are:

- Cairo–Alexandria Desert Road: Running between Cairo and Alexandria, with an extension of 215 km (134 mi), it is the main motorway in Egypt.
- International Coastal Road: It runs from Alexandria to Port Said, along the northern Nile Delta. It has a length of 280 km (170 mi). Also, among other cities, it connects Damietta and Baltim.
- Geish Road: It runs between Helwan and Asyut, along the Nile, also connecting Beni Suef and Minya. Its length is 306 km (190 mi).
- Ring Road: It serves as an inner ring-road for Cairo. It has a length of 103 km (64 mi).
- Regional Ring Road: It serves as an outer ring road for Cairo, also connecting its suburbs like Helwan and 10th of Ramadan City. Its length is 130 km (81 mi).

==== Ethiopia ====
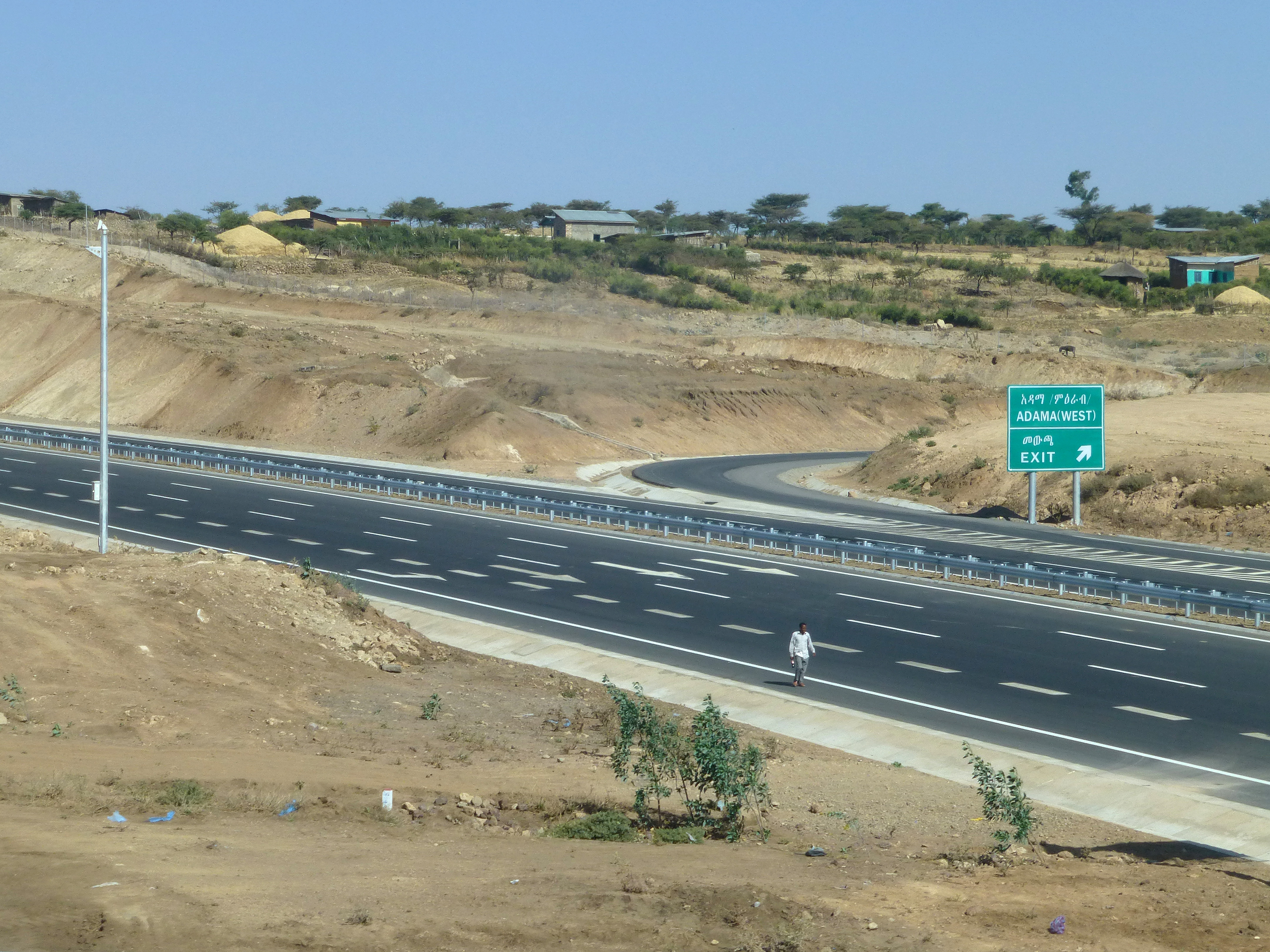
The Addis Ababa–Adama Expressway

Much of Ethiopia's highway network is developing. Road projects now represent around a quarter of the annual infrastructure budget of the Ethiopian government. Additionally, through the Road Sector Development Program (RSDP), the government has earmarked $4 billion to construct, repair and upgrade roads over the next decade. Ethiopia has over 100,000 km (62,000 mi) of roads. In 2014, the Addis Ababa–Adama Expressway opened, becoming the first expressway in Ethiopia.

==== Kenya ====
The main roads in Kenya

The Kenya National Highways Authority is responsible for the maintenance, management, development, and rehabilitation of highways. According to the Kenya Roads Board, Kenya has 160,886 kilometres (99,970 mi) of roads. Two routes of the Trans-African Highway network cross Kenya: the Cairo-Cape Town Highway and the Lagos–Mombasa Highway. Roads in Kenya are divided into classes:

1. Class S: "A Highway that connects two or more cities and carries safely a large volume of traffic at the highest speed of operation."
2. Class A: "A Highway that forms a strategic route and corridor connecting international boundaries at identified immigration entry and exit points and international terminals such as international air or sea ports."
3. Class B: "A Highway that forms an important national route linking national trading or economic hubs, County Headquarters and other nationally important centers to each other and to the National Capital or to Class A roads."

==== Morocco ====

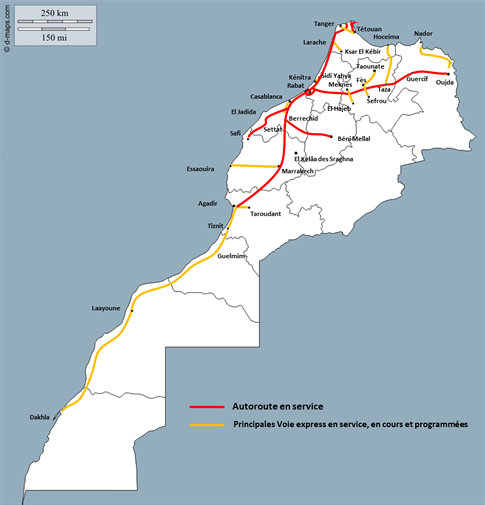
Map of Moroccan highways and expressways

The motorways and expressways of Morocco are a network of multiple-lane, high-speed, controlled-access highways.

As of November 2016 the total length of Morocco's motorways was 1,808 km (1,123 mi) and 1,093 km (679 mi) expressways. Morocco plans to expand the road network. In the country 3,400 km (2,100 mi) of motorways and 2,100 km (1,300 mi) of expressways are currently under construction in different parts of the country.

In the year 2035 the total length of the motorways will be 5,185 km (3,222 mi) of motorways and 3,700 km (2,300 mi) of expressways. According to the minister of Morocco, this plan also includes a program specific to rural roads for the construction of 30,000 km (19,000 mi) of roads for an investment of 30 billion dirhams.

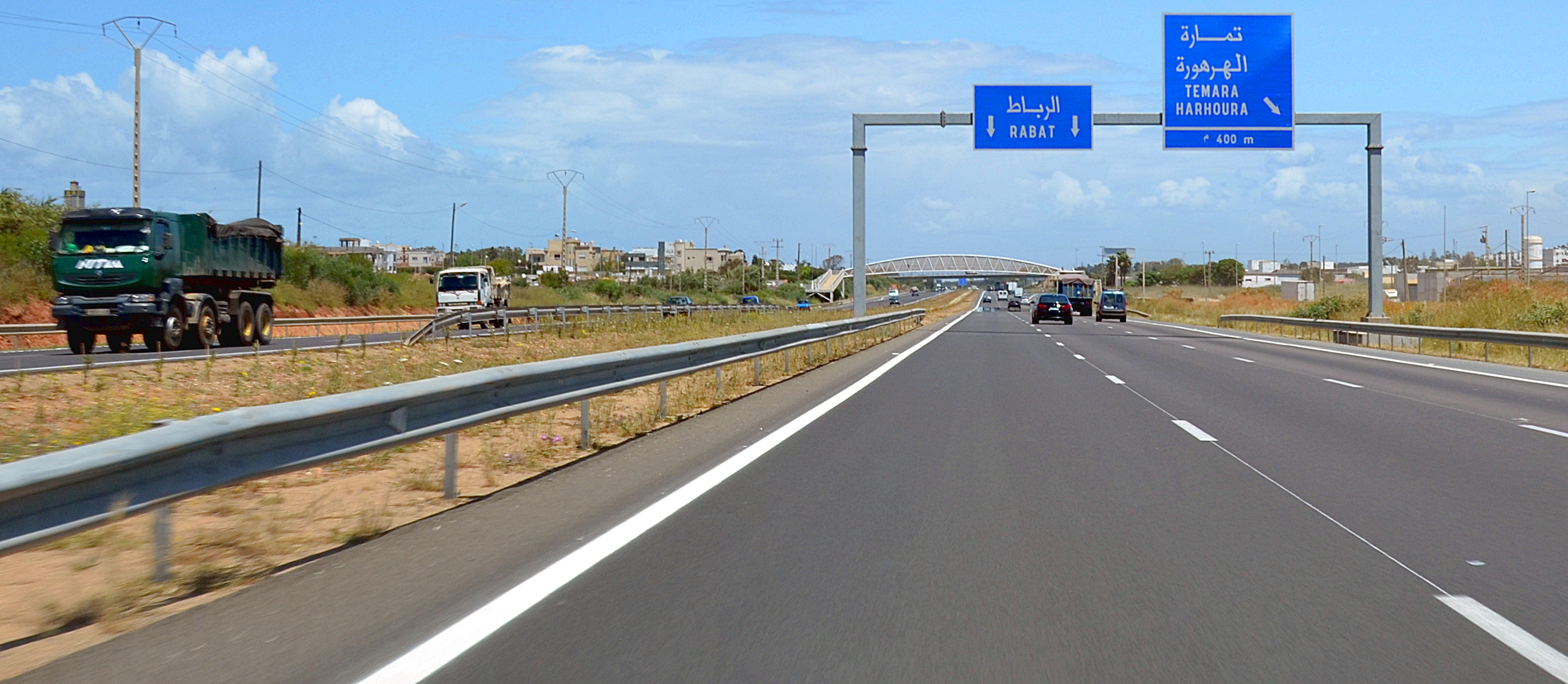
The first expressway in Morocco - A1 Casablanca–Rabat

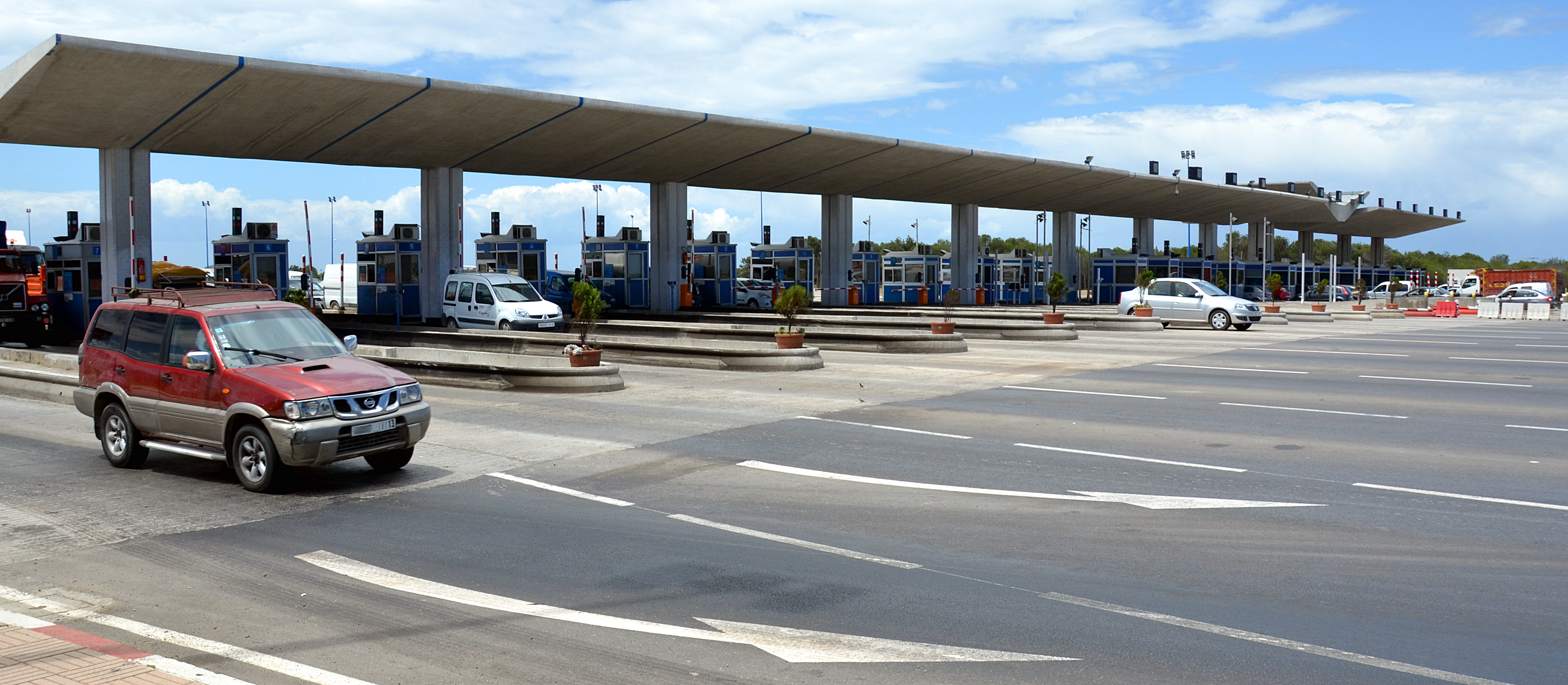
Toll station at Bouznika

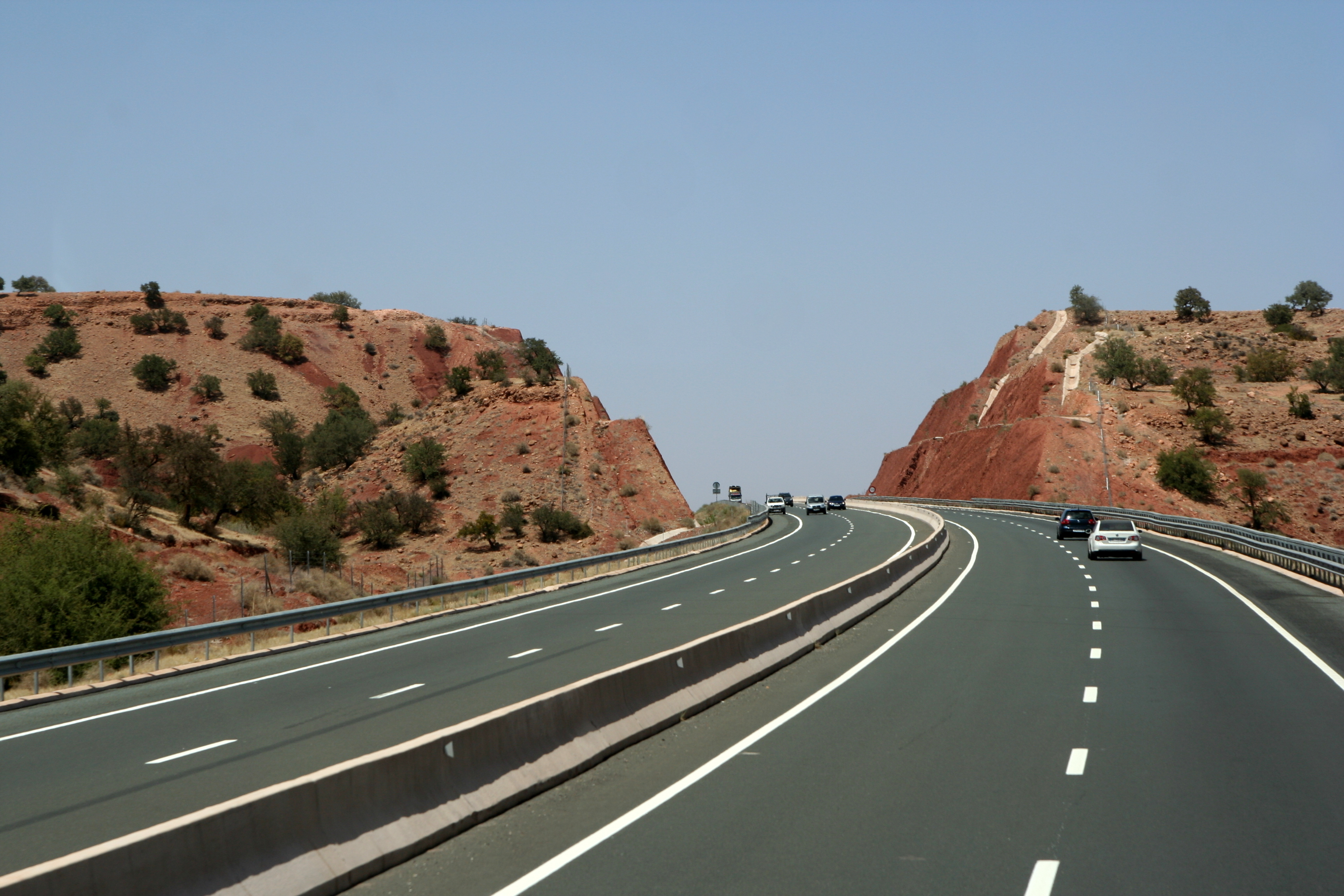
A3 Casablanca–Agadir

==== Mozambique ====
Mozambique's highways are classified as a national or primary road (estrada nacional or estrada primária), or as regional – secondary or tertiary – roads (estradas secundárias and estradas terciárias). National roads are given the prefix "N" or "EN" followed by a one- or two-digit number. The numbers generally increase from the south of the country to the north. Regional roads are given the prefix "R", followed by a three-digit number. Mozambique has over 32,000 kilometres (20,000 mi) of paved roads.

==== Nigeria ====
Nigeria has the largest highway network in West Africa. Although much of the highways are poorly maintained, the Federal Roads Maintenance Agency has drastically improved them. Due to Nigeria's strategic location, four routes of the Trans-African Highway network are situated in the country: the Trans-Sahara Highway to Algeria; the Trans-Sahelian Highway to Dakar, Senegal; the Trans–West African Coastal Highway; and the Lagos–Mombasa Highway.

==== South Africa ====

Map of National Routes

In South Africa, the term freeway differs from most other parts of the world. A freeway is a road where certain restrictions apply.

The following are forbidden from using a freeway:

- a vehicle drawn by an animal;
- a pedal cycle (such as a bicycle);
- a motorcycle having an engine with a cylinder capacity not exceeding 50 cm^{3} or that is propelled by electrical power;
- a motor tricycle or motor quadricycle;
- pedestrians

Drivers may not use hand signals on a freeway (except in emergencies) and the minimum speed on a freeway is 60 km/h (37 mph). Drivers in the rightmost lane of multi-carriageway freeways must move to the left if a faster vehicle approaches from behind to overtake.

Despite popular opinion that "freeway" means a road with at least two carriageways, single carriageway freeways exist, as is evidenced by the statement that "[South Africa's] roads include 1,400 km (870 mi) of dual carriageway freeway, 440 km (270 mi) of single carriageway freeway and 5,300 km (3,300 mi) of single carriage main road with unlimited access."

=== Americas ===
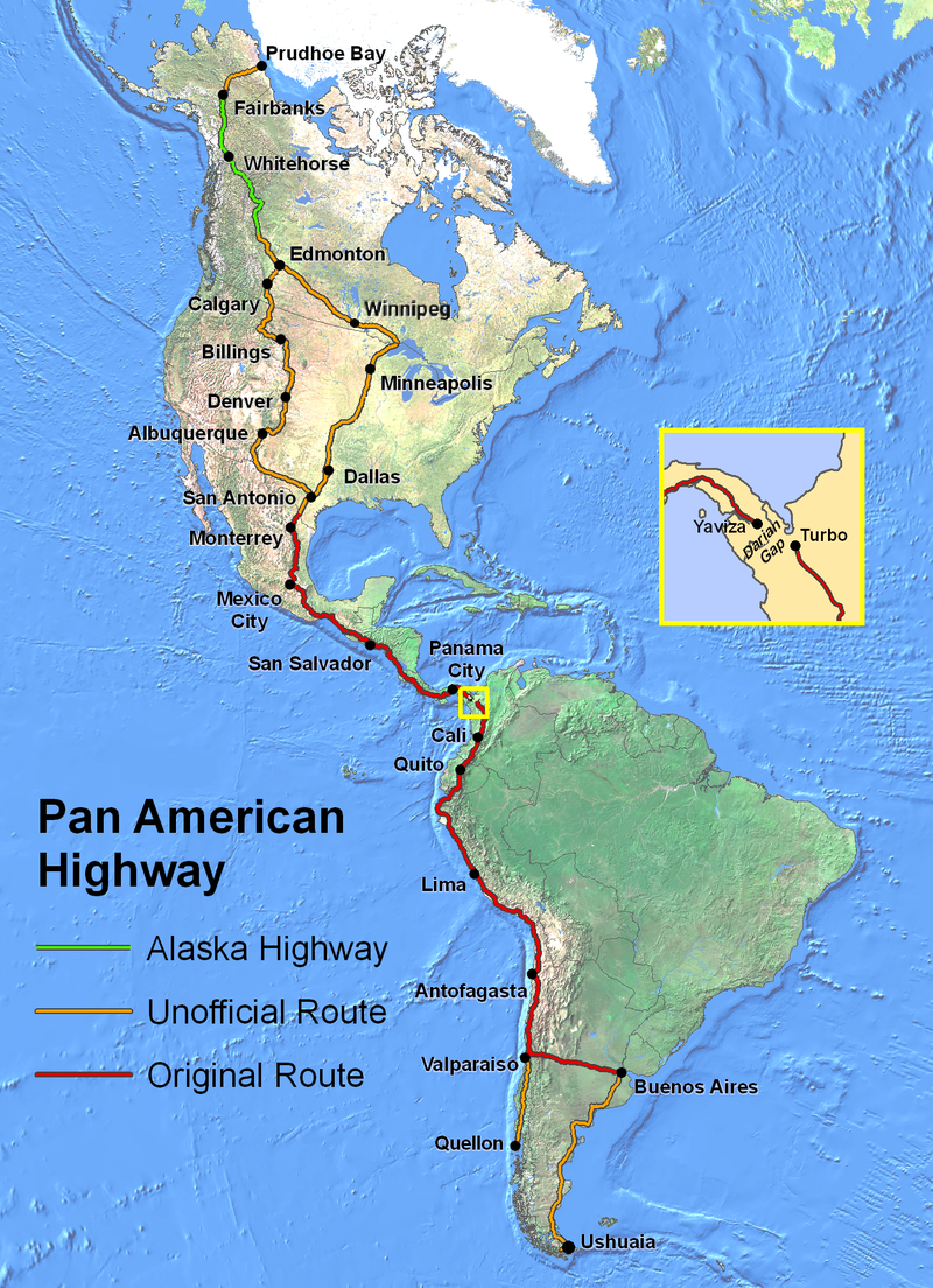
PanAmerican Highway

==== Argentina ====

Argentina has a national route system. It is connected to the Pan-American Highway. Argentina has a total of over 82,000 km (51,000 mi) of paved roads.

==== Brazil ====

Few highways in Brazil prohibit cyclists or pedestrians and are built according to the motorway standards defined by the Vienna Convention on Road Traffic, ratified by Brazil in 1980. There is no distinct designation for controlled-access highways in the Brazilian federal and state highway systems. The term autoestrada (Portuguese for "motorway" or "freeway") is not commonly used in Brazil; the terms estrada ("road") and especially rodovia ("highway") are instead preferred, though neither refers specifically to motorways. Nevertheless, the most technically advanced motorways in Brazil are defined Class 0 expressways by the National Department of Transport Infrastructure (DNIT). These expressways are built to safely allow for vehicular speeds of up to 130 km/h (81 mph). In mountainous terrain, the maximum allowable gradient is 5%, and the minimum allowable radius of curvature is 665 m (2,182 ft) (with 12% super-elevation).

São Paulo state has the most motorways in the country. It is also the state with more highways conceded to the private sector.

Brazil's first expressway, the Rodovia Anhanguera in São Paulo state, was completed in 1953 as an upgrade of the earlier undivided highway. That same year, construction of the second highway, Rodovia Anchieta, between São Paulo and the Atlantic coast, began. Expressway construction, most of them upgrades of older undivided highways, quickened in the following decades. The current Class 0 expressways include: Rodovia dos Bandeirantes, Rodovia dos Imigrantes, Rodovia Castelo Branco, Rodovia Ayrton Senna/Carvalho Pinto, Rodovia Osvaldo Aranha (also known as "Free-way") and São Paulo's Metropolitan Beltway Rodoanel Mário Covas – all modern, post-1970s highways meeting modern European standards. Other stretches of highway such as the under-construction south BR-101 and Rodovia Régis Bittencourt are of older design standards.

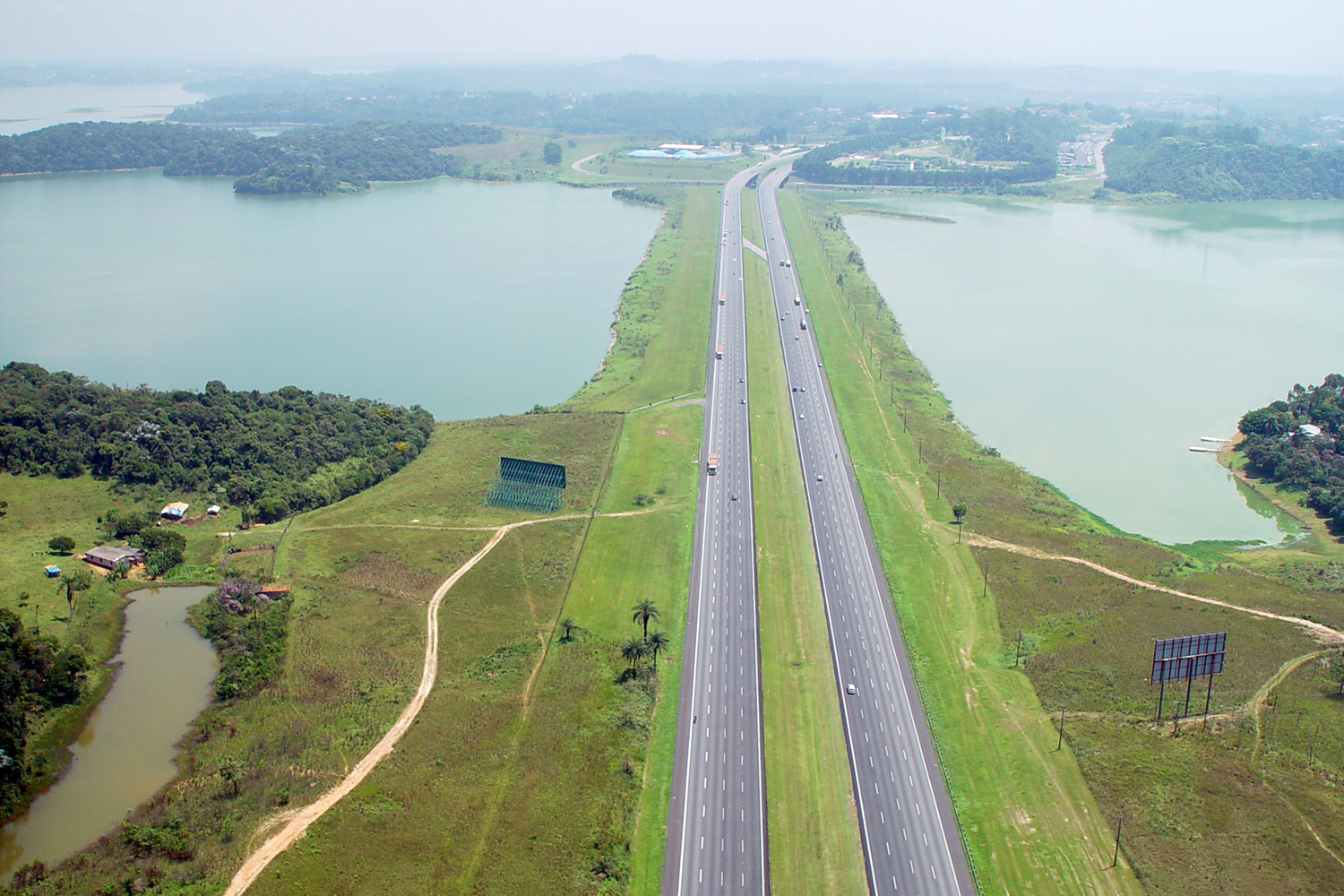
Rodovia dos Imigrantes, São Paulo

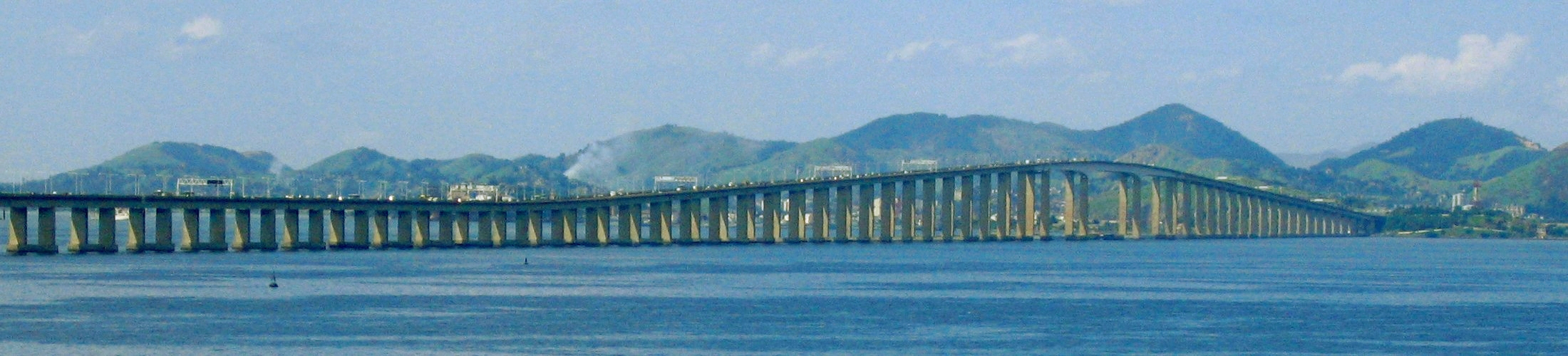
The Rio–Niterói Bridge, officially part of the federal BR-101 highway; a landmark of Rio de Janeiro

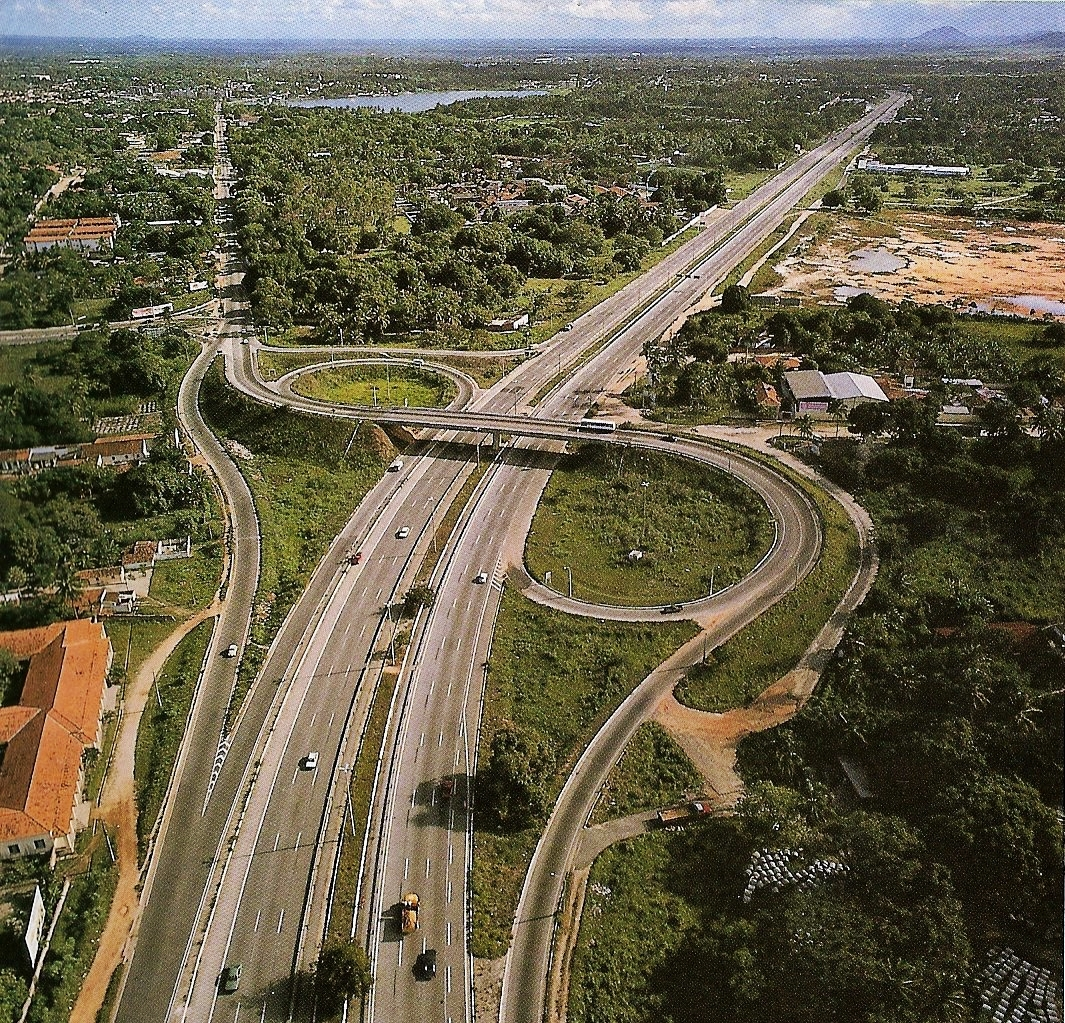
BR-116 in Ceará

==== British overseas territories ====
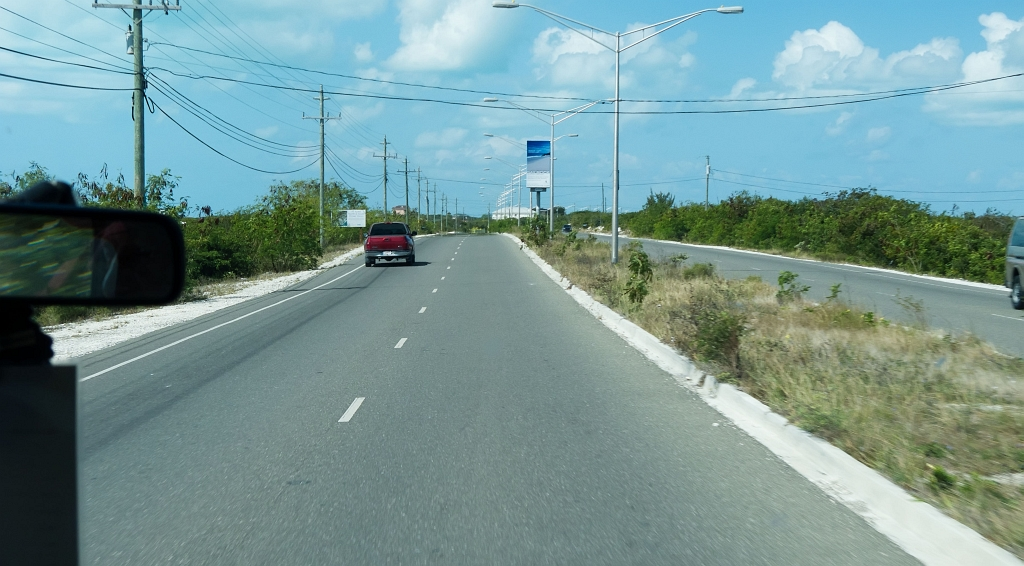
Leeward Highway, Turks and Caicos Islands, UK

A number of the United Kingdom's overseas territories have controlled-access highways, including the Turks and Caicos Islands and Cayman Islands.

==== Canada ====

Canada has no current national system for controlled-access highways. All controlled-access freeways, including sections that form part of the Trans-Canada Highway, are under provincial jurisdiction, and have no numeric continuation across provincial boundaries. The largest networks in the country are in Ontario (400-series highways) and Quebec (Autoroutes). Speed limits are not federally set, since provincial governments set speed limits for their respective regions. These roads are influenced by, and have influenced, US standards, but have design innovations and differences. The total length of dual-carriageways with controlled access in Canada is 6,350 km (3,950 mi), of which 564 km (350 mi) are in British Columbia, 642 km (399 mi) in Alberta, 59 km (37 mi) in Saskatchewan, 2,135 km (1,327 mi) in Ontario, 1,941 km (1,206 mi) in Quebec, and 1,000 km (620 mi) in the Maritimes.

==== El Salvador ====
The RN-21 (East–West, Boulevard Monseñor Romero), is the very first freeway to be built in El Salvador and in Central America. The freeway passes the northern area of the city of Santa Tecla, La Libertad. It has a small portion serving Antiguo Cuscatlán, La Libertad, and merges with the RN-5 (East–West, Boulevard de Los Proceres/Autopista del Aeropuerto) in San Salvador. The total length of the RN-21 is 9.35 km (5.81 mi) and is currently working as a traffic reliever in the metropolitan area. Although the RN-21 was to be named in honour of the first mayor of San Salvador, Diego de Holguín, due to political reasons it was renamed Boulevard Monseñor Romero, in honour of Óscar Romero. The first phase of the highway was completed in 2009, and the second phase was completed and opened in November 2012.

==== Mexico ====

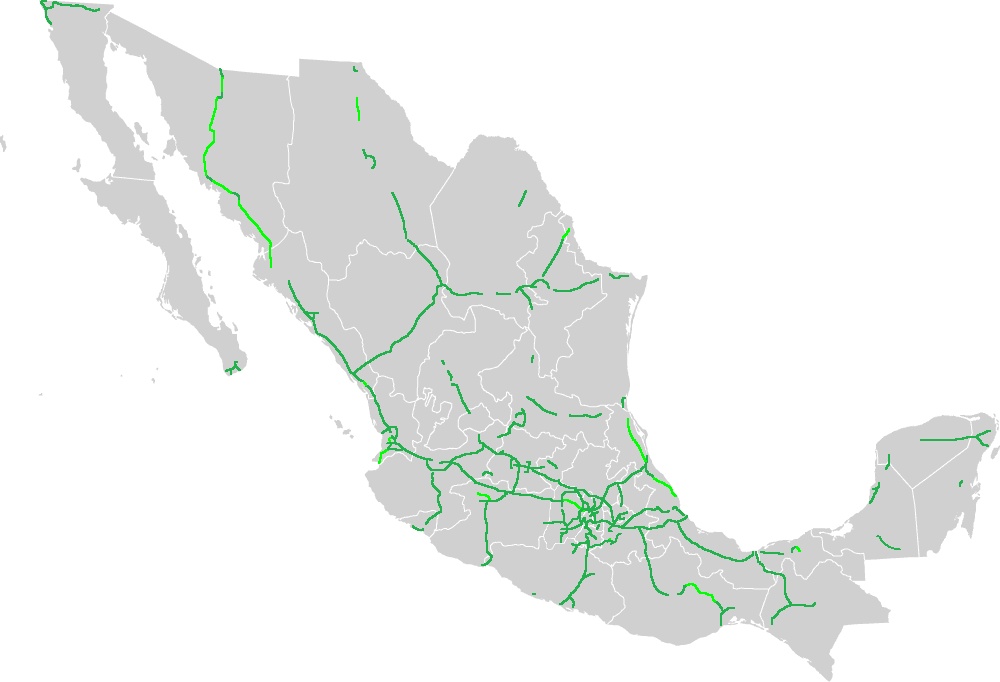
Map of Mexican autopista network

In Mexico, federal highways (Spanish: Carretera Federal) are a series of highways that connect with roads from foreign countries or that link two or more states of the Federation.

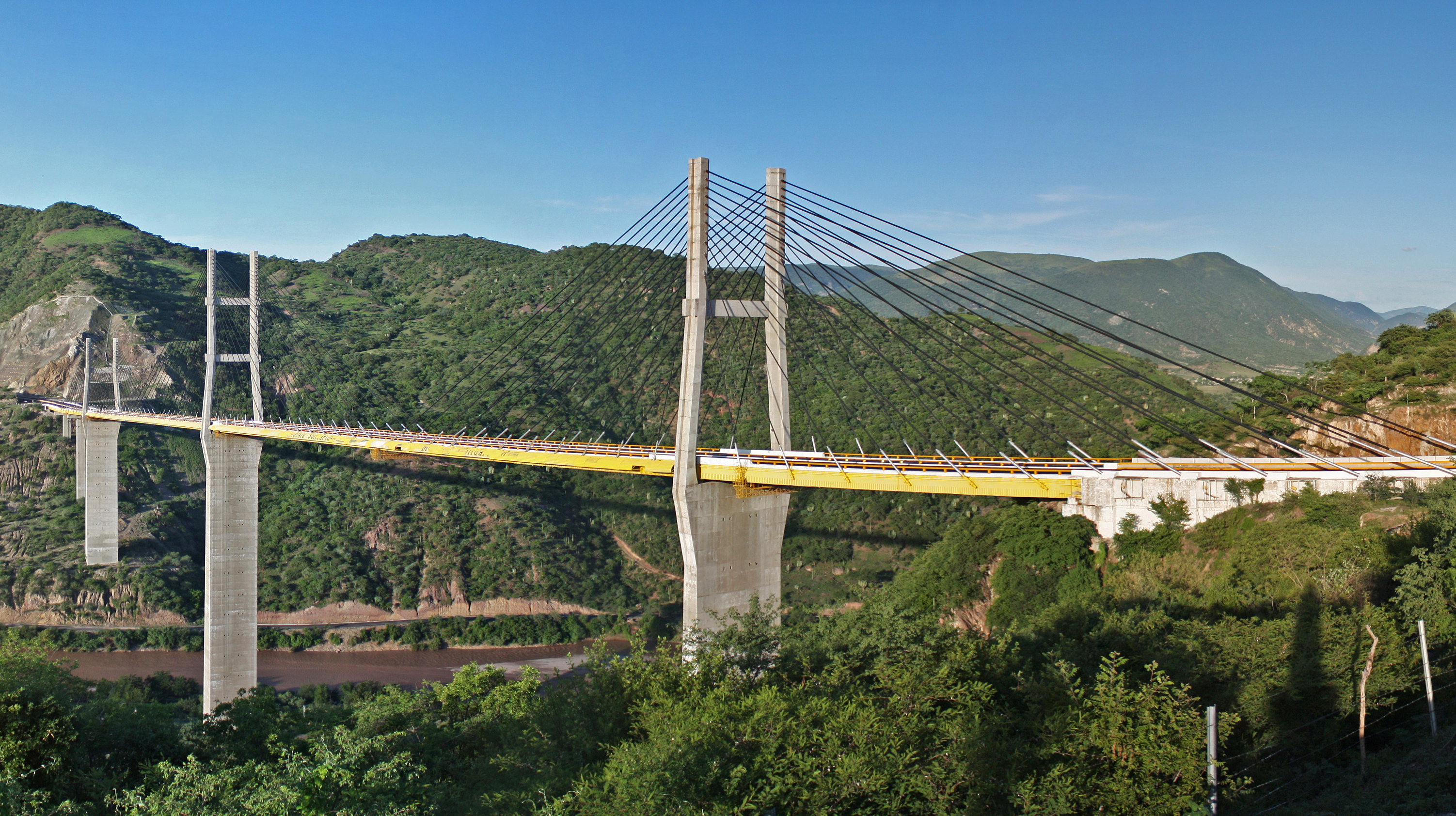
Mezcala Bridge on Highway 95 in Mexico

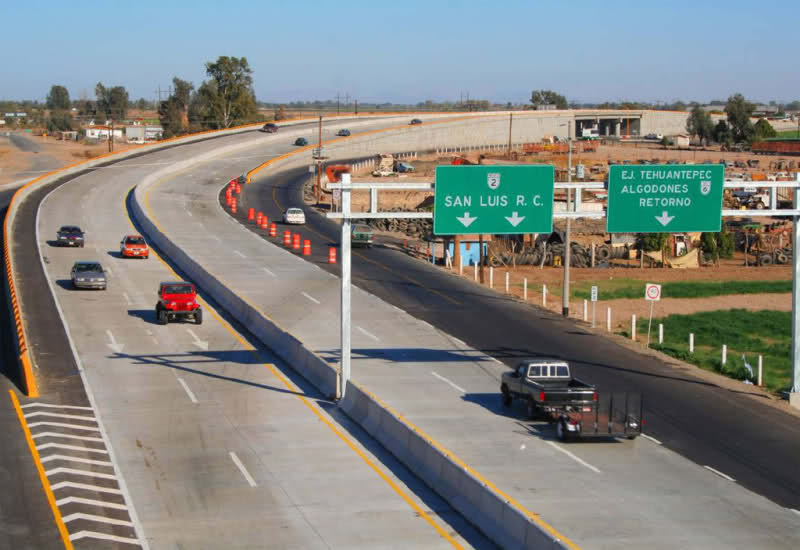
Tehuantepec, Baja California

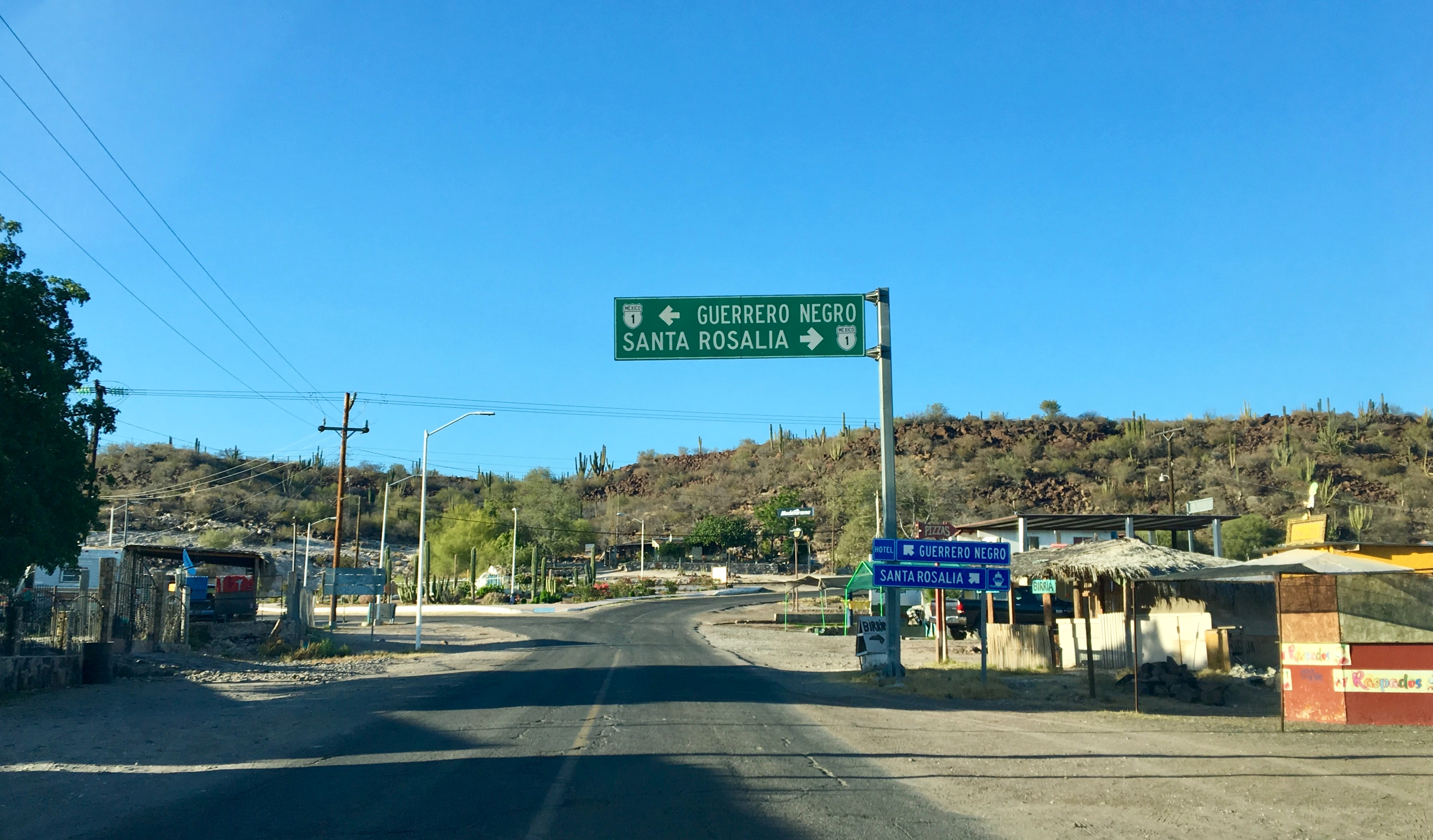
Mexican Federal Highway 1 Junction in San Ignacio, Baja California Sur

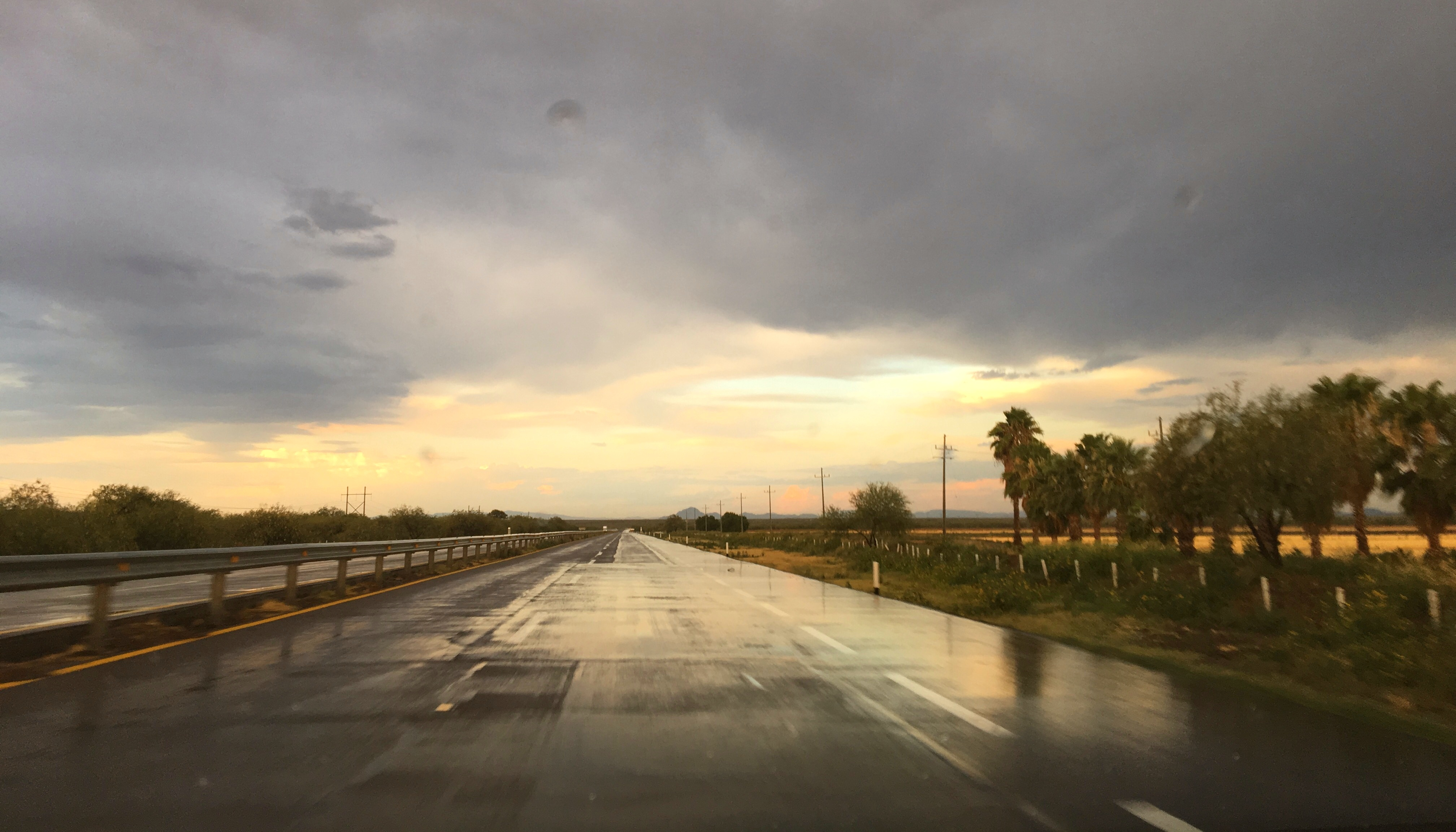
Eastbound Fed. 2 just outside Altar, Sonora, after a summer rain

==== United States ====

Interstate Highway System in the contiguous United States One or two-digit interstates Selected three-digit interstates Selected planned interstates

In the United States, a freeway is defined by the US government's Manual on Uniform Traffic Control Devices as a divided highway with full control of access. This means two things: first, adjoining property owners do not have a legal right of access, meaning all existing driveways must be removed and access to adjacent private lands must be blocked with fences or walls; instead, frontage roads provide access to properties adjacent to a freeway in many places.

Second, traffic on a freeway is "free-flowing". All cross-traffic (and left-turning traffic) is relegated to overpasses or underpasses, so that there are no traffic conflicts on the main line of the highway, which must be regulated by traffic lights, stop signs, or other traffic control devices. Achieving such free flow requires the construction of many overpasses, underpasses, and ramp systems. The advantage of grade-separated interchanges is that freeway drivers can almost always maintain their speed at junctions since they do not need to yield to vehicles crossing perpendicular to mainline traffic.

In contrast, an expressway is defined as a divided highway with partial control of access. Expressways may have driveways and at-grade intersections, though these are usually less numerous than on ordinary arterial roads.

This distinction was first developed in 1949 by the Special Committee on Nomenclature of what is now the American Association of State Highway and Transportation Officials. Prior to that distinction the first freeways were complete in 1940, the Pennsylvania Turnpike and the Arroyo Seco Parkway (Pasadena Freeway).

In turn, the definitions were incorporated into AASHTO's official standards book, the Manual on Uniform Traffic Control Devices, which would become the national standards book of USDOT under a 1966 federal statute. The same distinction has also been codified into the statutory law of eight states: California, Minnesota, Mississippi, Missouri, Nebraska, North Dakota, Ohio, and Wisconsin.

However, each state codified the federal distinction slightly differently. California expressways do not necessarily have to be divided, though they must have at least partial access control. For both terms to apply, in Wisconsin, a divided highway must be at least four lanes wide; and in Missouri, both terms apply only to divided highways at least 16 km (10 mi) long that are not part of the Interstate Highway System. In North Dakota and Mississippi, expressways may have "full or partial" access control and "generally" have grade separations at intersections; a freeway is then defined as an expressway with full access control. Ohio's statute is similar, but instead of the vague word "generally", it imposes a requirement that 50% of an expressway's intersections must be grade-separated for the term to apply. Only Minnesota enacted the exact MUTCD definitions, in May 2008.

The term "expressway" is also used in some areas of the country for what the federal government calls "freeways". Where the terms are distinguished, freeways can be characterized as expressways upgraded to full access control, while not all expressways are freeways.

Examples in the United States of roads that are technically expressways (under the federal definition), but contain the word "freeway" in their names: State Fair Freeway in Kansas, Chino Valley Freeway in California, Rockaway Freeway in New York, and Shenango Valley Freeway (a portion of US 62) in Pennsylvania.

Unlike in some jurisdictions, not all freeways in the US are part of a single national freeway network (although together with non-freeways, they form the National Highway System). For example, many state highways such as California State Route 99 have significant freeway sections. Many sections of the older United States Numbered Highway System have been upgraded to freeways but have kept their existing US Highway numbers.

In Puerto Rico, controlled access highways are named autopista. Autopistas are tolled roads in the island, but toll cabins do exist on other types of roads as well. One of the best known autopistas in Puerto Rico is the Autopista Luis A. Ferré (Luis A. Ferré Expressway), which goes from San Juan, the capital to the north, to Ponce, the island's second largest city, to the south.

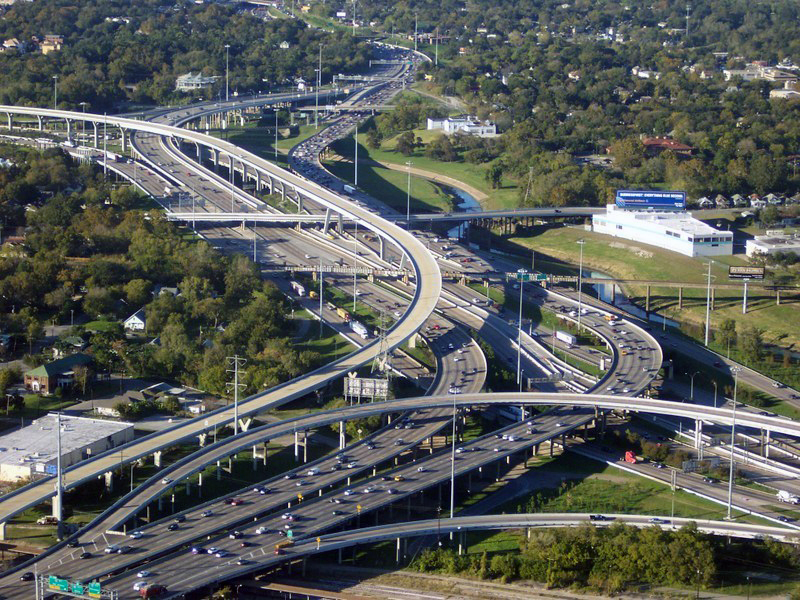
I-45 and I-10/US 90 next to Downtown Houston

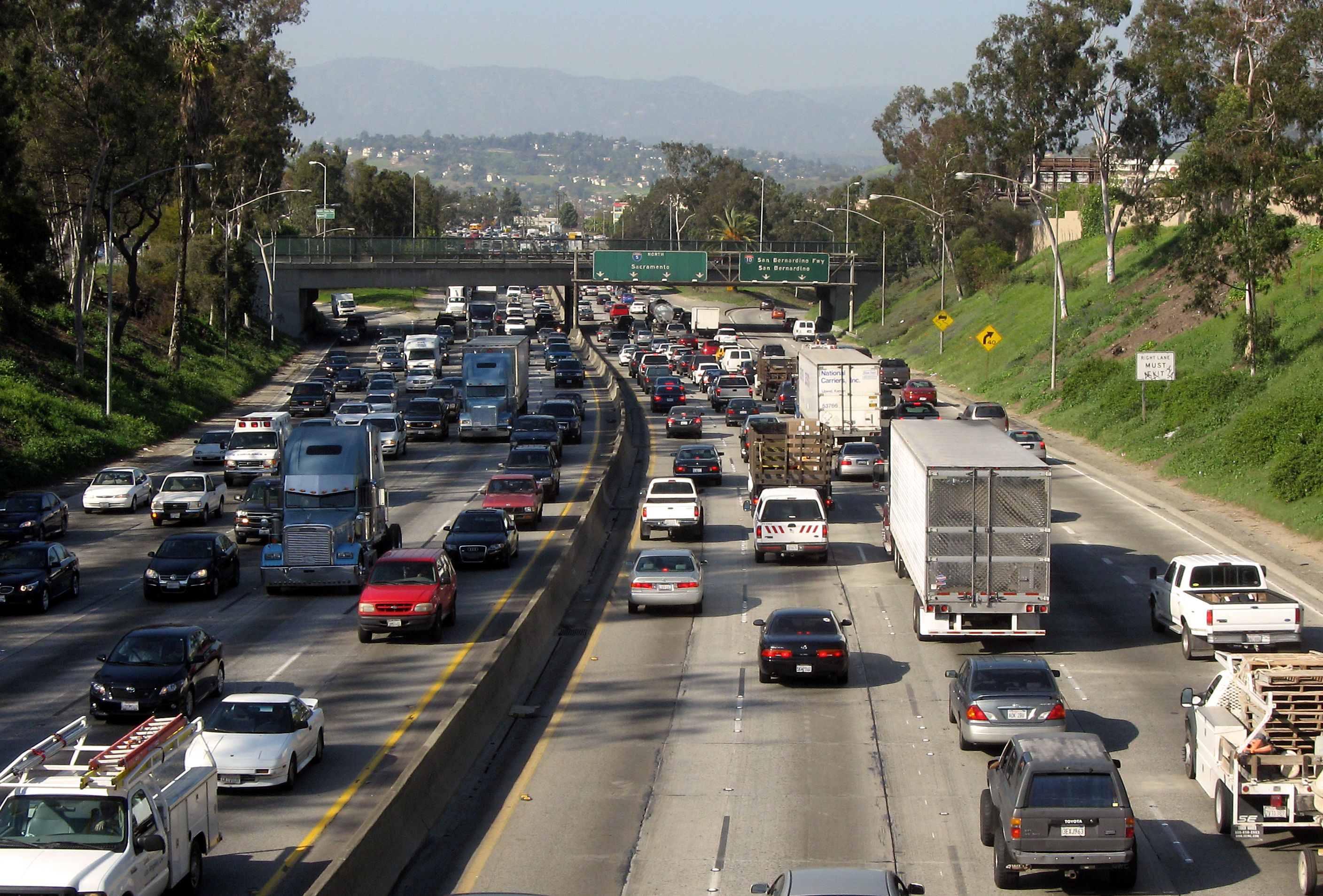
Interstate 5 (I-5) in Los Angeles

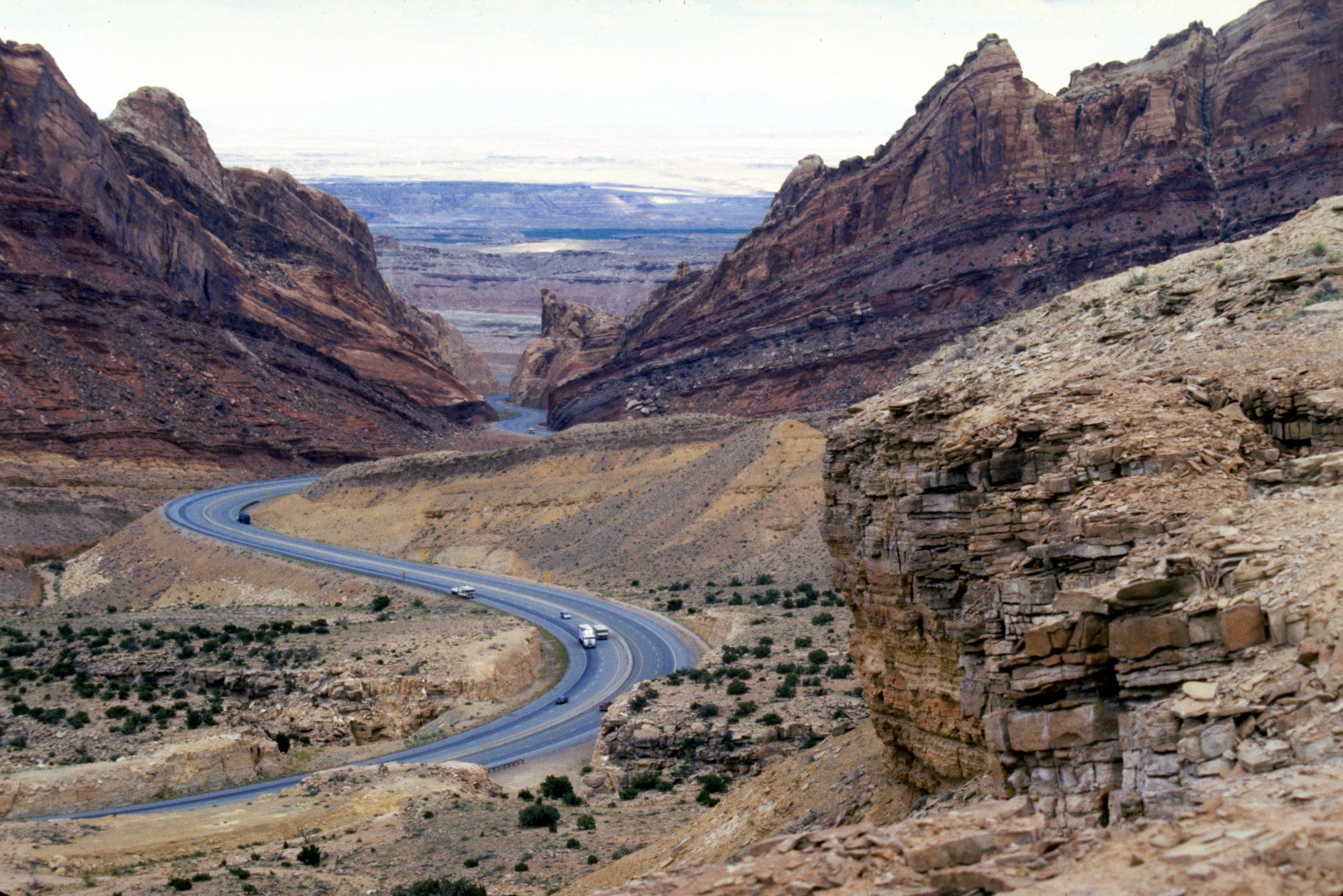
I-70 passes through Spotted Wolf Canyon at the eastern edge of the San Rafael Swell.

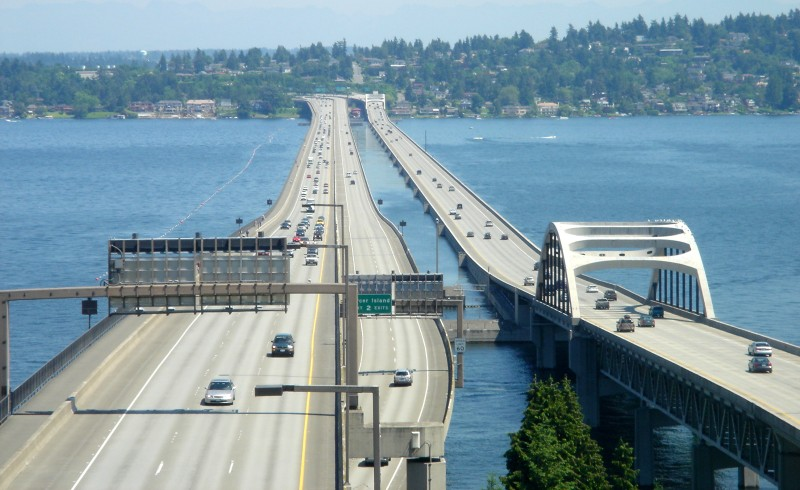
I-90 crossing Lake Washington

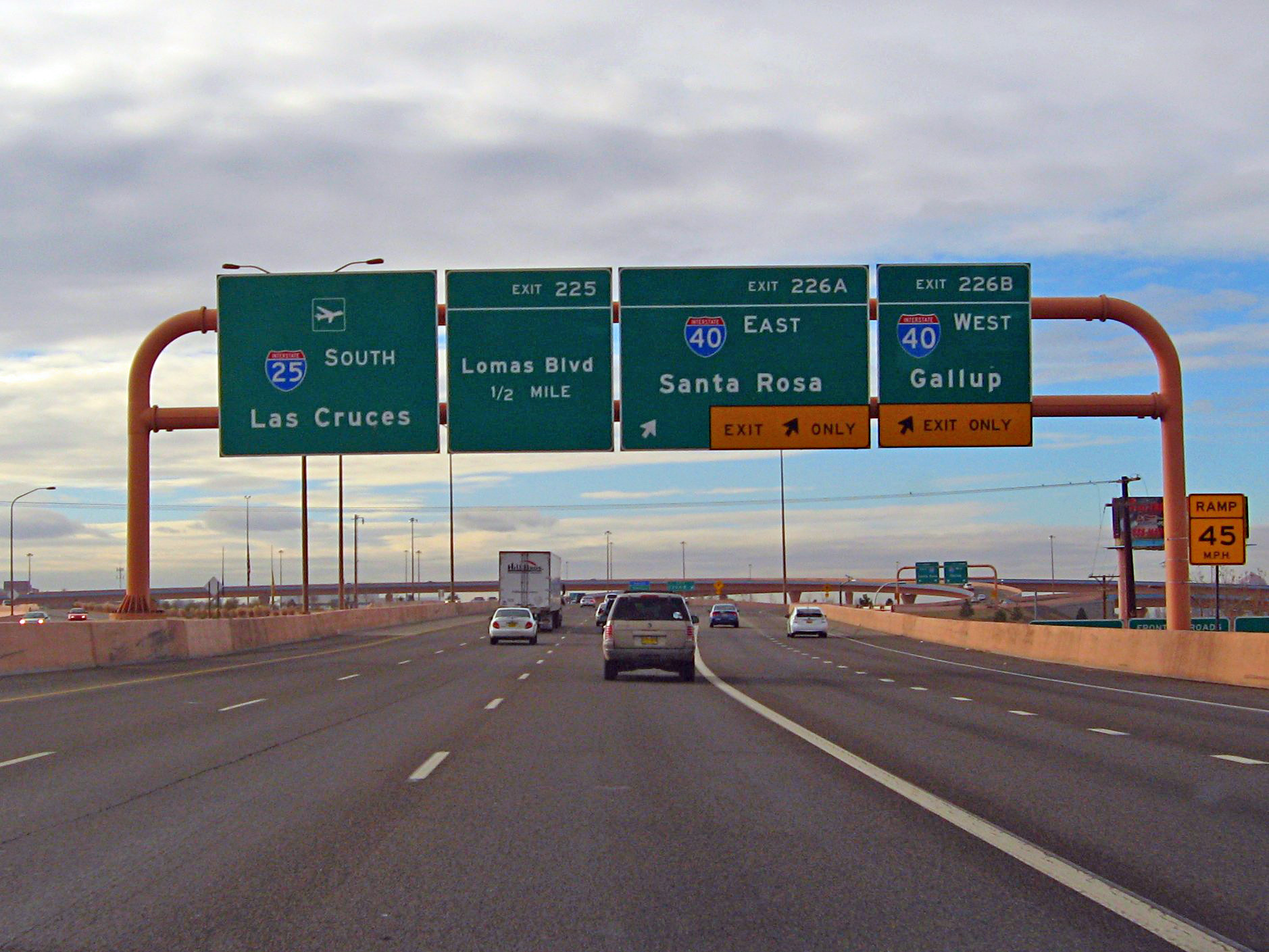
At the Big I in Albuquerque, New Mexico

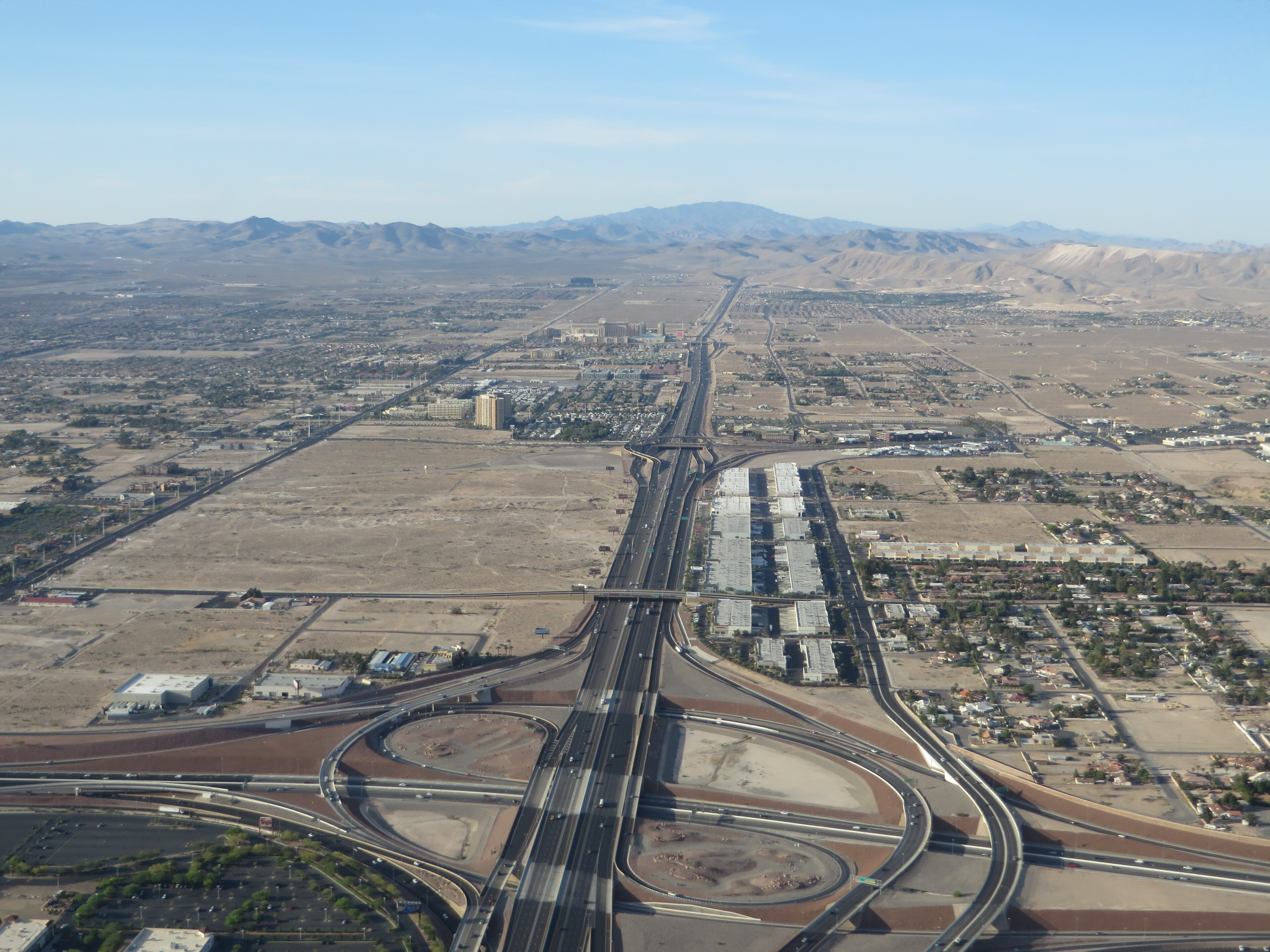
Aerial view of I-15 looking south from Sunset Road in the Las Vegas Valley

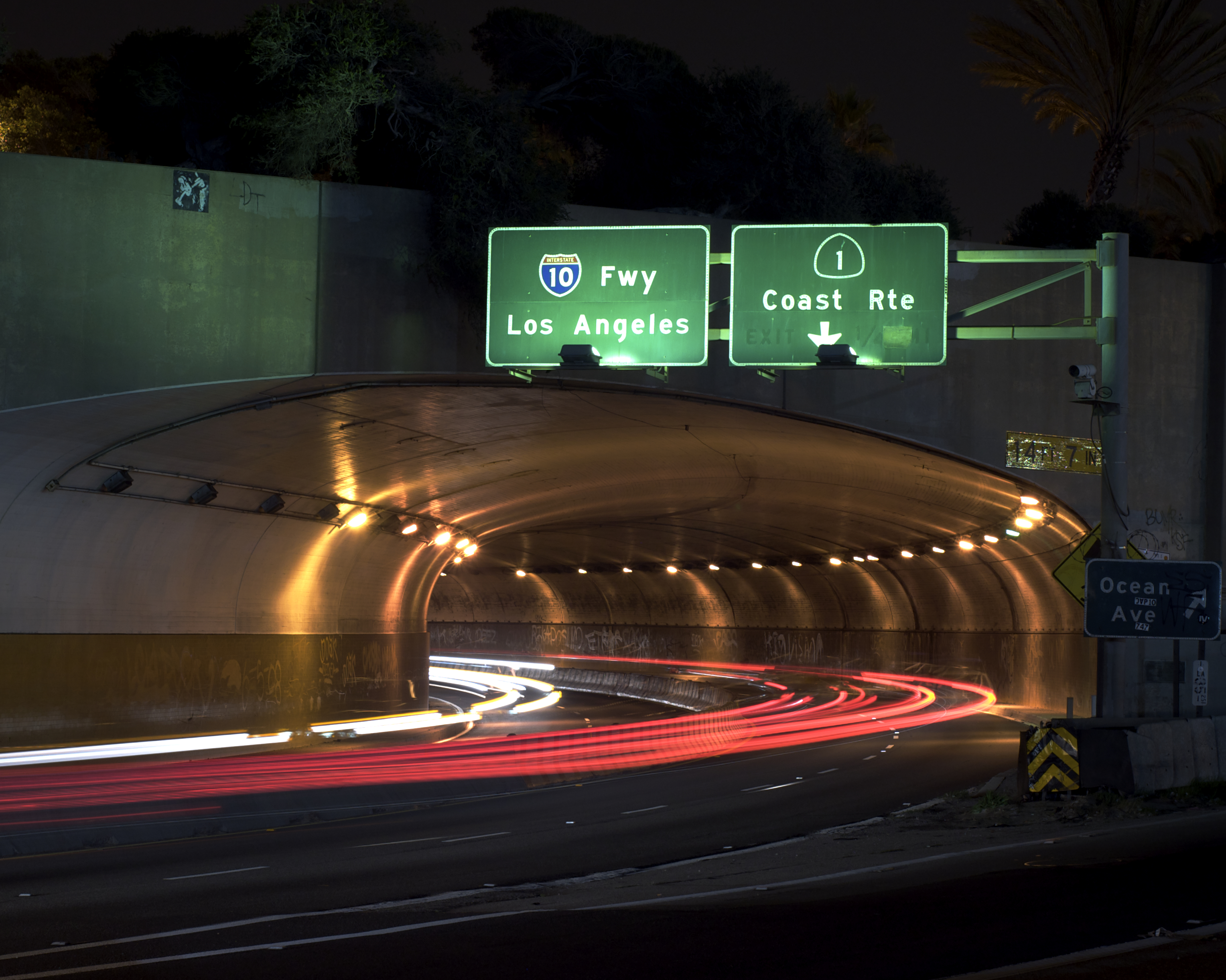
Western end of I-10 at the McClure Tunnel in Santa Monica

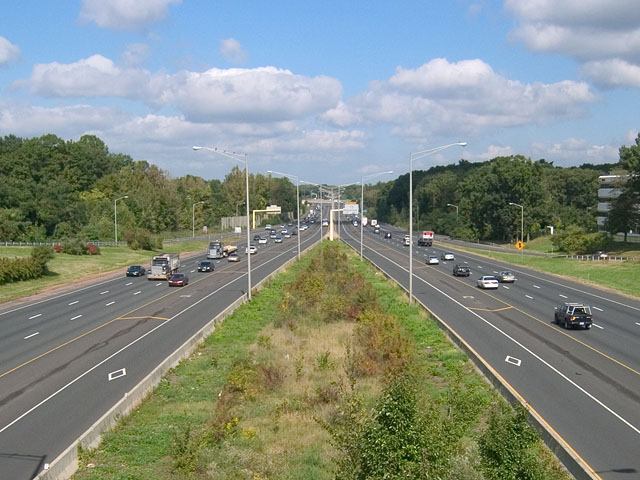
Interstate 91 with HOV lanes north of Hartford, Connecticut

=== Asia ===
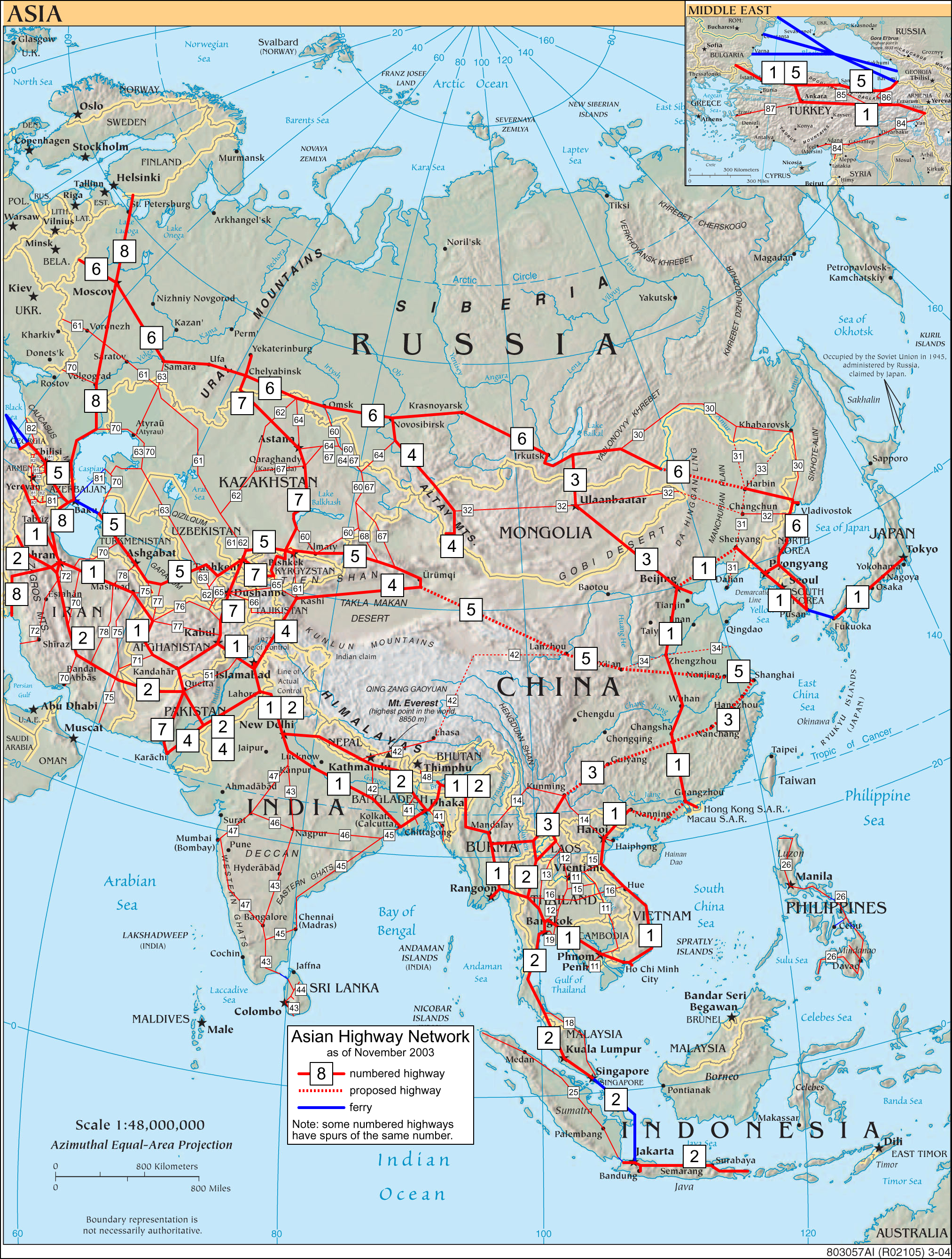
Asian highways

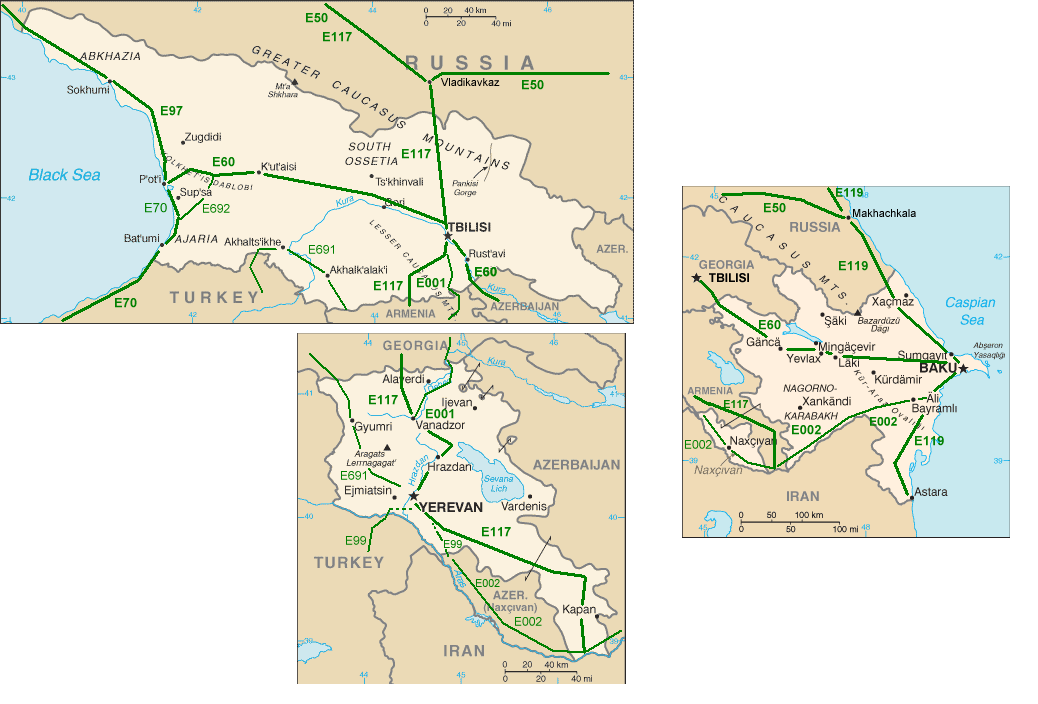
Highways of the Caucasus

==== Afghanistan ====
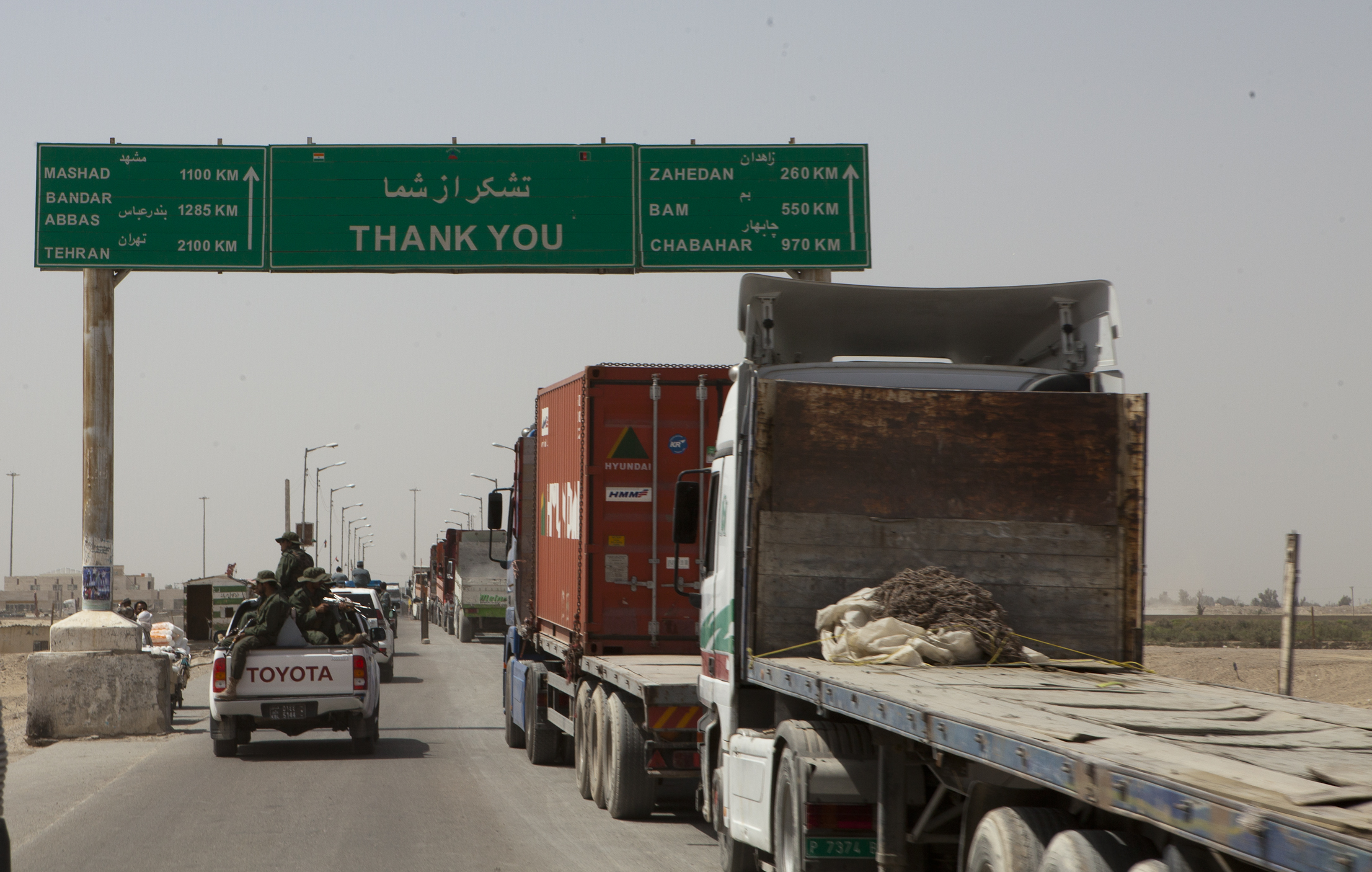
The Delaram-Zaranj Highway at the Iran-Afghanistan border

Many highways of Afghanistan were built in the 1960s with American and Soviet assistance. The Soviets built a road and tunnel through the Salang pass in 1964, connecting northern and eastern Afghanistan. A highway connecting the principal cities of Herat, Kandahar, Ghazni, and Kabul with links to highways in neighbouring Pakistan formed the primary highway. The historical Highway 1 currently connects the major cities. Afghanistan has over 42,000 km (26,000 mi) of roads, with 12,000 km (7,500 mi) being paved. The highway infrastructure is currently going through reconstruction and can often be risky due to the instability of the country.

==== Armenia ====
Armenia has about 8,140 km (5,060 mi) of paved roads, of which 96% are asphalted. Armenia is connected to Europe through the International E-road network and Asia through the Asian Highway Network. Armenia is a member of the International Road Transport Union and the TIR Convention.

==== Azerbaijan ====
Azerbaijan has about 29,000 km (18,000 mi) of paved roads; the first paved roads were built during the Russian Empire. The road network, from rural roads to motorways, is today undergoing a rapid modernization with rehabilitations and extensions. For every 1,000 km^{2} (390 sq mi) of national territory, there are 334 km (208 mi) of roads. Azerbaijan is connected to Europe through the International E-road network and Asia through the Asian Highway Network.

==== China ====

Map of the National Expressway Network of China

The expressway network of China, with the national-level expressway system officially known as the National Trunk Highway System (Chinese: 中国国家干线公路系统; pinyin: Zhōngguó Guójiā Gànxiàn Gōnglù Xìtǒng; abbreviated as NTHS), is an integrated system of national and provincial-level expressways in China.

By the end of 2019, the total length of China's expressway network reached 149,600 km (93,000 mi), the world's largest expressway system by length, having surpassed the overall length of the American Interstate Highway System in 2011. Planned length is 168,478 km (104,687 mi) by 2020.

Expressways in China are a fairly recent addition to a complicated network of roads. According to Chinese government sources, China did not have any expressways before 1988. One of the earliest expressways nationwide was the Jingshi Expressway between Beijing and Shijiazhuang in Hebei province. This expressway now forms part of the Jingzhu Expressway, currently one of the longest expressways nationwide at over 2,000 km (1,200 mi).

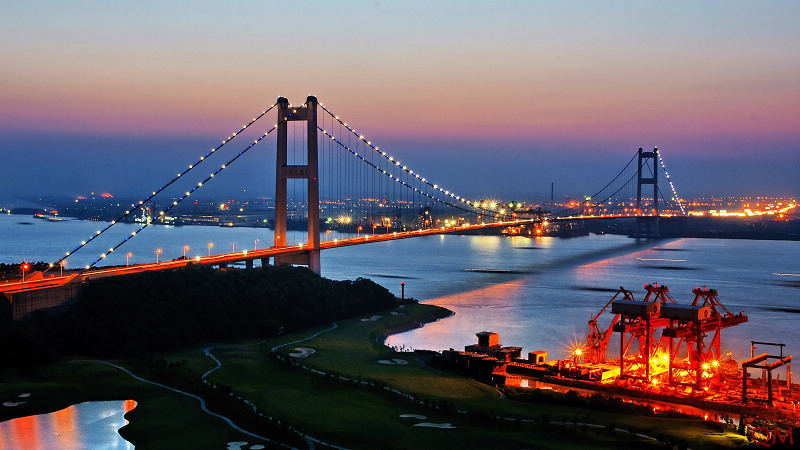
The expressway crosses the Yangtze River over the Jiangyin Suspension Bridge

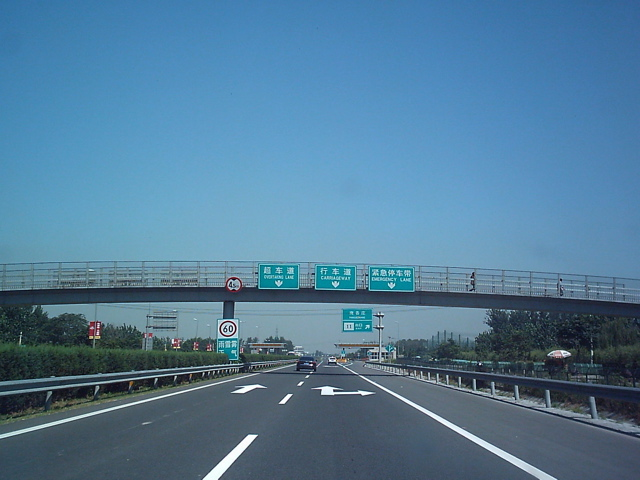
G106, Jingkai Expressway section in southern Beijing

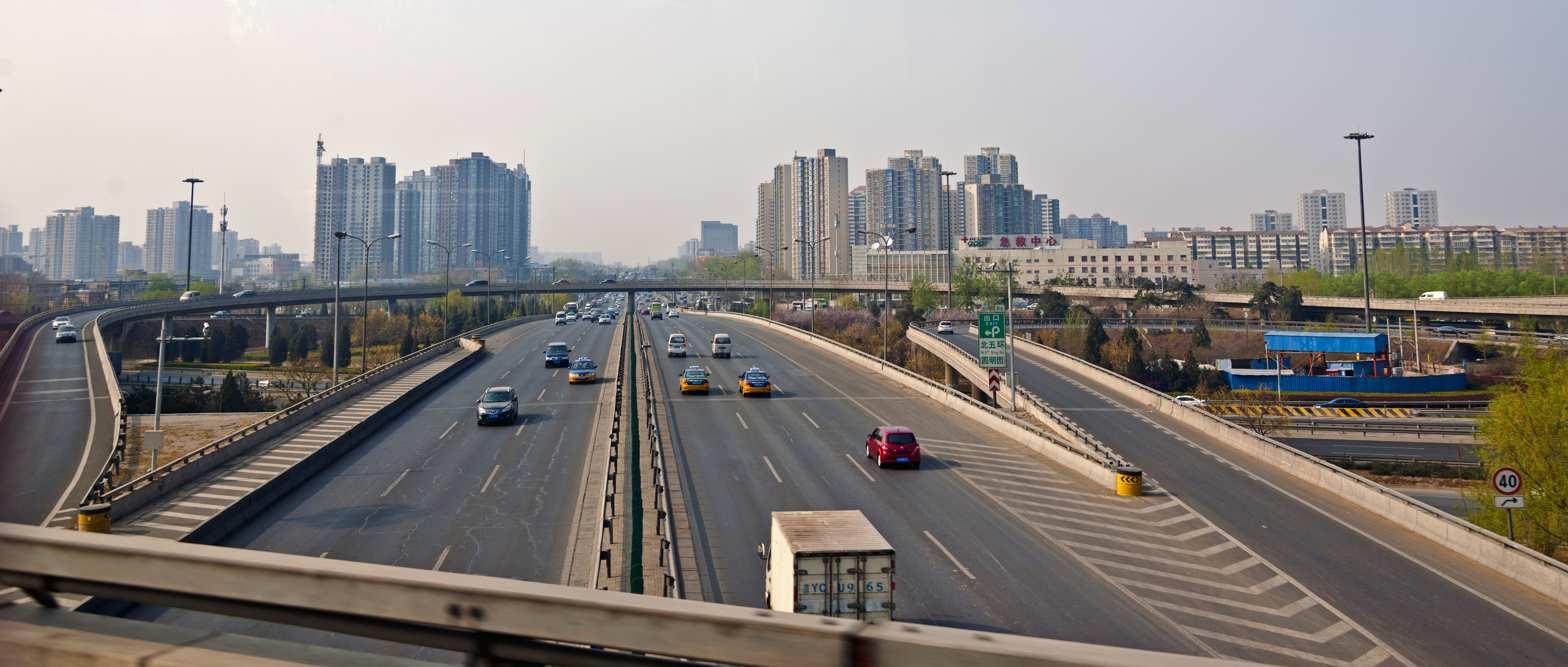
G6 expressway at the interchange with the Fifth Ring Road in northern Beijing

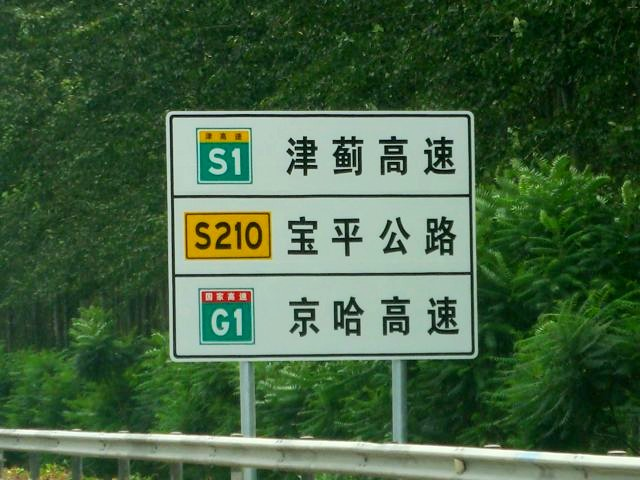
Signs using the new numbering system as seen on China National Expressway 1 in Tianjin

==== Georgia ====
National roads in Georgia

The road network in Georgia consists of 1,595 km (991 mi) of main or international highways in good condition, of which by 2021 roughly 230 kilometres (140 mi) are controlled-access highway, while further expansion is ongoing. The 7,000 kilometres (4,300 mi) of domestic main roads are of mixed quality, although the conditions are improving. Some 12,400 kilometres (7,700 mi) of local roads are generally in poor condition. Georgia is connected to Europe via the International E-road network and Asia through the Asian Highway Network.

==== Hong Kong ====

In Hong Kong major motorways are numbered from 1 to 10 in addition to their names. Speed limits on expressways typically range from 70 to 110 km/h (43 to 68 mph).

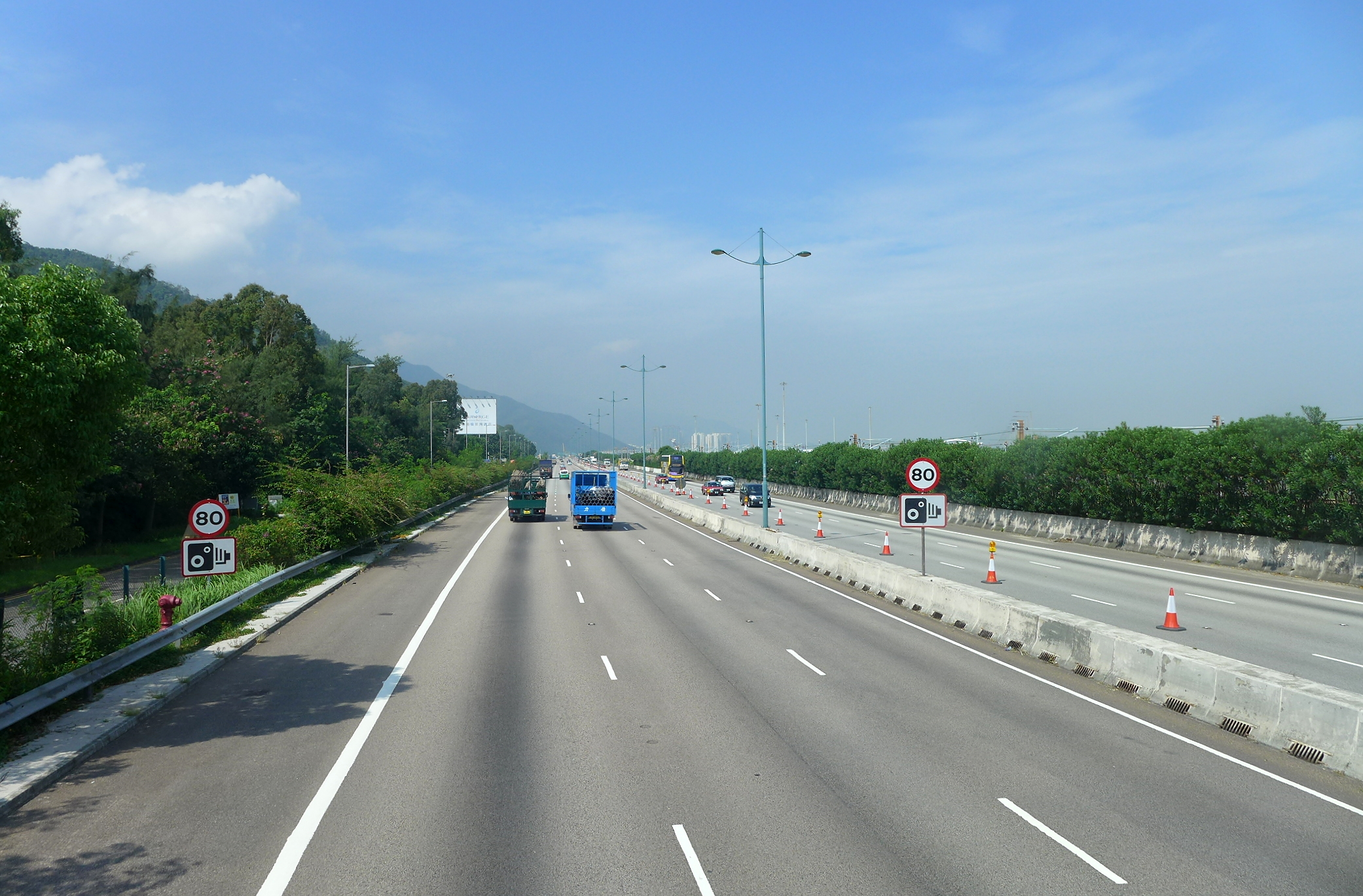
North Lantau Highway on Lantau Island

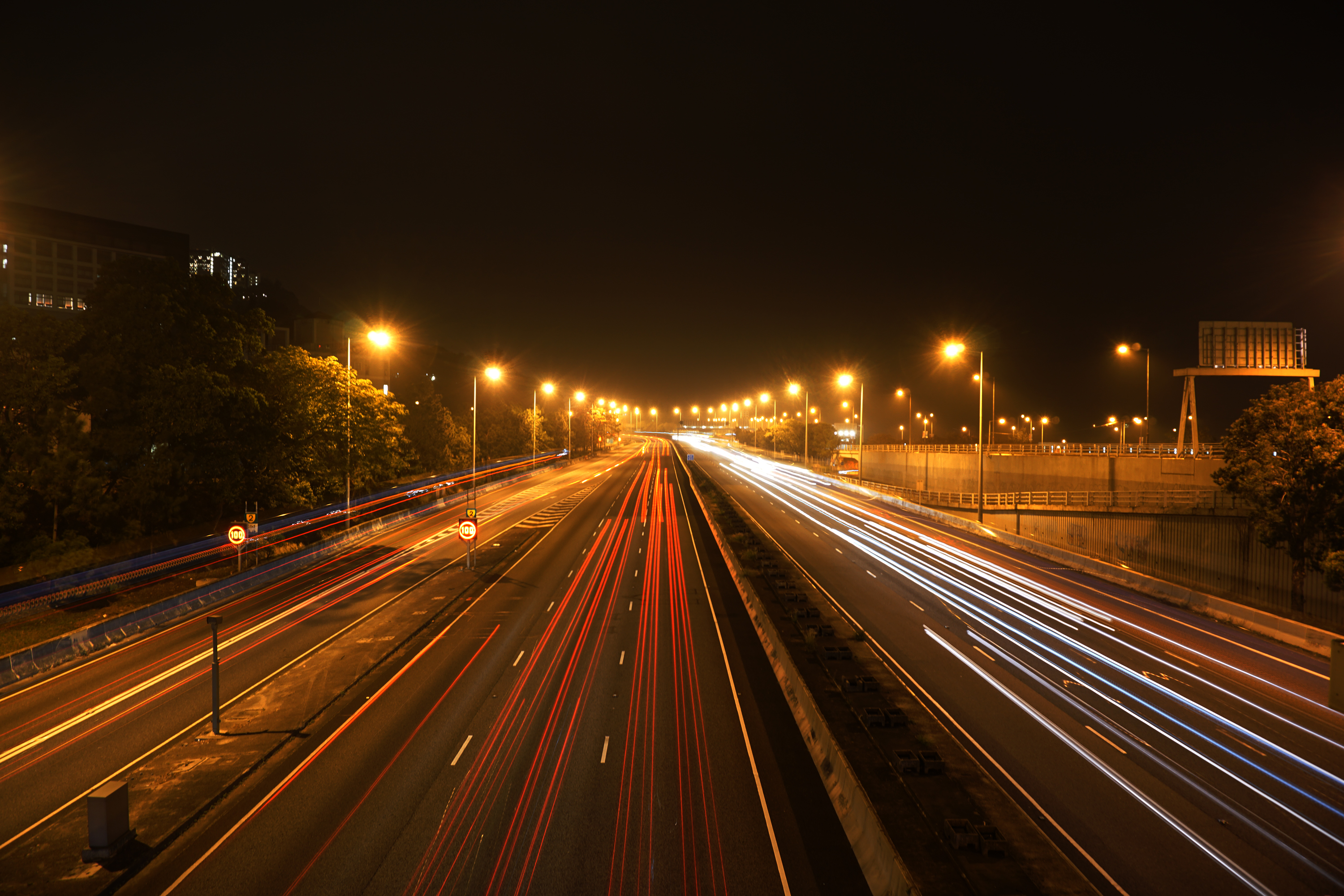
Tolo Highway in Ma Liu Shui

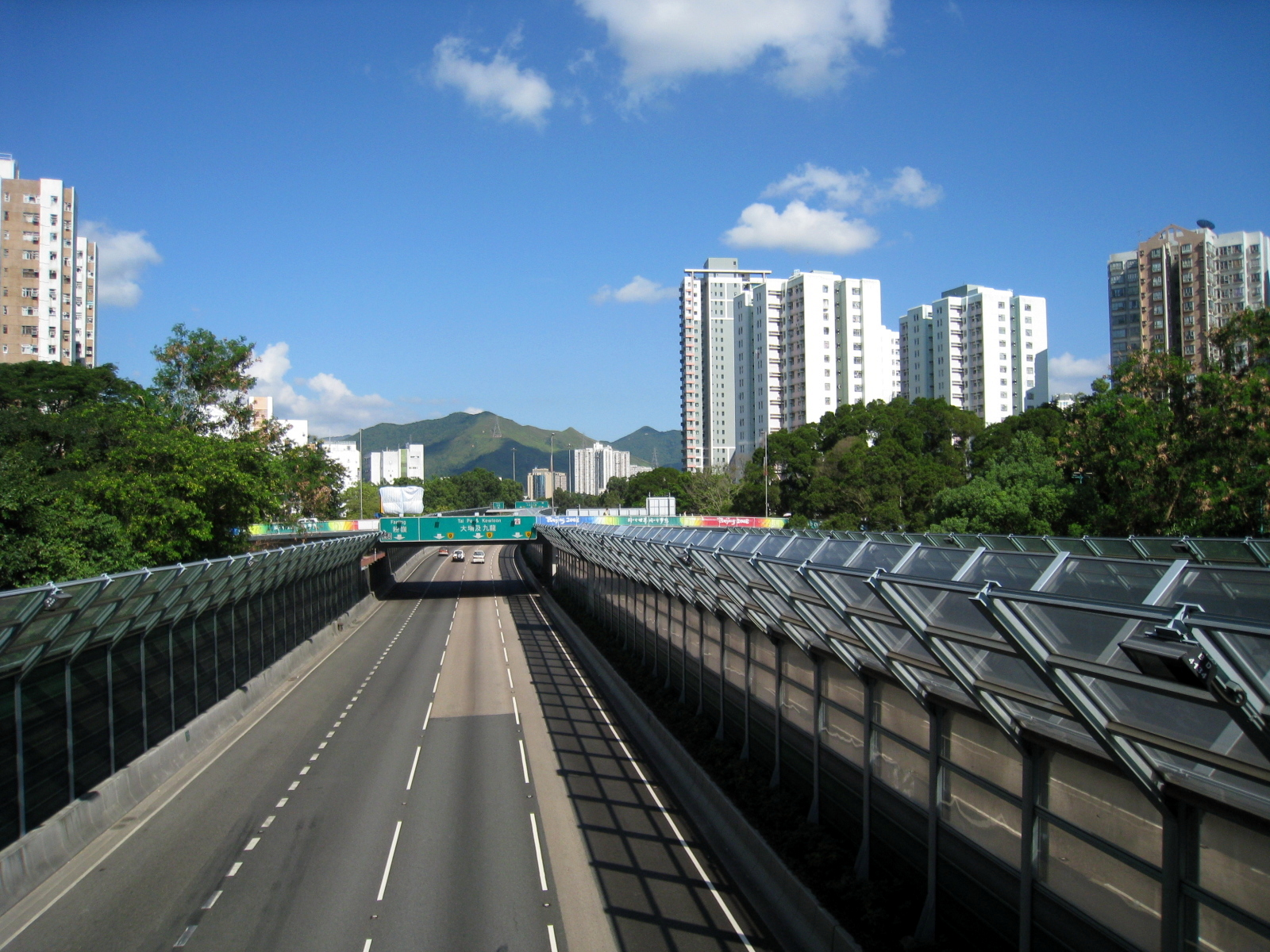
Fanling Highway in Sheung Shui

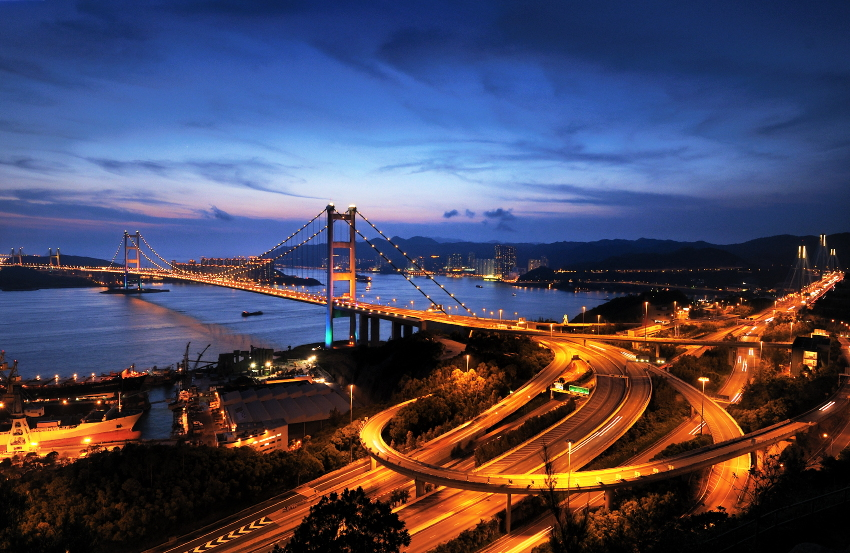
North West Tsing Yi Interchange near Tsing Ma Bridge (Lantau Link)

==== India ====

Expressways (known as "Gatimarg/गतिमार्ग", or "Speedways" in Hindi and other Indian languages) are the highest class of roads in India's road network and currently make up around 7,332 km (4,556 mi) of the National Highway System, with additional 11,127.69 km (6,914.43 mi) under various phases of implementation. They have a minimum of six or eight-lane controlled-access highways where entrance and exit is controlled by the use of slip roads. The expressways are operated and maintained by the Union, through the National Highways Authority of India.

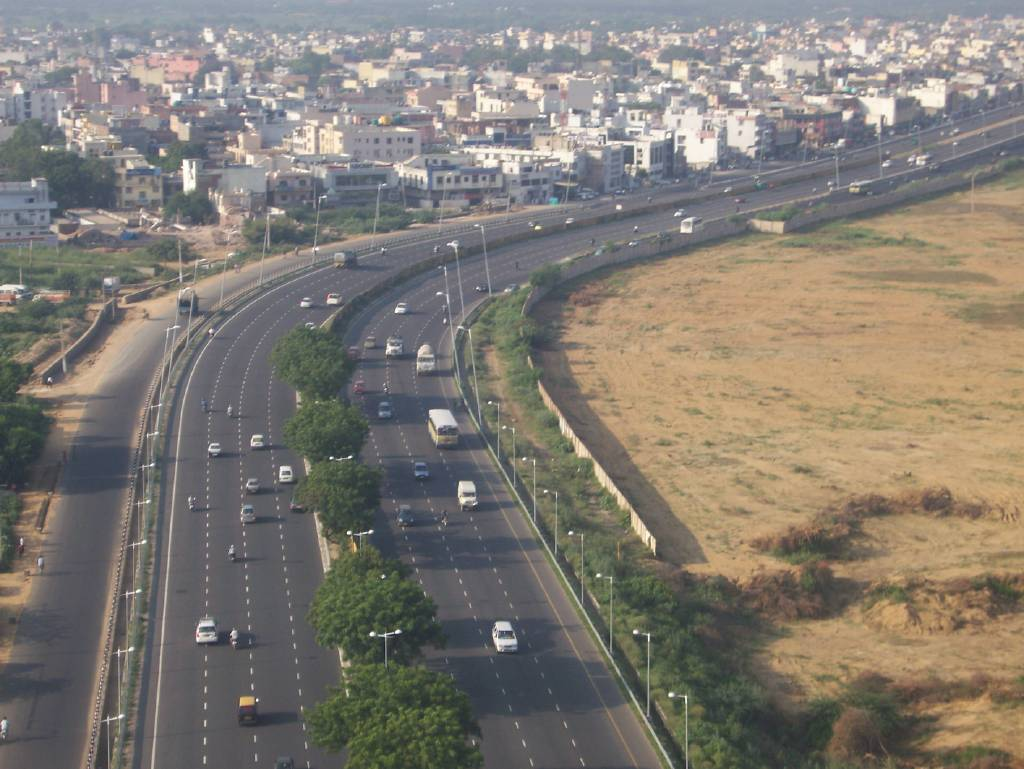
Section of the Delhi Gurgaon Expressway

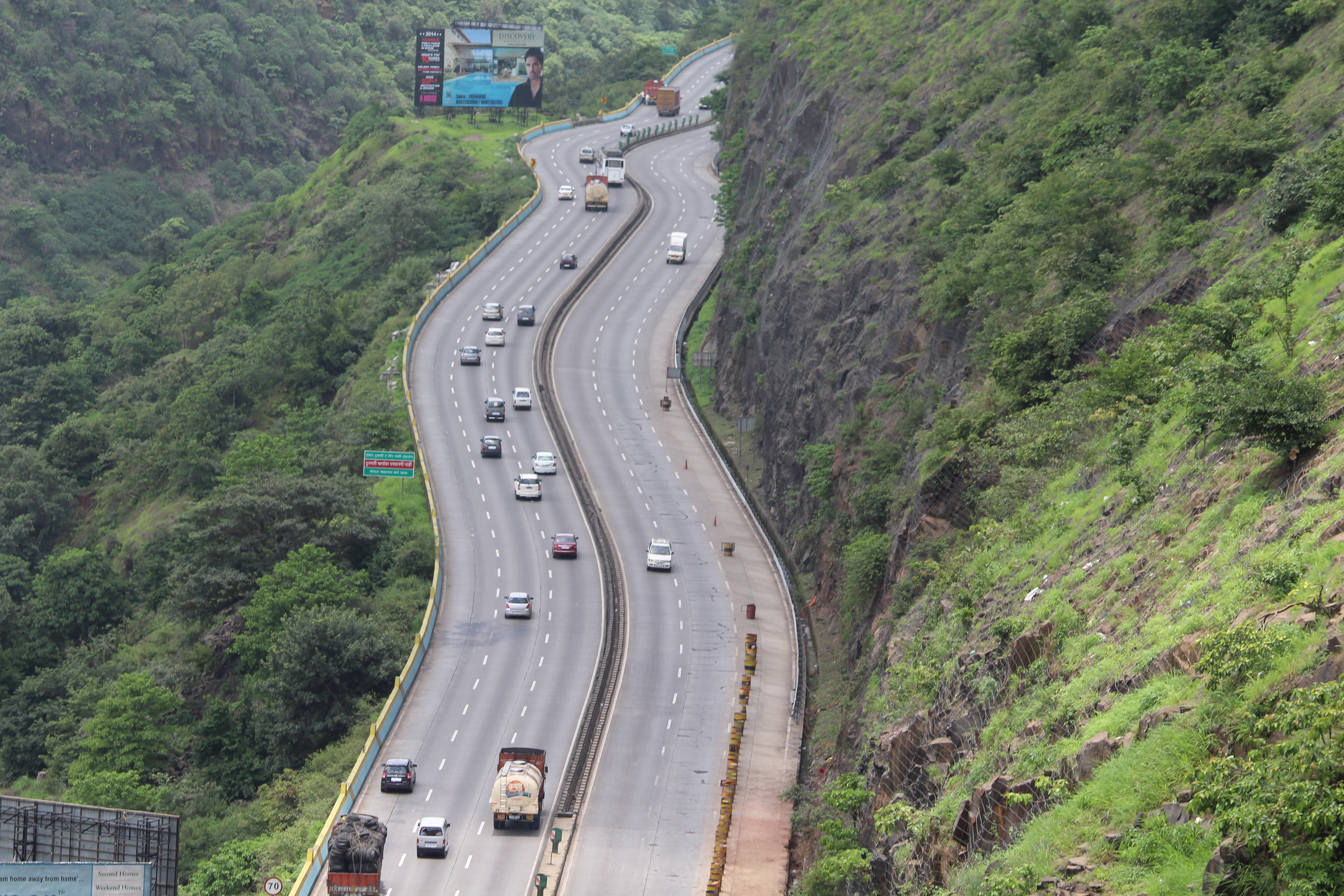
The Mumbai-Pune Expressway

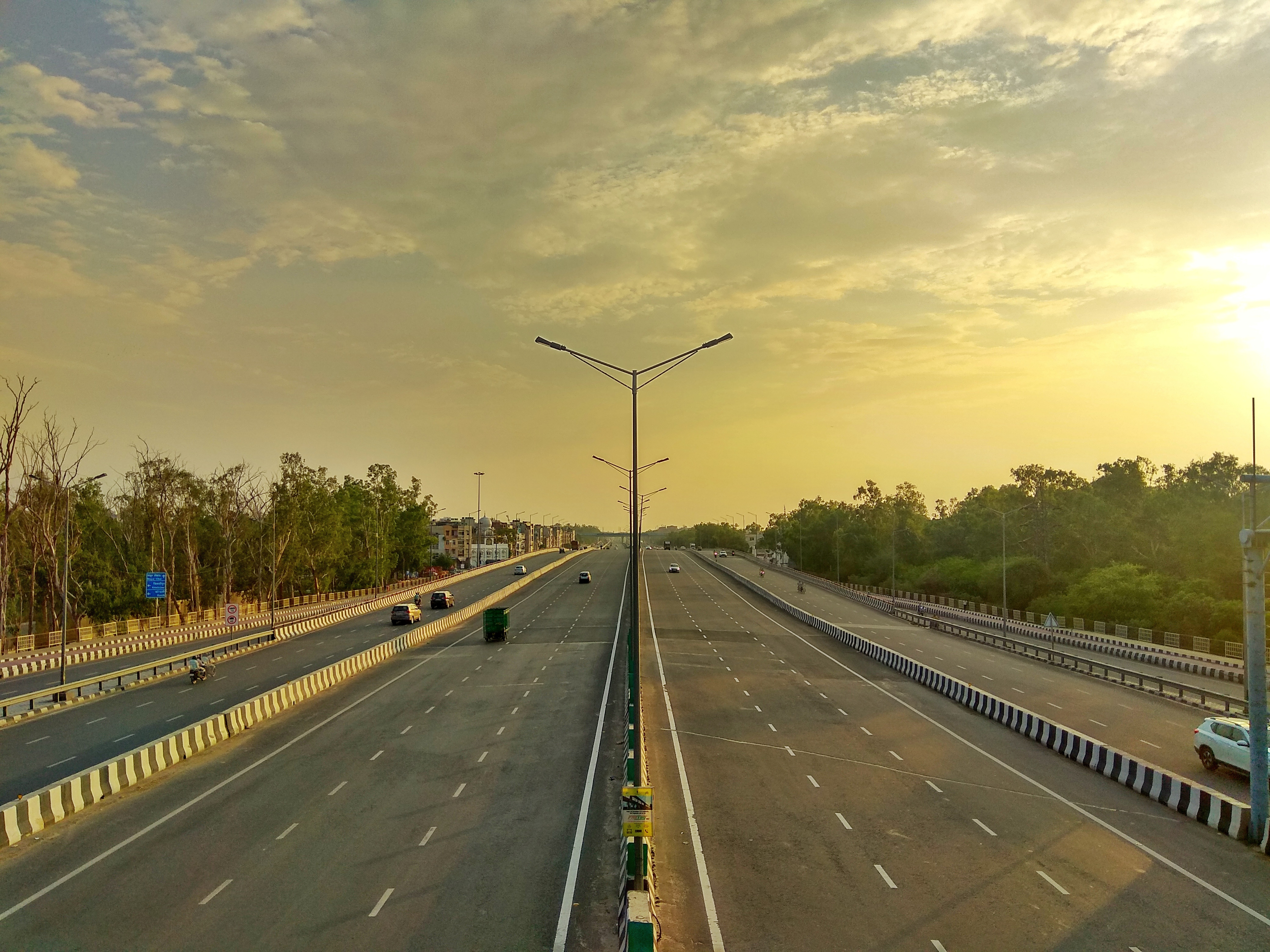
The Delhi-Meerut Expressway

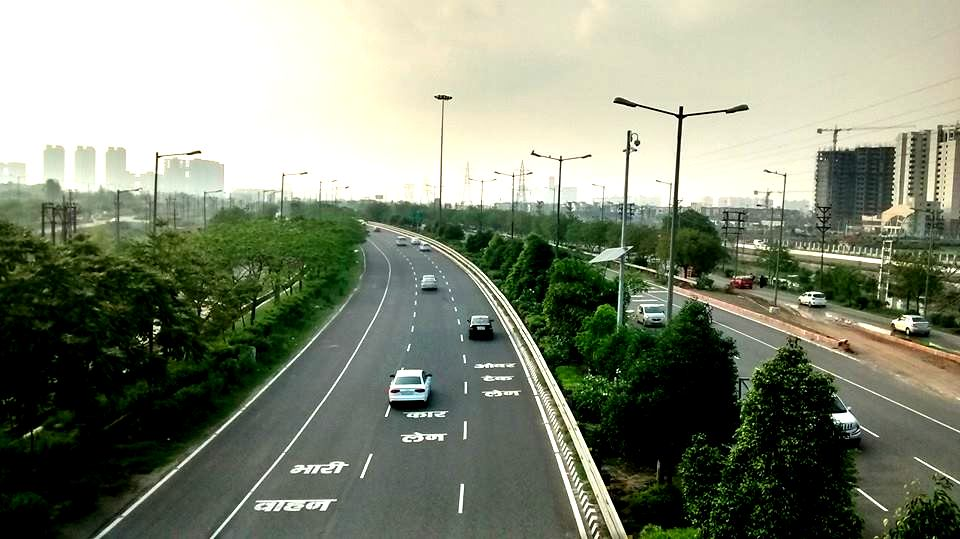
A section of Noida–Greater Noida Expressway

==== Indonesia ====

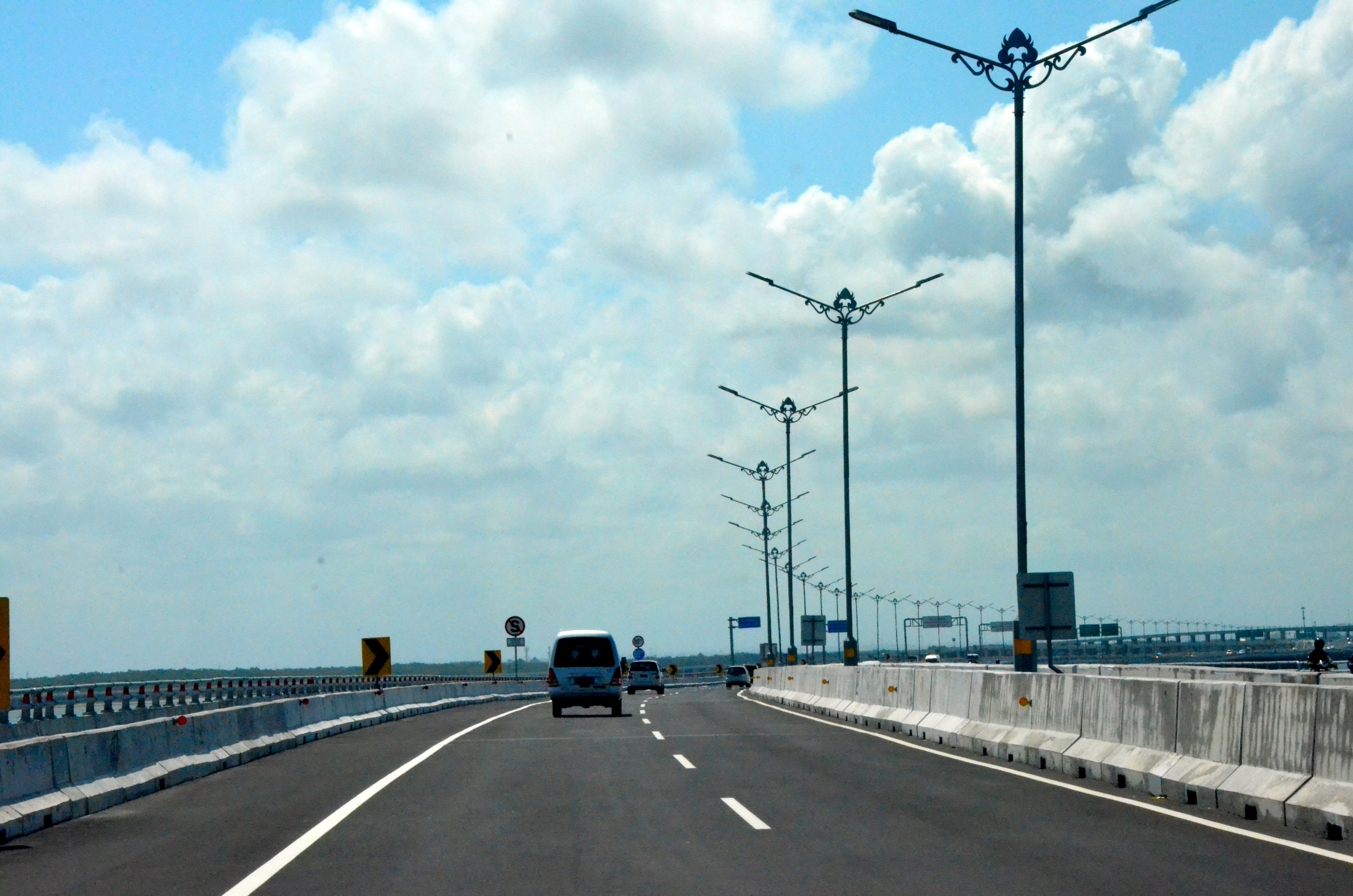
The Bali Mandara Toll Road, in Bali, Indonesia

In Indonesia all expressways (Indonesian: Jalan Bebas Hambatan, "obstacle-free road") are tolled, so they are better known as toll road (Jalan Tol). Indonesia has 1,710 km (1,060 mi) expressway length so far, almost 70% of its expressways are in Java island.

In 2009, the Indonesian government had planned to expand more expressway network in Java island by connecting Merak to Banyuwangi which is the total length of Trans-Java toll road including large cities expressway in Java such as Jakarta, Surabaya, Bandung and its complements is more than 1,000 km (620 mi). The Indonesian government also had planned to build the Trans-Sumatra toll road which connects Banda Aceh to Bakauheni spanning 2,700 km (1,700 mi). In 2012, the government allocated 150 trillion rupiah for the construction of the toll roads. There are three stages of construction of Trans-Sumatra toll road which is expected to be connected together in 2025.

The other islands in Indonesia such as Kalimantan, Sulawesi also has begun constructed its expressways including connecting Manado to Makassar in Sulawesi and also Pontianak to Balikpapan in Kalimantan. However, there are still no plans to build an expressway in Western New Guinea due to its slow population growth. Indonesia is expected to have at least 7,000 km (4,300 mi) of expressway in 2030.

==== Iran ====

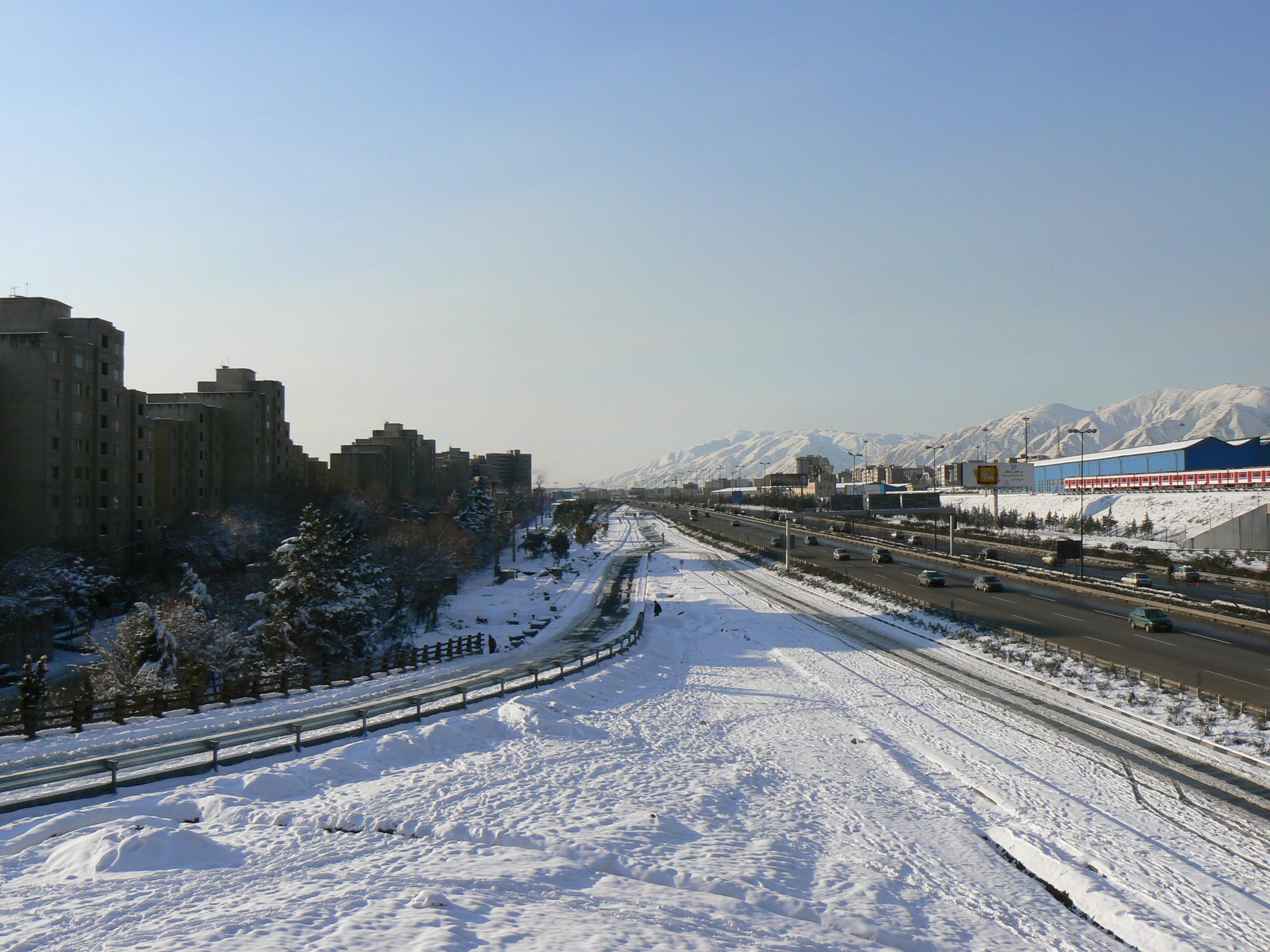
Tehran-Karaj highway

The history of freeways in Iran goes back to before the Iranian Revolution. The first freeway in Iran was built at that time, between Tehran and Karaj with additional construction and the studies of many other freeways started as well. Today Iran has about 2,160 km (1,340 mi) of freeway.

==== Iraq ====
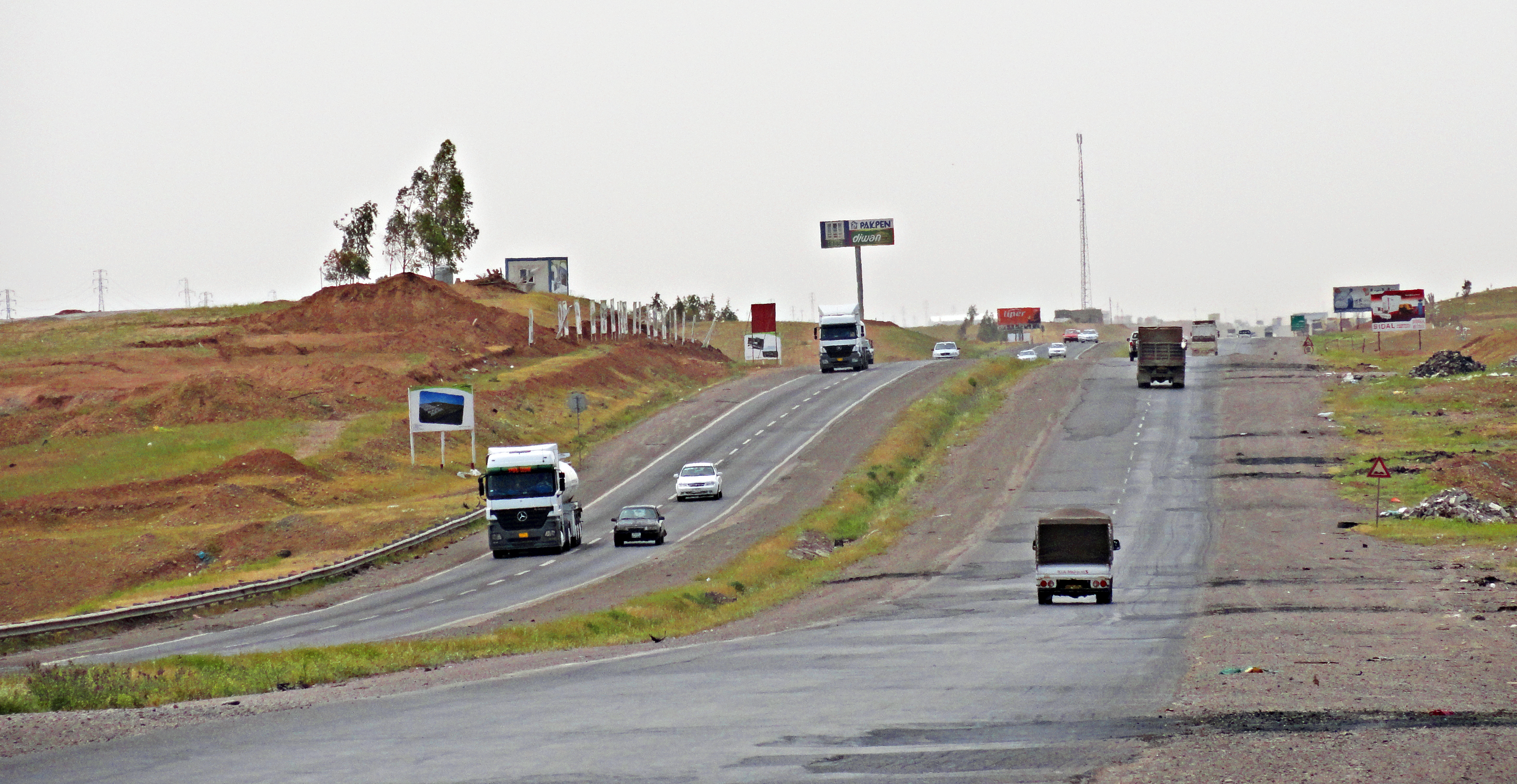
Highway between Erbil and Mosul

Iraq's network of highways connects it from the inside to adjacent countries such as Syria, Turkey, Kuwait, Saudi Arabia, Jordan and Iran. When Saddam Hussein visited the United States, he was impressed at the highway style and ordered the highways to be built in American form. Freeway 1 is the longest freeway in the country, connecting from Umm Qasr Port in Basra to Ar Rutba in Anbar, spreading to a new freeway connecting it to Syria and Jordan. Iraq has about 45,550 km (28,300 mi) of highways, with 38,400 km (23,900 mi) of them paved.

==== Israel ====

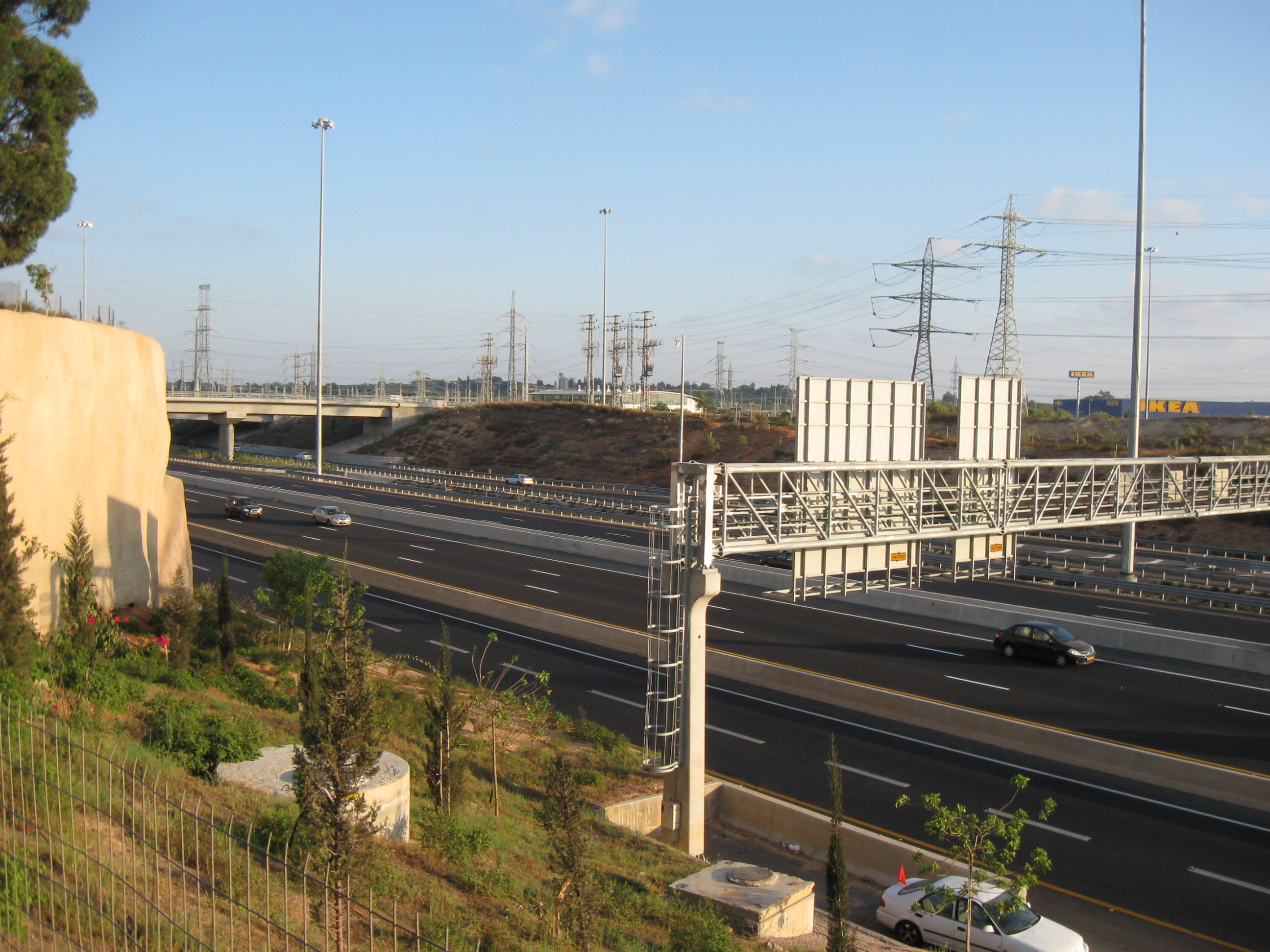
Highway 431 near Rishon LeZion

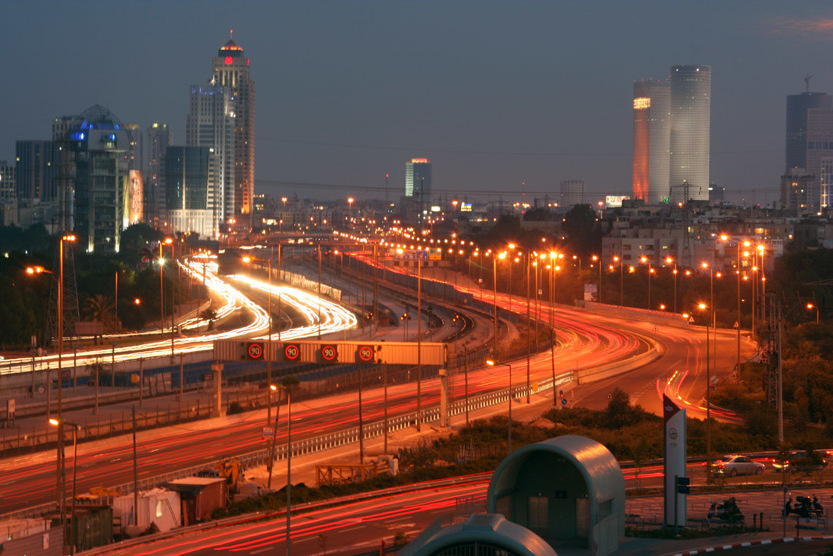
Ayalon Highway near Rokach Interchange

Controlled-access highways in Israel are designated by a blue colour. Blue highways are completely grade-separated but may include bus stops and other elements that may slow down traffic on the right lane. Highway 6 is Israel's longest freeway. It will extend to 260 km (160 mi) in length, from Shlomi in the north to the Negev Junction in the south.

==== Japan ====

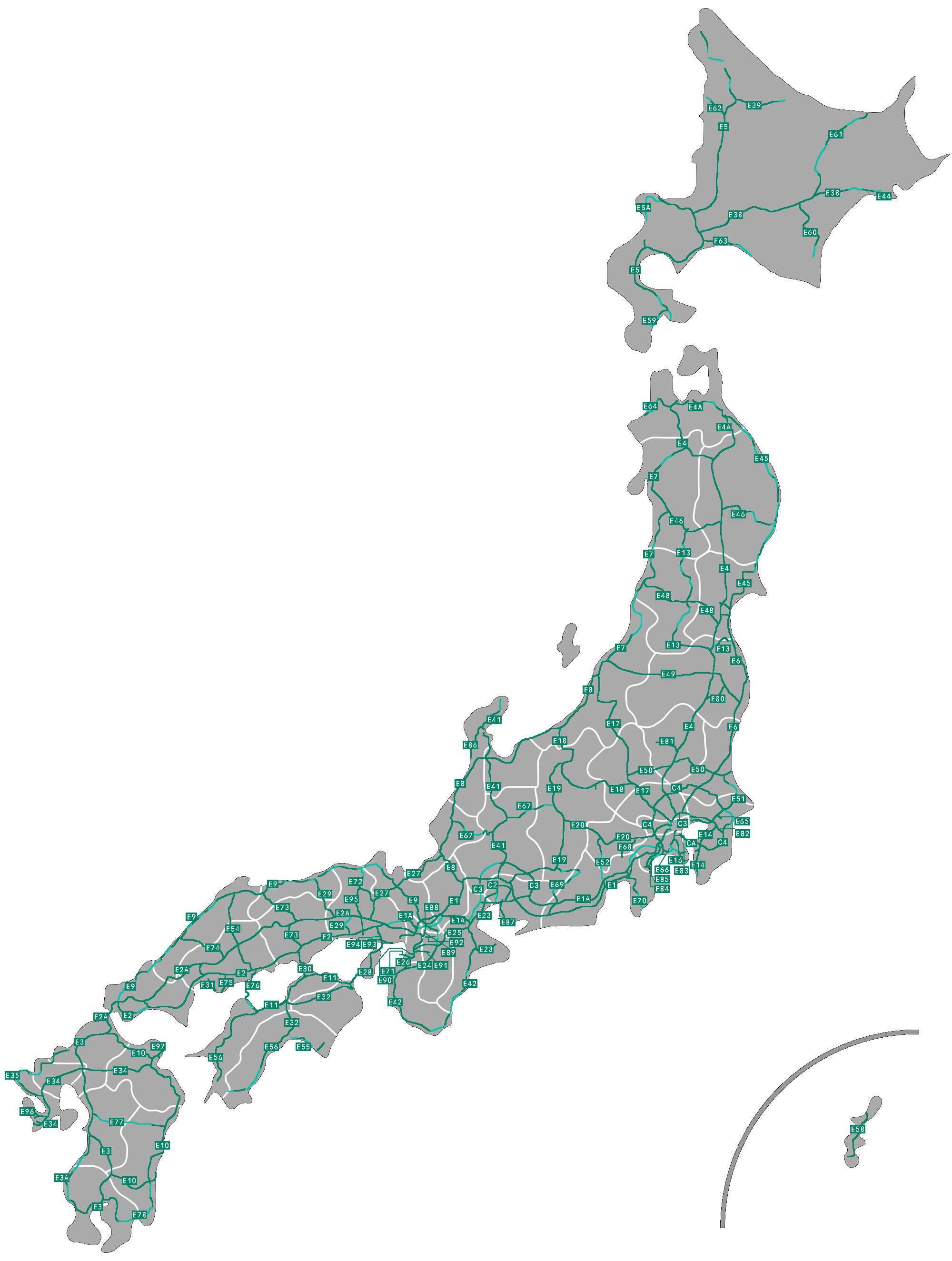
Map of Japanese expressways with numbering scheme

National expressways (高速自動車国道, Kōsoku Jidōsha Kokudō), generally known as 高速道路 (Kōsoku Dōro), make up the majority of controlled-access highways in Japan. The network boasts an uninterrupted link between Aomori Prefecture at the northern part of Honshū and Kagoshima Prefecture at the southern part of Kyūshū, linking Shikoku as well. Additional expressways serve travellers in Hokkaidō and on Okinawa Island, although those are not connected to the Honshū-Kyūshū-Shikoku grid. Expressways have a combined length of 9,429 km (5,859 mi) as of April 2018.

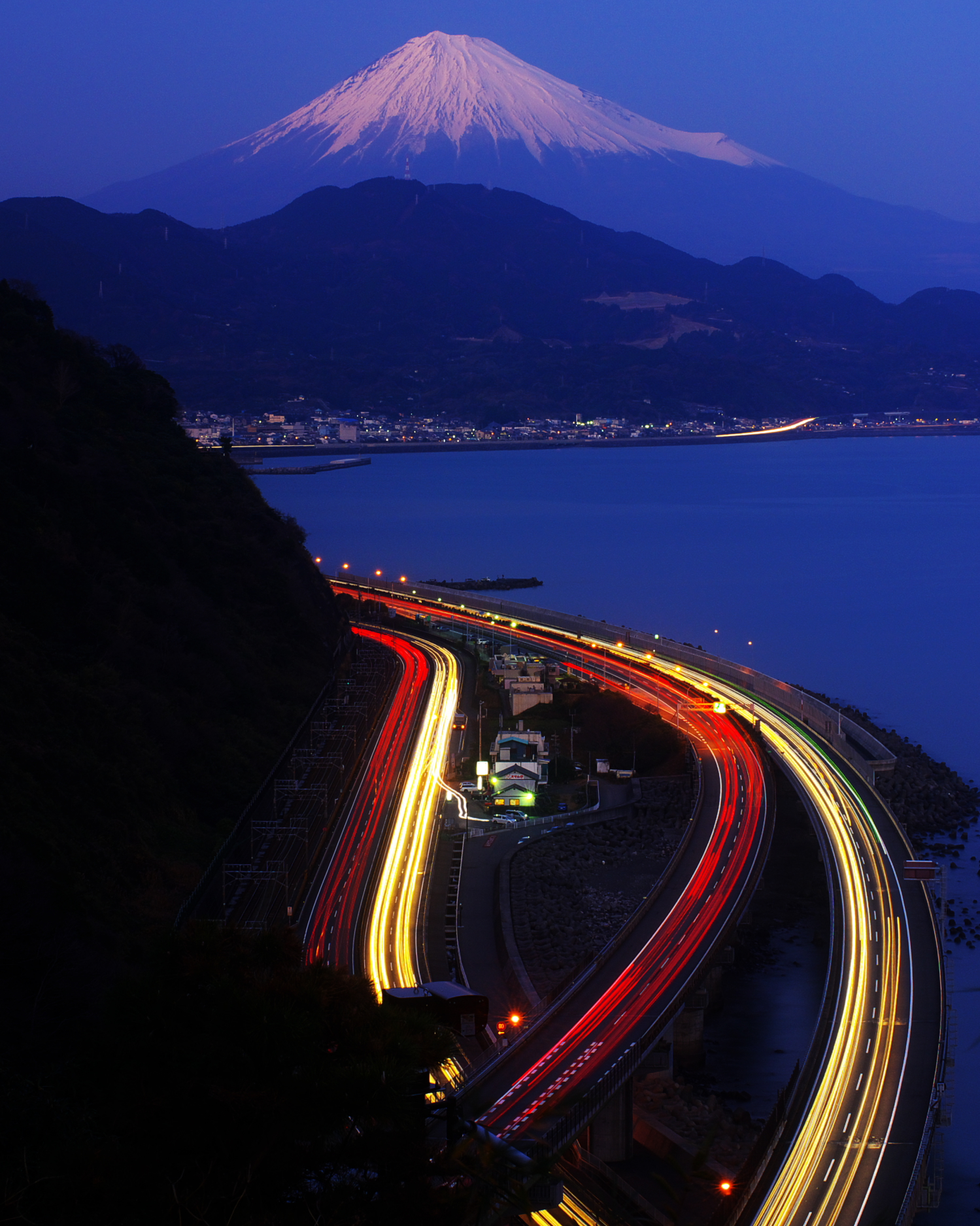
Many Japanese expressways go through the steep mountains.

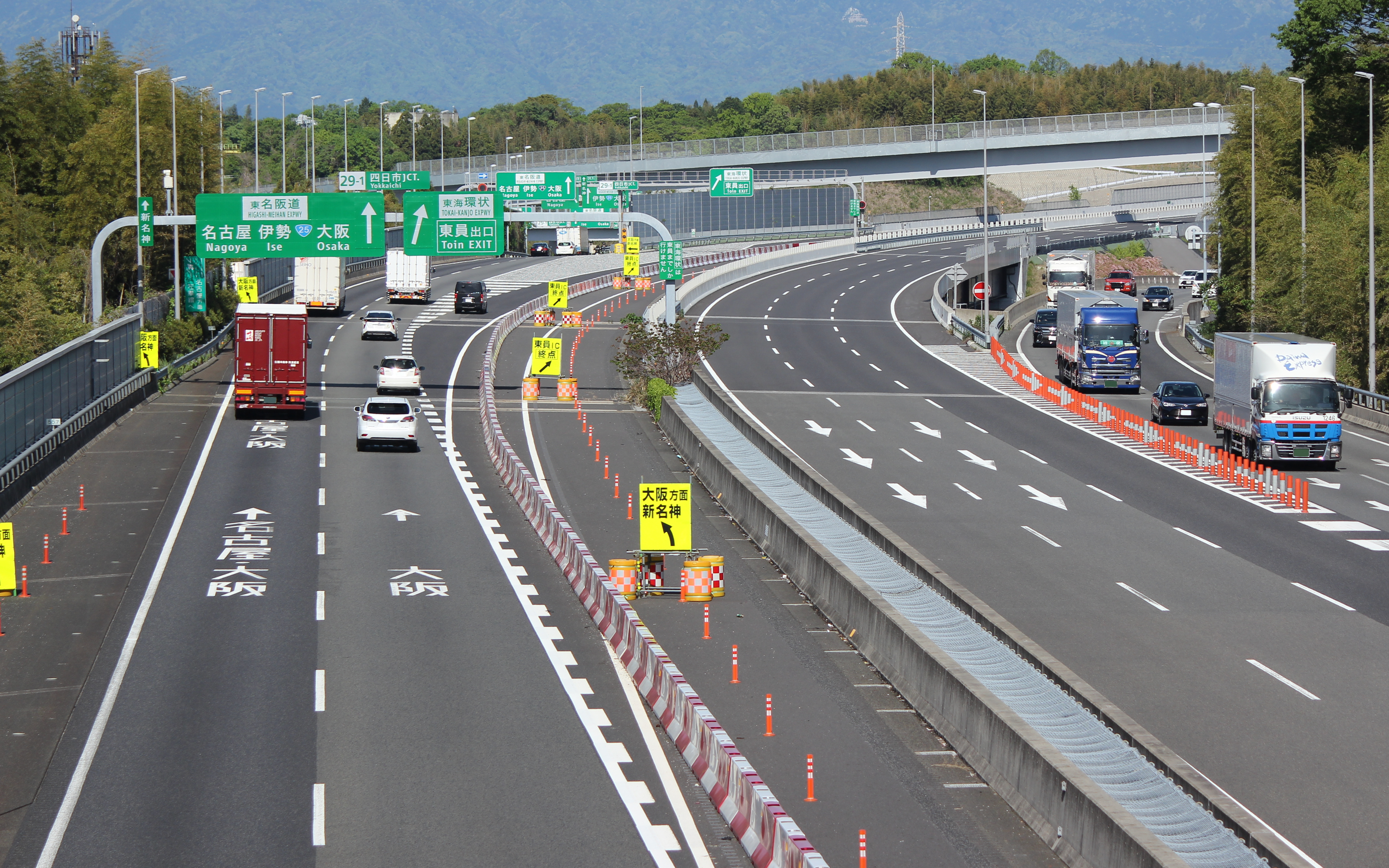
A group of green-coloured directional signs on a Japanese expressway

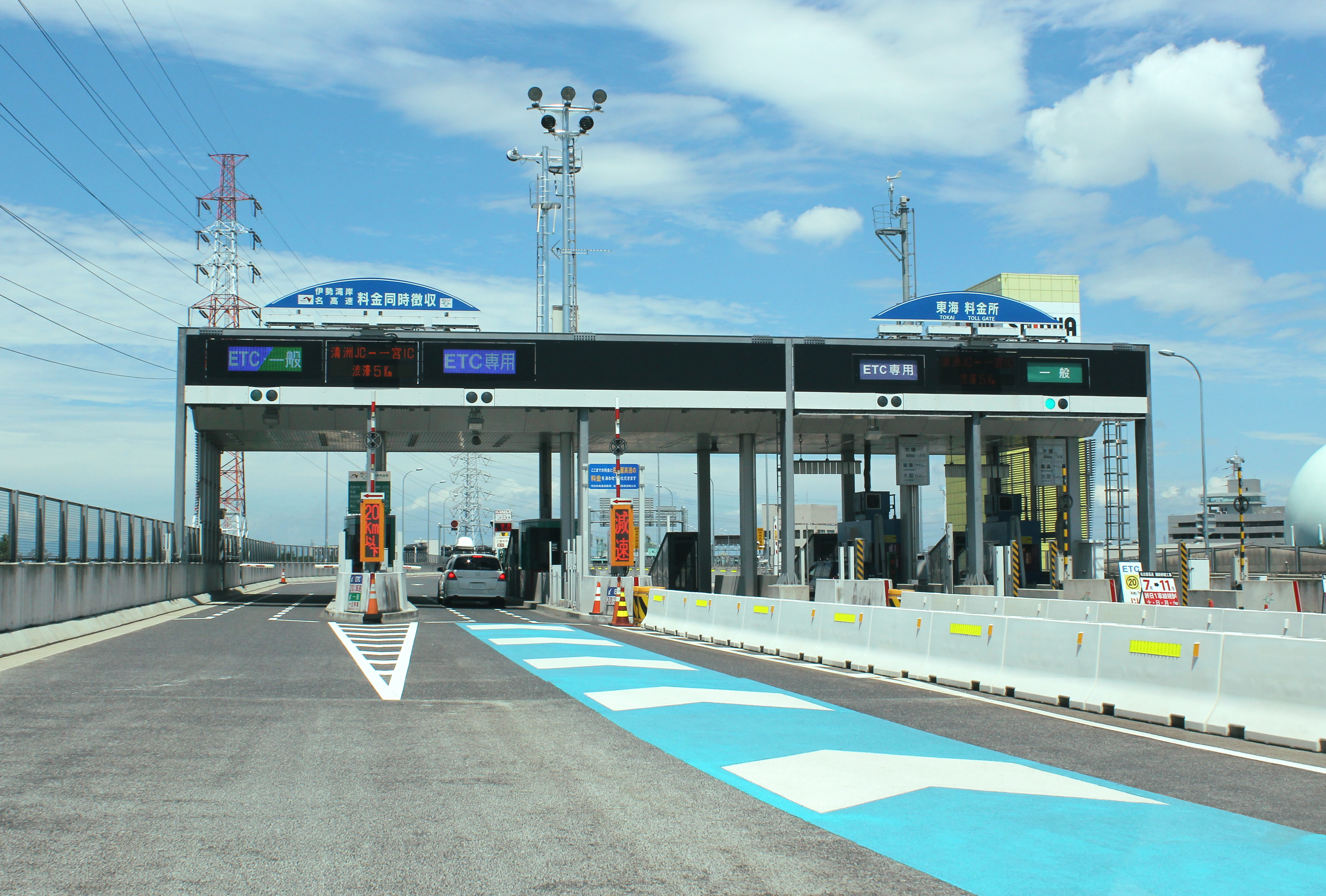
Toll gates are placed at most of the entrances and exits of Japanese expressways.

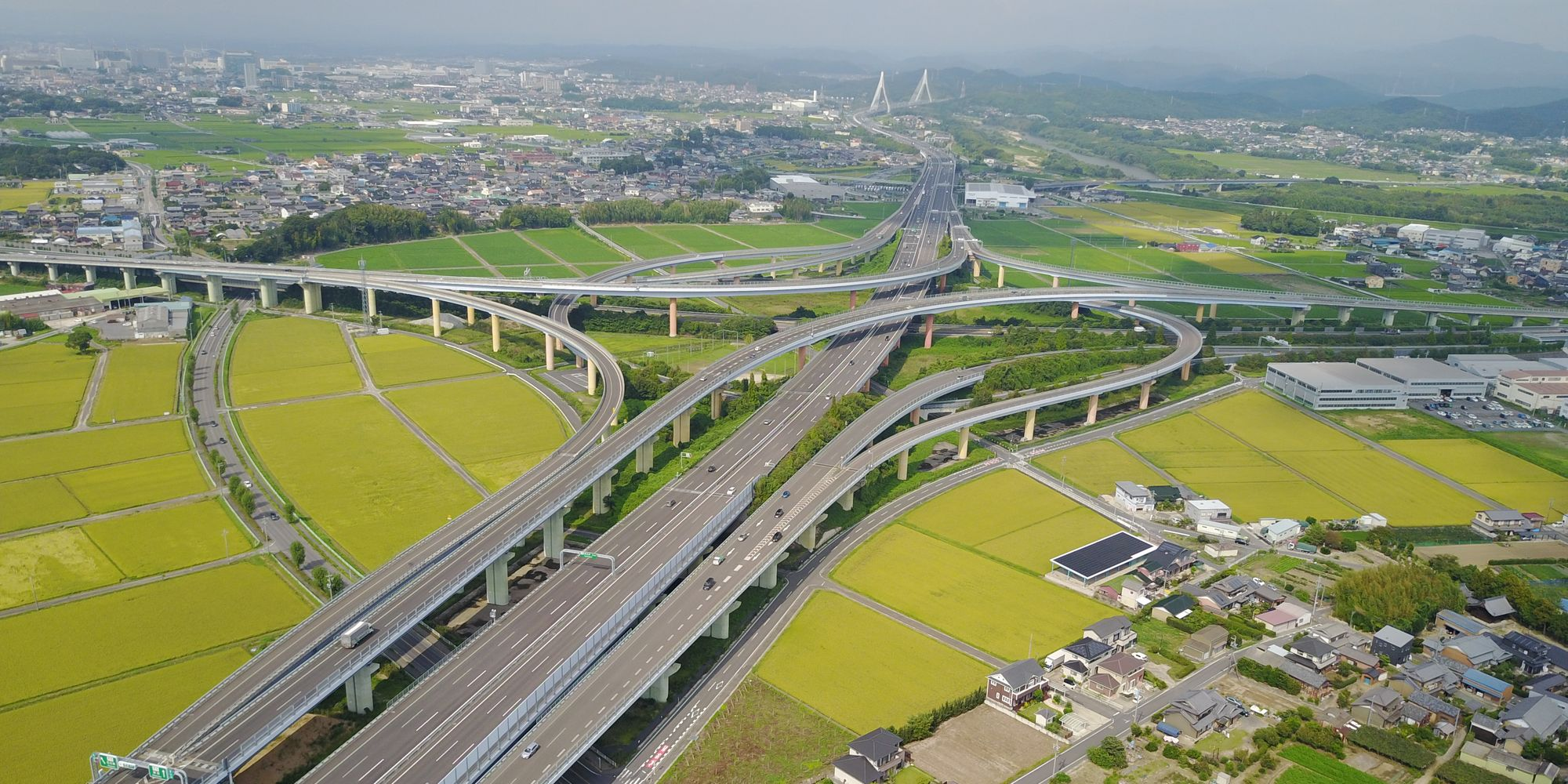
Aerial view of Toyota Junction, connecting Tomei Expressway and Ise-Wangan Expressway

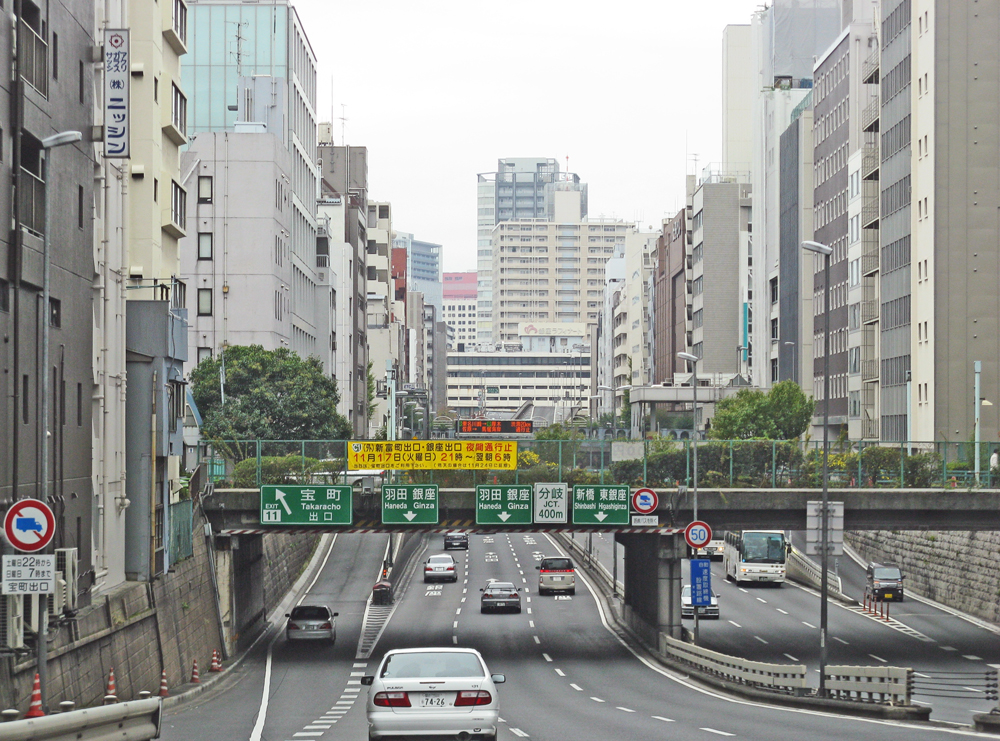
The Shutoko C1 route forms a loop of the center of Tokyo.

==== Lebanon ====
Lebanon has an extensive network of highways that are in varying condition throughout the country. Many highways are part of the Arab Mashreq International Road Network. Some highways have been upgraded to four-lane motorways, including the Beirut–Tripoli highway.

==== Malaysia ====

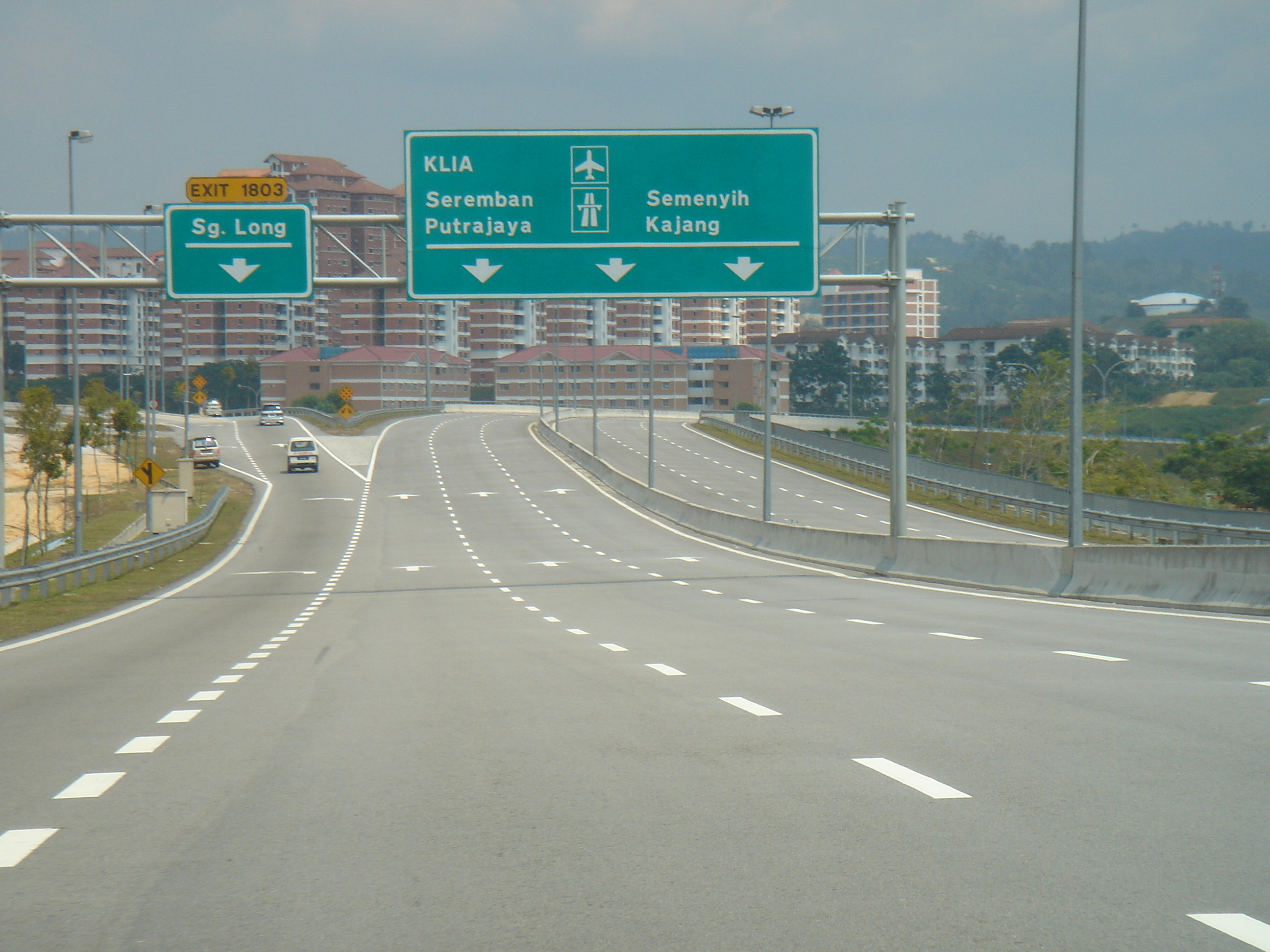
Sungai Long exit, Kajang Dispersal Link Expressway, Selangor Malaysia

Controlled-access highways in Malaysia are known as expressways (Malay: lebuhraya – this is also the name for highways). However, some expressways, particularly bridges and tunnels such as the Penang Bridge, do not formally use the expressway name; a small number confusingly use the term highway, which is normally the designation for limited-access roads. Route numbers of designated expressways begin with the letter E. All expressways (excluding a section of the South Klang Valley Expressway, which is a two-lane expressway) are built with dual carriageways and at least two lanes in each direction; urban expressways generally have three or more lanes in each direction.

While all expressways are grade separated at major roadways, many urban expressways in the Greater Kuala Lumpur region often have at-grade intersections, including with residential roads and shopfronts, thus do not meet the strict definition of a controlled-access highway. These expressways were previously normal arterial or collector roads that had such intersections, and were not removed when the roads were converted to expressways due to the resulting accessibility and sometimes political issues. Despite this, no expressway allows traffic to cross the median strip (apart from U-turns on a limited number of expressways) and expressways do not have at-grade traffic signals or roundabouts. Expressways have a maximum speed limit of 110 km/h (68 mph), while speed limits of 90 km/h (56 mph) or lower are typical in built-up areas.

As of 2017, expressways have only been designated in Peninsular Malaysia. There are 34 fully or partially open expressways with an approximate total length of 1,821 km (1,132 mi). The vast majority of expressways are tolled; the North–South Expressway network, East Coast Expressway and West Coast Expressway predominantly use the ticket system of toll collection, while all other expressways use the barrier system. The construction and operation of expressways in Malaysia are usually privatized via concession agreements with the federal government, using the build–operate–transfer system.

==== Pakistan ====
Symbol used for motorways in Pakistan

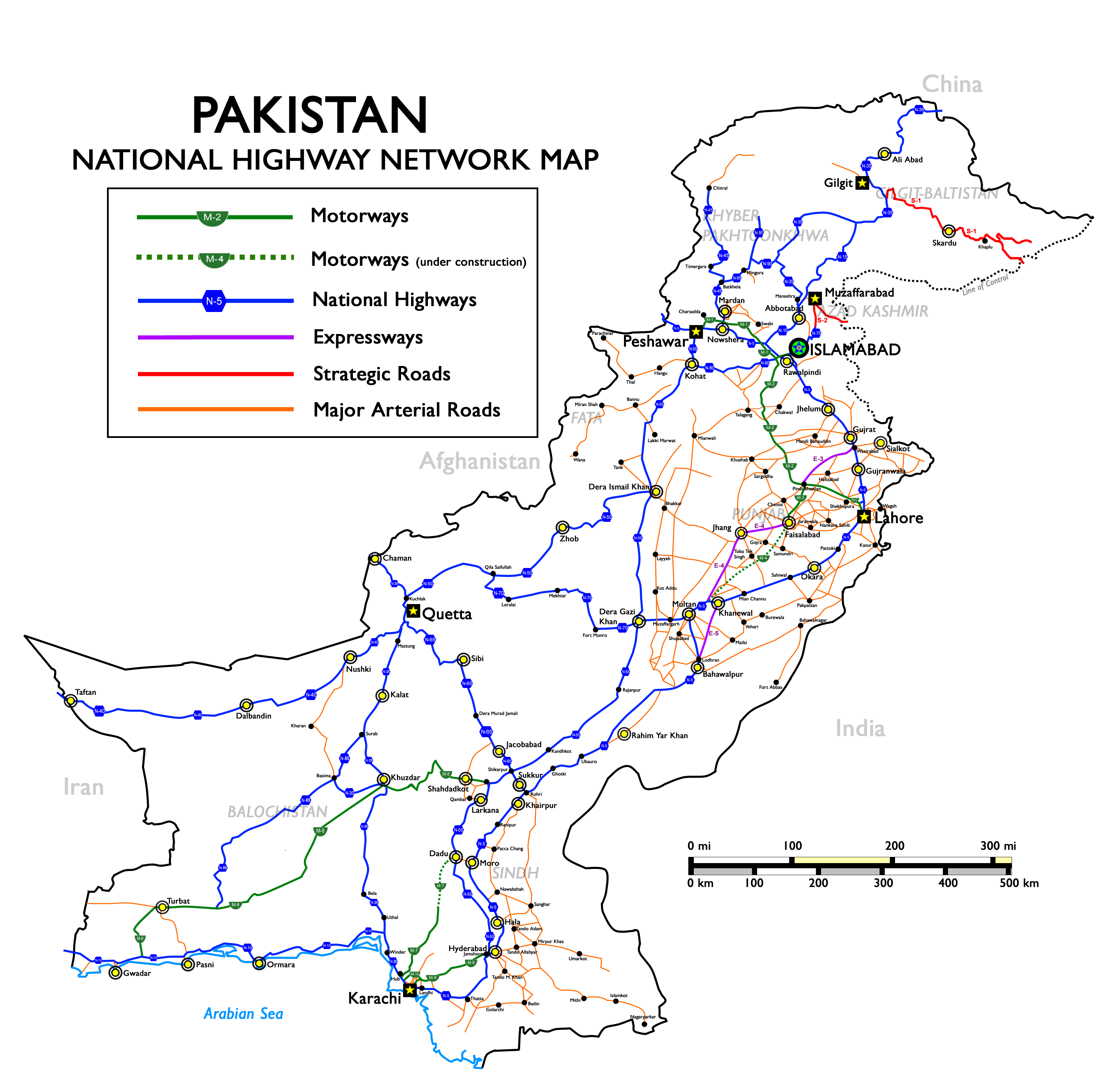
National highways of Pakistan, showing motorways and expressways

The motorways of Pakistan and expressways of Pakistan are a network of multiple-lane, high-speed, limited-access or controlled-access highways in Pakistan, which are owned, maintained and operated federally by Pakistan's National Highway Authority. The total length of Pakistan's motorways and expressways is 1,670 km (1,040 mi) as of November 2016. Around 3,690 km (2,290 mi) of motorways are currently under construction in different parts of the country. Most of these motorway projects will be complete between 2018 and 2020.

Pakistan's motorways are part of Pakistan's National Trade Corridor project that aims to link Pakistan's three Arabian Sea ports of Karachi, Port Qasim and Gwadar to the rest of the country. These would further link with Central Asia and China, as proposed in the China Pakistan Economic Corridor.

Pakistan's first motorway, the M-2, was inaugurated in November 1997; it is a 367-kilometre-long (228 mi), six-lane motorway that links Pakistan's federal capital, Islamabad, with Punjab's provincial capital, Lahore. It is ranked among the world's top five speed highways/motorways. Other completed motorways and expressways are M1 Peshawar–Islamabad Motorway, M4 PindiBhattian–Faisalabad-Multan Motorway, E75 Islamabad-Murree–Kashmir Expressway, M3 Lahore–Multan Motorway, M8 Ratadero–Gawader Motorway, E8 Islamabad Expressway, M5 Multan-Sukkur Motorway, M9 Karachi-Hyderabad, Sindh and few others.

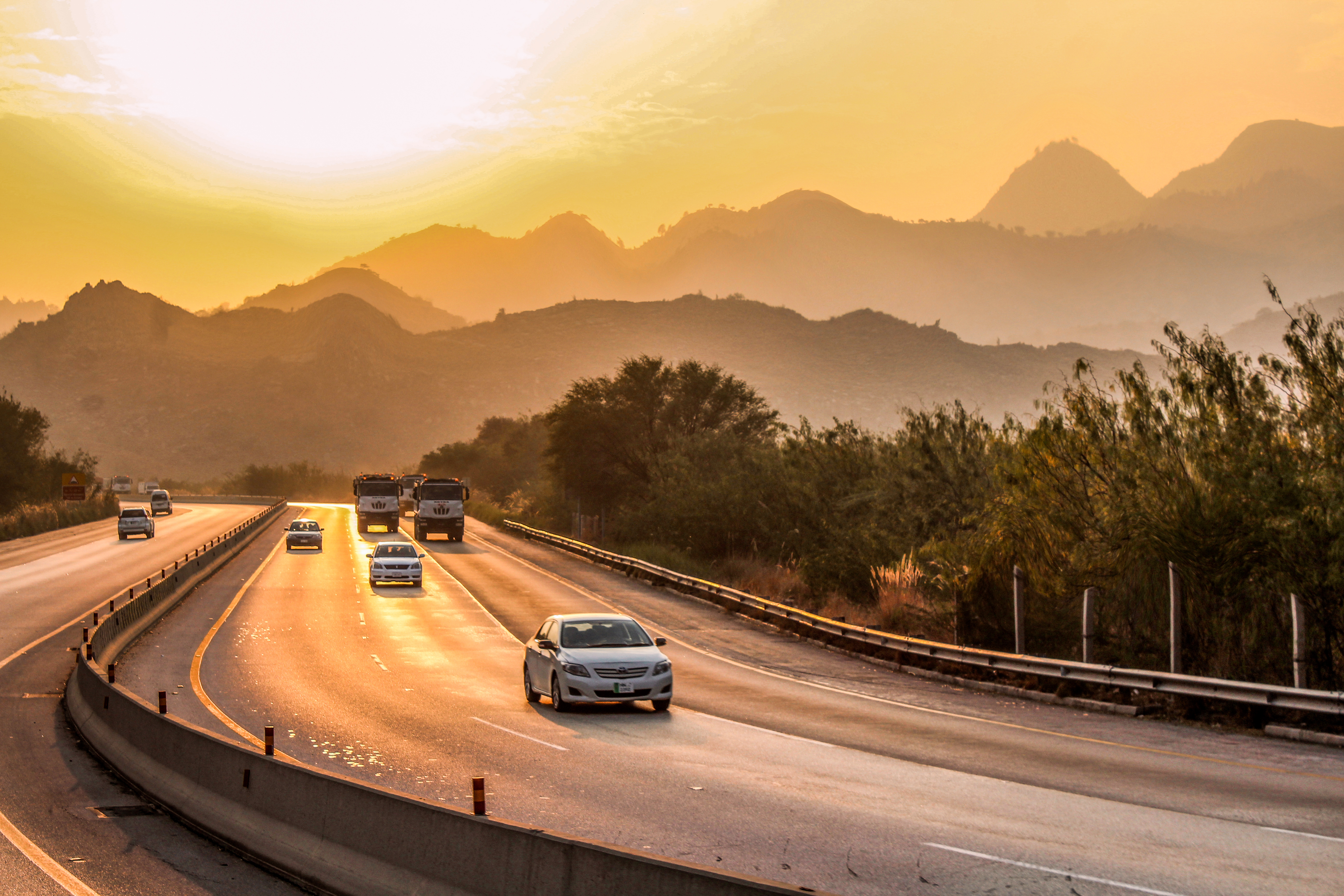
The motorway M-2 passes through the Salt Range mountains.

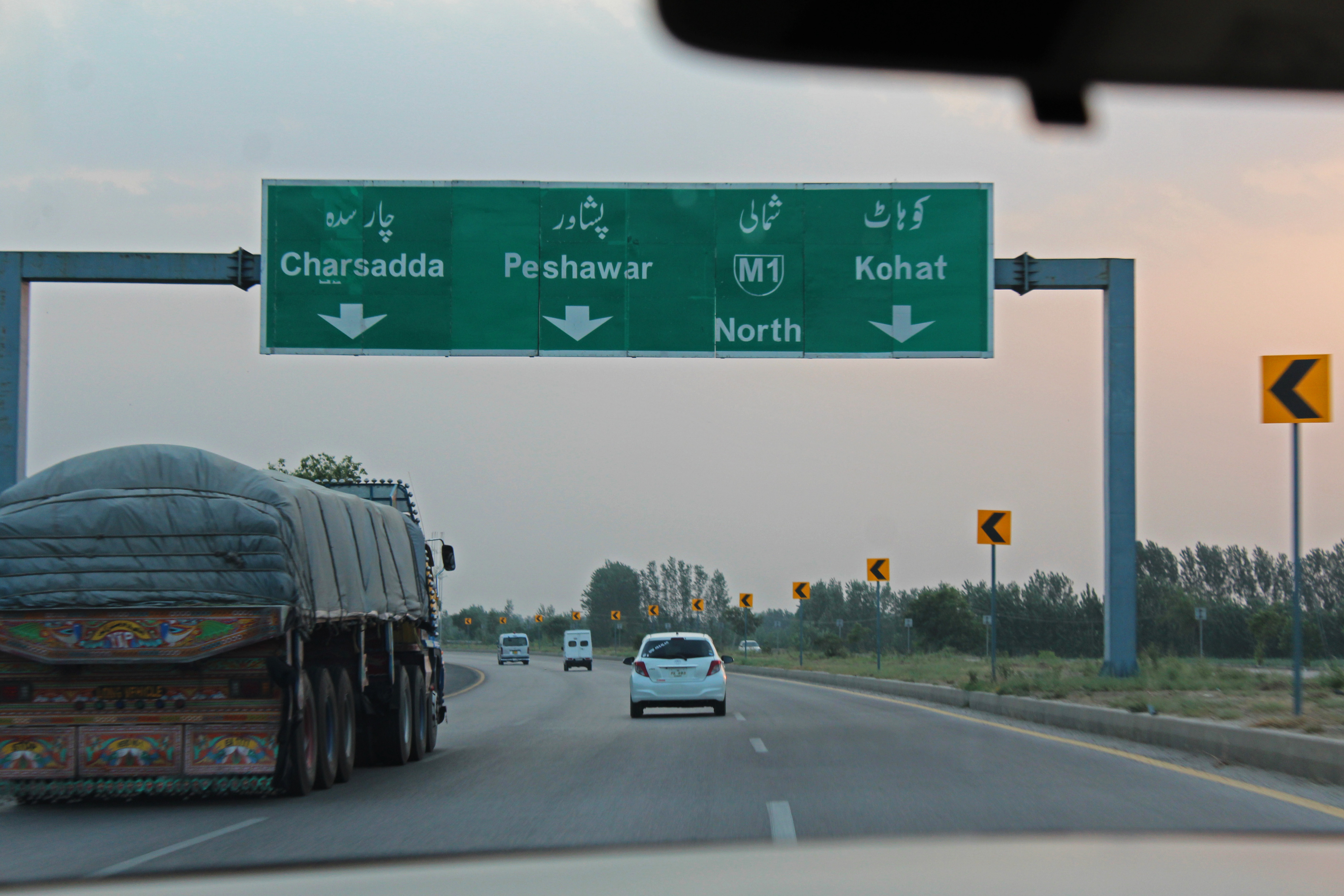
M-1 motorway westbound towards Peshawar

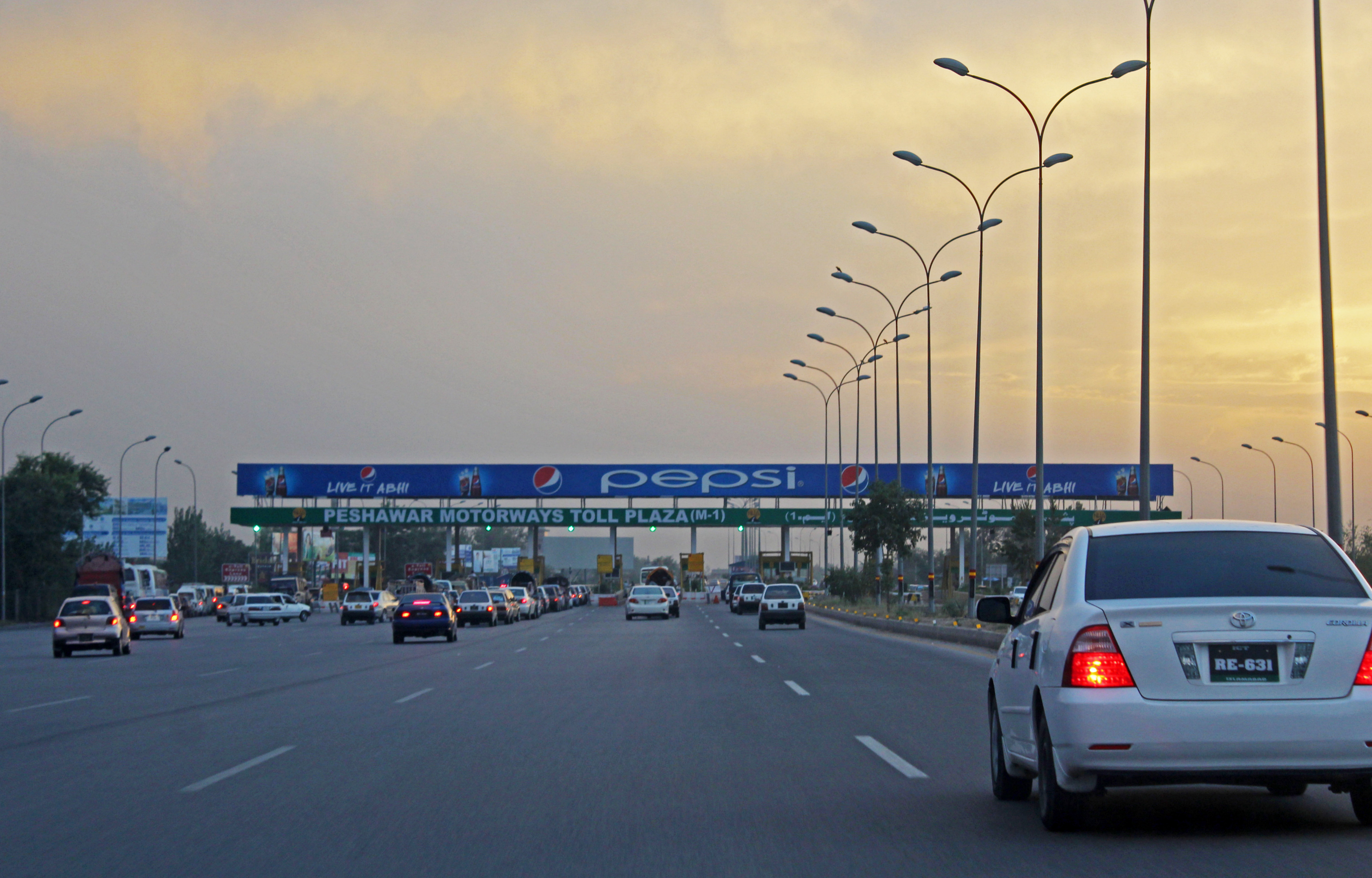
M-1 Peshawar Toll Plaza

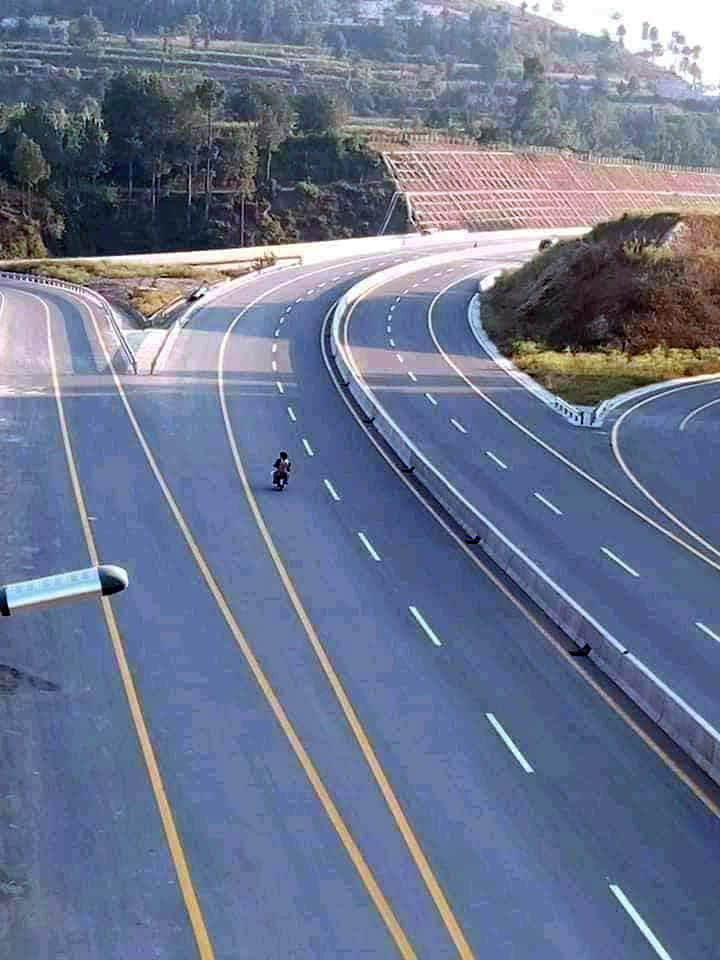
M-15 at Mansehra

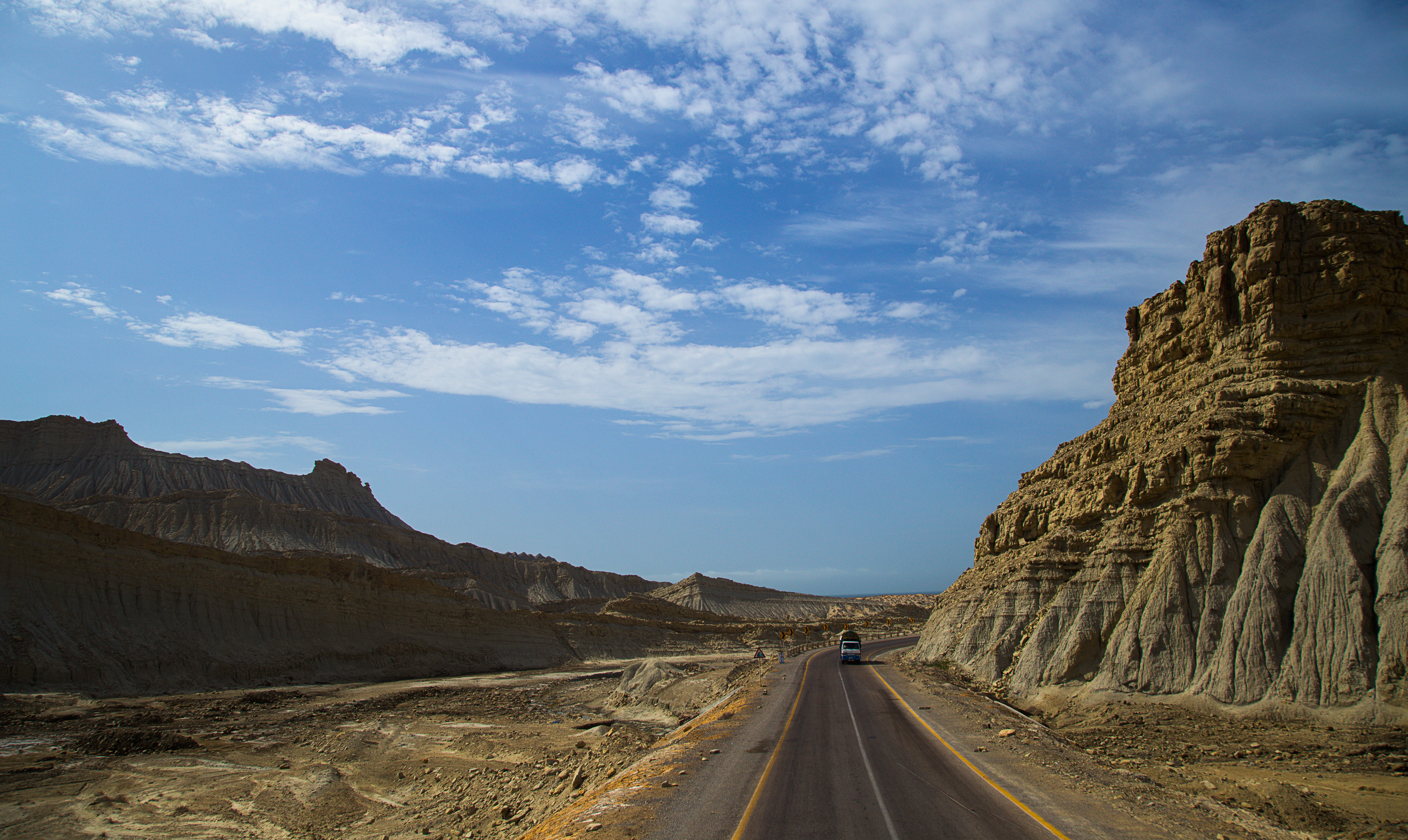
The Makran Coastal Highway (N10) passing through Balochistan

==== Philippines ====

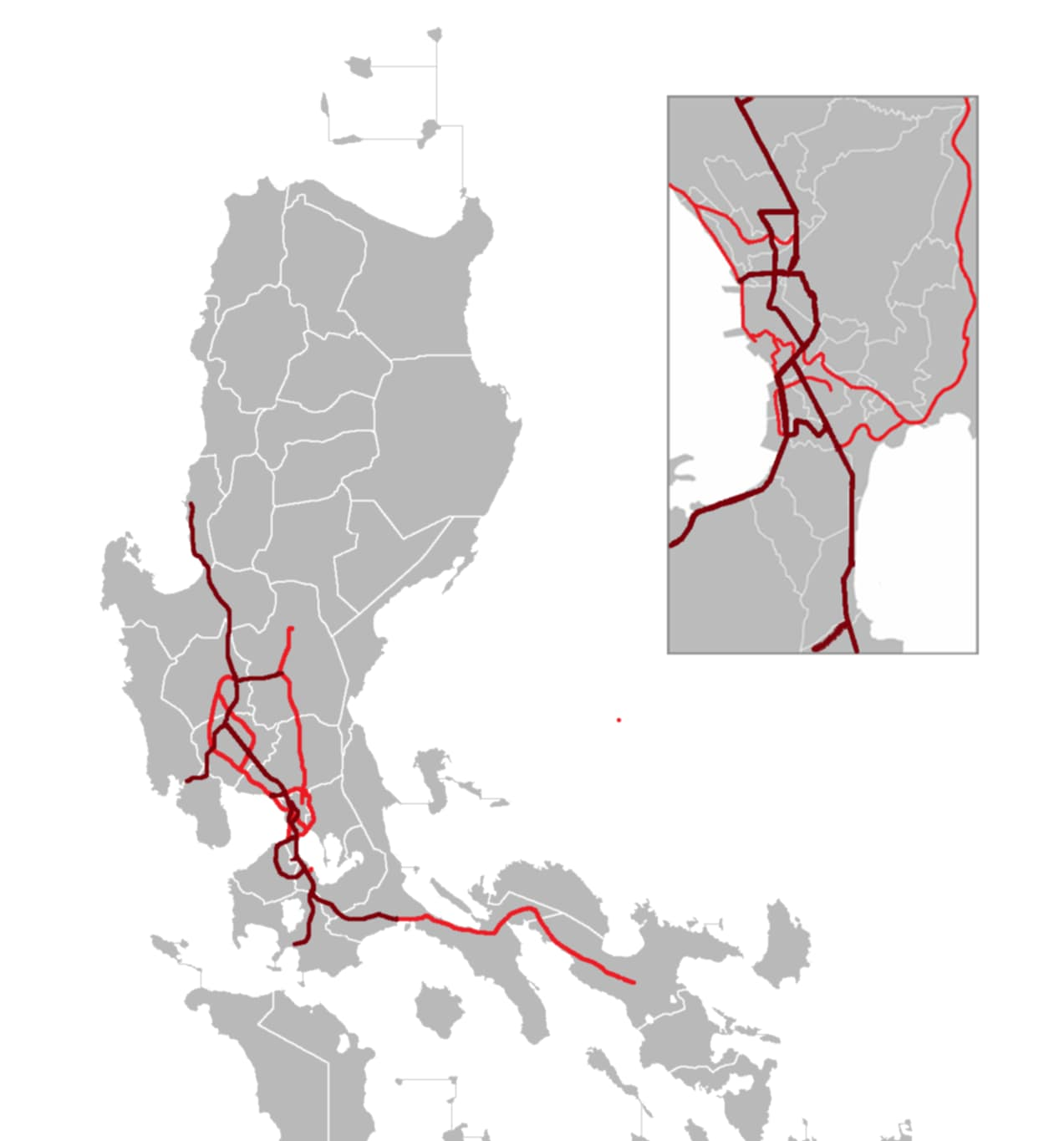
Map of expressways in Luzon, maroon for built expressways and expressways under construction, red for proposed expressways

Full control-access highways in the Philippines are referred to as expressways, which are usually toll roads. The expressway network is concentrated in Luzon, with the North Luzon Expressway and South Luzon Expressway being the most important ones. The expressway network in Luzon do not form an integrated network, but there are ongoing construction projects to interconnect those highways as well as to decongest the existing roads in the areas they serve. Expressways are being introduced to Visayas and Mindanao through the construction of the Cebu–Cordova Link Expressway in Metro Cebu and Davao City Expressway in Davao City.

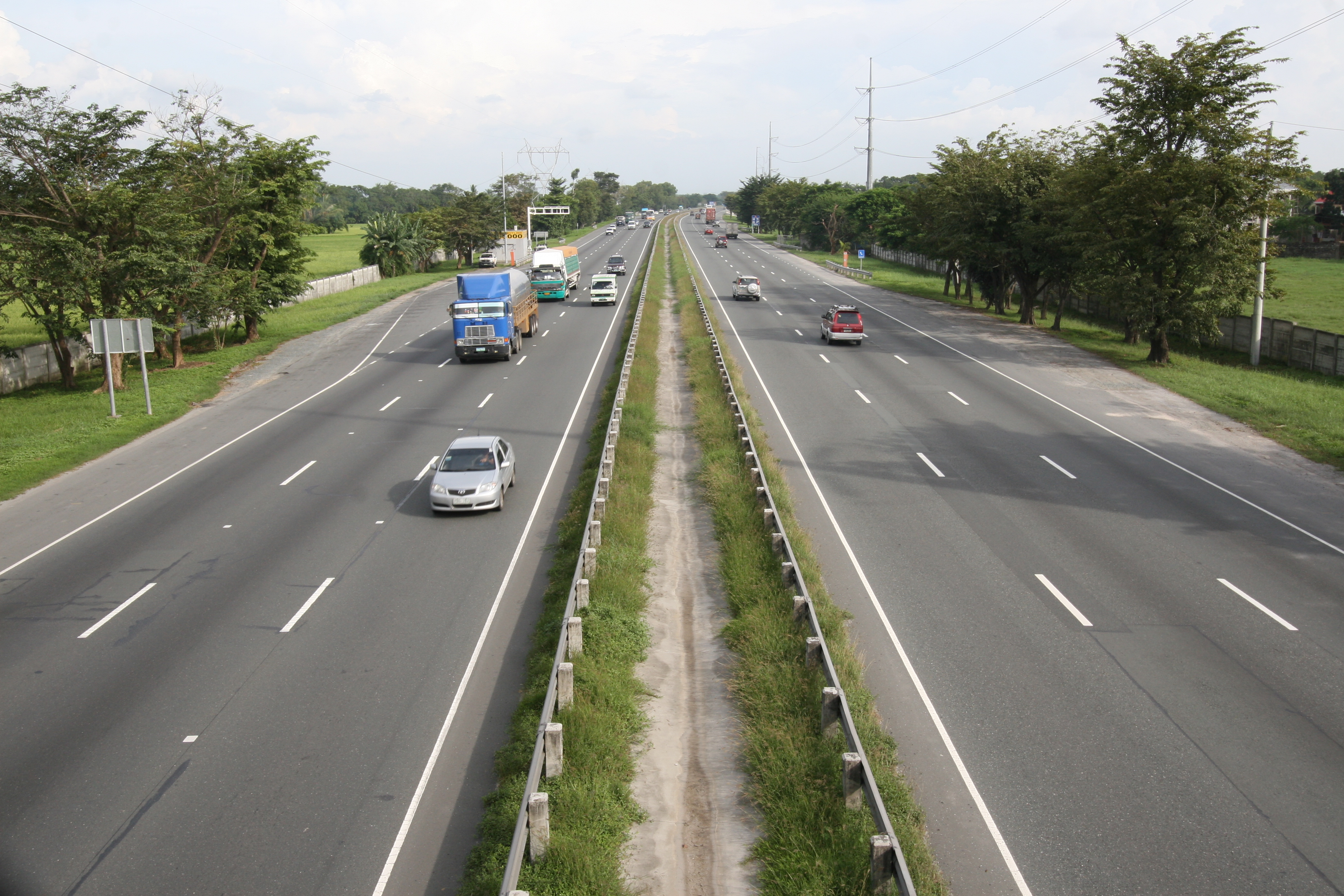
A portion of North Luzon Expressway in Guiguinto, Bulacan

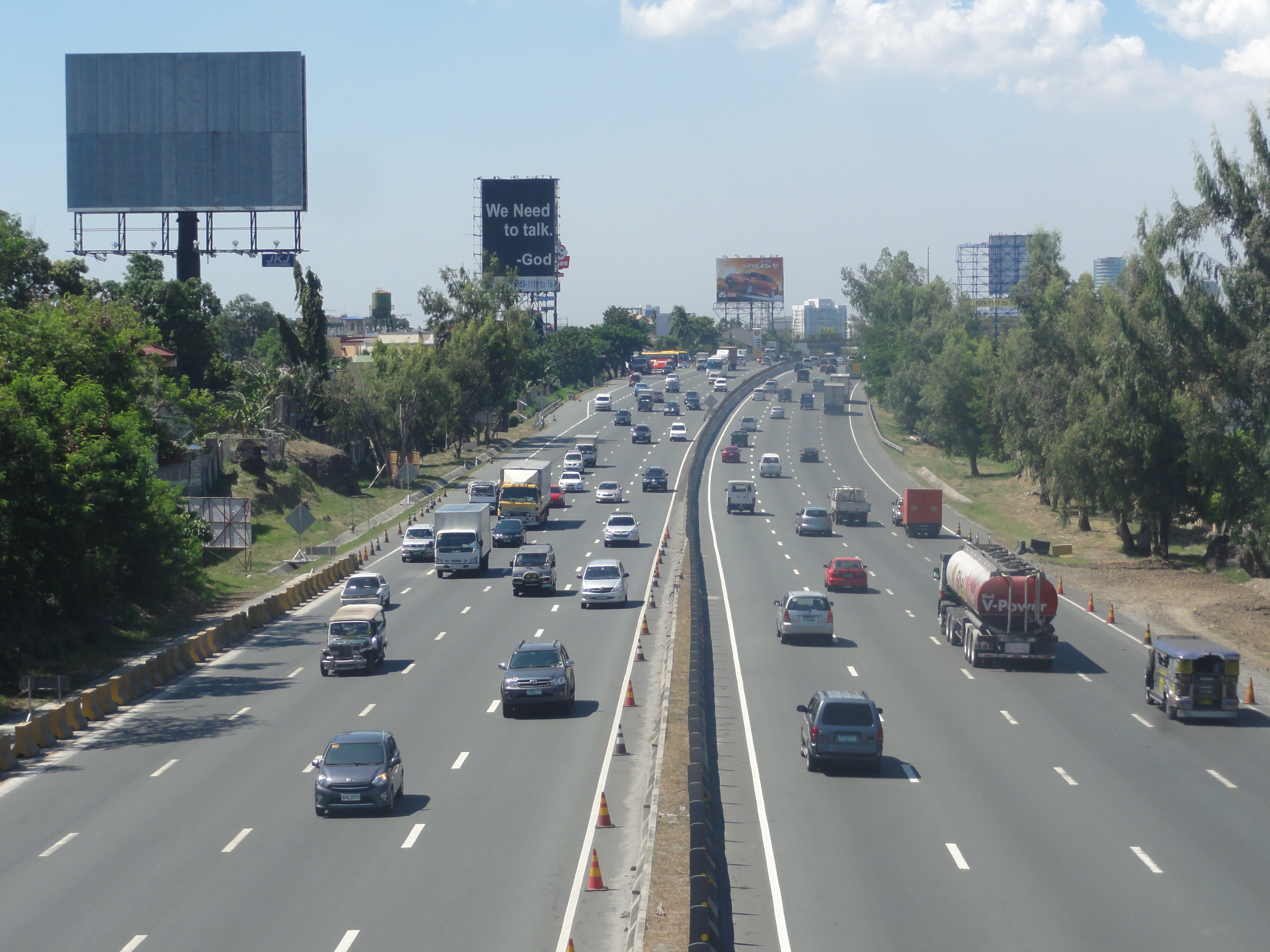
South Luzon Expressway

==== Saudi Arabia ====

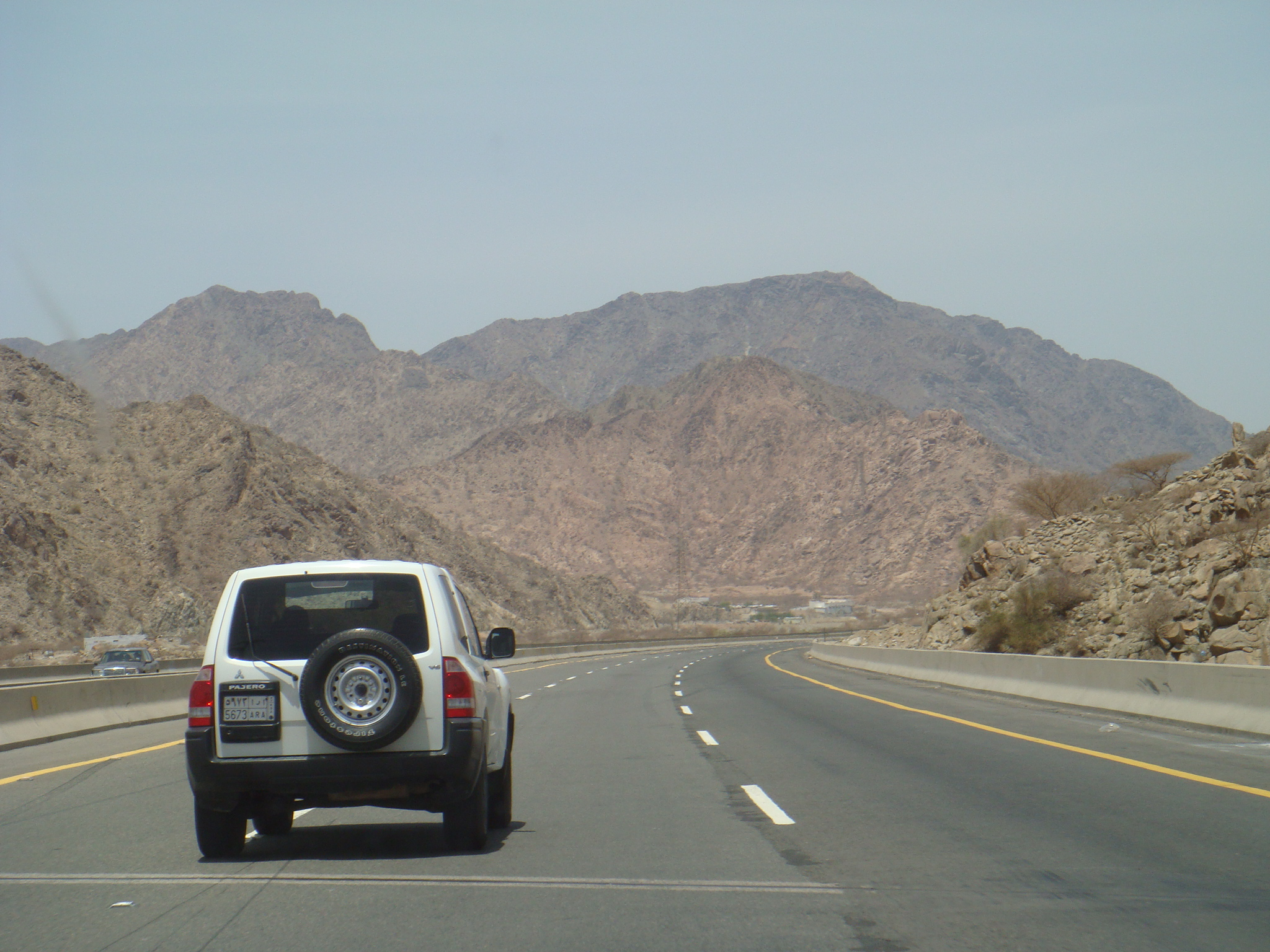
Highway 60 passing through the Hijaz Mountains

Highways in Saudi Arabia vary from eight-laned roads to small two-lane roads in rural areas. The city highways and other major highways are well maintained, especially the roads in the capital Riyadh. The roads have been constructed to resist the consistently high temperatures and do not reflect the strong sunshine. The other city highways such as the one linking coast to coast are not as great as the inner-city highways but the government is now working on rebuilding those roads. Saudi Arabia is part of the Arab-Mashreq Highway Network and connects to the rest of Asia through the Asian Highway Network.

==== Singapore ====

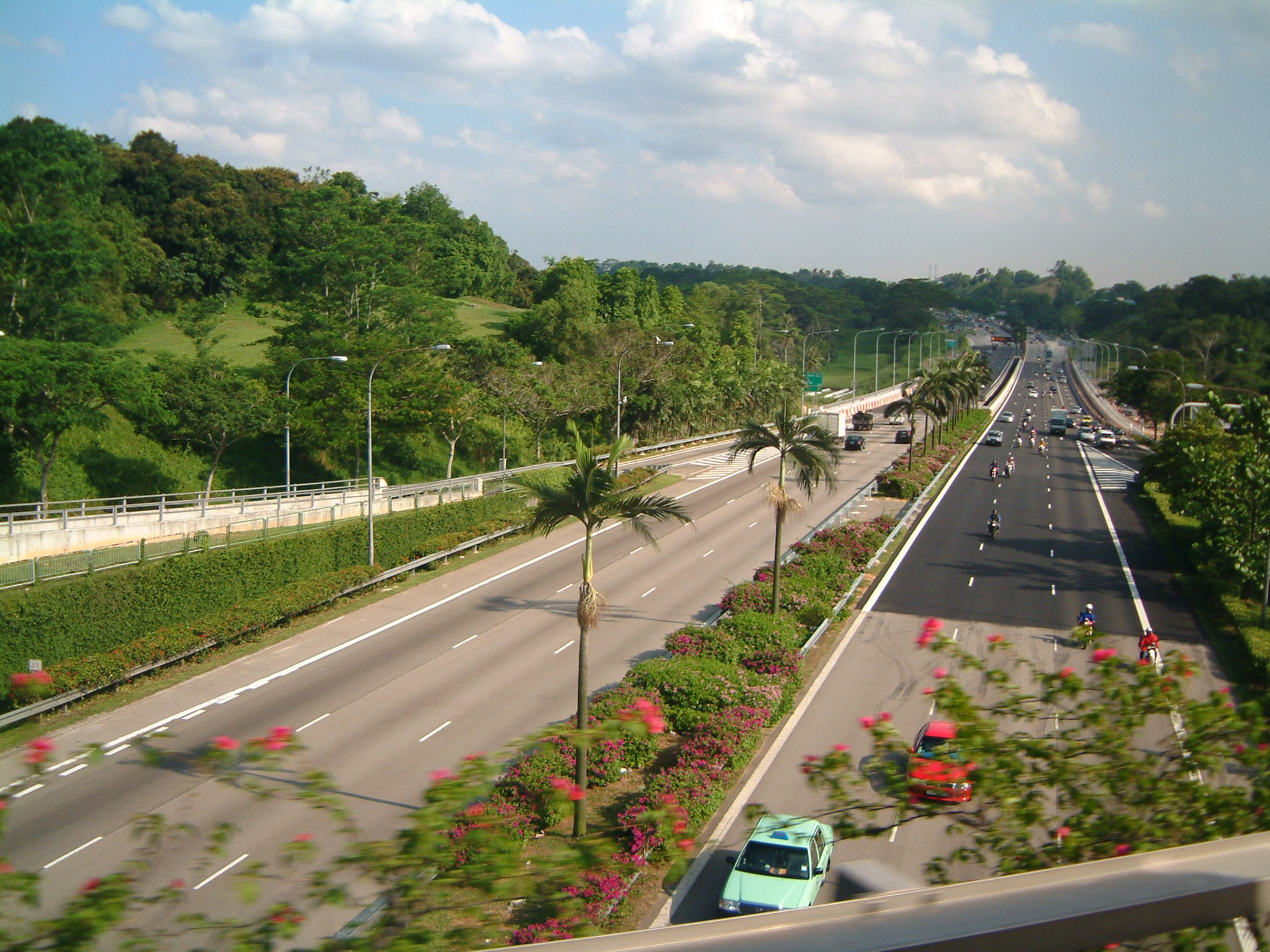
The Bukit Timah Expressway in Singapore

The expressways of Singapore are special roads that allow motorists to travel quickly from one urban area to another. All of them are dual carriageways with grade-separated access. They usually have three to four lanes in each direction, although there are two-lane carriageways at many expressway—expressway intersections and five-lane carriageways in some places. There are ten expressways, including the new Marina Coastal Expressway. Studies about the feasibility of additional expressways are ongoing.

Construction on the first expressway, the Pan Island Expressway, started in 1966. As of 2014, there are 163 km (101 mi) of expressways in Singapore.

The Singaporean expressway networks are connected with Malaysian expressway networks via Ayer Rajah Expressway (connects with the Second Link Expressway via the Malaysia–Singapore Second Link) and Bukit Timah Expressway (connects with the Eastern Dispersal Link via the Johor–Singapore Causeway).

==== South Korea ====

Expressways in South Korea

Since Gyeongin Expressway linking Seoul and Incheon opened in 1968, national expressway system in South Korea has been expanded into 36 routes, with total length of 4,481 km (2,784 mi) as of 2017. Most of expressways are four-lane roads, while 1,030 km (640 mi) (26%) have six to ten lanes. Speed limit is typically 100 km/h (62 mph) for routes with four or more lanes, while some sections having fewer curves have limit of 110 km/h (68 mph).

Expressways in South Korea were originally numbered in order of construction. Since 24 August 2001, they have been numbered in a scheme somewhat similar to that of the Interstate Highway System in the United States. Furthermore, the symbols of the South Korean highways are similar to the US red, white and blue.

- Arterial routes are designated by two-digit numbers, with north–south routes having odd numbers, and east–west routes having even numbers. Primary routes (i.e. major thoroughfares) have 5 or 0 as their last digit, while secondary routes end in other digits.
- Branch routes have three-digit route numbers, where the first two digits match the route number of an arterial route. This differs from the American system, whose last two digits match the primary route.
- Belt lines have three-digit route numbers where the first digit matches the respective city's postal code. This also differs from American numbering.
- Route numbers in the range 70–99 are not used in South Korea; they are reserved for designations in the event of Korean reunification.
- The Gyeongbu Expressway kept its Route 1 designation, as it is South Korea's first and most important expressway.
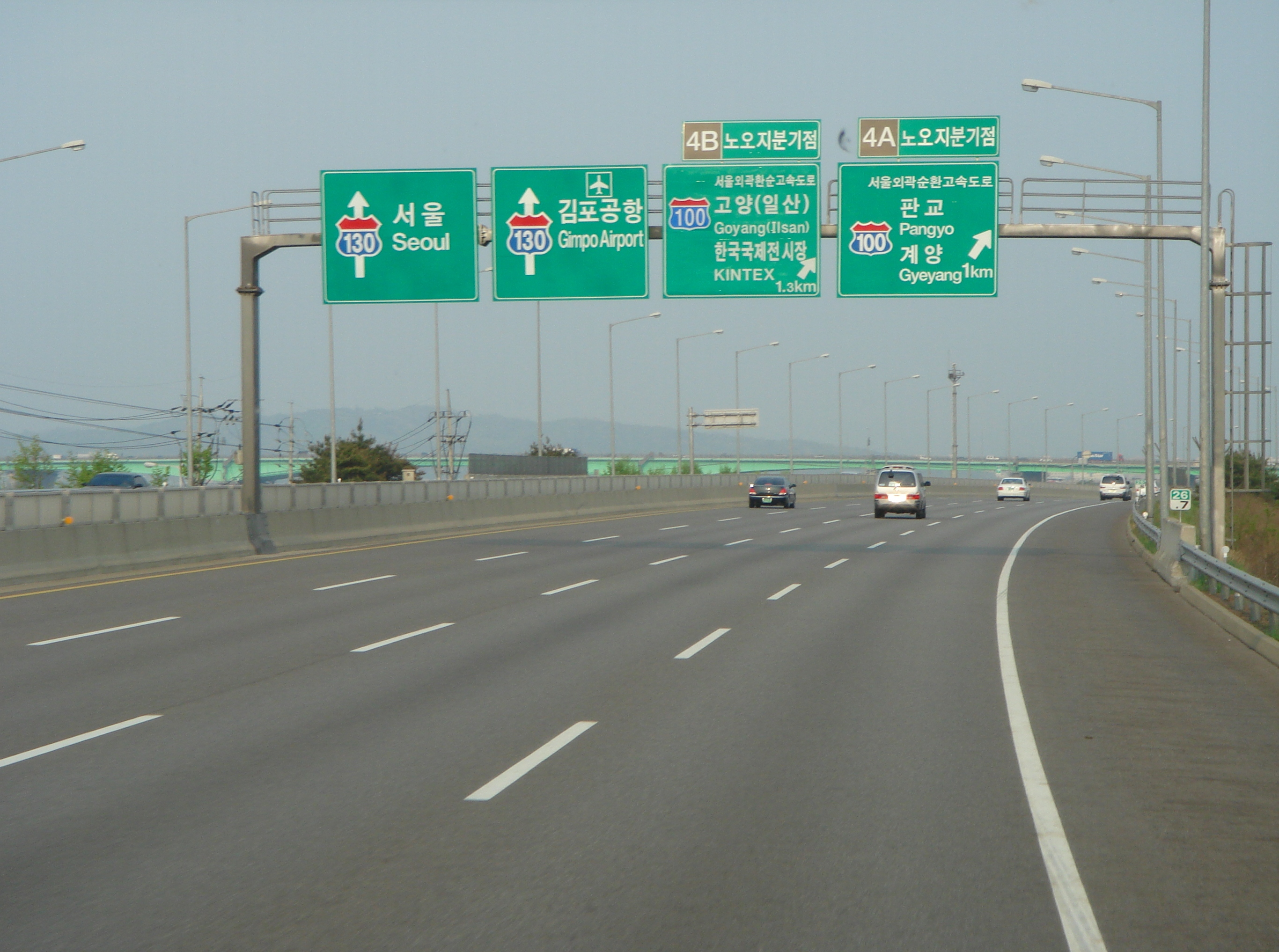
Approaching Seoul from Incheon Airport

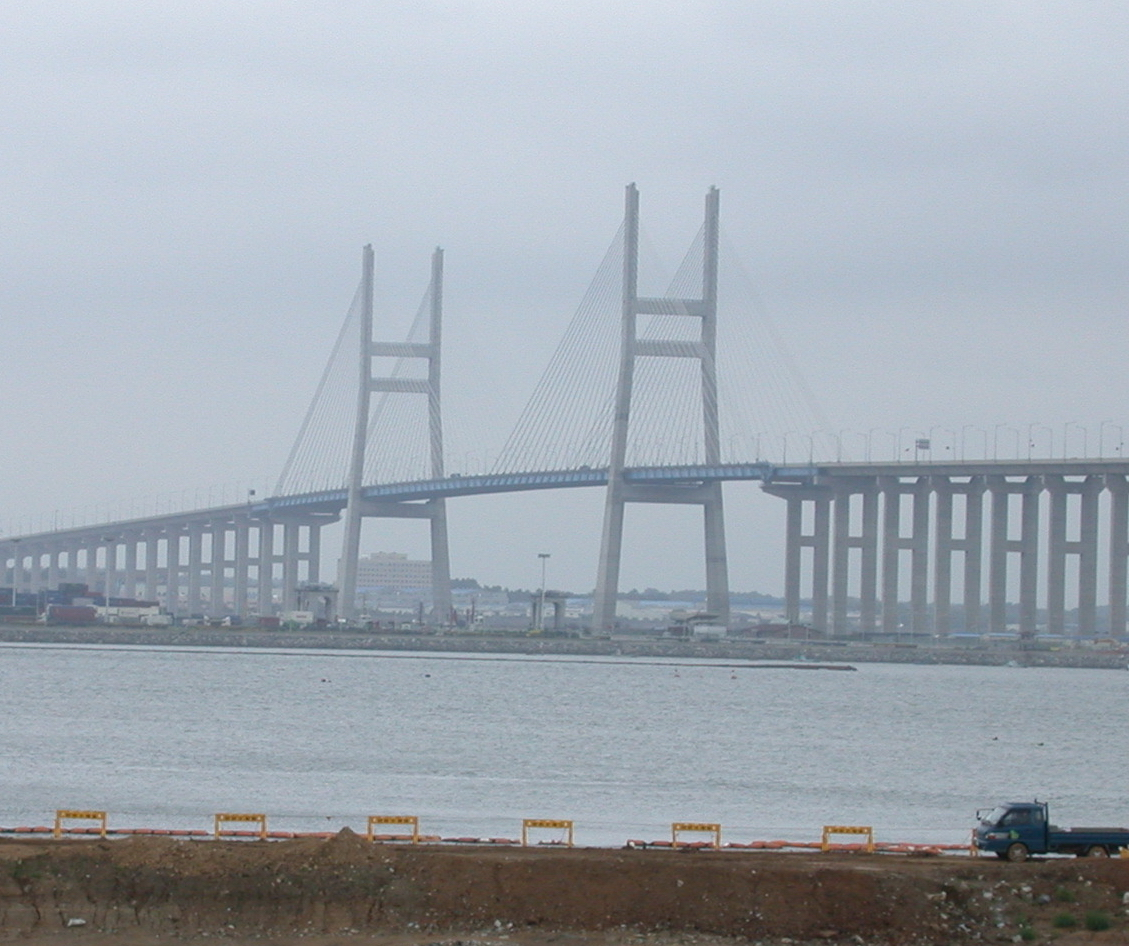
Seohae Bridge

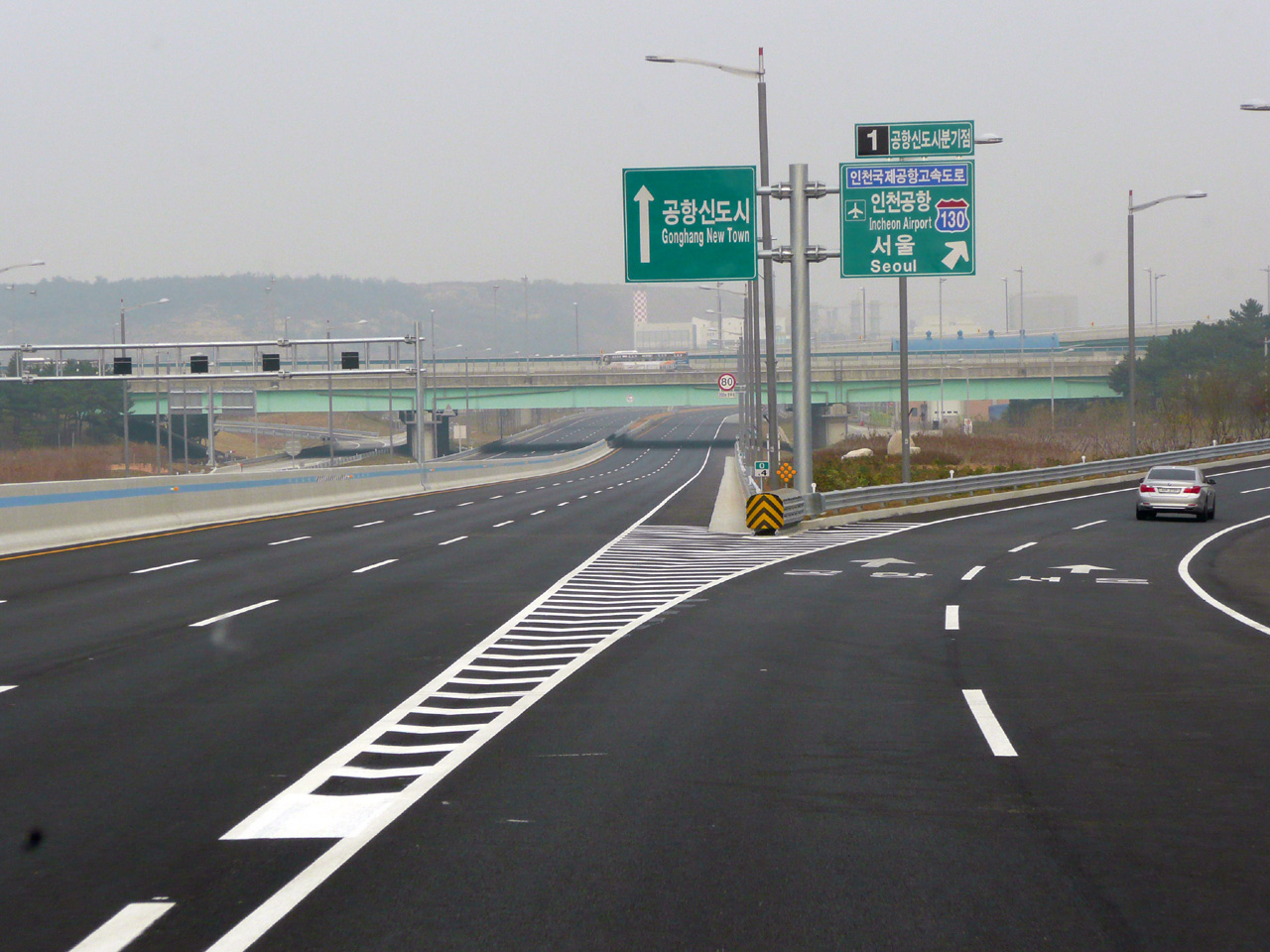
Airport Town Square junction

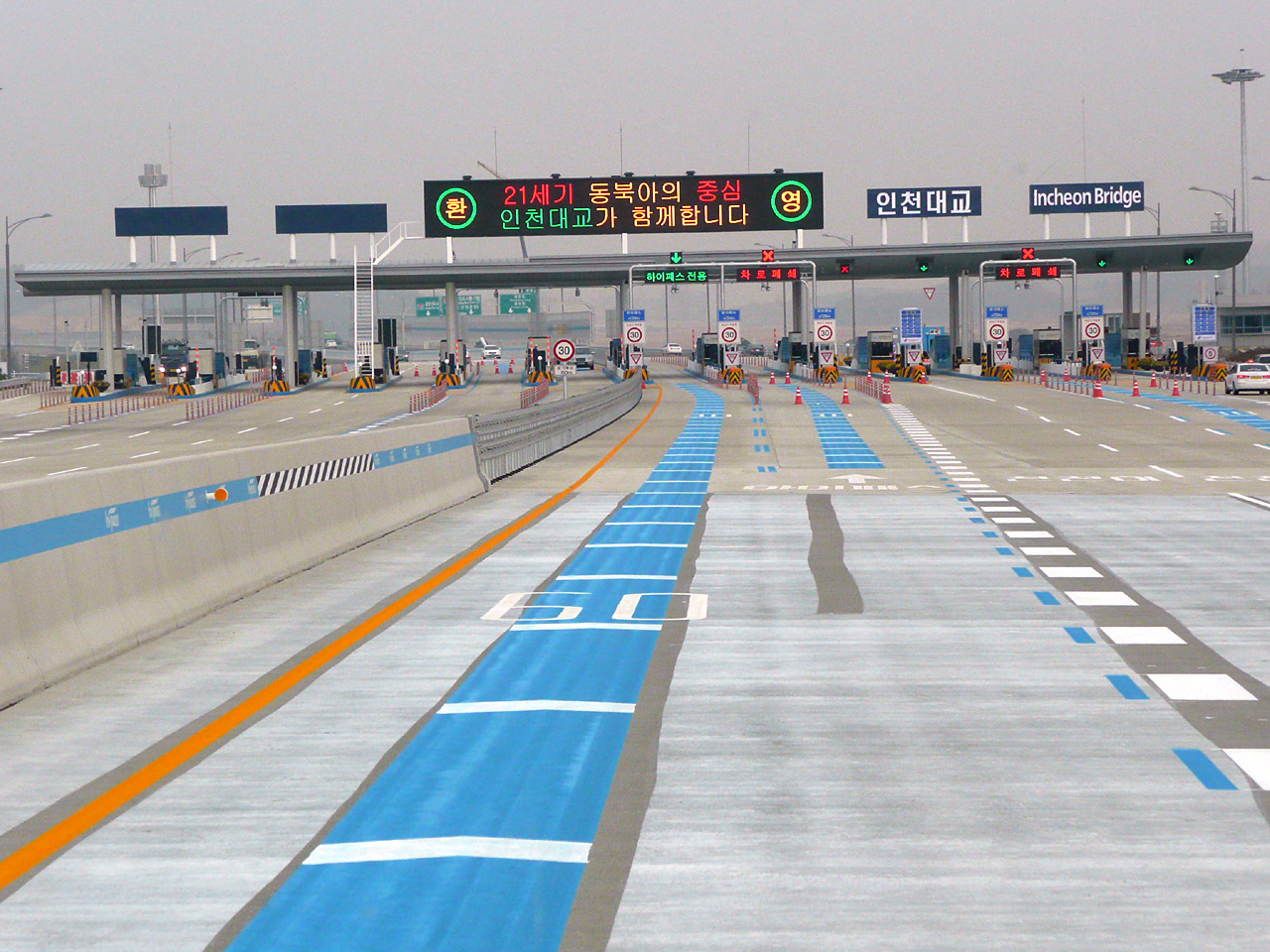
Incheon Bridge Toll Gate

==== Sri Lanka ====

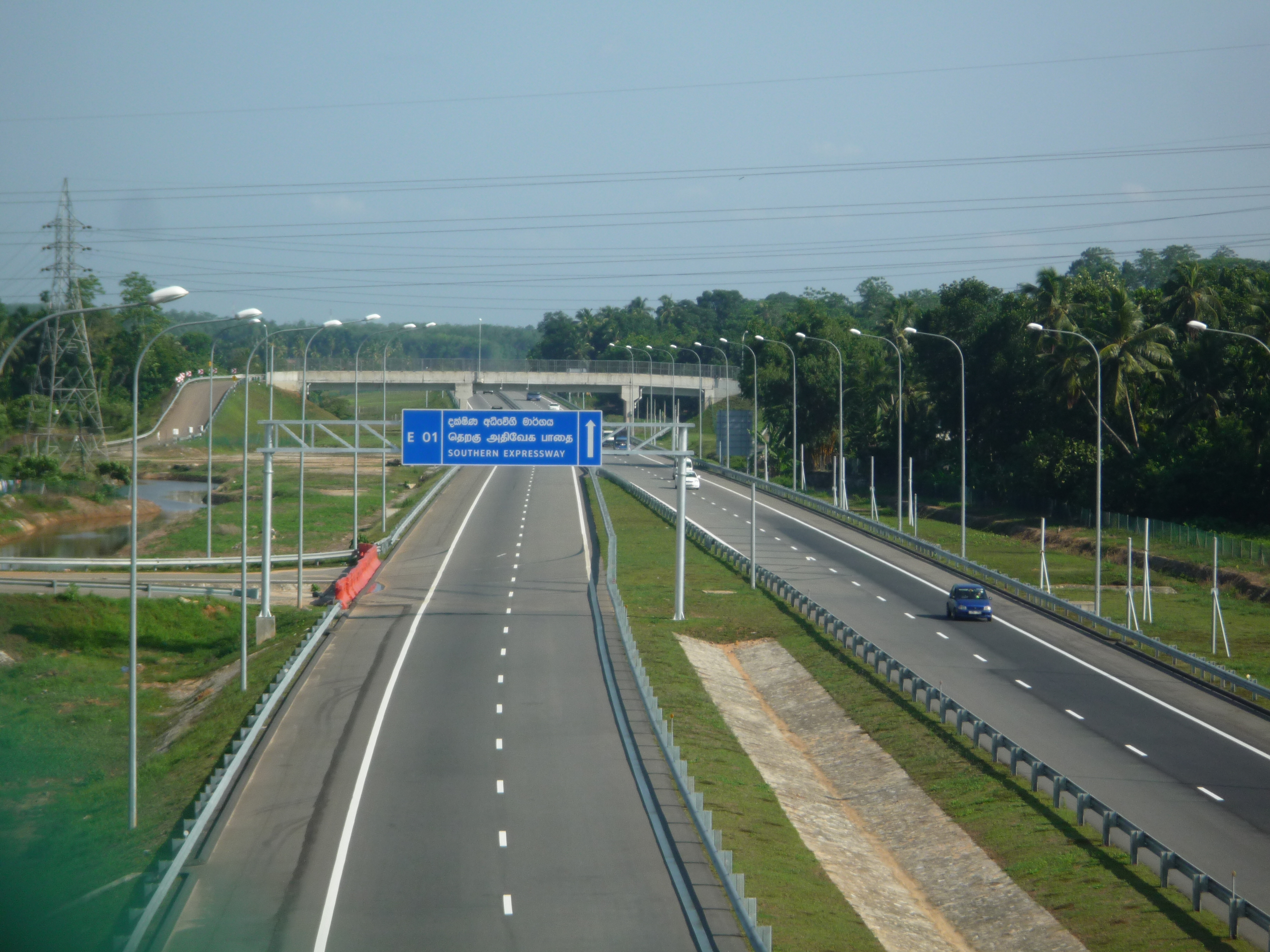
The Southern Expressway (E01) in Sri Lanka

Sri Lanka currently has over 350 km (220 mi) of designated expressways serving the southern part of the country. The first stage of the E01 Expressway (Southern Expressway) which opened in 2011 was Sri Lanka's first expressway spanning a distance of 95.3 km (59.2 mi). The second stage of the Southern Expressway opened in 2014 and extends to Matara. The E03 Expressway (Colombo–Katunayake Expressway) opened in 2013 and connects Sri Lanka's largest city Colombo with the Bandaranaike International Airport covering a distance of 25.8 km (16.0 mi). All E-Grade highways in Sri Lanka are access controlled, toll roads with speeds limits in the range of 80–110 km/h (50–68 mph). The network is to be expanded to 518.5 km (322.2 mi) by 2024.

Operational (fully or partially):

- E01 Kottawa-Hambantota
- E02 Kottawa-Kerawalapitiya
- E03 Colombo-Katunayake
- E04 Enderamulla-Kurunegala-Kandy
- E06 Kahatuduwa-Pelmadulla

Planned:

- Colombo Metropolitan expressway (Colombo Fort to Peliyagoda, connecting Colombo with the E03 expressway (Sri Lanka) Colombo-Katunayaka expressway.)

==== Syria ====
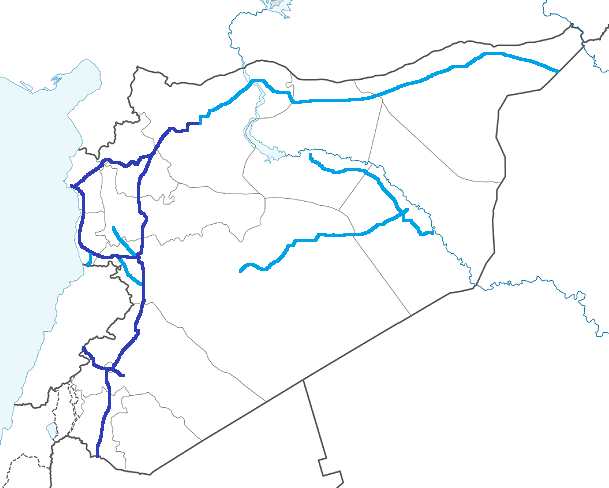
National highways in Syria

Syria has a well-developed system of motorways in the western half of the country. As the eastern part is underpopulated, it only has two lanes. Highways have been important in terms of transport for the ongoing civil war. The main motorways are:

- M1 - Runs from Homs to Latakia. It also connects Tartus, Baniyas and Jableh. Its length is 174 km (108 mi).
- M2 - Runs from Damascus to Jdeidat Yabous, on the border with Lebanon. It also connects Al-Sabboura. Its length is 38 km (24 mi).
- M4 - Runs from Latakia to Saraqib. It also connects Arihah and Jisr al-Shughur. Its length is 120 km (75 mi). It continues to the Iraqi border all the way to Mosul.
- M5 - Often described as the most important highway, it runs through much of the major cities in Syria and runs to the Jordanian border.

==== Taiwan (Republic of China) ====

National highways of Taiwan

Taiwan has an extensive road network that includes two types of controlled-access highway: freeways and expressways. Only cars and trucks are allowed onto freeways, the first of which — Freeway 1 — was completed in 1974. Expressways allow car and truck traffic as well as motorcycles with engines of 250cc or more.

Expressways in Taiwan may be controlled-access highways similar to national freeways or limited-access roads. Most have urban roads and intra-city expressways (as opposed to Highway system) status, although some are built and maintained by cities.

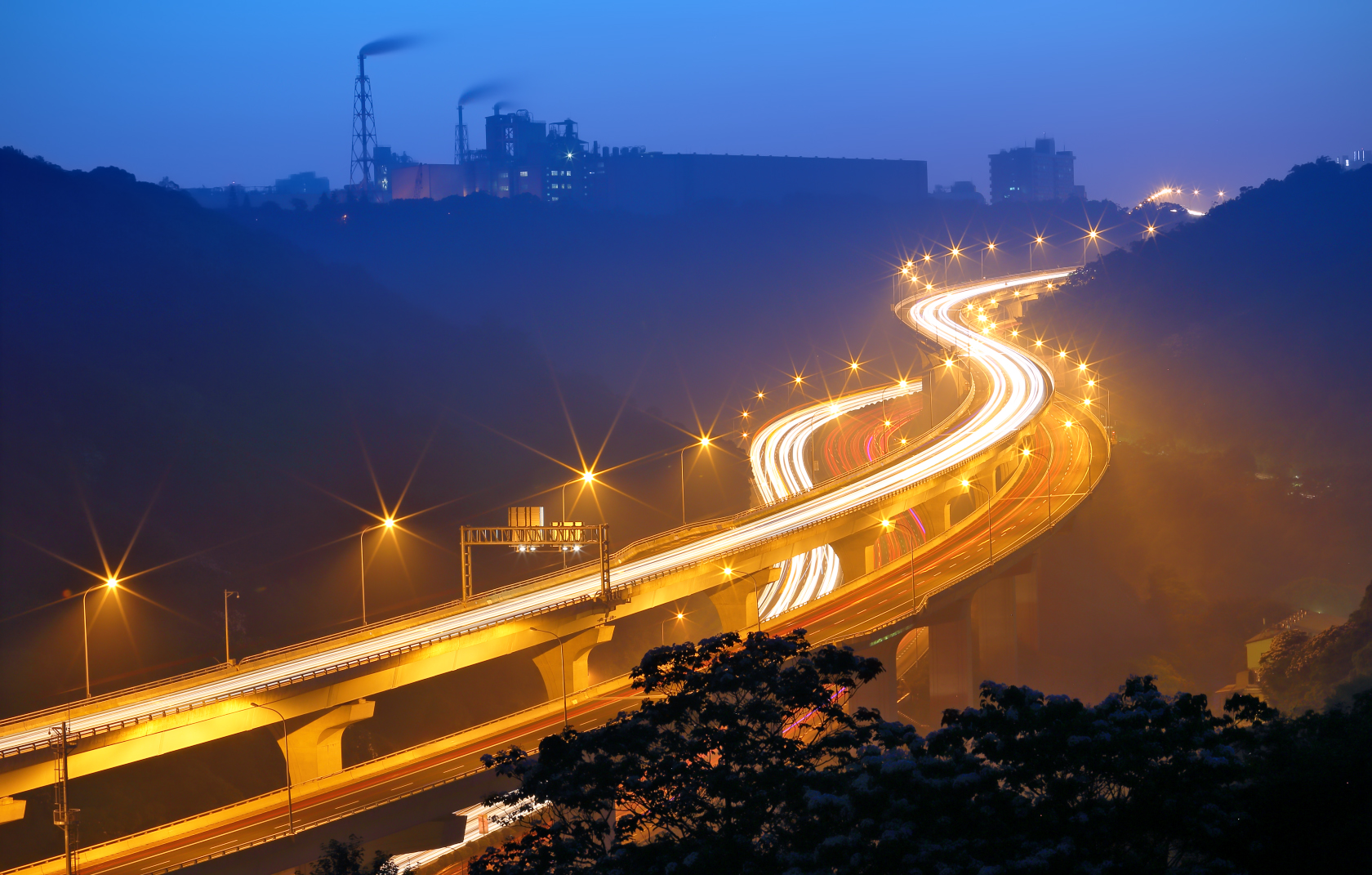
Freeway 1 in New Taipei City

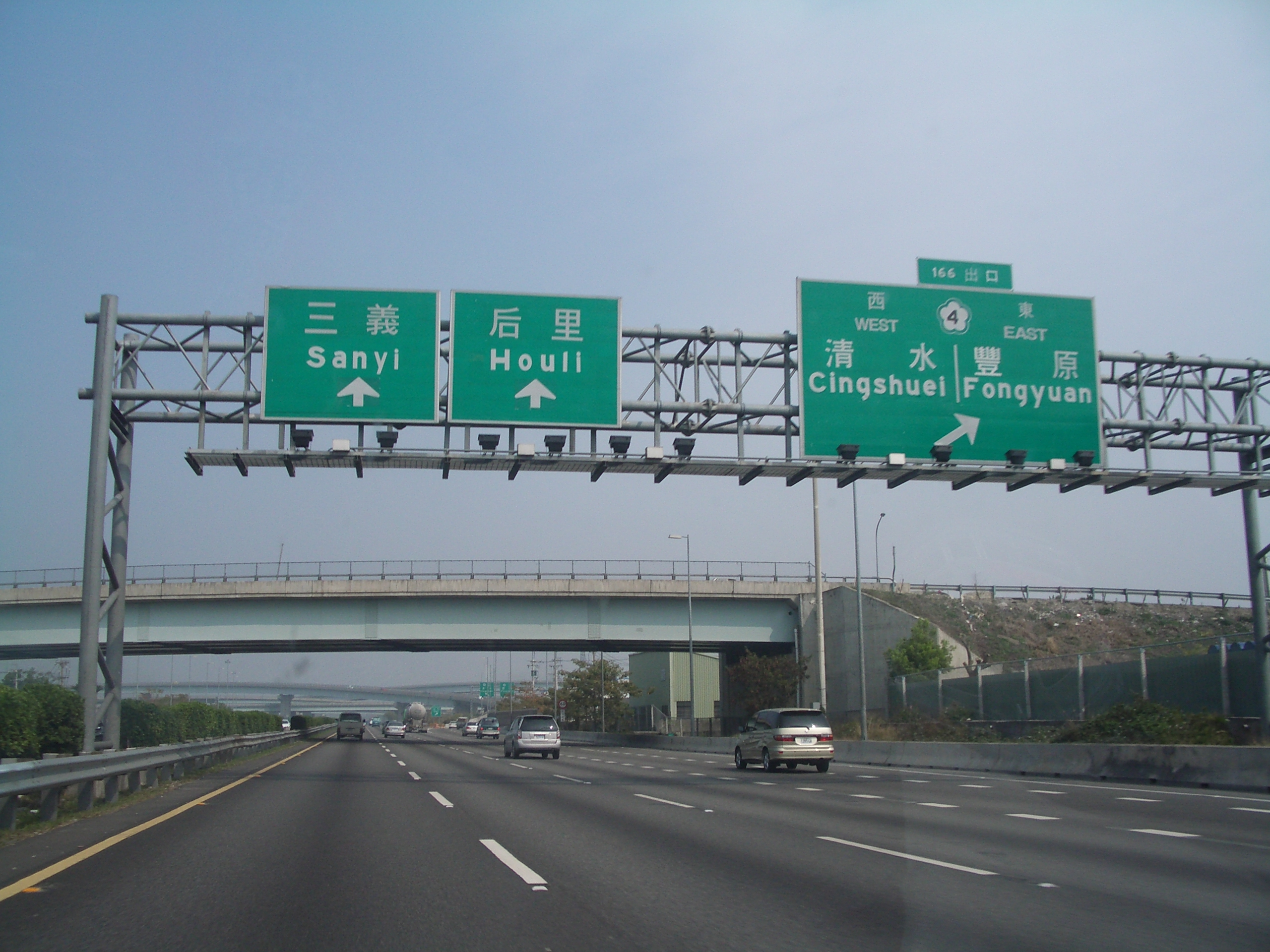
Taichung section

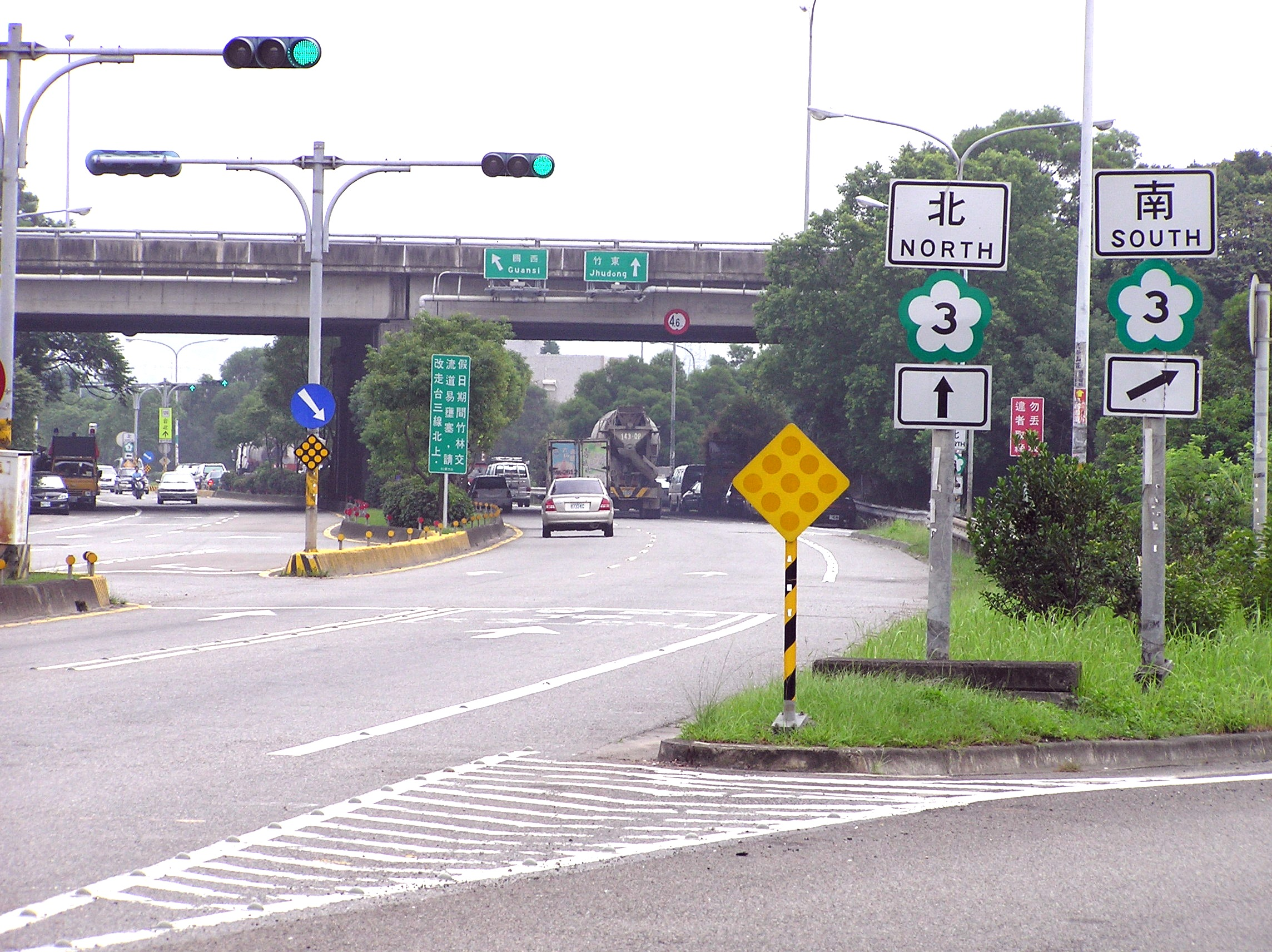
Freeway entrance

==== Thailand ====
Signs for Motorway 7 and Motorway 9 (Kanchanaphisek Road)

Sections of the expressway system

Controlled-access highways in Thailand are separated into urban expressways called expressways, which are operated by the Expressway Authority of Thailand and BEM (except Don Mueang Tollway, which is operated by Don Muang Tollway Public Company Limited) and have a span of 280.4 km (174.2 mi), while intercity expressways are called motorways, which have a span of 187 km (116 mi). The network is to be extended to 4,154.7 km (2,581.6 mi) according to the master plan.

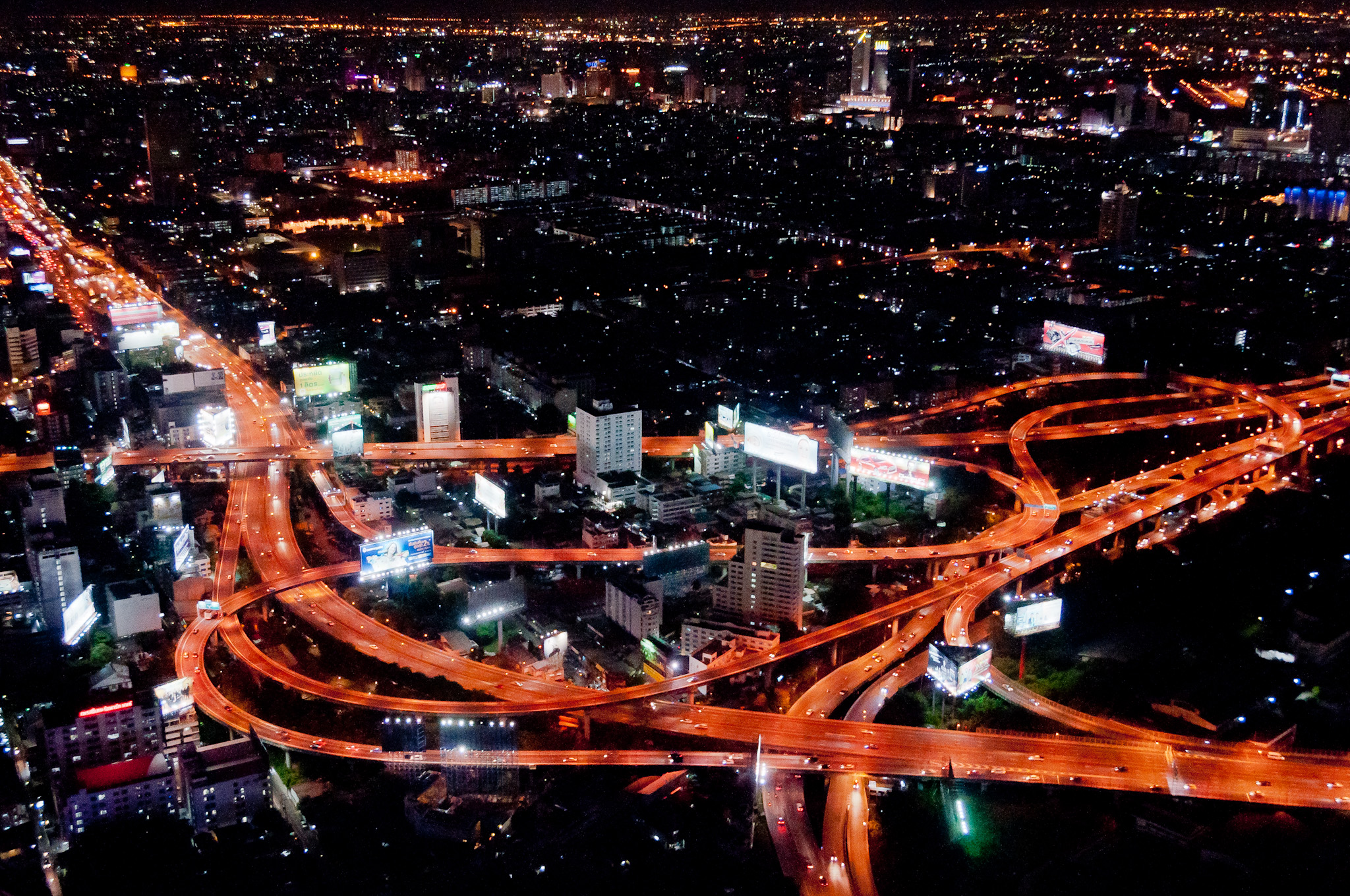
A motorway interchange in Makkasan, Bangkok

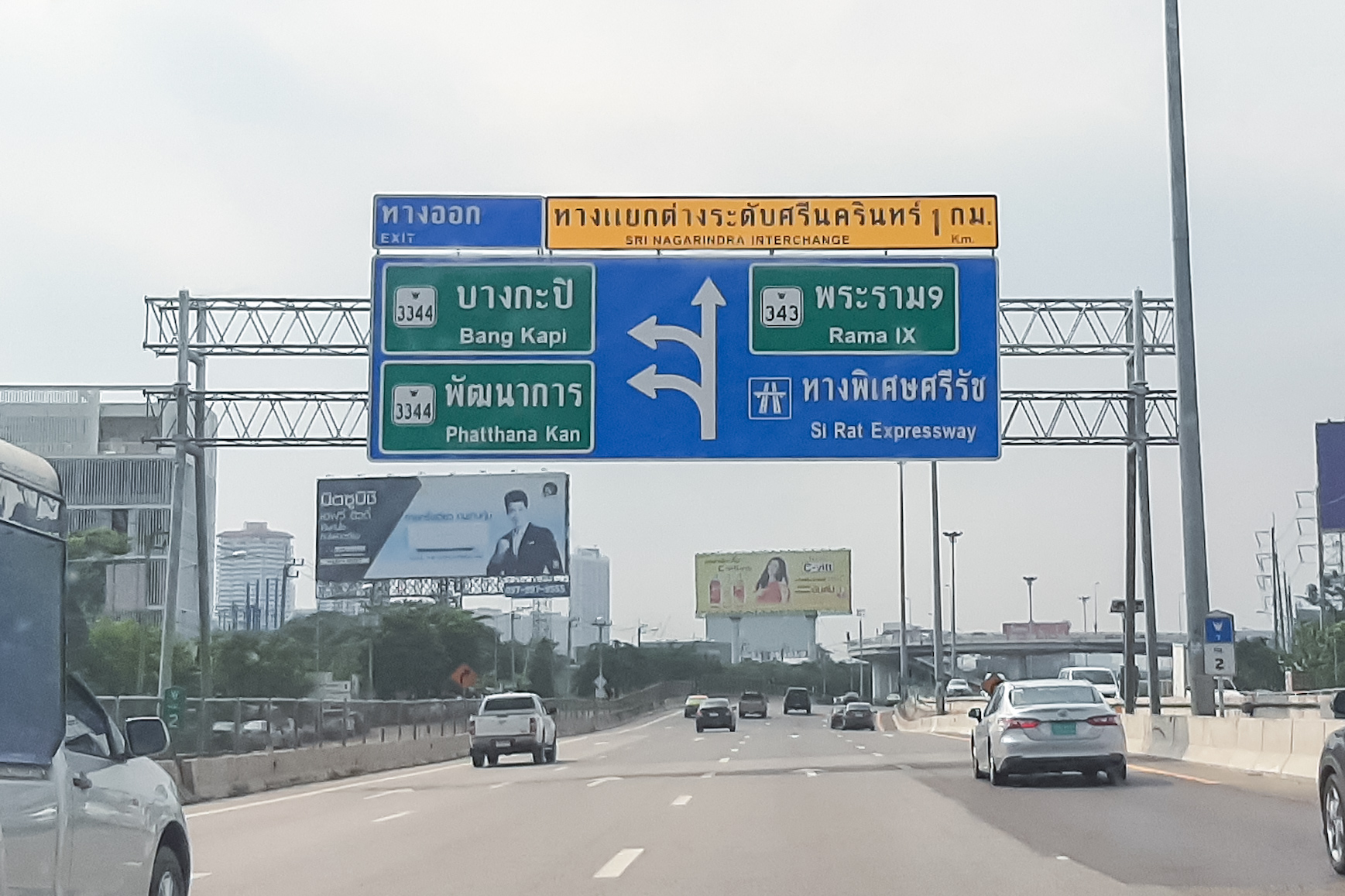
Srinagarindra Interchange head to Rama IX Road

==== Uzbekistan ====
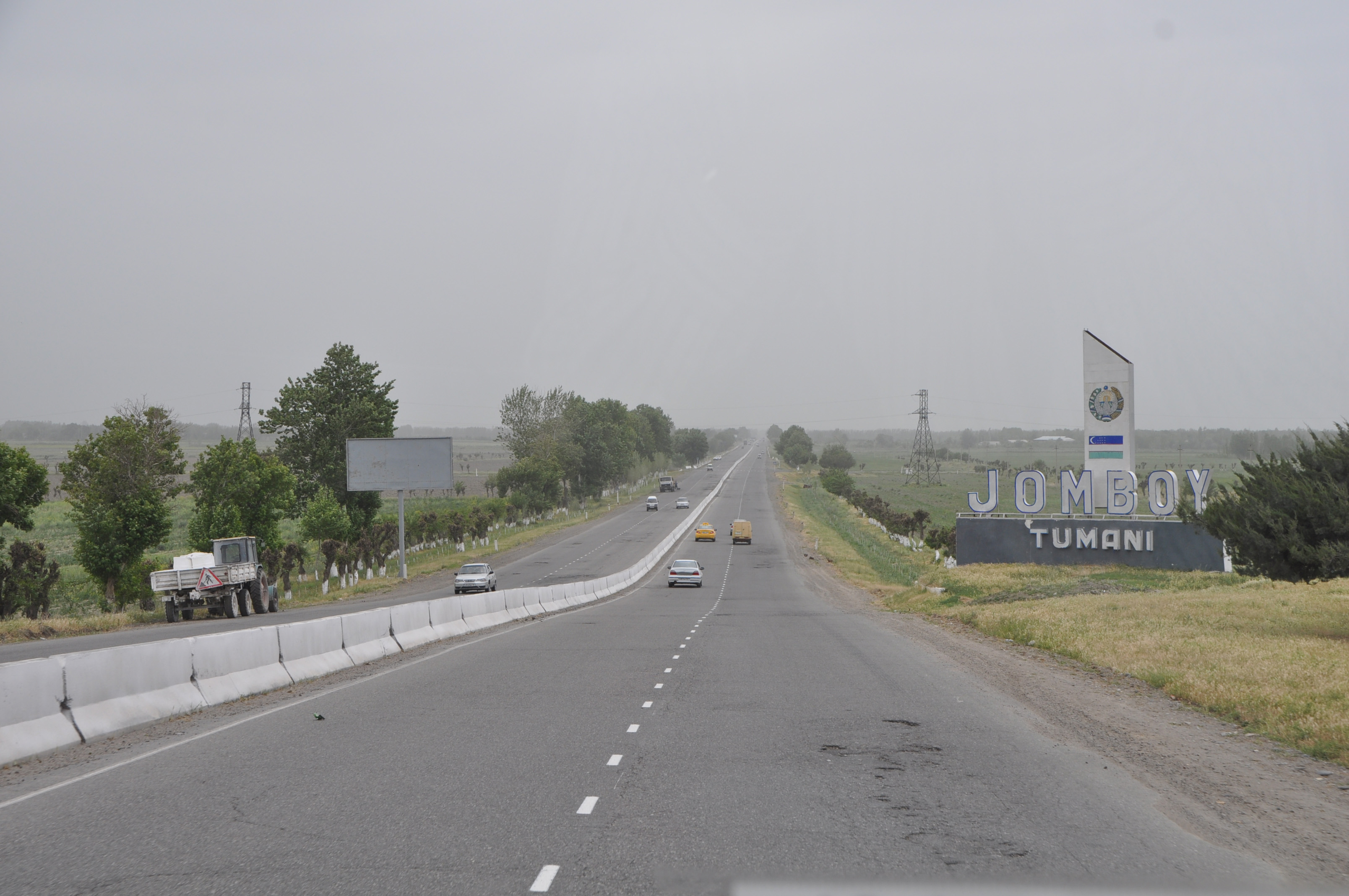
M39 Highway near Jomboy

Uzbekistan has 84,400 km (52,400 mi) of roads, about 72,000 km (45,000 mi) of which were paved. Much of the highways are in need of repair, although the condition has been improving. In 2017, the governments of Kazakhstan and Uzbekistan agreed to open a section of the M39 Highway by the Kazakh border.

==== Vietnam ====
Vietnam's motorway sign

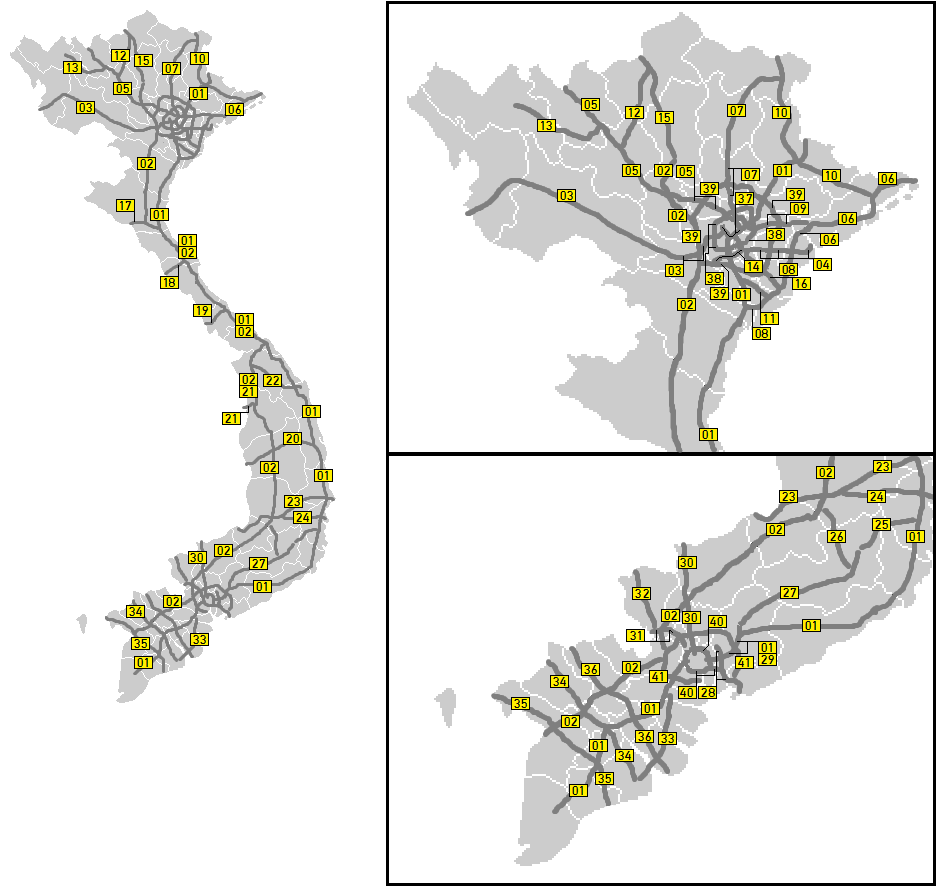
Expressway network of Vietnam

At present, the expressway system of Vietnam is 3,345 km (2,078 mi) long. The Vietnamese government plans to complete the national expressway system with a total length of 9,000 km (5,600 mi) by 2045. The expressway system in Vietnam is separate from the national highway system.

Most of the expressways are located in the North, especially around Hanoi. Of the 21 expressways in Vietnam, 8 emanate from Hanoi and 14 are in the north, with a length of 1,368 km (850 mi). The first expressway in Vietnam is the Ho Chi Minh City - Trung Luong Expressway, which is inaugurated and opened for traffic on 3 February 2010.

Currently, most of the expressways in Vietnam are four-lane highways, with some routes like Ha Noi - Haiphong, and Phap Van - Cau Gie being six-lane. The only elevated expressway in Vietnam is Mai Dich - Thanh Tri Bridge (also known as the third beltway in Hanoi). The cost of building Vietnam's highways is one of the most expensive in the world, with an average cost of $12 million per kilometre. Compared with China, where there are similarities, their highway costs only $5 million per kilometre, where in the US and European countries, costs $3–4 million per kilometre.

According to road traffic laws of Vietnam, an expressway is a road for motor vehicles, with a divider separating opposing traffic directions, no at-grade crossings with intersecting roads, fully equipped facilities to ensure continuous traffic flow, safety and short journey times, and access allowed only at interchanges.

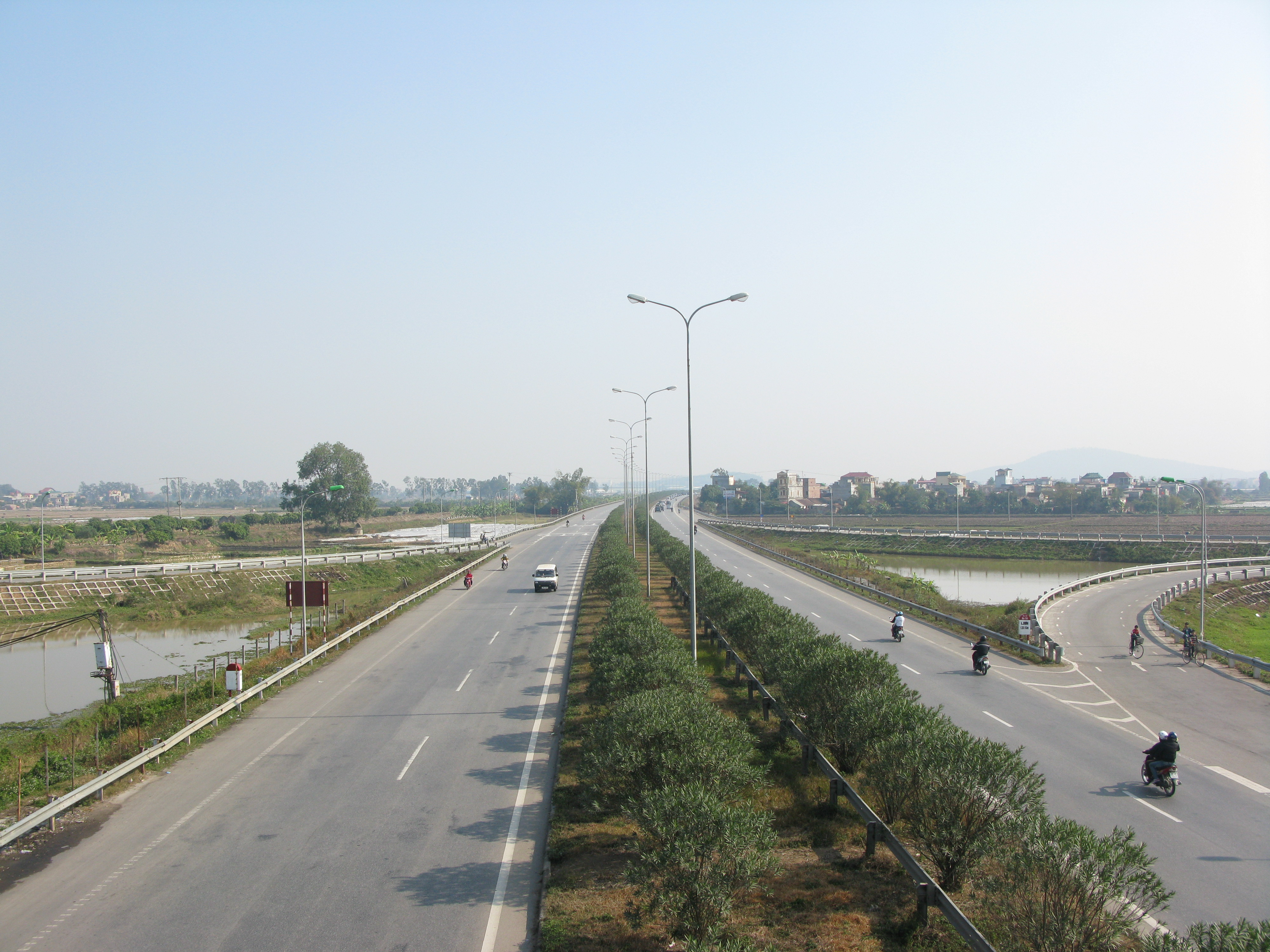
Ha Noi - Bac Giang Expressway in Bac Ninh

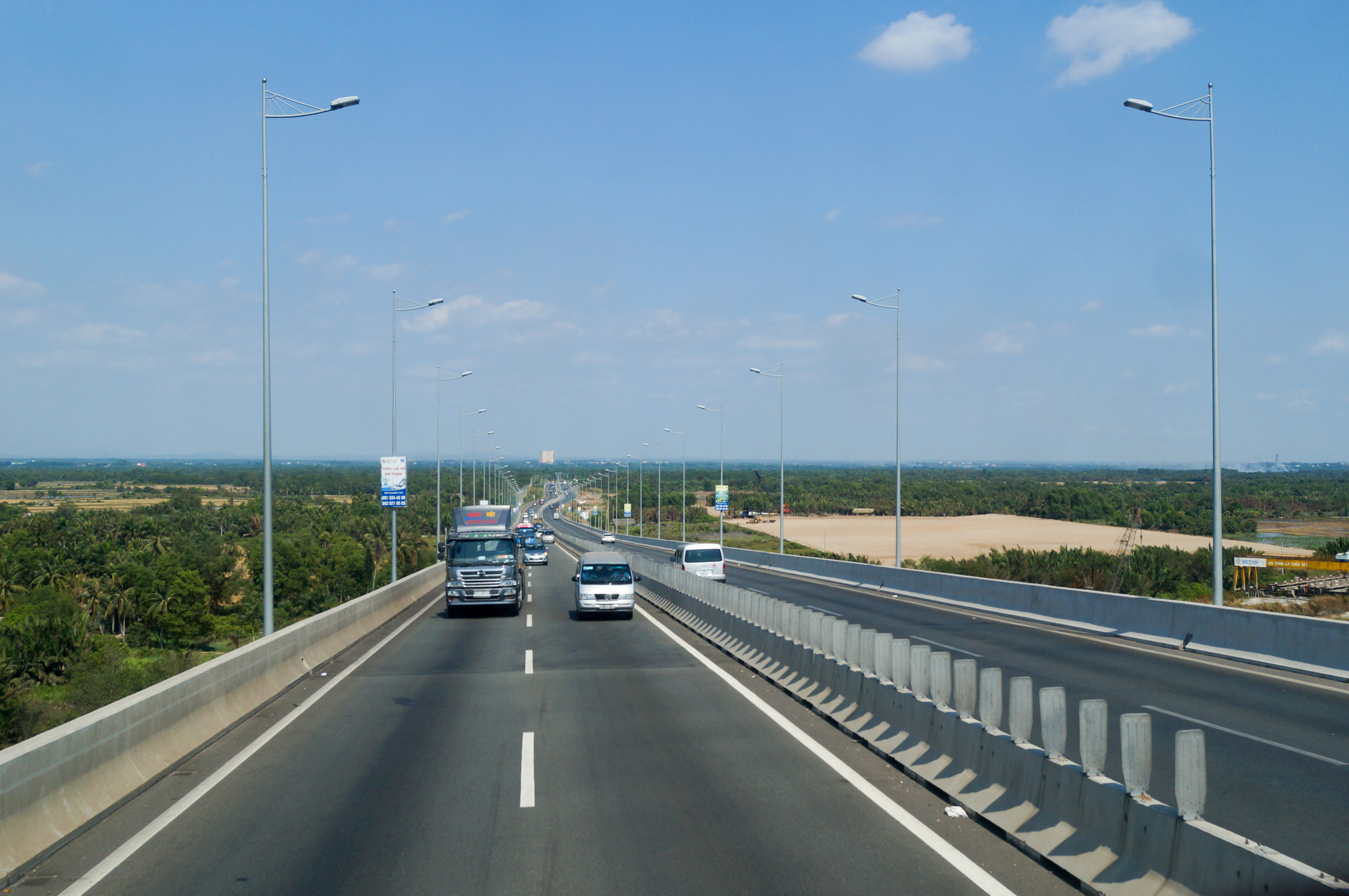
Long Thanh bridge of Ho Chi Minh City - Long Thanh - Dau Giay Expressway

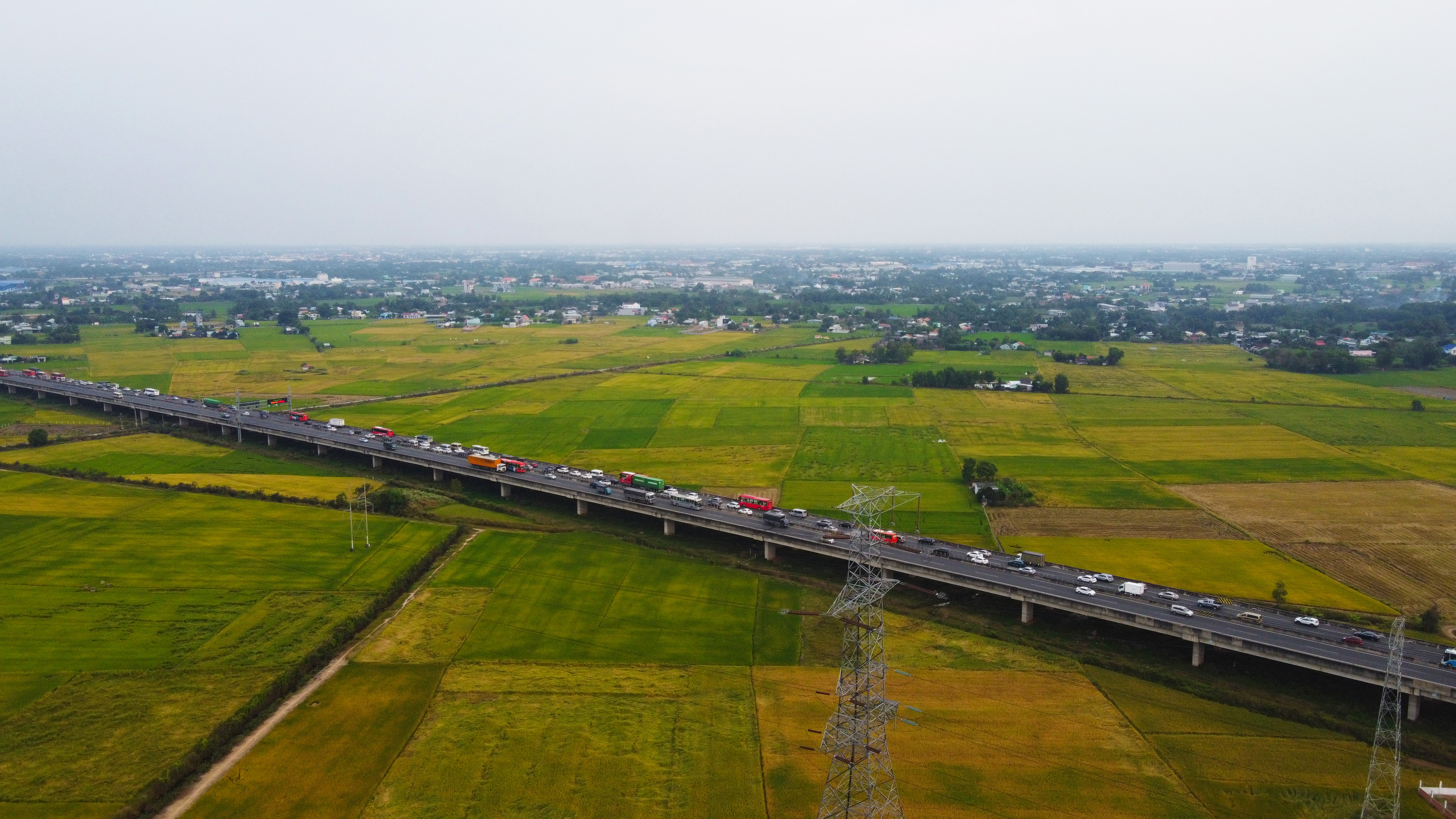
Cho Dem - Ben Luc elevated part of Ho Chi Minh City - Trung Luong Expressway

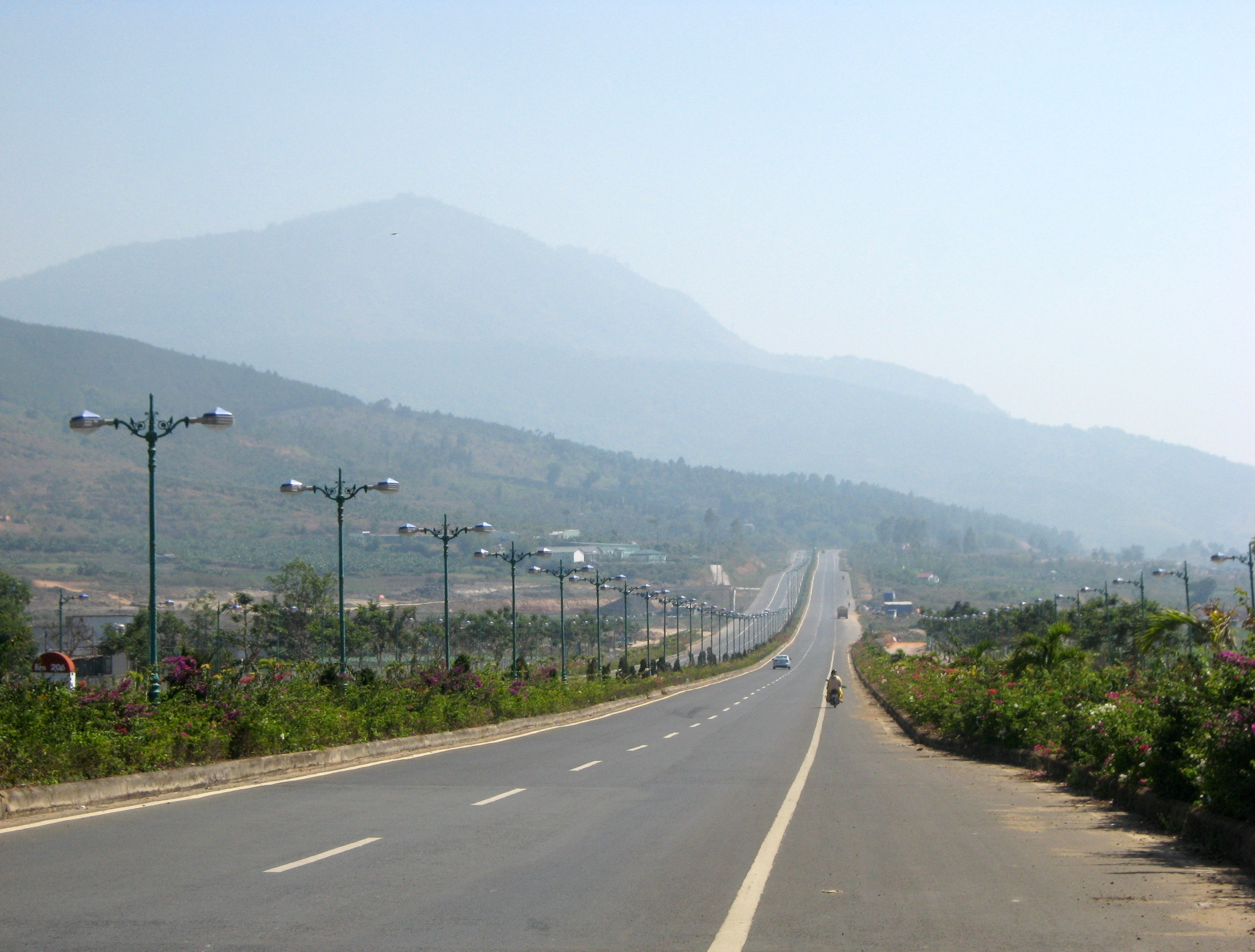
Lien Khuong - Prenn Pass Expressway

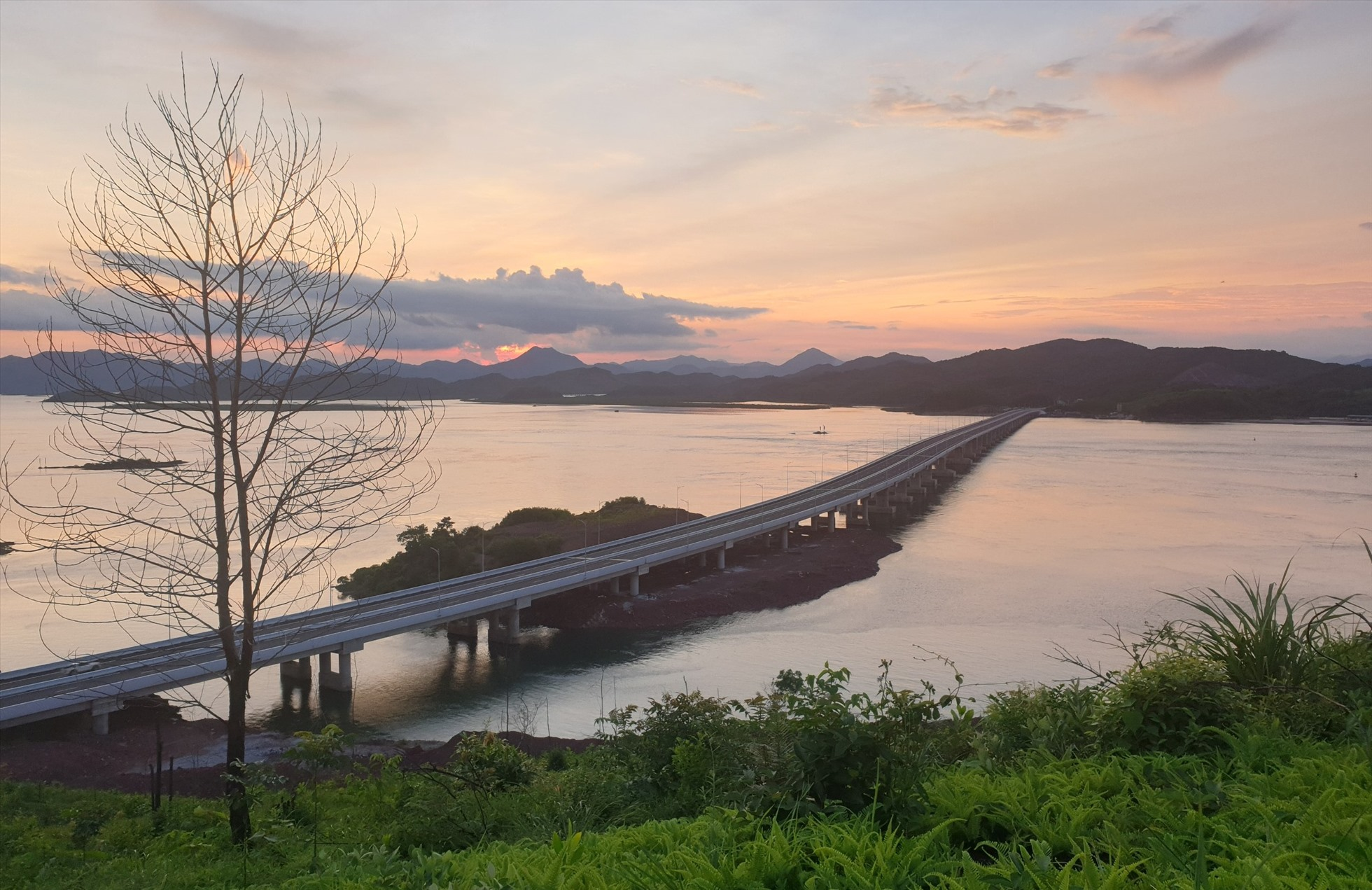
Van Tien bridge of Hai Phong - Mong Cai Expressway

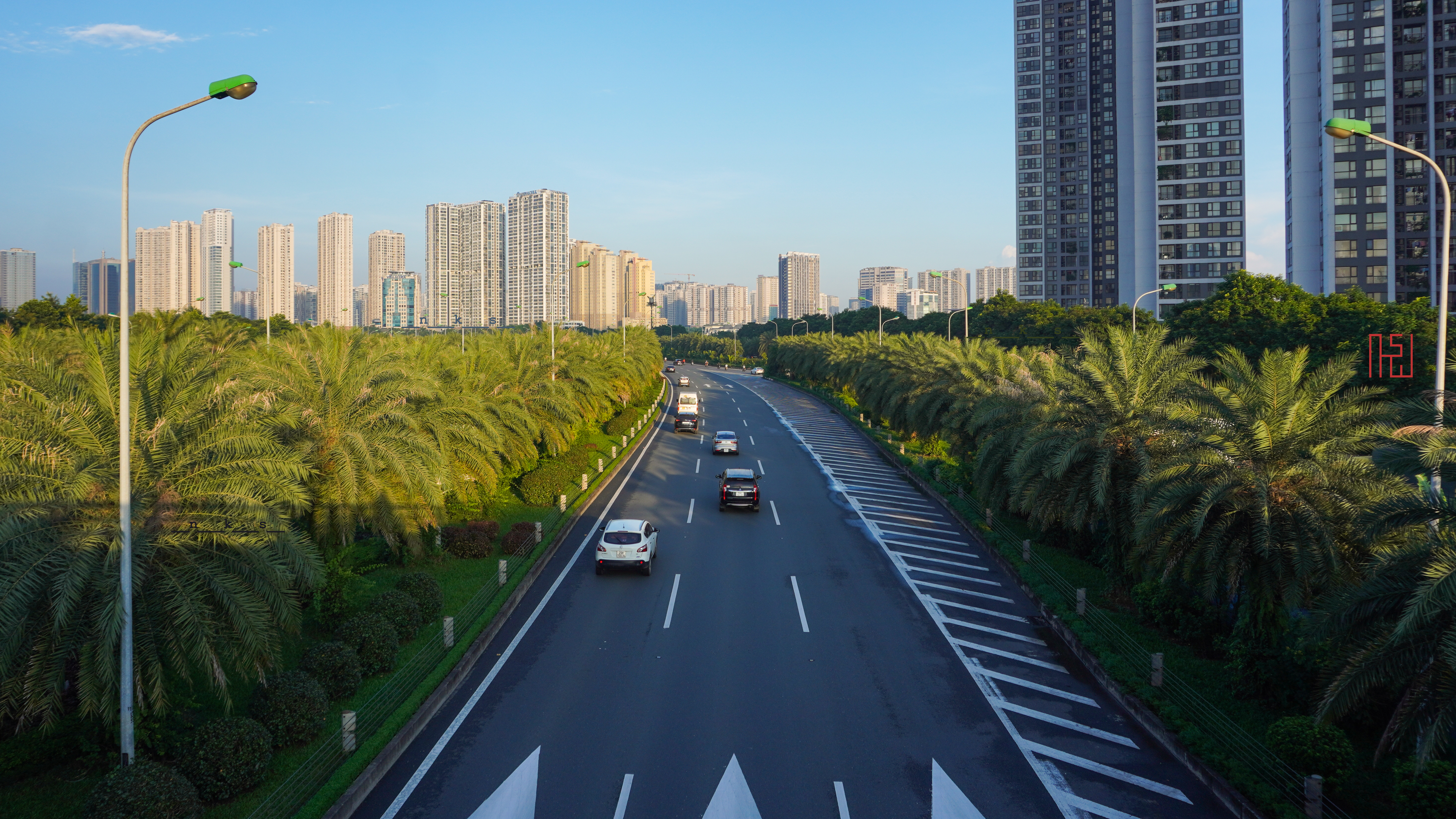
Thang Long Highway, part of Ha Noi - Dien Bien Expressway

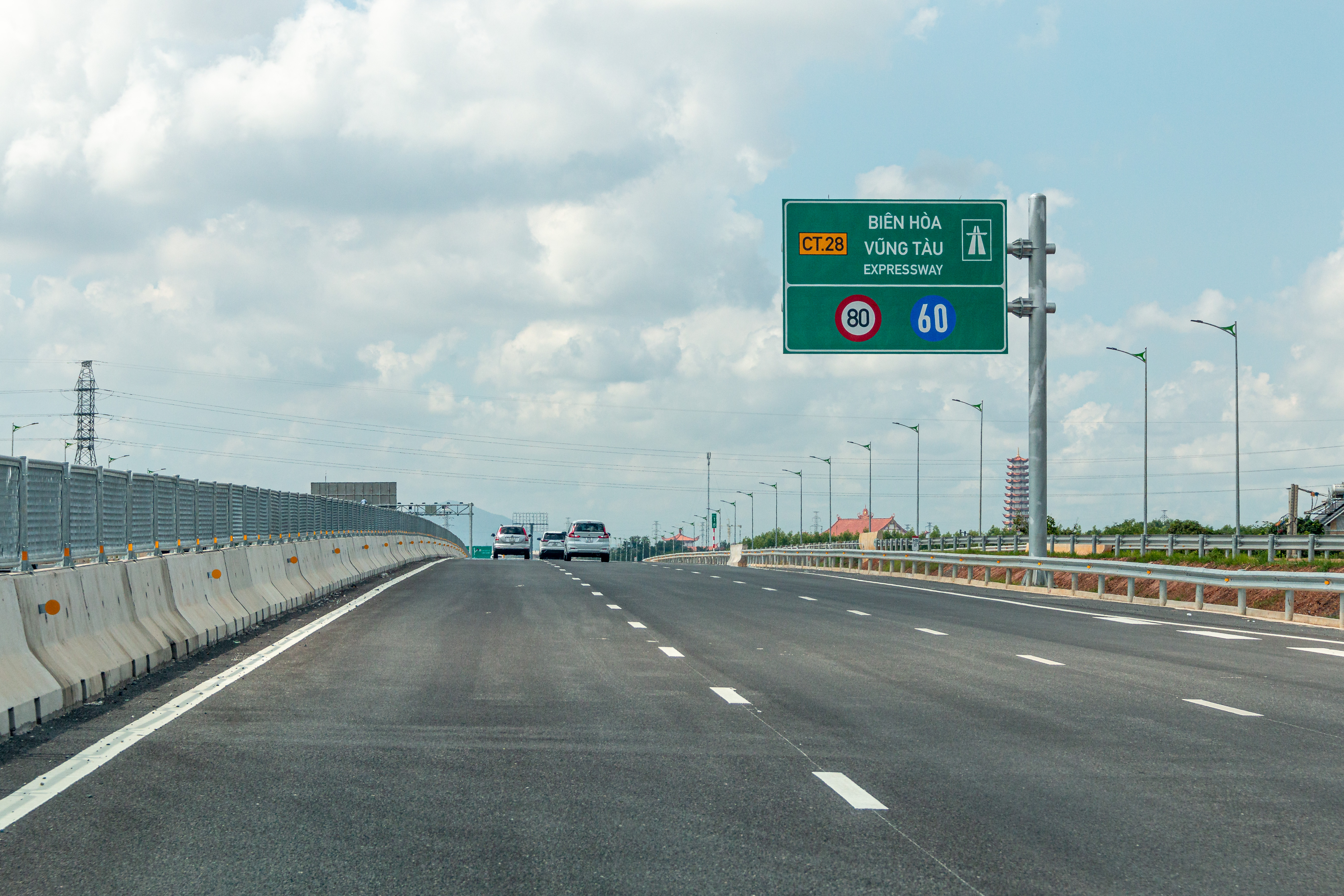
Bien Hoa - Vung Tau Expressway

=== Europe ===
Regarding road function, motorways serve exclusively the function of flow. They allow for efficient throughput of, usually long distance, motorized traffic, with unhindered flow of traffic, no traffic signals, at-grade intersections or property access and elimination of conflicts with other directions of traffic, thus, dramatically improving both safety and capacity.

Although roads are under the responsibility of each individual state, including within the European Union, there are some legal conventions (international treaties) and some European directives which give a legal framework for roads of a European importance with the goal to introduce some kind of homogenization between various members. They basically consider, at European level, three types of roads: motorways, express roads, and ordinary roads.

Some European treaties also define aspects such as the range of speed limit, or for some geometric aspects of roads, in particularly for the International E-road network.

According to Eurostat:

A motorway is a road specially designed and built for motor vehicle traffic, which does not directly provide access to the properties bordering on it. Other characteristics of motorways include:

- two separated carriageways for the opposing directions of traffic, except at special points or, temporarily, due to carriageway repairs etc.;
- carriageways that are not crossed at the level of the carriageway by any other road, railway or tramway track, or footpath; and
- the use of special signposting to indicate the road as a motorway and to exclude specific categories of road vehicles and/ or road users.

In determining the extent of a motorway its entry and exit lanes are included irrespective of the location of the motorway signposts. Urban motorways are also included in this term.

Most of the European countries use the above motorway definition but different national definitions of motorways can be found in some countries.

It is usually considered that:

- Motorways serve exclusively motorized traffic.
- Motorways have separate carriageways for the two directions of traffic.
- Motorways are not crossed at the same level by other roads, footpaths, railways
- Traffic entrance and exit is performed at interchanges only.
- Motorways have no access for traffic between interchanges and do not provide access to adjacent land.
- Motorways are especially sign-posted

Motorways status is signalled at the entry and exit of the motorway by a symbol conforming to international agreements, but specific to each country.

Sweden

Spain

Germany

United Kingdom, Ireland

Switzerland

France

Italy and Albania

Romania

Slovakia

Portugal

North Macedonia

The peripheral northern and eastern regions of the EU have a lower density motorway network. Within the European Union, there are 26 regions (NUTS level 2) with no motorway network in 2013. Those regions are islands or remote regions, for instance four overseas French regions and Corsica. The Baltic member state of Latvia, as well as four regions from Poland, and two regions from each of Bulgaria and Romania also reported no motorway network; several of these regions bordered onto adjacent non-member countries to the east of the EU.

European motorways provide reduced accident risks: 50% to 90% lower compared to standard roads, when new motorways only reduce injuries by 7%.

Some of the things which are considered as providing safety in the European motorways are central medians, grade separated interchanges, and access restrictions.

Nonetheless, some specific conditions provide a height risk of a more severe accidents, such as:

- improper use of emergency lane,
- cross-median head-on accidents,
- wrong direction accidents.

==== Albania ====

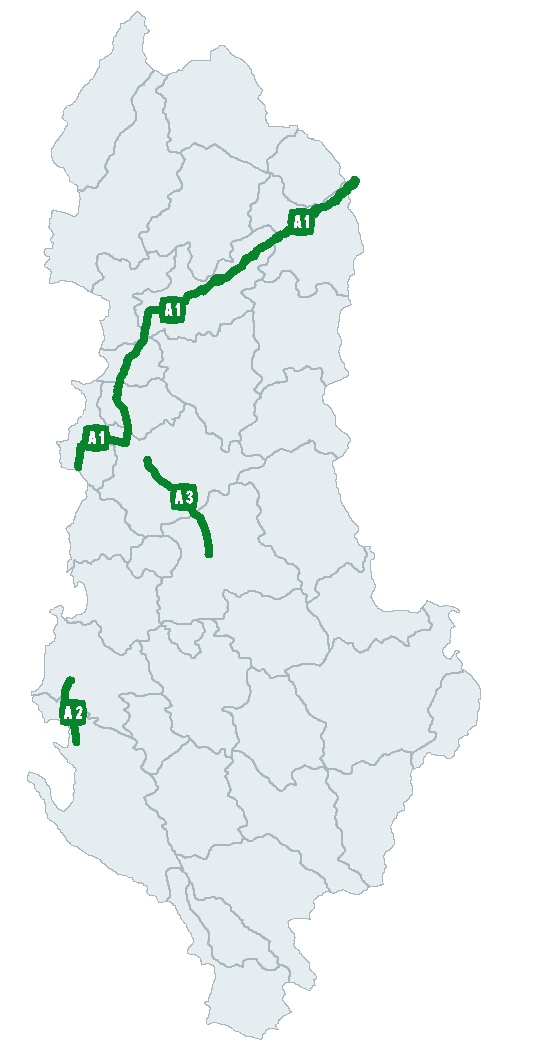
Current map of Albanian motorways

Highways in Albania form part of the recent Albanian road system. Following the collapse of communism in 1991, the first highways in Albania started being constructed, The first was SH2, connecting Tirane with Durrës via Vora. Since the 2000s, main roadways have drastically improved, though lacking standards in design and road safety. This involved the construction of new roadways and the putting of contemporary signs. However, some state roads continue to deteriorate from lack of maintenance while others remain unfinished.

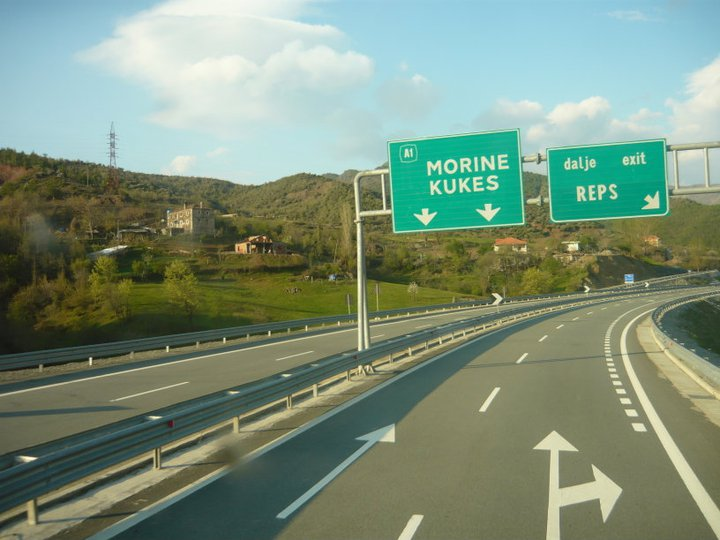
A1 Nation's Highway in Northern Albania connecting Albania with Kosovo

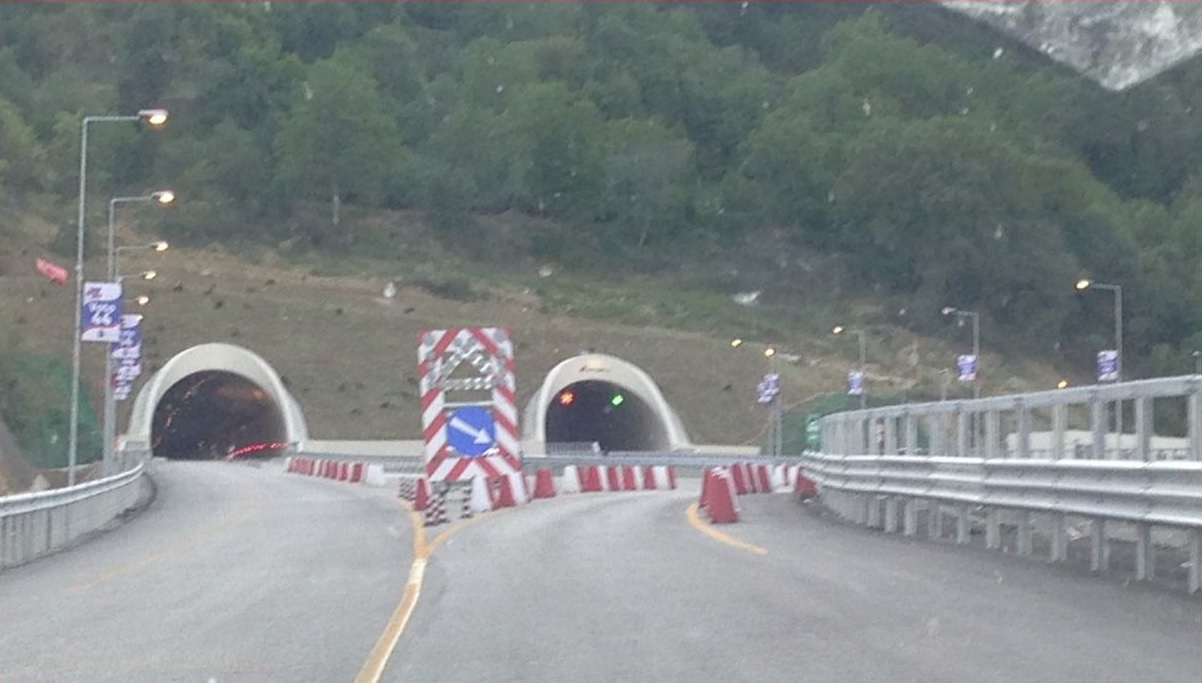
Krraba Tunnel on the A3 Tirana, Elbasan, Albania

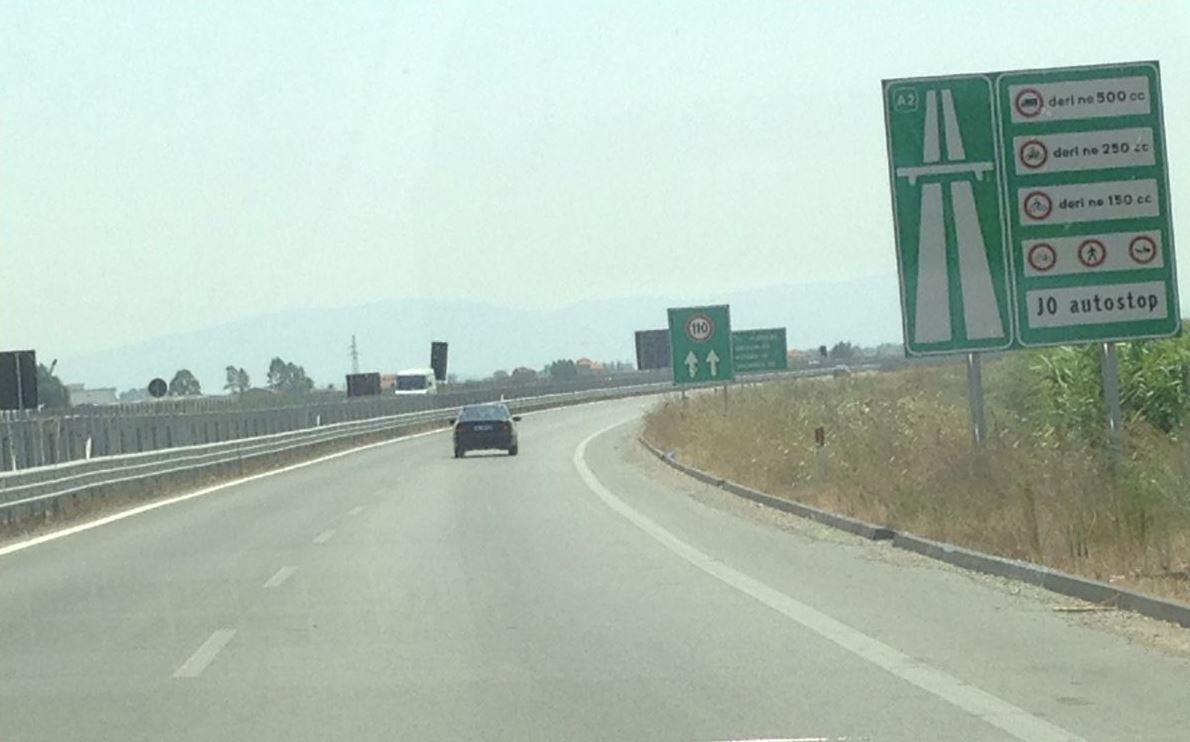
A2 Fier - Vlore known as the Independence Highway

==== Austria ====

A map of the Austrian Autobahn and Schnellstraße system. Blue = Autobahn; Green = Schnellstraße; Dotted = planned or under construction.

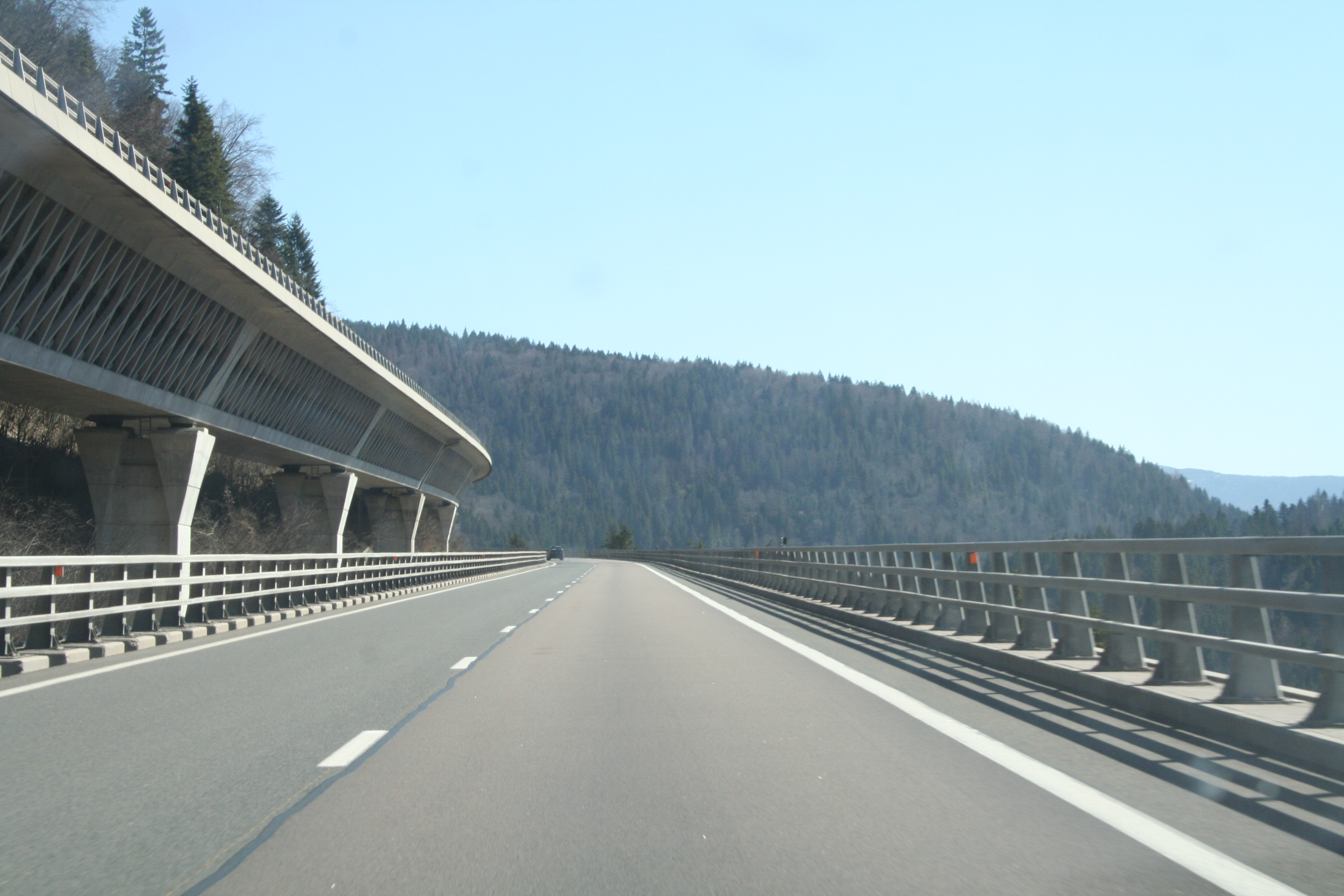
A40 Motorway Between Nantua and Geneva

The Austrian autobahns (German: Autobahnen) are controlled-access highways in Austria. They are officially called German: Bundesstraßen A (Bundesautobahnen) under the authority of the federal government according to the Austrian Federal Road Act (Bundesstraßengesetz), not to be confused with the former Bundesstraßen highways maintained by the Austrian states since 2002.

Austria currently has 18 Autobahnen, since 1982 built and maintained by the self-financed ASFiNAG stock company in Vienna, which is wholly owned by the Austrian republic and earns revenue from road-user charges and tolls. Each route bears a number as well as an official name with local reference, which however is not displayed on road signs. Unusually for European countries, interchanges (between motorways called Knoten, "knots") are numbered by distance in kilometres starting from where the route begins; this arrangement is also used in the Czech Republic, Slovakia, Hungary, Spain, and most provinces of Canada (and in most American states, albeit in miles). The current Austrian Autobahn network has a total length of 1,720 km (1,070 mi).

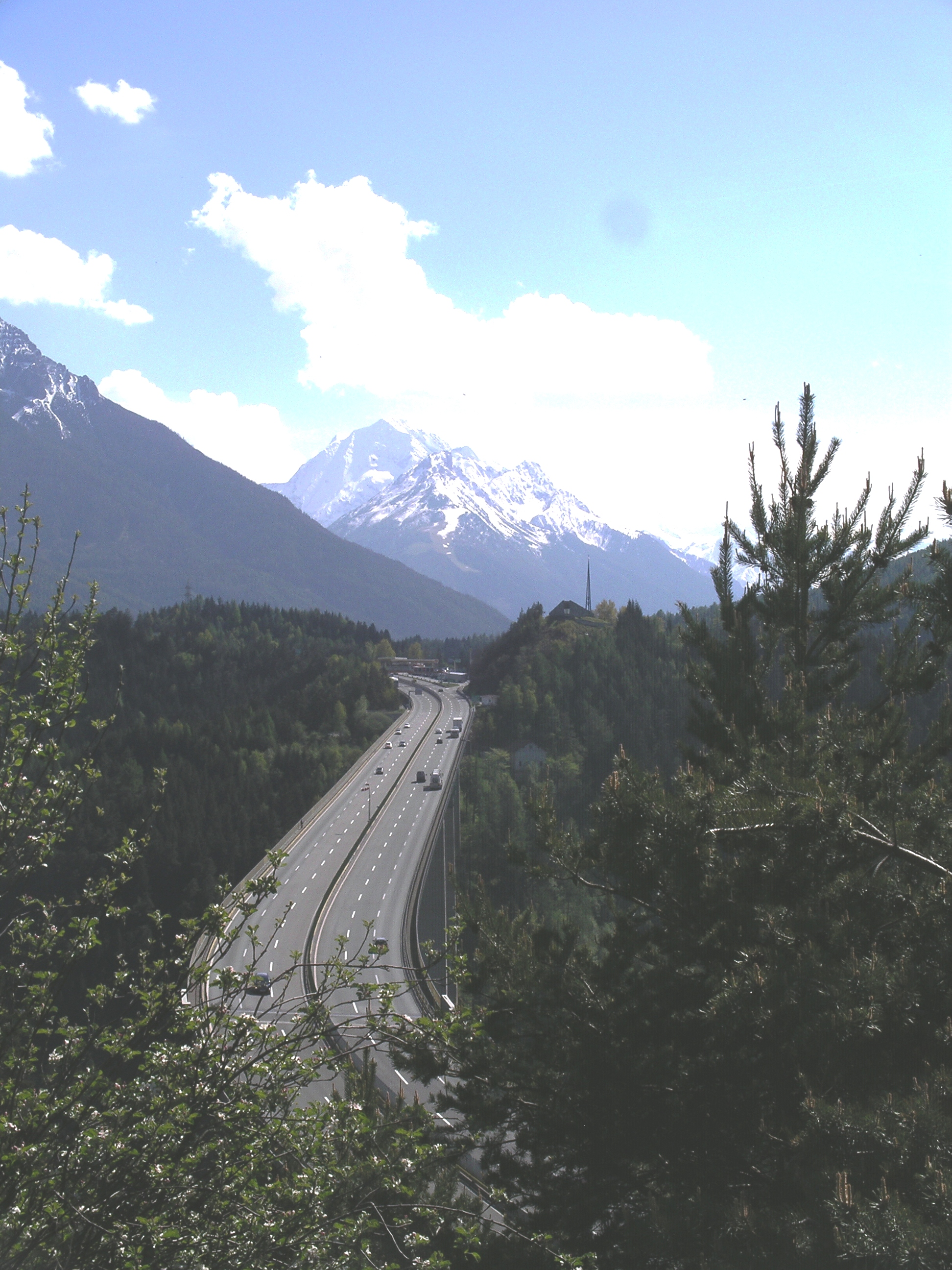
Brenner Autobahn near Innsbruck

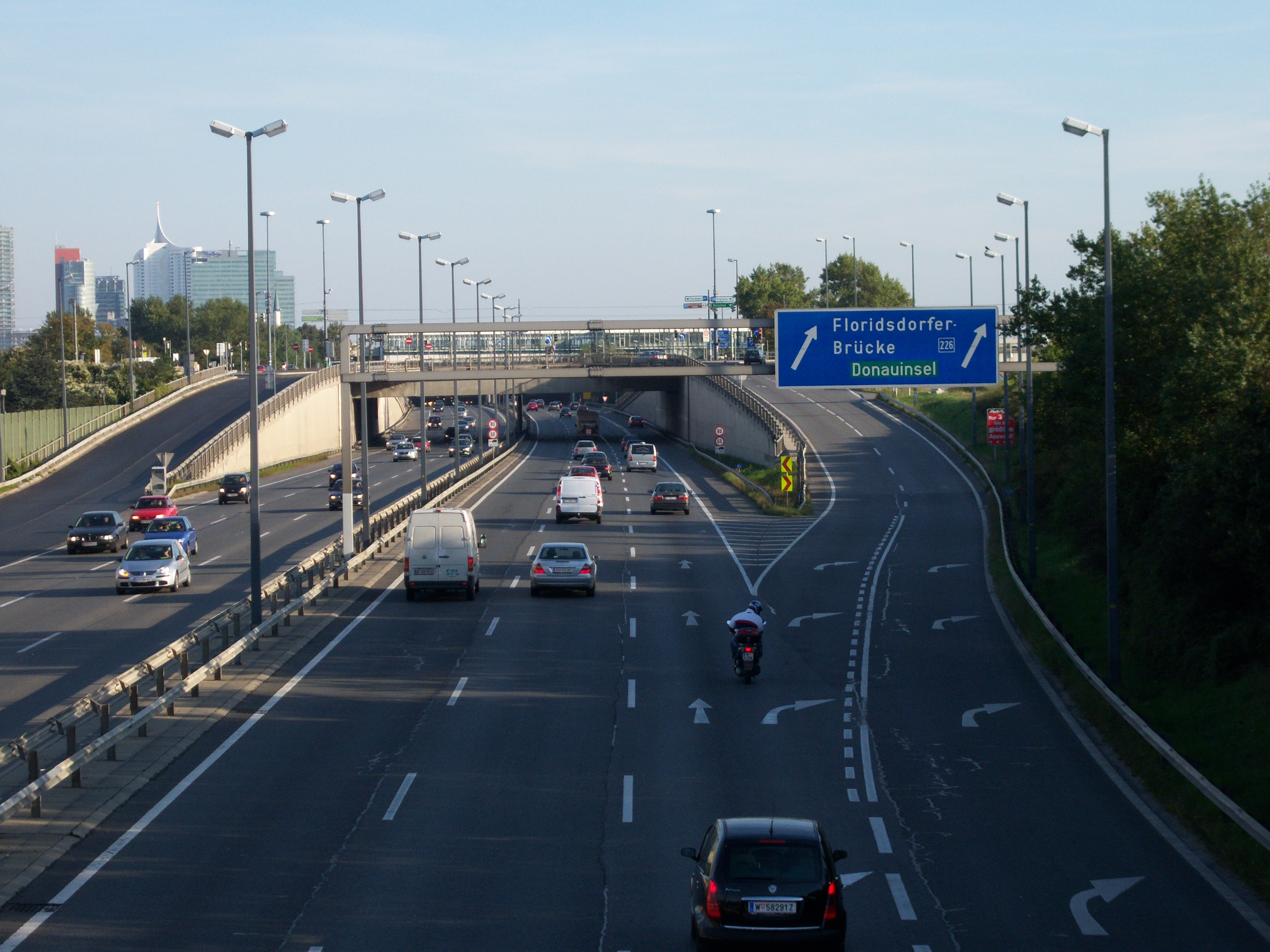
A22 Donauuferautobahn, near the exit Floridsdorfer Brücke

==== Belgium ====

Motorways in Belgium

In 1937, the first motorway between Brussels and Ostend was completed, following the example of neighbouring countries such as Germany. It mainly served local industries and tourism as a connection between the capital city and a coastal region. However, the Second World War and the reparation of the complete road network after the war caused a serious delay in the creation of other motorways. In 1949, the first plans were made to build a complete motorway network of 930 km (580 mi) that would be integrated with the neighbouring networks. Although the plans were ready, the construction of the motorway network was much slower than in neighbouring countries because the project was deemed not to be urgent.

Because of economic growth in the 1960s, more citizens could afford cars, and the call for good-quality roads was higher than ever before. In each year between 1965 and 1973, over 100 km (62 mi) of motorway were built. At the end of the 1970s, the construction of motorways slowed down again due to costs, combined with an economic crisis, more expensive fuel and changing public opinion. In the following years, the only investments done were to complete already started motorway constructions. But most important cities were already connected. In 1981, the responsibilities for construction and maintenance of the motorways shifted from the federal to the regional governments. This sometimes caused tensions between the governments. For example, the part of the ring road around Brussels that crosses Wallonian territory has never been finished, since only Flanders suffers from the unfinished ring.

Belgium today has the longest total motorway length per area unit of any country in the world. Most motorway systems in Belgium have at least three lanes in each direction. Nearly all motorways have overhead lighting including those in rural areas. The dense population of Belgium and the still unfinished state of some motorways, such as the ring roads around Brussels and Antwerp cause major traffic congestion on motorways. On an average Monday morning in 2012, there was a total of 356 km (221 mi) of traffic jams and the longest traffic jam of the year was 1,258 km (782 mi), purely on the motorways.

==== Bosnia and Herzegovina ====

Bosnia and Herzegovina has more than 208 km (129 mi) of highway, which connects Kakanj-Sarajevo. There is a plan to build highway on Corridor Vc, which will go from river Sava, across Doboj, Sarajevo and Mostar to Adriatic Sea. Next sections are Kakanj-Drivuša 16 km (9.9 mi), Zenica Sjever-Drivuša 11 km (6.8 mi), Svilaj-Odžak 11 km (6.8 mi), Vlakovo-Tarčin 20 km (12 mi), Počitelj-Bijača 21 km (13 mi). The speed limit is 130 km/h (81 mph) or 100 km/h (62 mph) in tunnels.

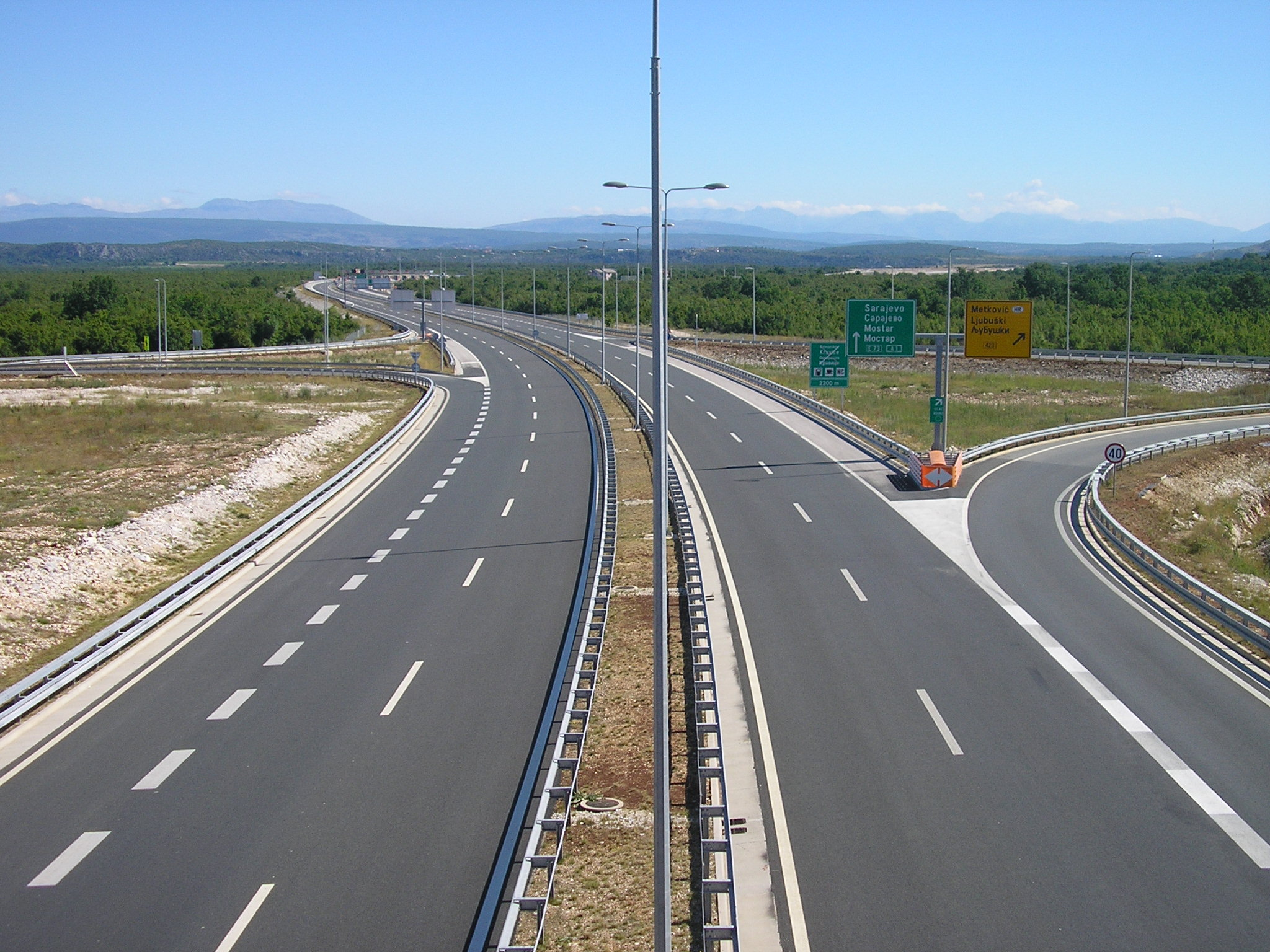
A1 motorway, exit Bijača, towards the Zvirovići interchange

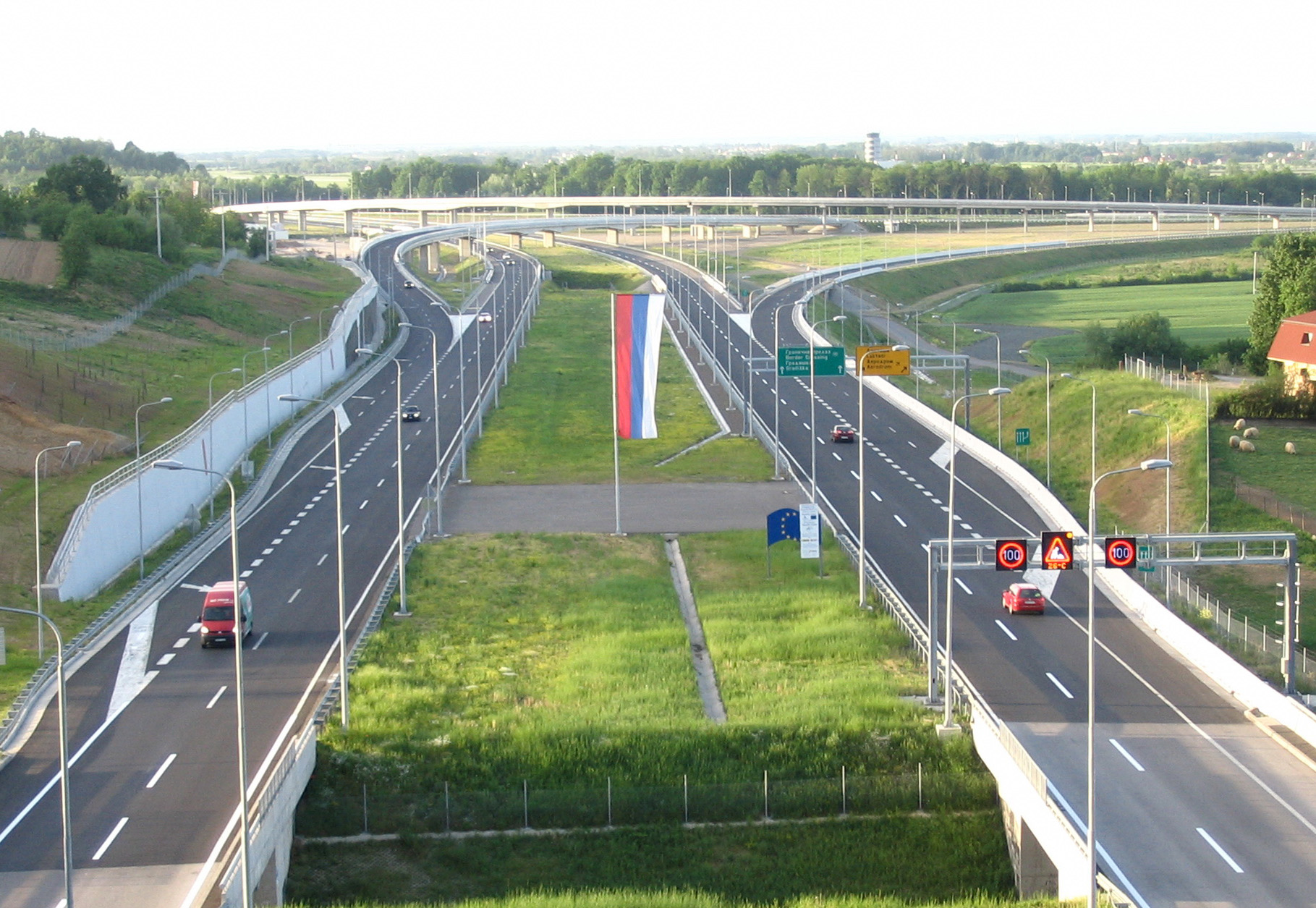
Mahovljanska interchange

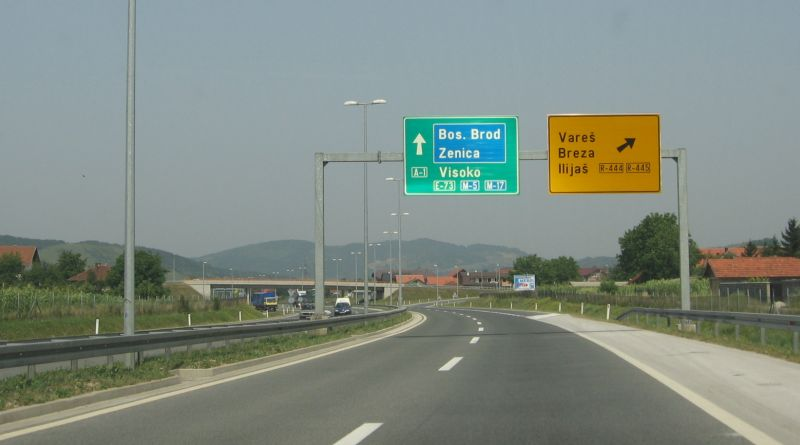
A1 motorway

==== Bulgaria ====

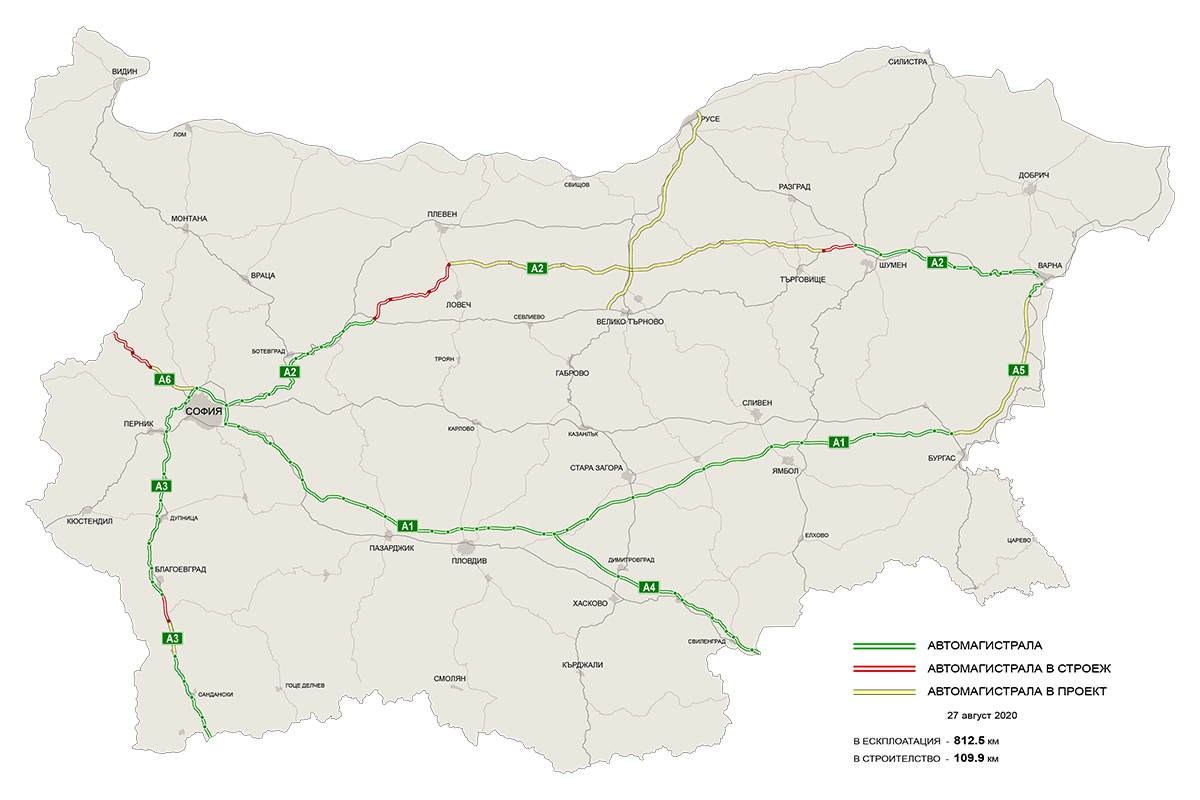
Bulgarian motorway network

Legislation in Bulgaria defines two types of highways: motorways (Aвтомагистрала, Avtomagistrala) and expressways (Скоростен път, Skorosten pat). The main differences are that motorways have emergency lanes and the maximum allowed speed limit is 140 km/h (87 mph), while expressways do not have emergency lanes and the speed limit is 120 km/h (75 mph). As of June 2018, 777 km (483 mi) of motorways are in service, with another 62 km (39 mi) under various stages of construction. More than 590 km (370 mi) are planned. Also, several expressways are planned.

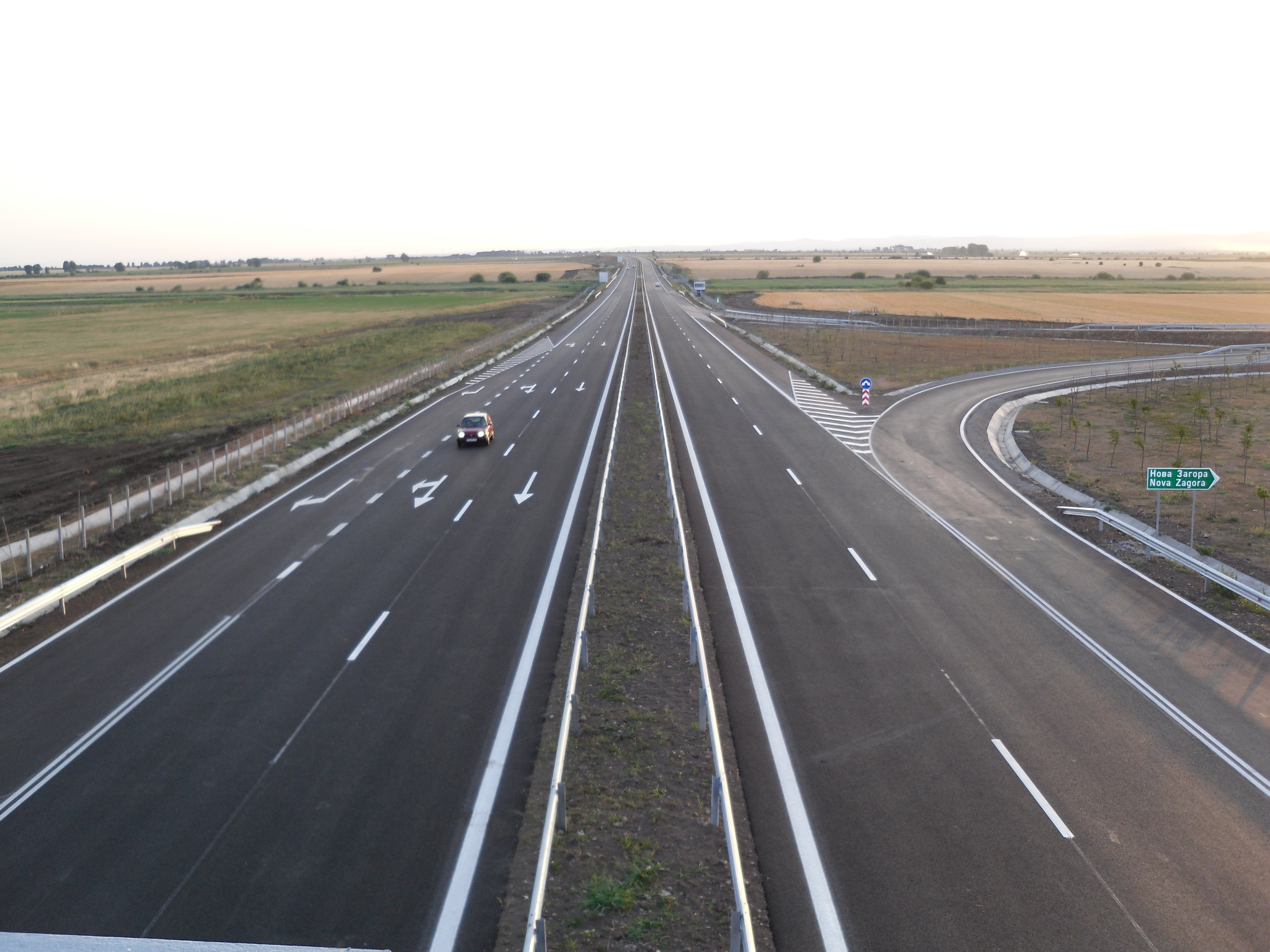
Trakia motorway near Nova Zagora

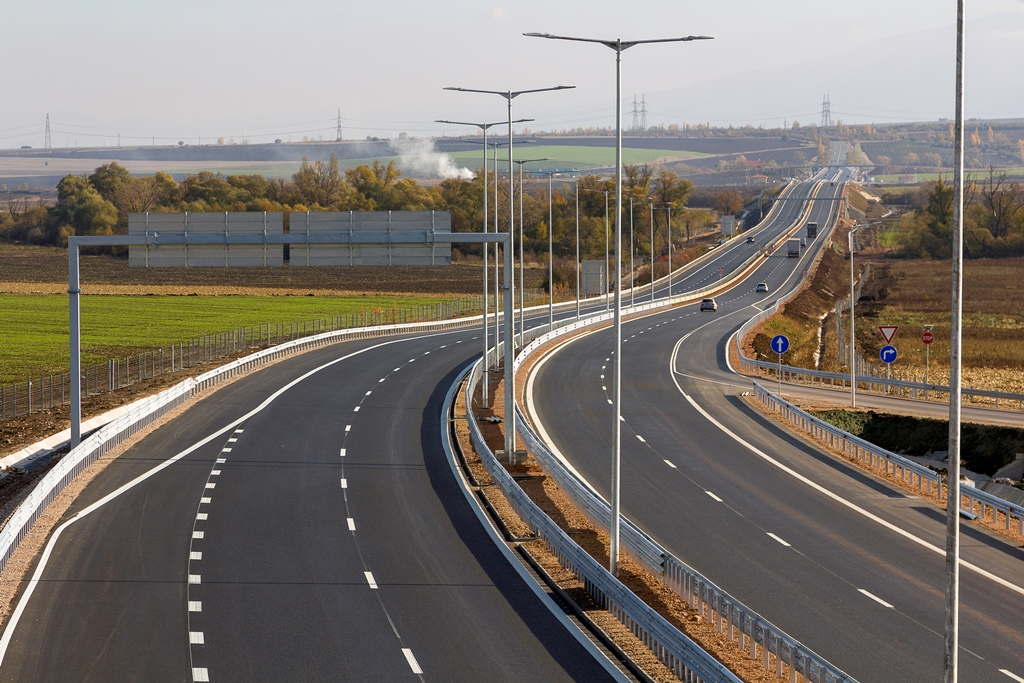
Europe motorway

==== Croatia ====
Sign used denote the start of an Autoroute

Croatian motorway network

The primary high-speed motorways in Croatia are called autoceste (singular: autocesta; Croatian pronunciation: [ˈaʊtotsesta]), and they are defined as roads with at least two lanes in each direction (including hard shoulder) and a speed limit of not less than 80 km/h (50 mph). The typical speed limit is 130 km/h (81 mph). As of 2025, there are 1,360.5 km (845.4 mi) of motorways in Croatia. There is also a category known as brza cesta, meaning "expressway". These roads have a speed limit up to 110 km/h (68 mph) and are not legally required to be grade-separated, but nearly all are.

==== Cyprus ====
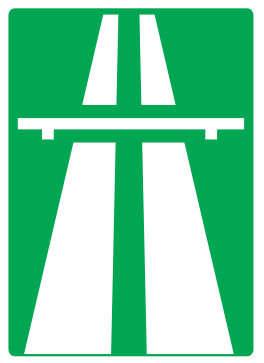

Motorways (Greek: αυτοκινητόδρομος, Turkish: Otoyol) connect all cities in Cyprus, although in the territory under de facto Turkish control these do not meet international standards for the definition of motorways. In the areas administered by the Republic of Cyprus, motorway numbers are prefaced with the letter A, and run from A1 to A6, to distinguish them from all other roads, designated B roads. Of the A roads, all are designated motorways, except for the A4, linking Larnaca with Larnaca Airport.

Motorways are also distinguishable by the use of green-backed road signs, with standard international graphics, and text in yellow in Greek and white in English, distinguishable from B road signage, which has signs with blue backgrounds.

Motorway junctions are theoretically designated with junction numbers, but signage is not consistent is indicating the exit numbers.

==== Czech Republic ====

Czech motorway network

The Czech Republic has currently (2023) 1,363 km (847 mi) of motorways (dálnice) whose speed limit is 130 km/h (81 mph) (or 80 km/h (50 mph) within a town). The total length should be 2,000 km (1,200 mi) around 2030. The number of a motorway (in red) copies the number of the national route (in blue) which has been replaced by the motorway. There are also roads for motorcars (silnice pro motorová vozidla). Those common roads are not subject to a fee (in form of vignette) for vehicles with total weight up to 3.5 t (3.4 long tons; 3.9 short tons) and their speed limit is 110 km/h (68 mph), partially up to 130 km/h (81 mph).

==== Denmark ====

Denmark has a well-covered motorway system today, which has been difficult to build due to the county's geography with many islands. The longest bridges are the Great Belt and the Øresund bridges to Skåne (Scania) in southern Sweden. Both are motorways with dual electrical train tracks added.

==== Finland ====

Motorways in Finland

Finland has 863 km (536 mi) of motorway, which is only a small proportion of the whole highway network. More than half of the length of the motorway network consists of six radial motorways originating in Helsinki, to Kirkkonummi (Länsiväylä), Turku (Vt1/E18), Tampere (Vt3/E12), Tuusula (Kt45), Heinola (Vt4/E75) and Vaalimaa (Vt7/E18). These roads have a total length of 653 km (406 mi). The other motorways are rather short sections close to the biggest cities, often designed to be bypasses. The motorway section on national roads 4 and 29, between Simo and Tornio, is said to be the northernmost motorway in the world.

Finnish motorways do not have a separate road numbering scheme. Instead, they carry national highway numbers. In addition to signposted motorways, there are also some limited-access two-lane expressways, and other grade-separated four-lane expressways (perhaps the most significant example being Ring III near Helsinki).

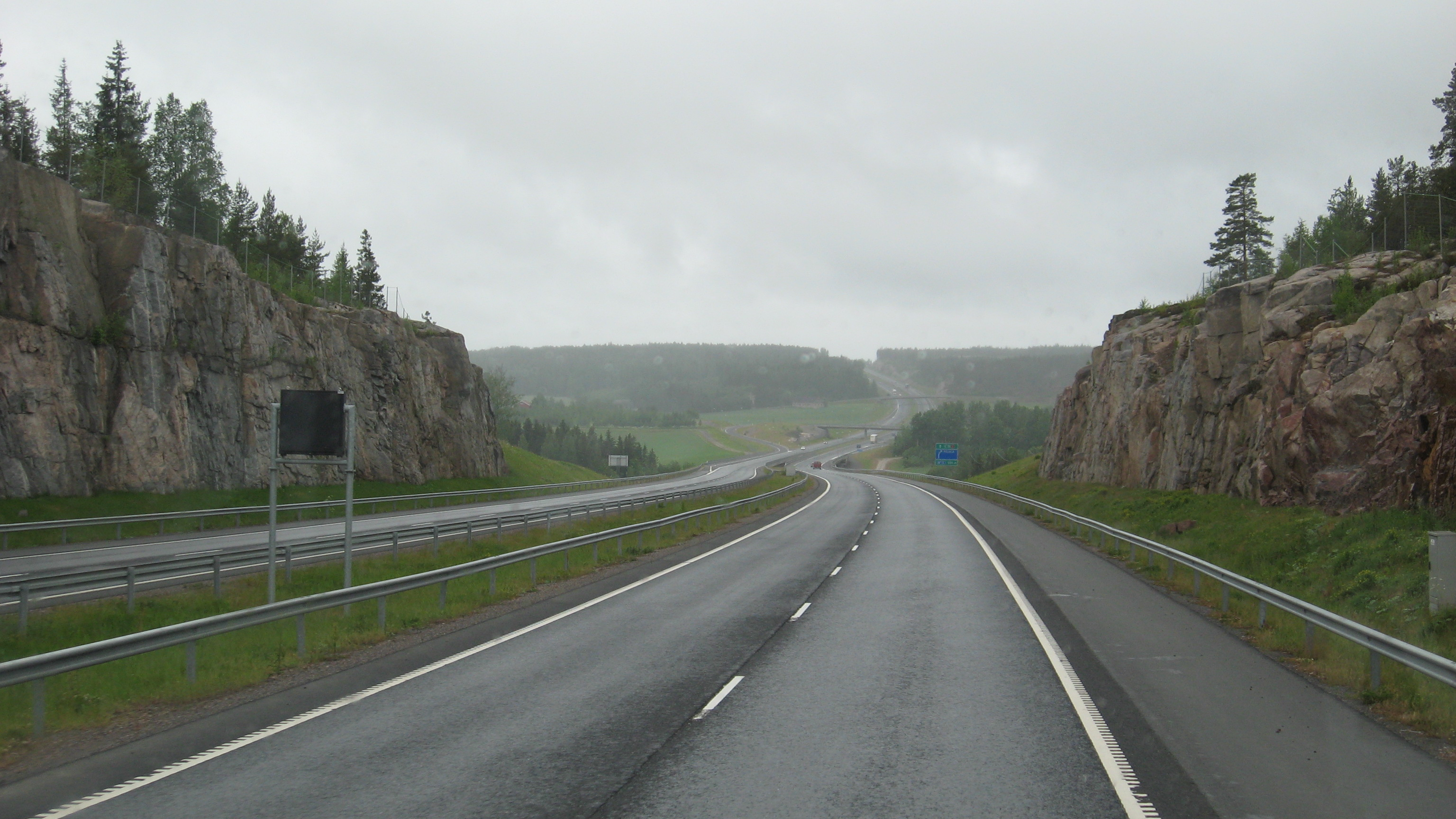
Valtatie 1 near Halikko

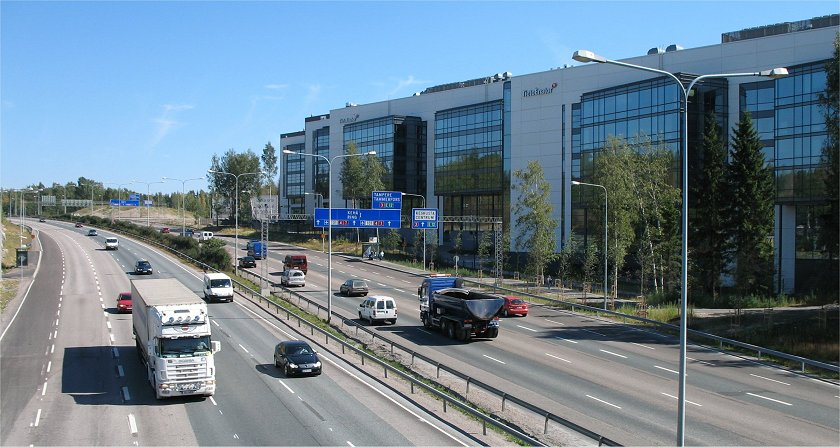
Ring I (Kehä I) in Pohjois-Haaga, a northern district of Helsinki

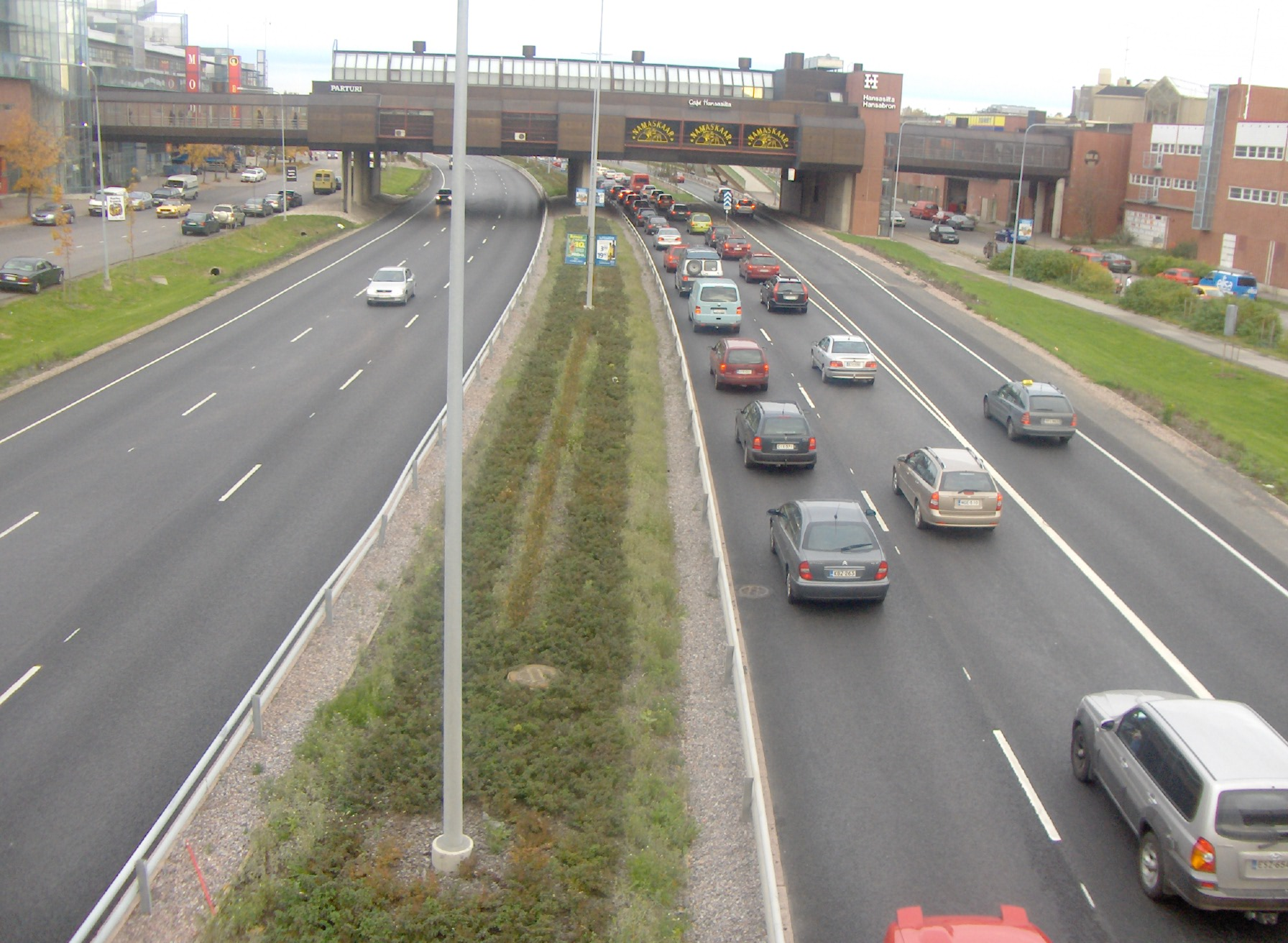
Itäväylä in Itäkeskus, the center of East Helsinki

==== France ====
Sign used denote the start of an Autoroute

Map of French motorways (in yellow) and expressways (in red)

The autoroute system in France consists largely of toll roads, except around large cities and in parts of the north. It is a network of 11,882 km (7,383 mi) worth of motorways. Autoroute destinations are shown in blue, while destinations reached through a combination of autoroutes are shown with an added autoroute logo. Toll autoroutes are signalled with the word péage (toll).

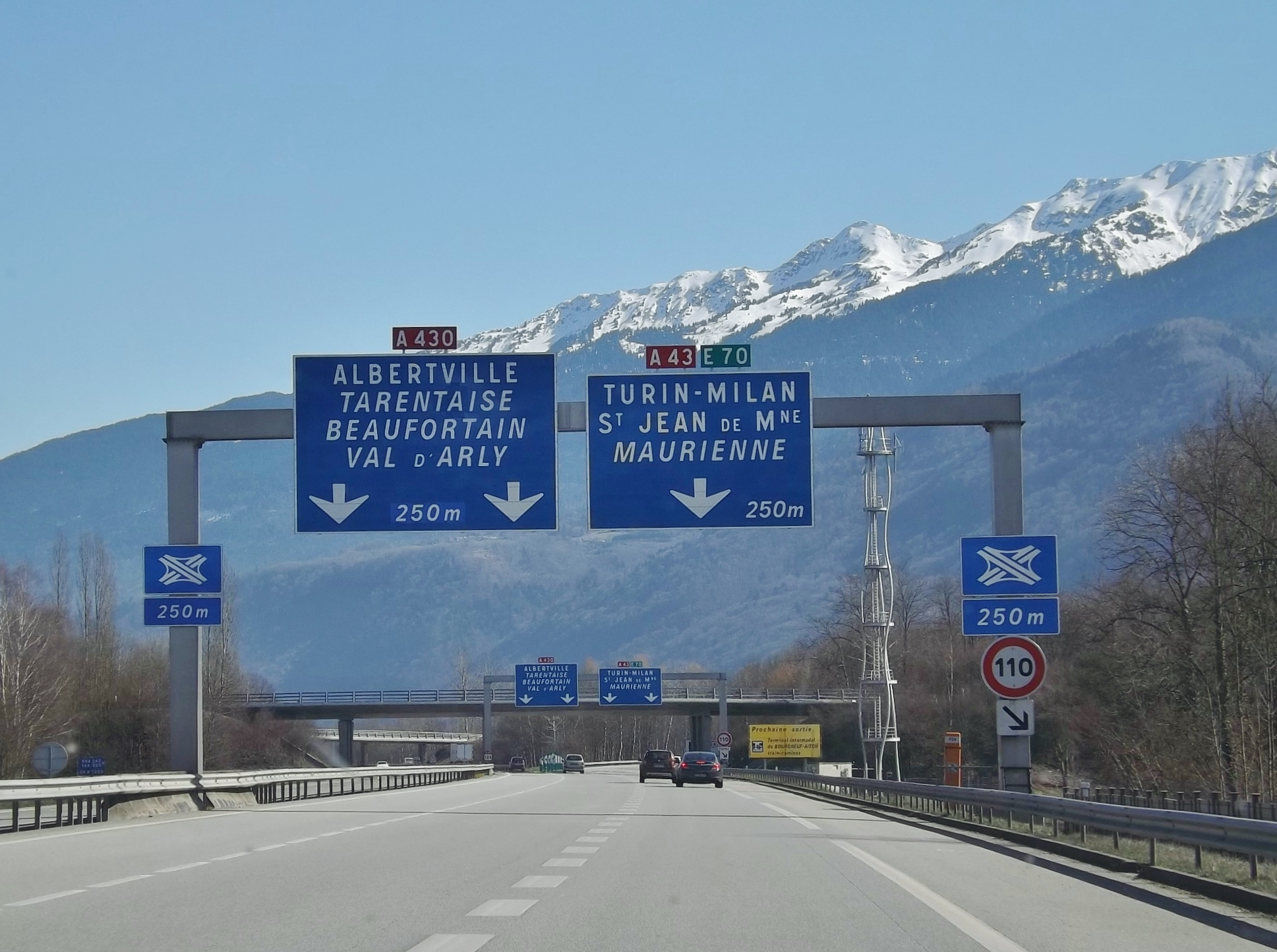
Cross between A430 motorway and A43 motorway

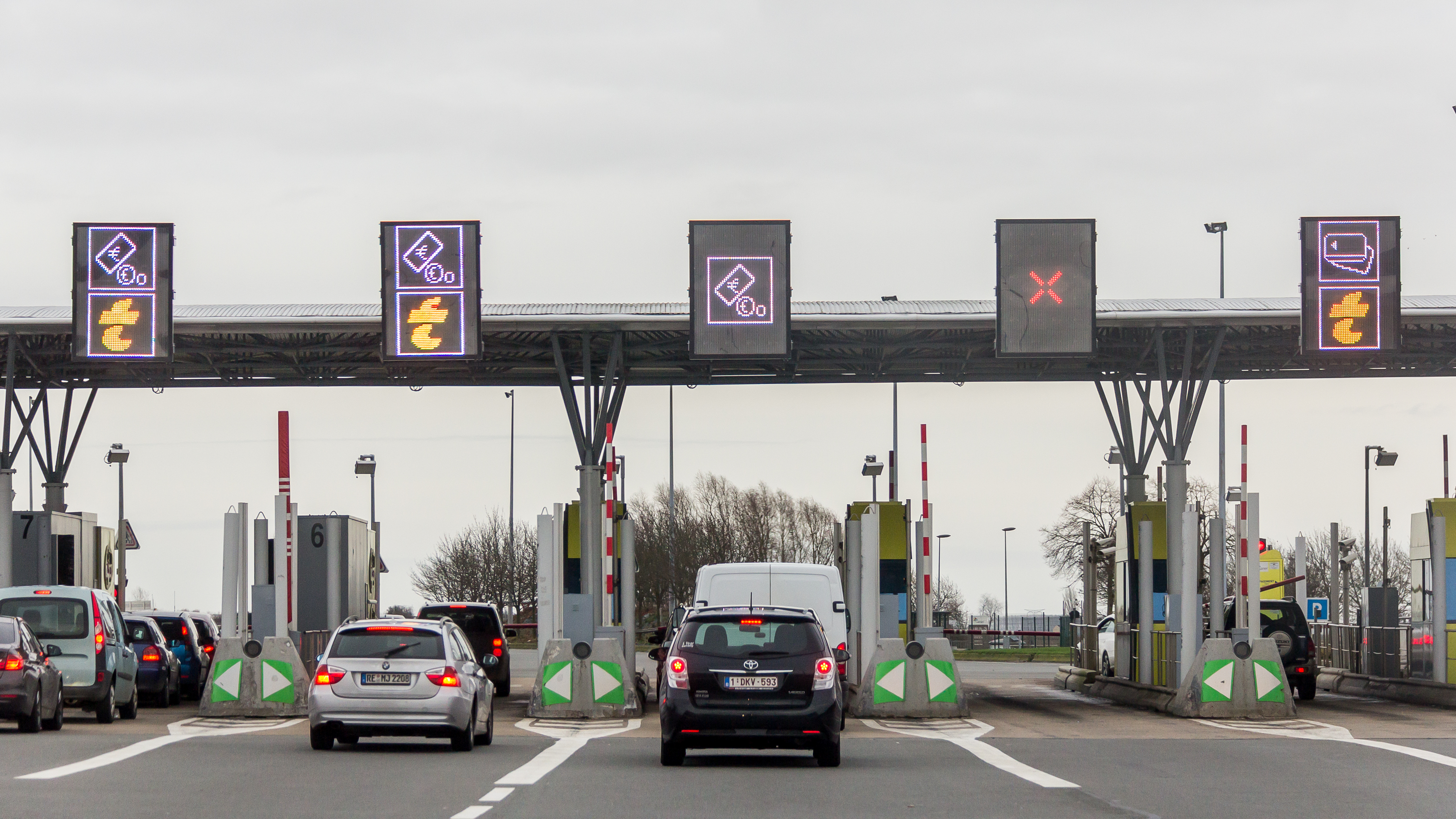
Toll barrier in Hordain (south of Hordain), on autoroute A2

==== Germany ====

German motorways with numbering scheme

Germany's network of controlled-access expressways includes all federal Autobahnen and some parts of Bundesstraßen and usually no Landesstraßen (state highways), Kreisstraßen (district highways) nor Gemeindestraßen (municipal highways). The federal Autobahn network has a total length of 13,183 km (8,192 mi) in 2020, making it one of the densest networks in the world. The German autobahns have no general speed limit for some classes of vehicles (though nearly 30% of the total autobahn network is subject to local and/or conditional limits), but the advisory speed limit (Richtgeschwindigkeit) is 130 km/h (81 mph). The lower class expressways usually have speed limits of 120 km/h (75 mph) or lower.

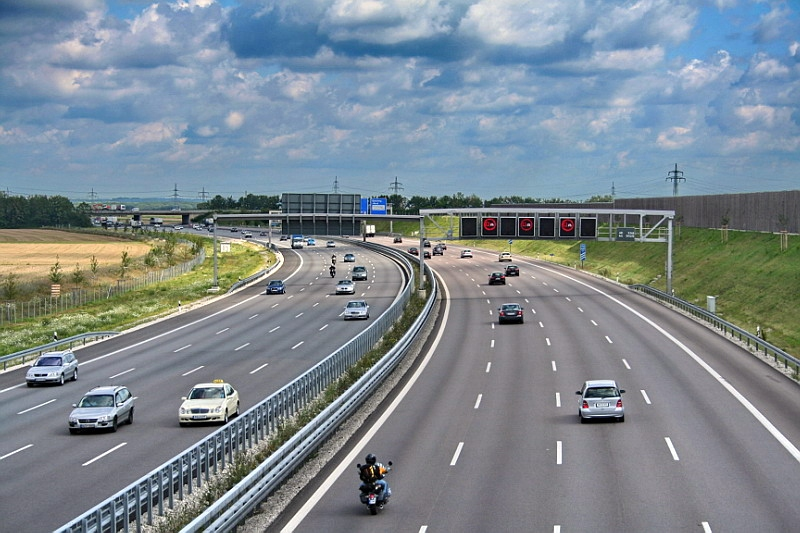
German Motorway (Autobahn) - one of the world's earliest motorways

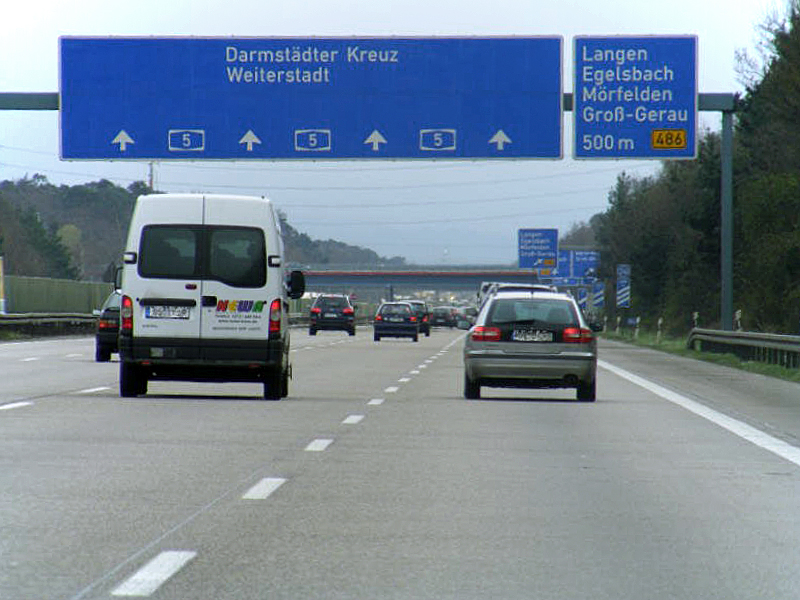
An autobahn with 4 lanes in each direction of travel for 21 km (13 mi). The section between Zeppelinheim and Darmstadt is the oldest Autobahn.

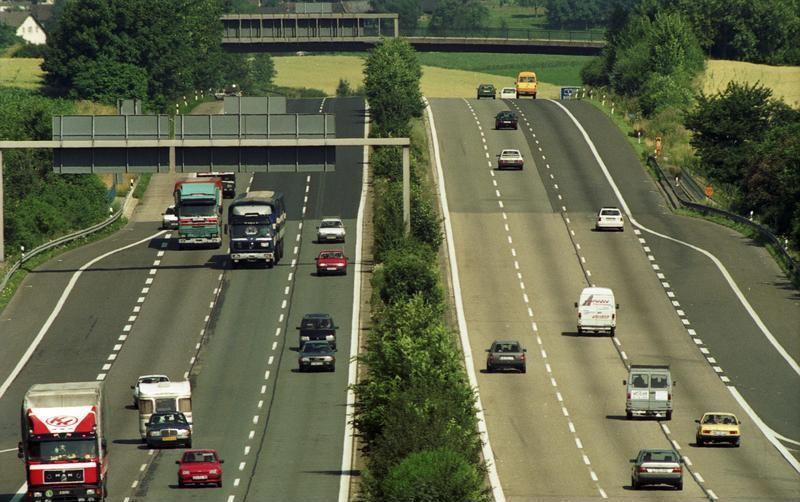
The A 3 in 1991

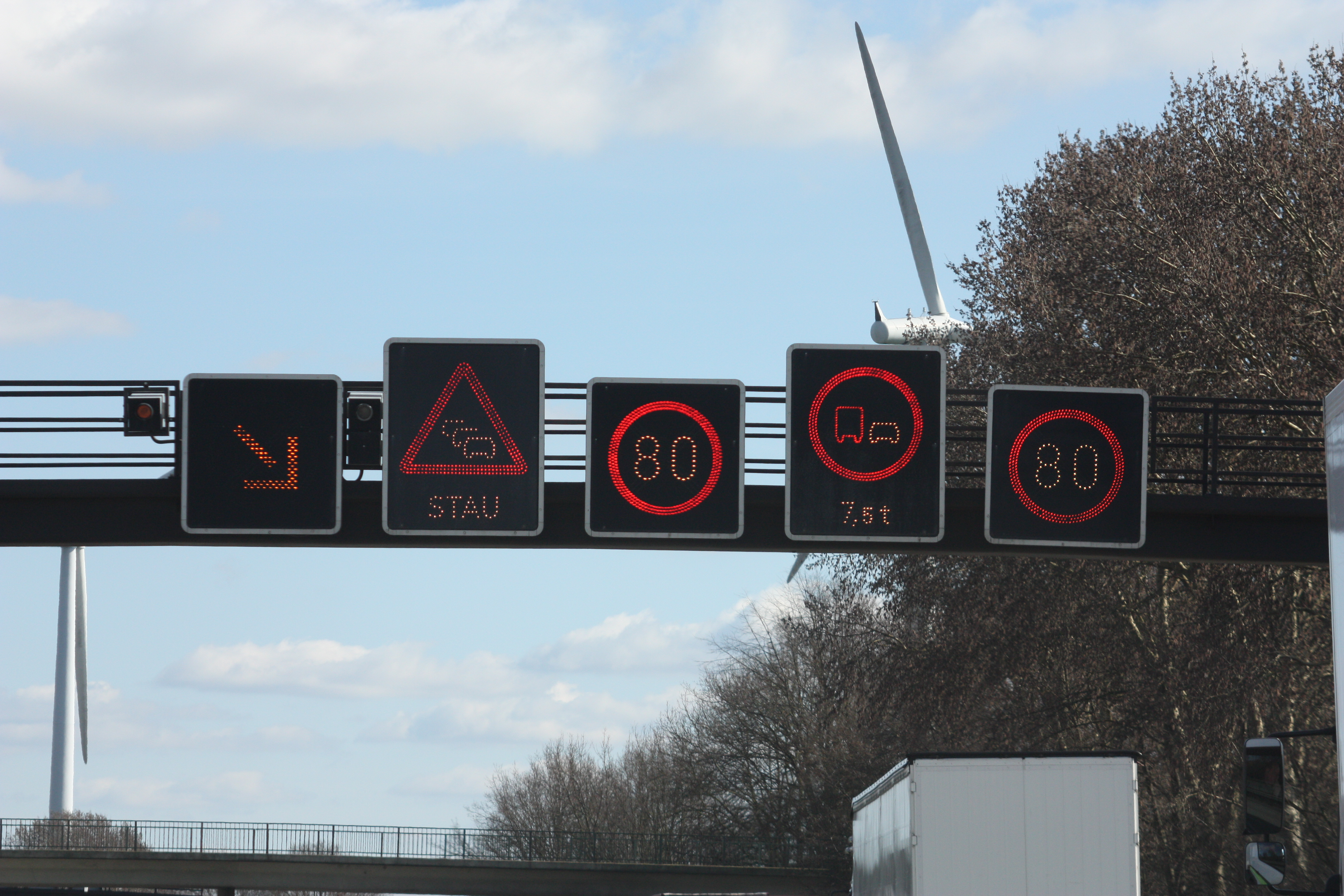
Dynamic traffic signs on an Autobahn

==== Greece ====

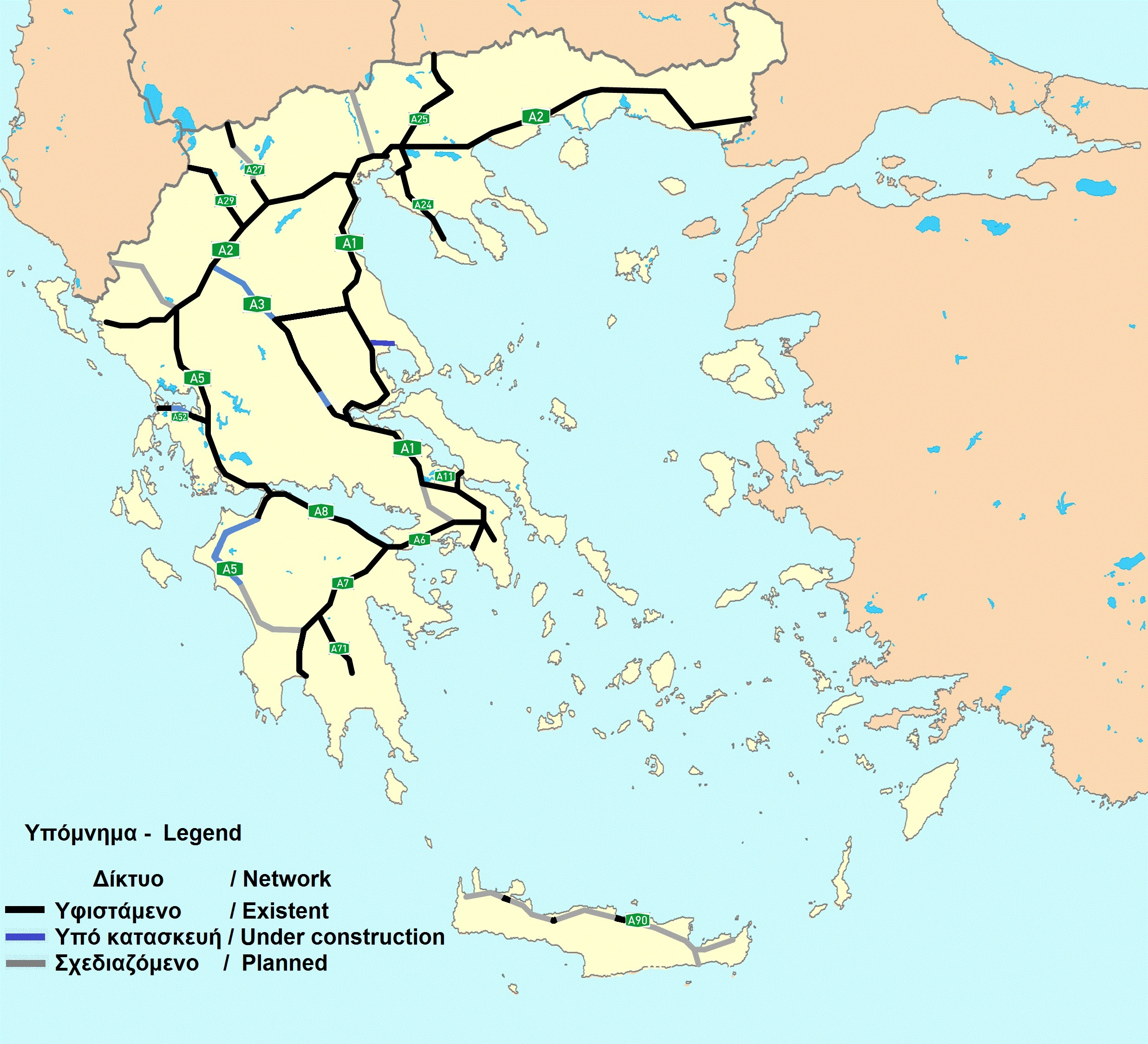
Map of Greece's motorway network

Greece's motorway network has been extensively modernised throughout the 1980s, 1990s and especially the 2000s, while part of it is still under construction. Most of it was completed by mid 2017 numbering around 2,500 km (1,600 mi) of motorways, making it the biggest highway network in Southeastern Europe and the Balkans and one of the most advanced in Europe.

There are a total of 10 main routes throughout the Greek mainland and Crete, from which some feature numerous branches and auxiliary routes. Most important motorways are the A1 Motorway connecting Greece's two largest cities (Athens and Thessaloniki), the A2 motorway (Egnatia Odos), also known as the "horizontal road axis" of Greece, connecting almost all of Northern Greece from west to east and the A8 motorway (Olympia Odos) connecting Athens and Patras. Another important motorway is the A6 motorway (Attiki Odos), the main beltway of the Athens Metropolitan area.

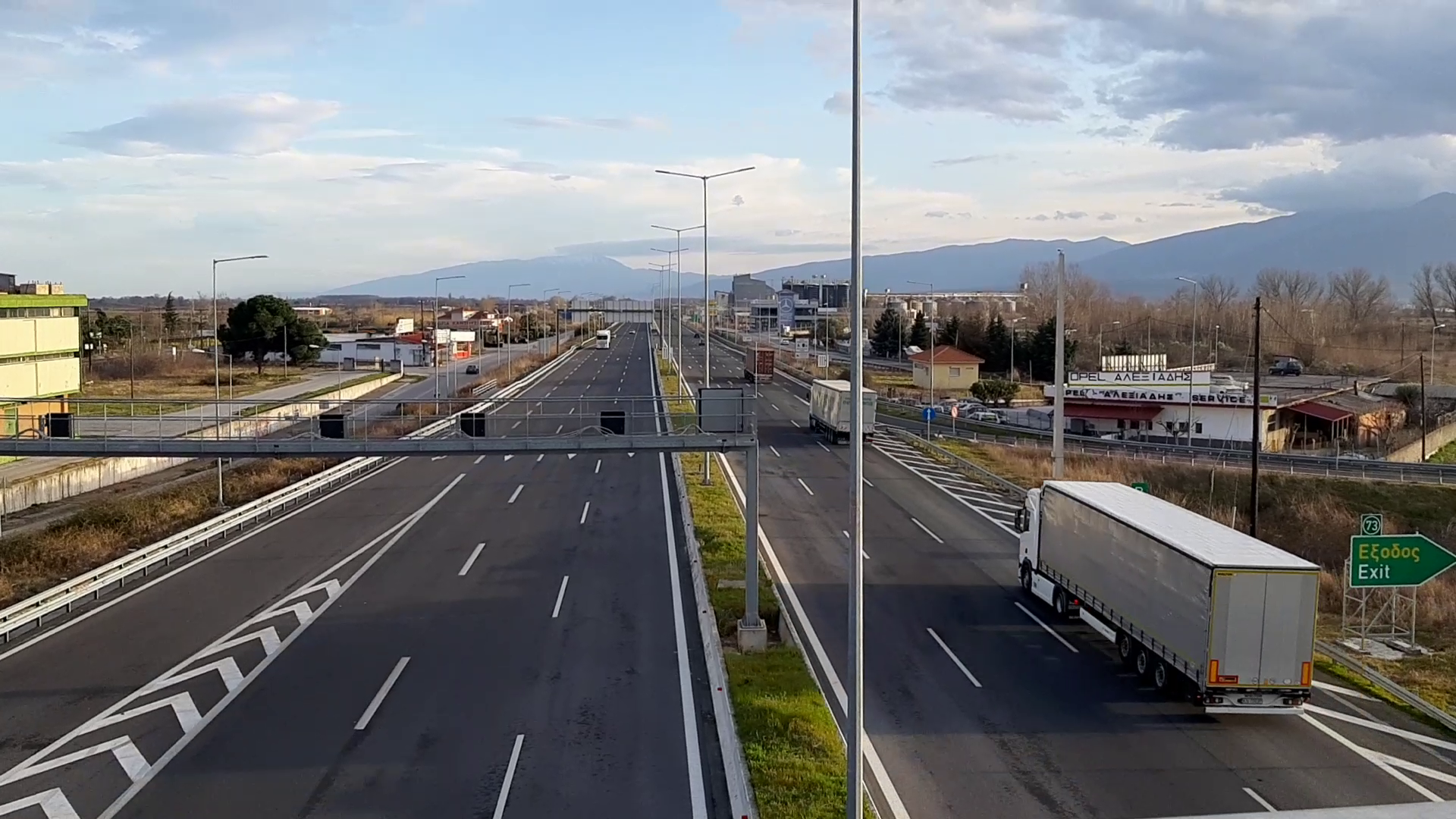
A1 south of Katerini

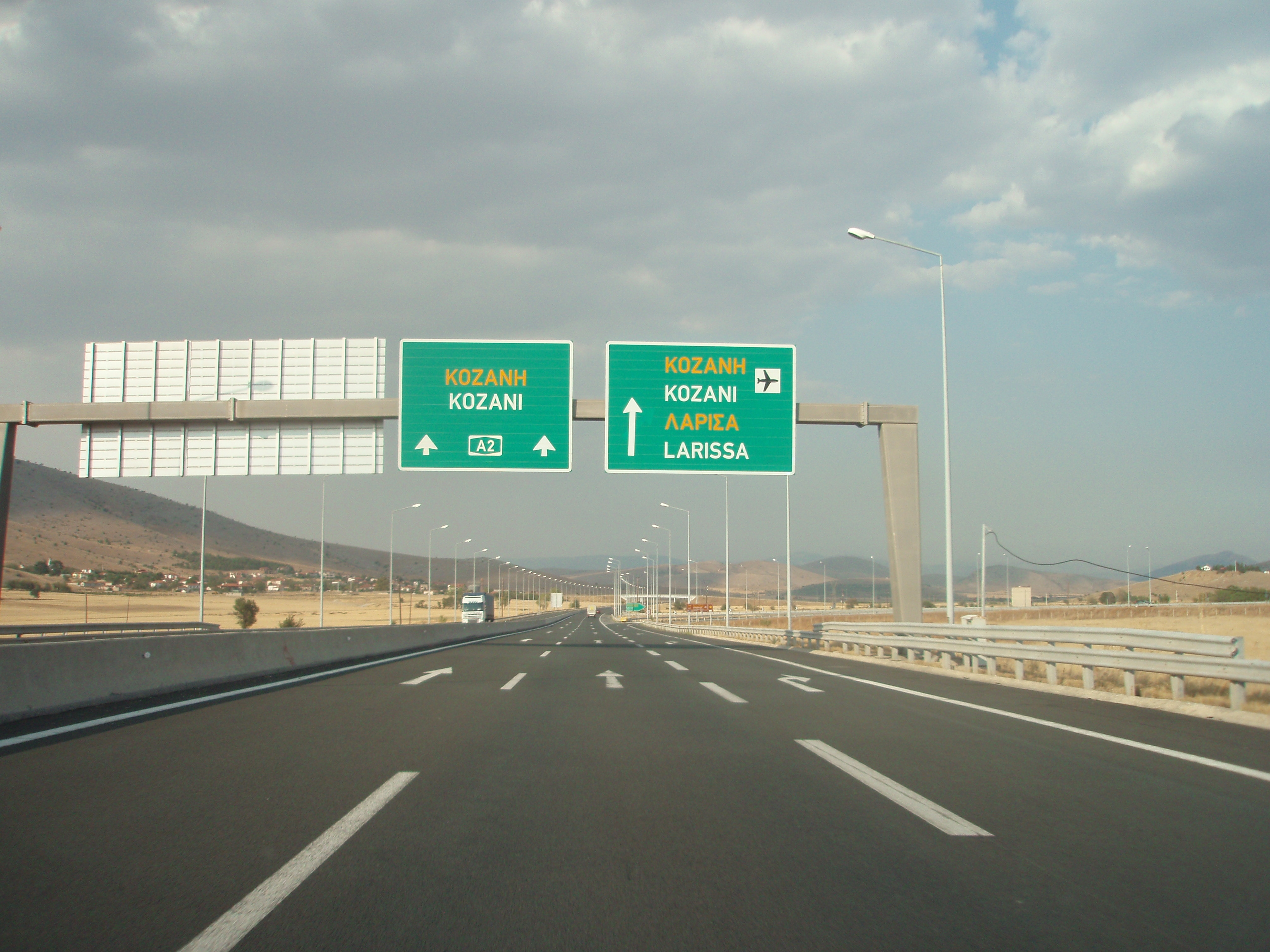
A2 exit near Kozani

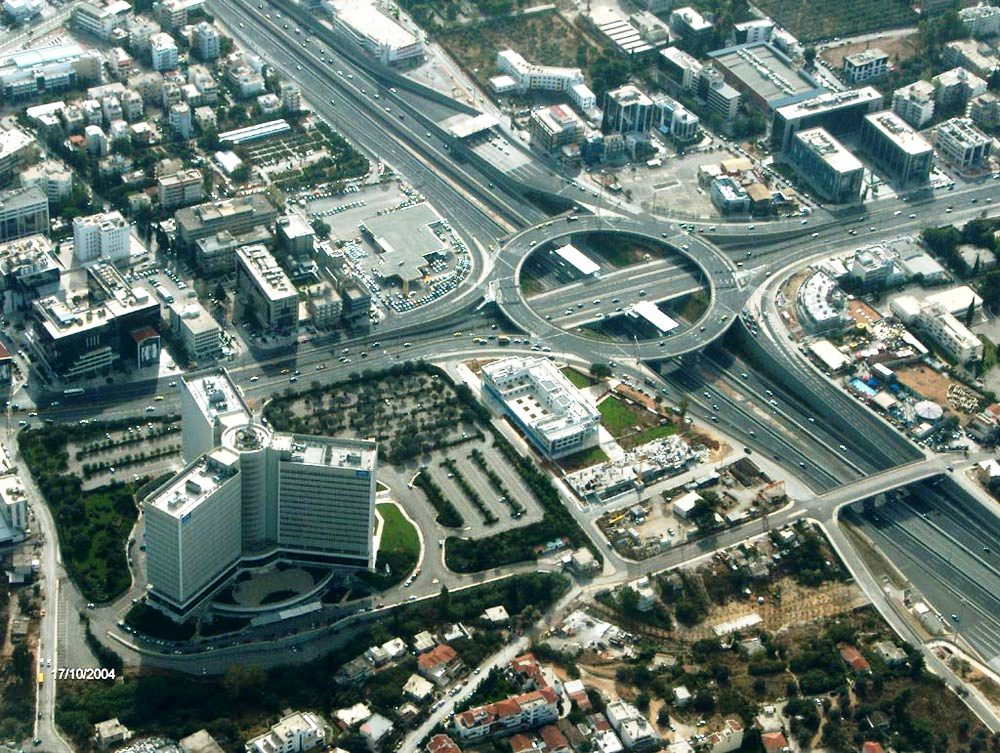
Aerial view of an A6 interchange north of Athens

==== Hungary ====

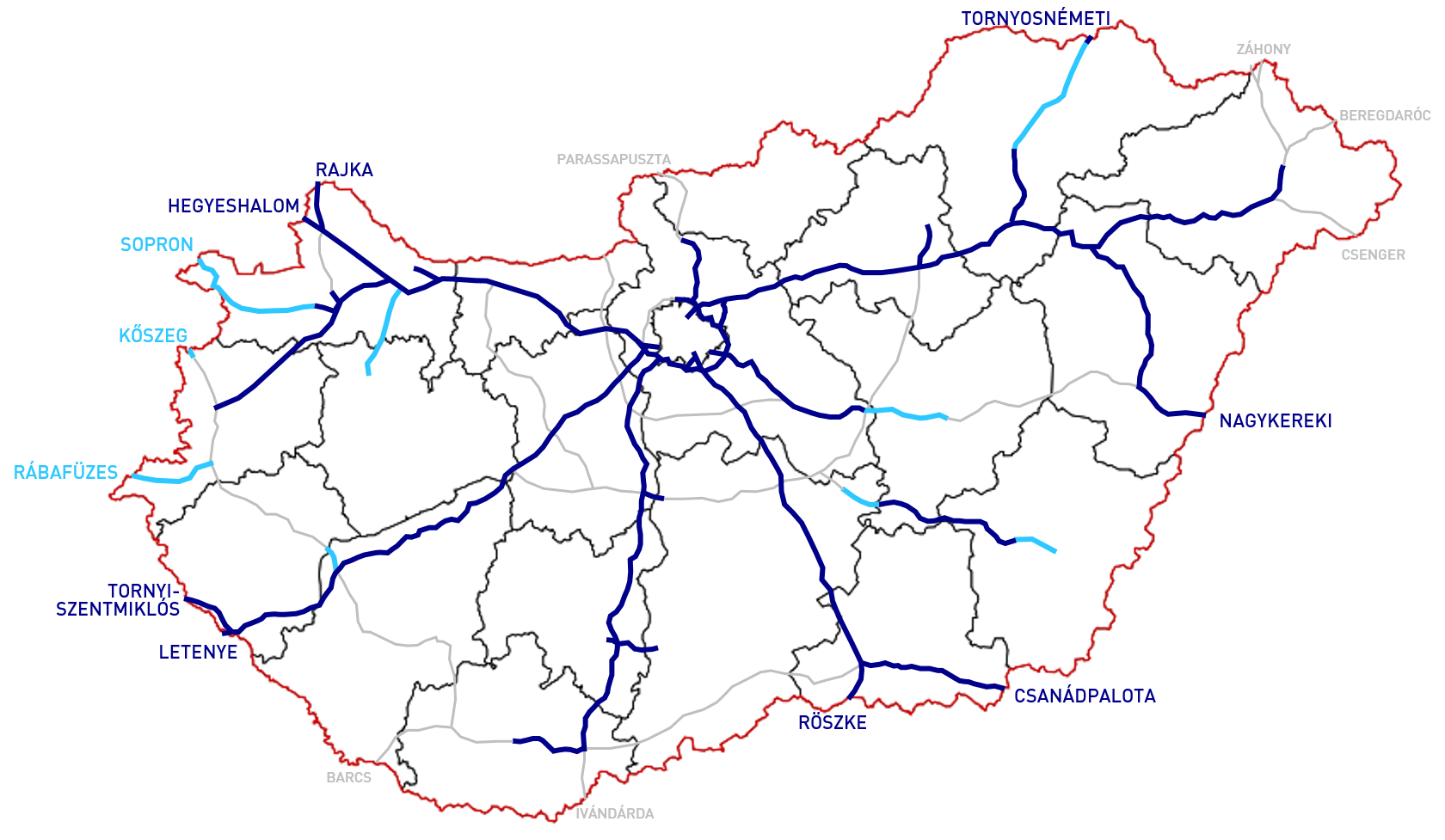
Highways in Hungary. Legend of sections: in use under construction proposed

In Hungary, a controlled-access highway is called an autópálya (plural autópályák).

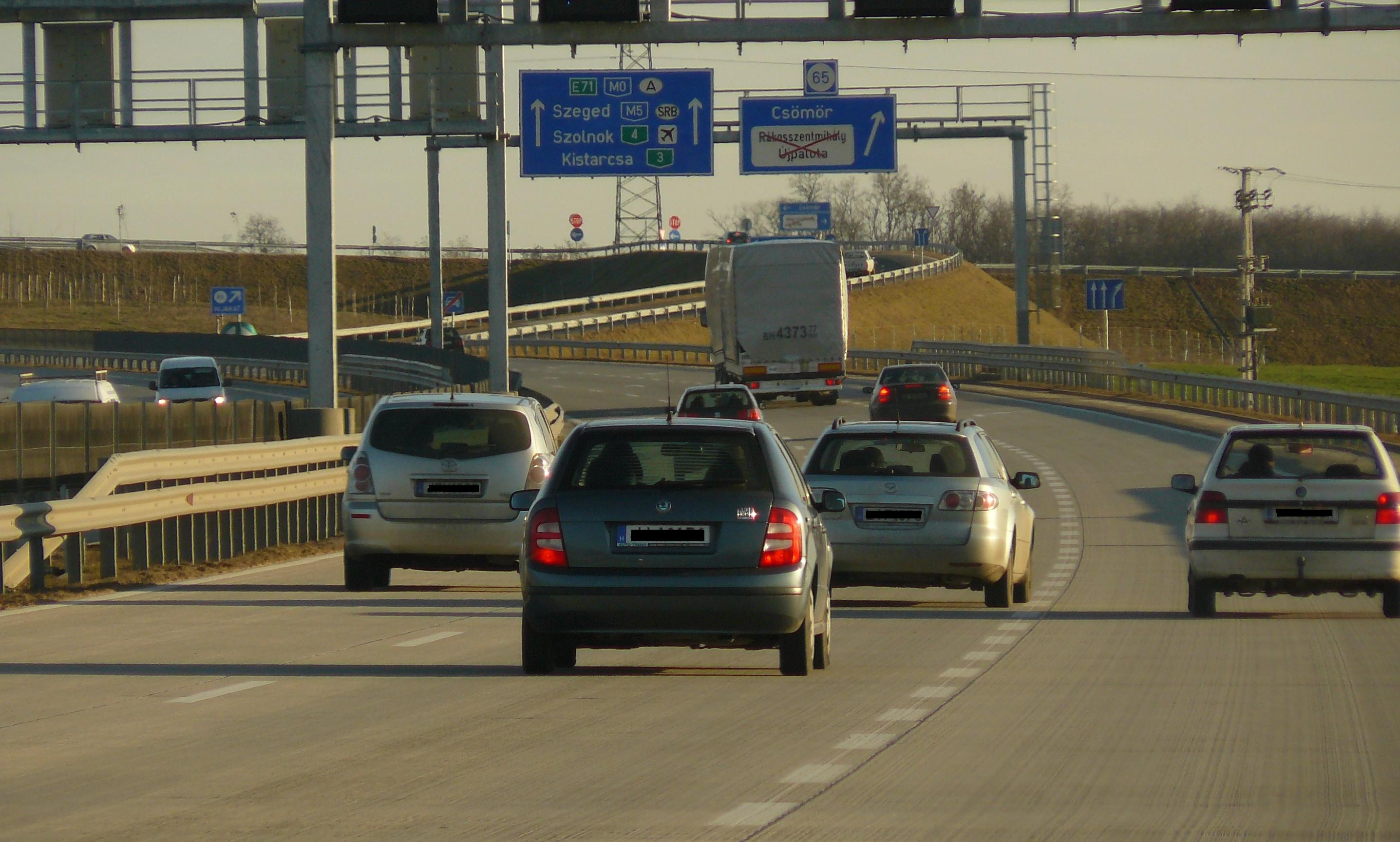
Eastern section of M0

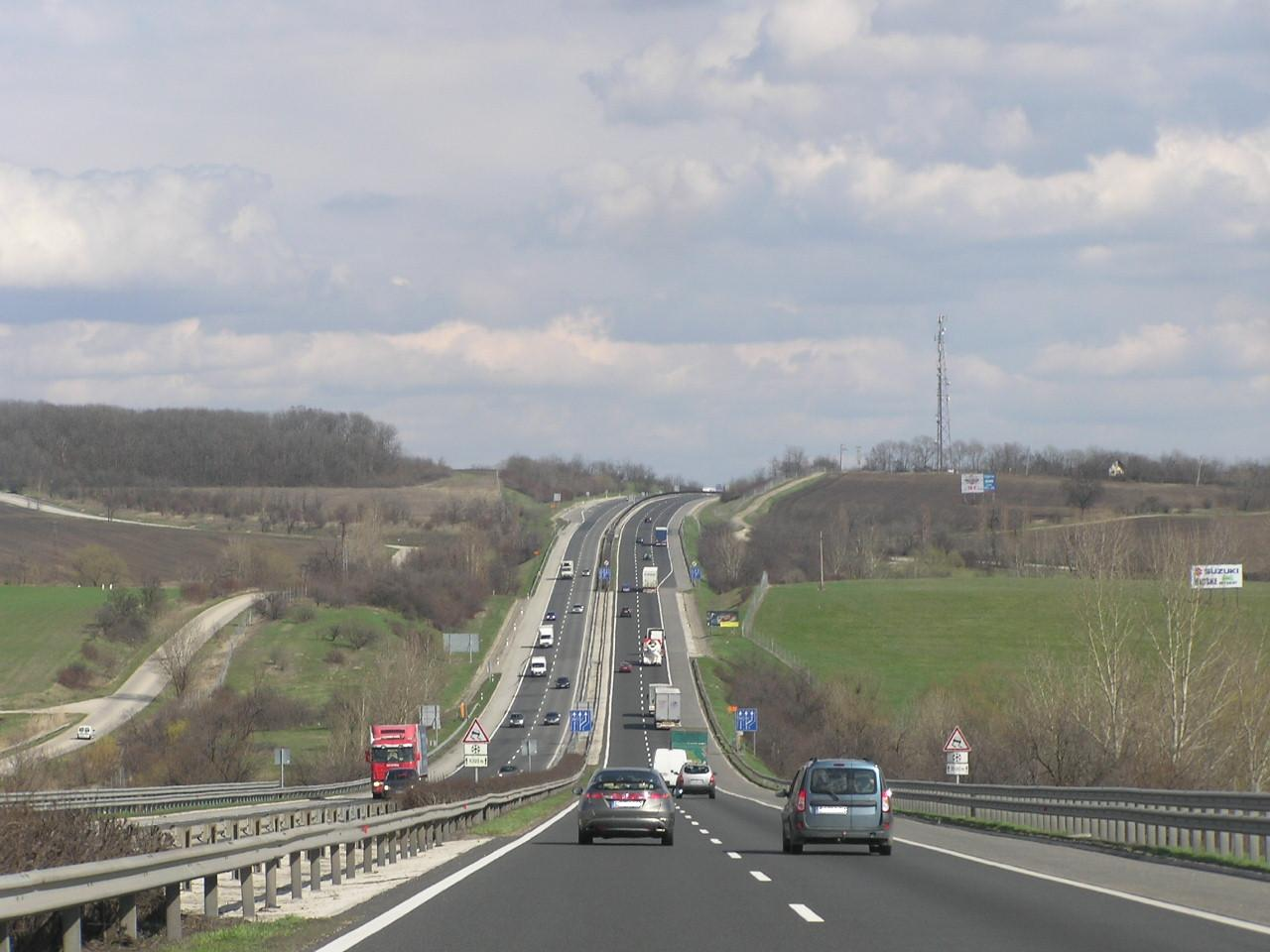
M1 between, Vértes and Gerecse Mountains

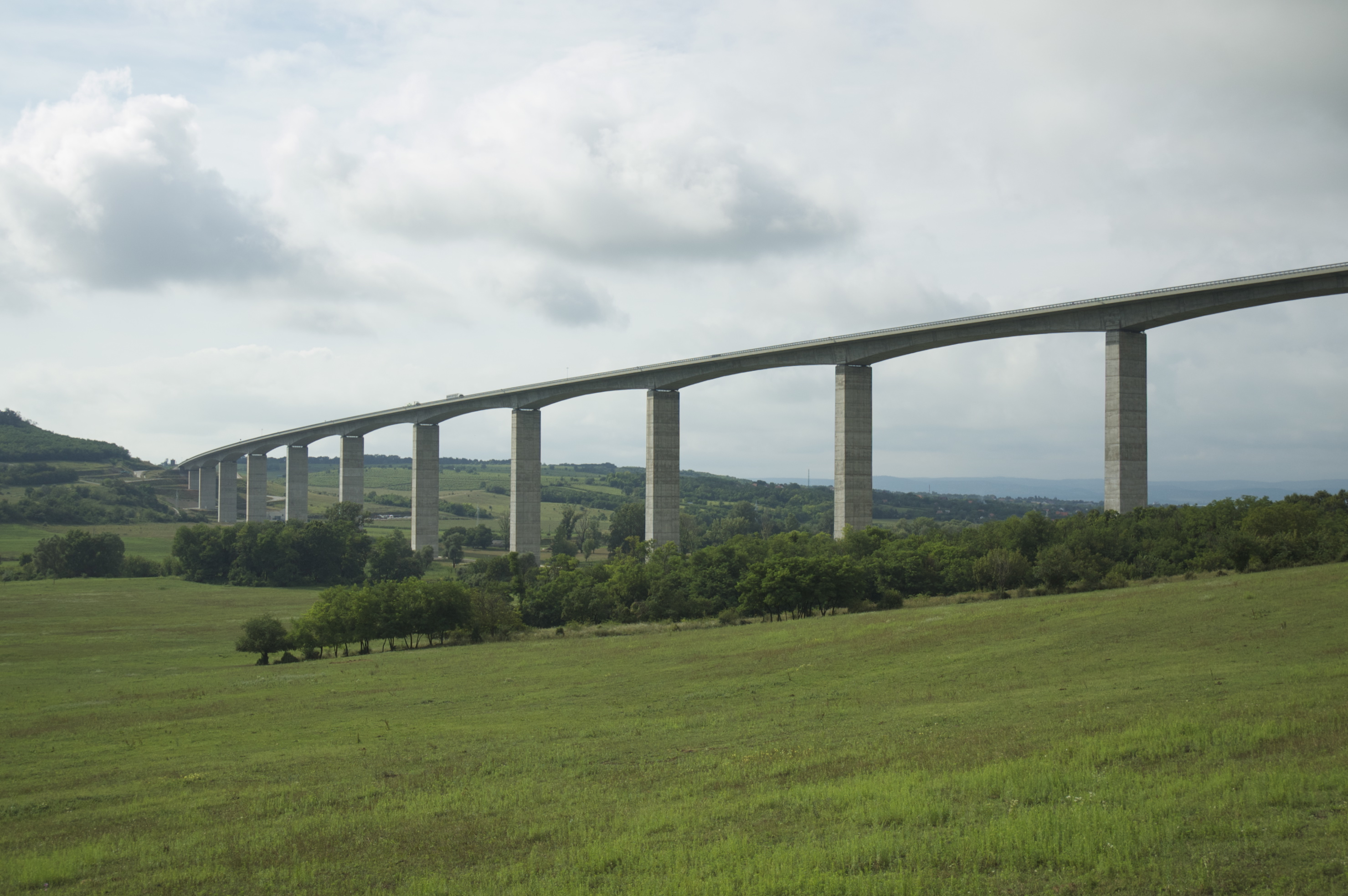
M7 motorway in Köröshegyi völgyhíd

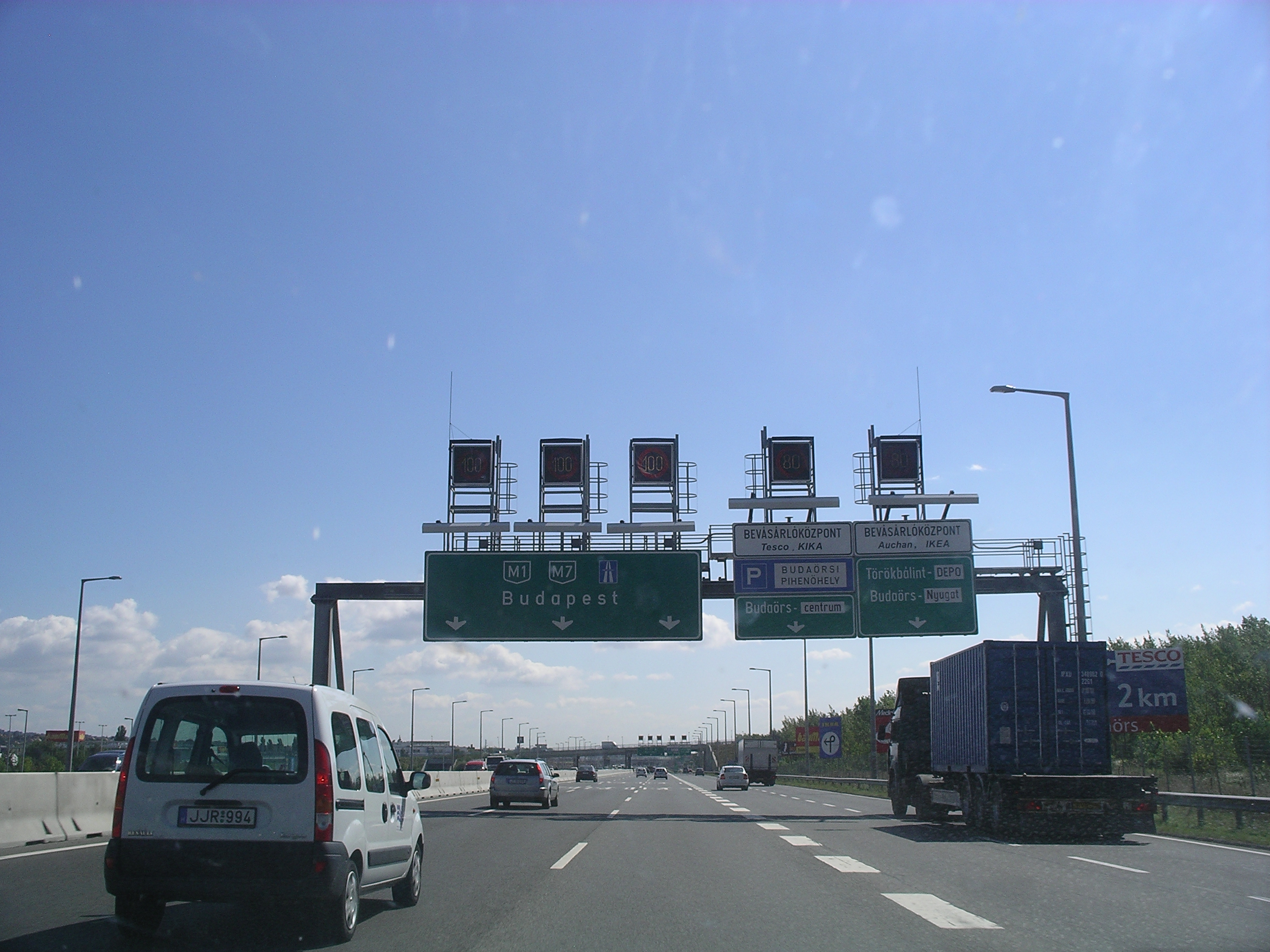
M1 - M7 common phase, near Budapest

==== Ireland ====

In Ireland the Local Government (Roads and Motorways) Act 1974 made motorways possible, although the first section, the M7 Naas Bypass, did not open until 1983. The first section of the M50 opened in 1990, a part of which was Ireland's first toll motorway, the West-Link. However it would be the 1990s before substantial sections of motorway were opened in Ireland, with the first completed motorway—the 83-kilometre (52 mi) M1 motorway—being finished in 2005.

Under the Transport 21 infrastructural plan, motorways or high quality dual carriageways were built between Dublin and the major cities of Cork, Galway, Limerick and Waterford by the end of 2010. Other shorter sections of motorway either have been or will be built on some other main routes. In 2007 legislation (the Roads Bill 2007) was created to allow existing high-quality dual carriageways (HQDCs) to be designated motorways by order because previously legislation allowed only for newly built roads to be designated motorways.

As a result, most HQDCs nationwide (other than some sections near Dublin on the N4 and N7, which did not fully meet motorway standards) were reclassified as motorways. The first stage in this process occurred when all the HQDC schemes open or under construction on the N7 and N8, and between Kinnegad and Athlone on the N6 and Kilcullen and south of Carlow on the N9, were reclassified motorway on 24 September 2008. Further sections of dual carriageway were reclassified in 2009.

As of December 2011, the Republic of Ireland has around 1,017 km (632 mi) of motorways.

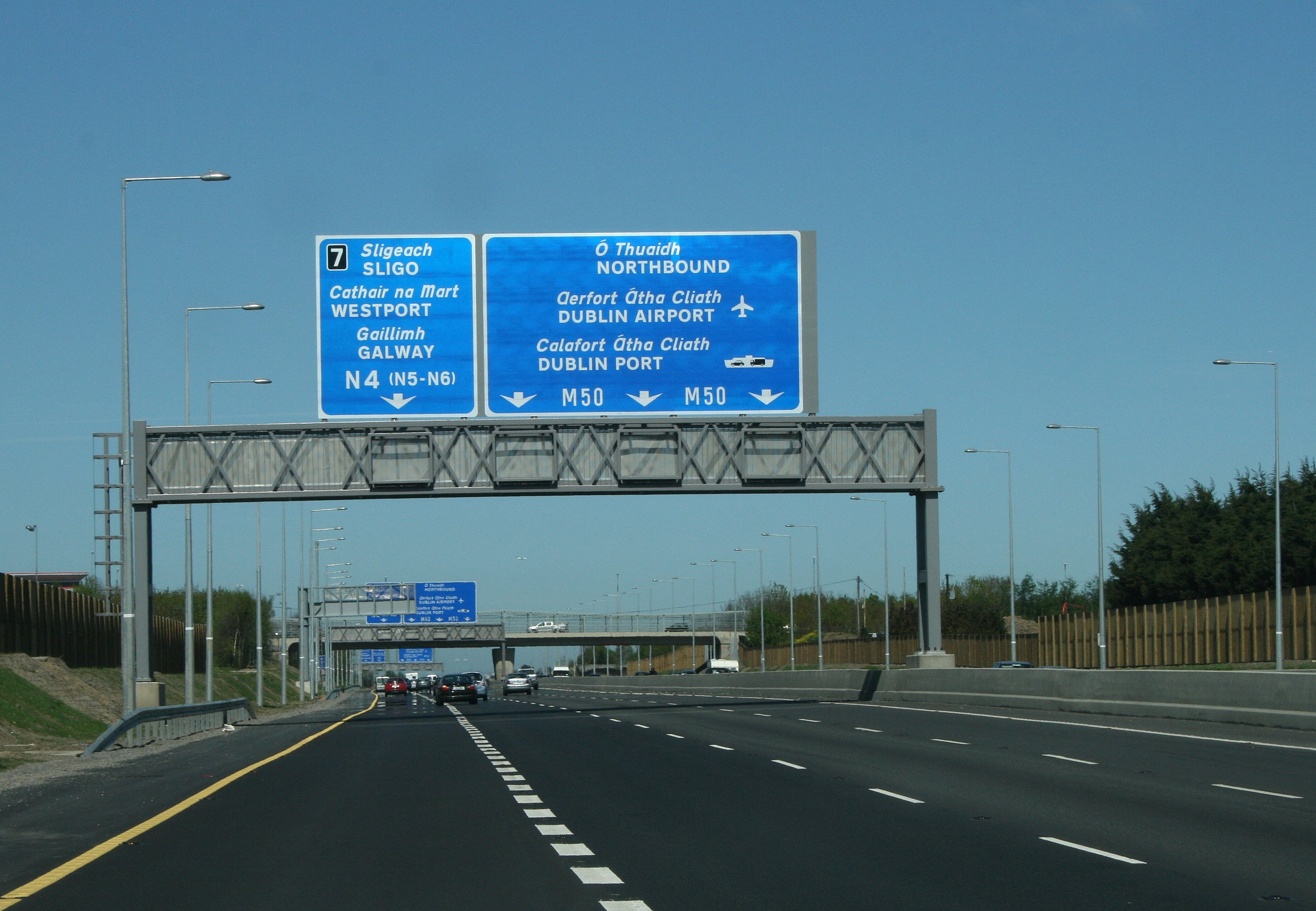
Gantry signage on the M50

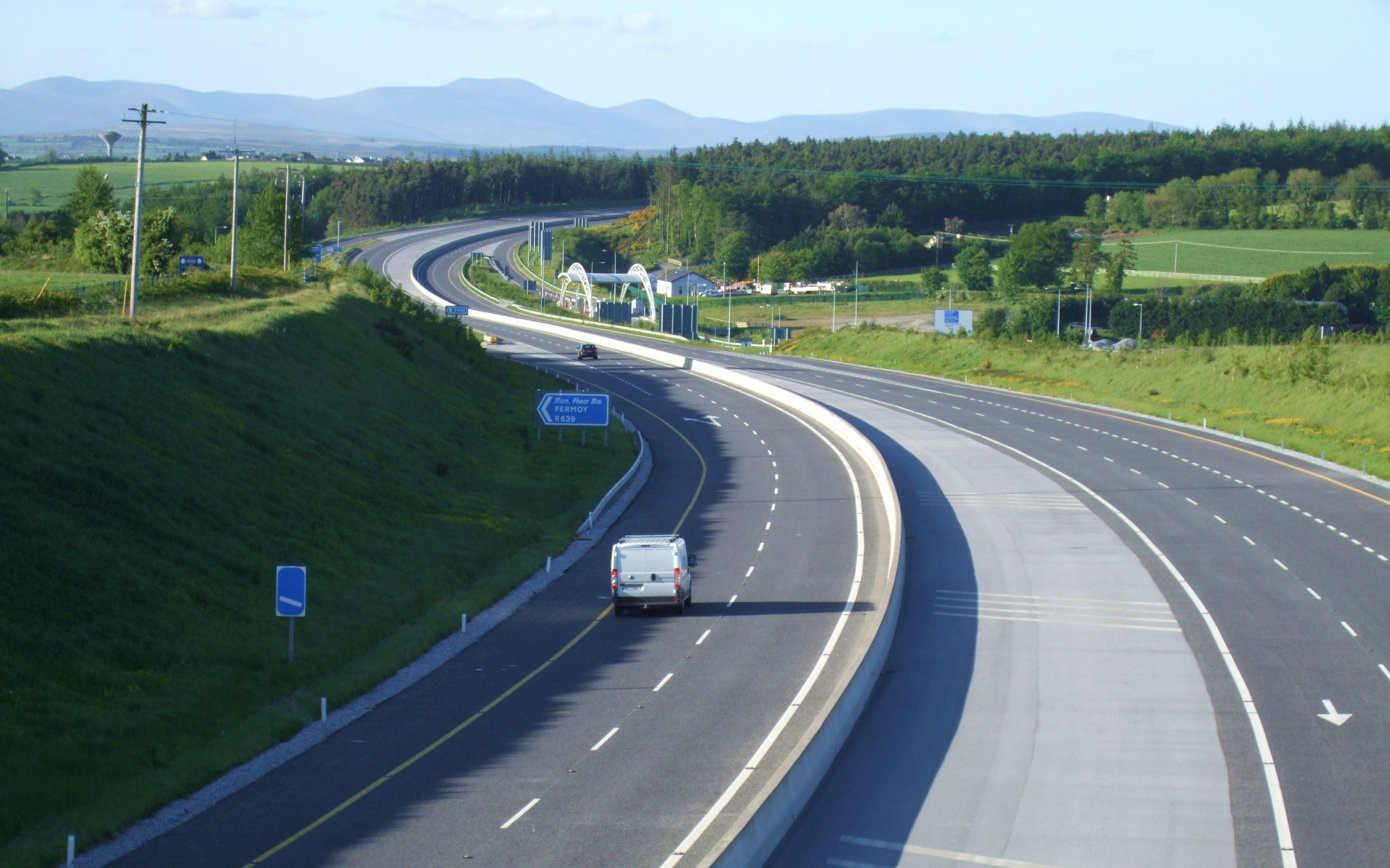
A section of the M8

==== Italy ====

Autostrade (motorways) of Italy

Roads in Italy are an important mode of transport in Italy. The world's first motorway was the Autostrada dei laghi, inaugurated on 21 September 1924 in Italy. It linked Milan to Varese; it was then extended to Como, near the border with Switzerland, inaugurated on 28 June 1925. Piero Puricelli, the engineer who designed this new type of road, decided to cover the expenses by introducing a toll.

Other motorways (or autostrade) built before World War II in Italy were Naples-Pompeii, Florence-Pisa, Padua-Venice, Milan-Turin, Milan-Bergamo-Brescia and Rome-Ostia. The total length of the Italian motorway system is about 7,016 kilometres (4,360 mi), as of 30 July 2022. To these data are added 13 motorway spur routes, which extend for 355 kilometres (221 mi). The density is 22.4 kilometres (13.9 mi) of motorway for every 1,000 square kilometres (390 sq mi) of Italian territory.

Italian motorways (or autostrade) are mostly managed by concessionaire companies. From 1 October 2012 the granting body is the Ministry of Infrastructure and Transport and no longer Anas and the majority (5,773.4 kilometres (3,587.4 mi) in 2009) are subject to toll payments. On Italian motorways, the toll applies to almost all motorways not managed by Anas. The collection of motorway tolls, from a tariff point of view, is managed mainly in two ways: either through the "closed motorway system" (km travelled) or through the "open motorway system" (flat-rate toll).

Italy's motorways (or autostrade) have a standard speed limit of 130 km/h (80 mph) for cars. Limits for other vehicles (or when visibility is poor due to weather) are lower. Legal provisions allow operators to set the limit to 150 km/h (95 mph) on their concessions on a voluntary basis if there are three lanes in each direction and a working SICVE, or Safety Tutor, which is a speed-camera system that measures the average speed over a given distance.

Type B highway (Italian: strada extraurbana principale), commonly but unofficially known as superstrada (Italian equivalent for expressway), is a divided highway with at least two lanes in each direction, paved shoulder on the right, no cross-traffic and no at-grade intersections. Access restrictions on such highways are exactly the same as motorways (or autostrade). The signage at the beginning and the end of the strade extraurbane principali is the same, except the background colour is blue instead of green. The general speed limit on strade extraurbane principali is 110 km/h (70 mph), unless otherwise indicated. Strade extraurbane principali are not tolled.

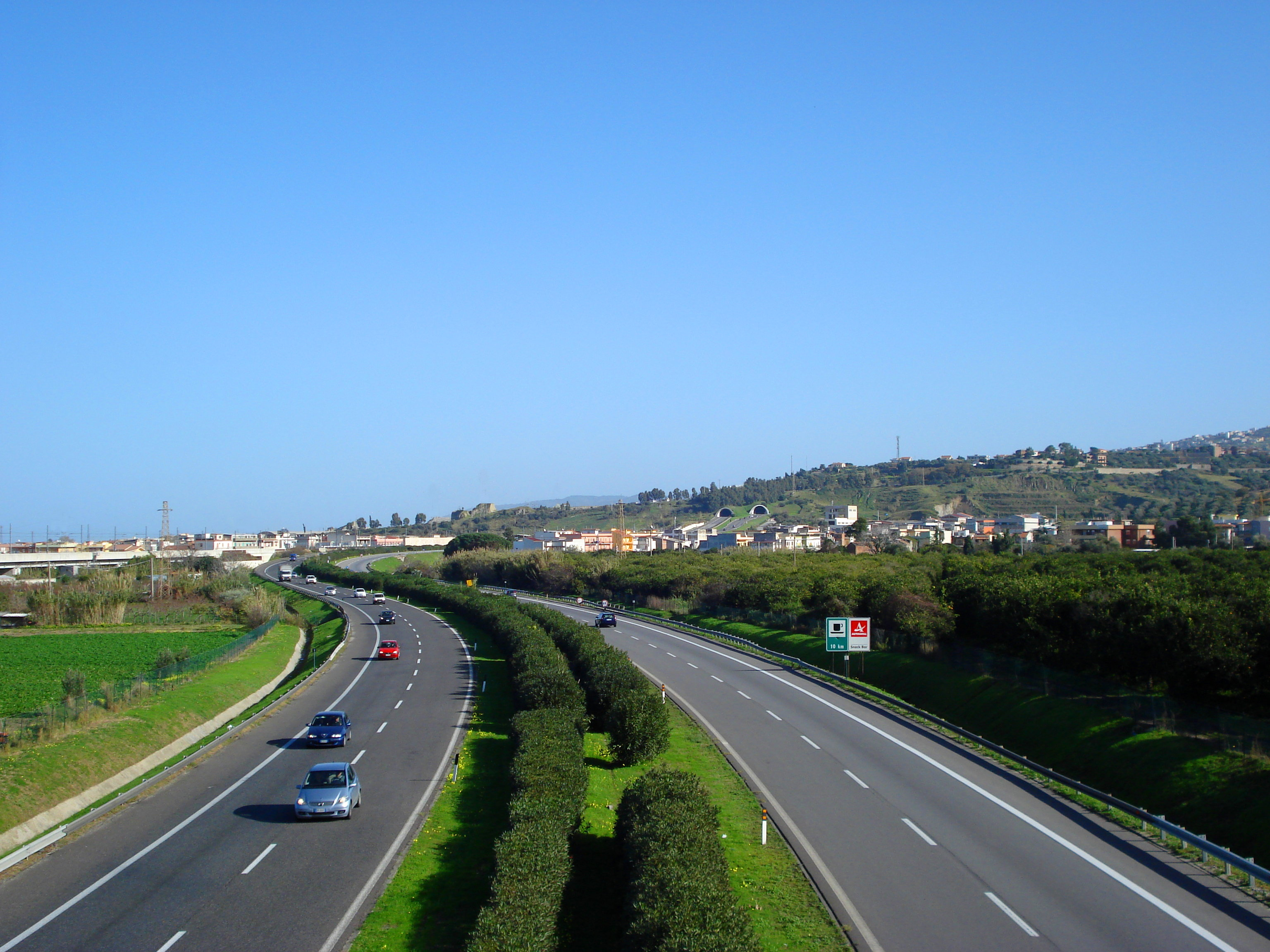
Autostrada A20 runs through the island of Sicily linking Palermo to Messina

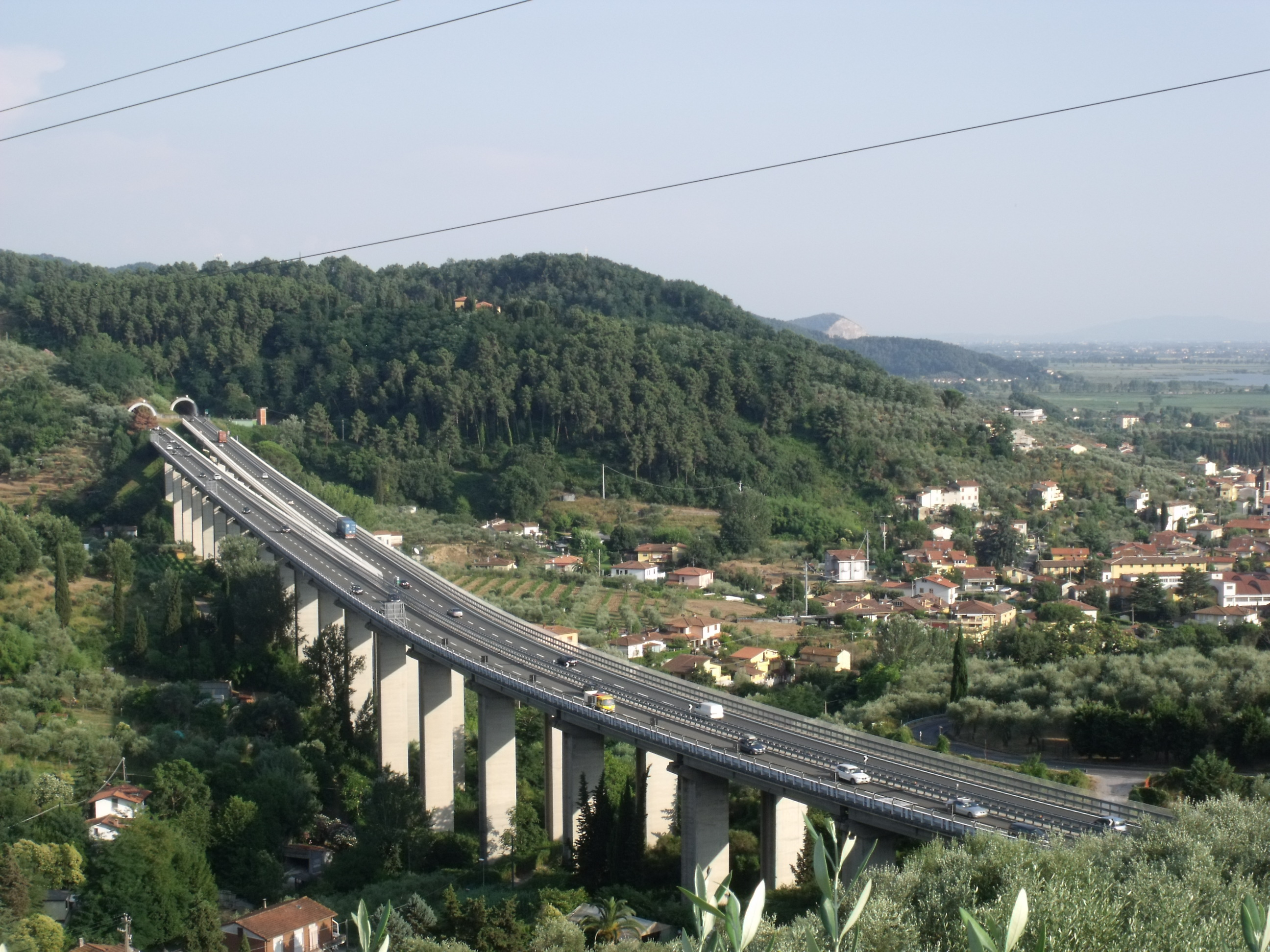
Autostrada A11 runs through Tuscany linking Florence to Pisa

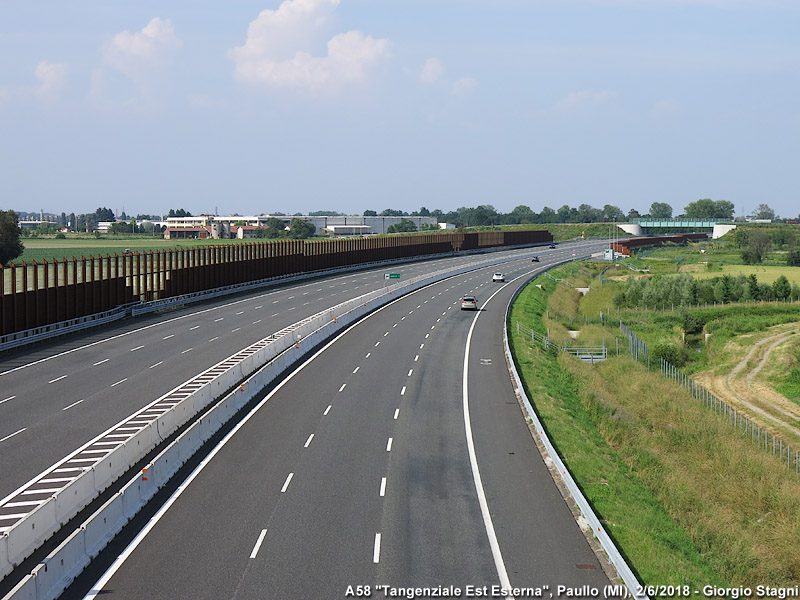
Autostrada A58 is the second ring road east of Milan after the Autostrada A51

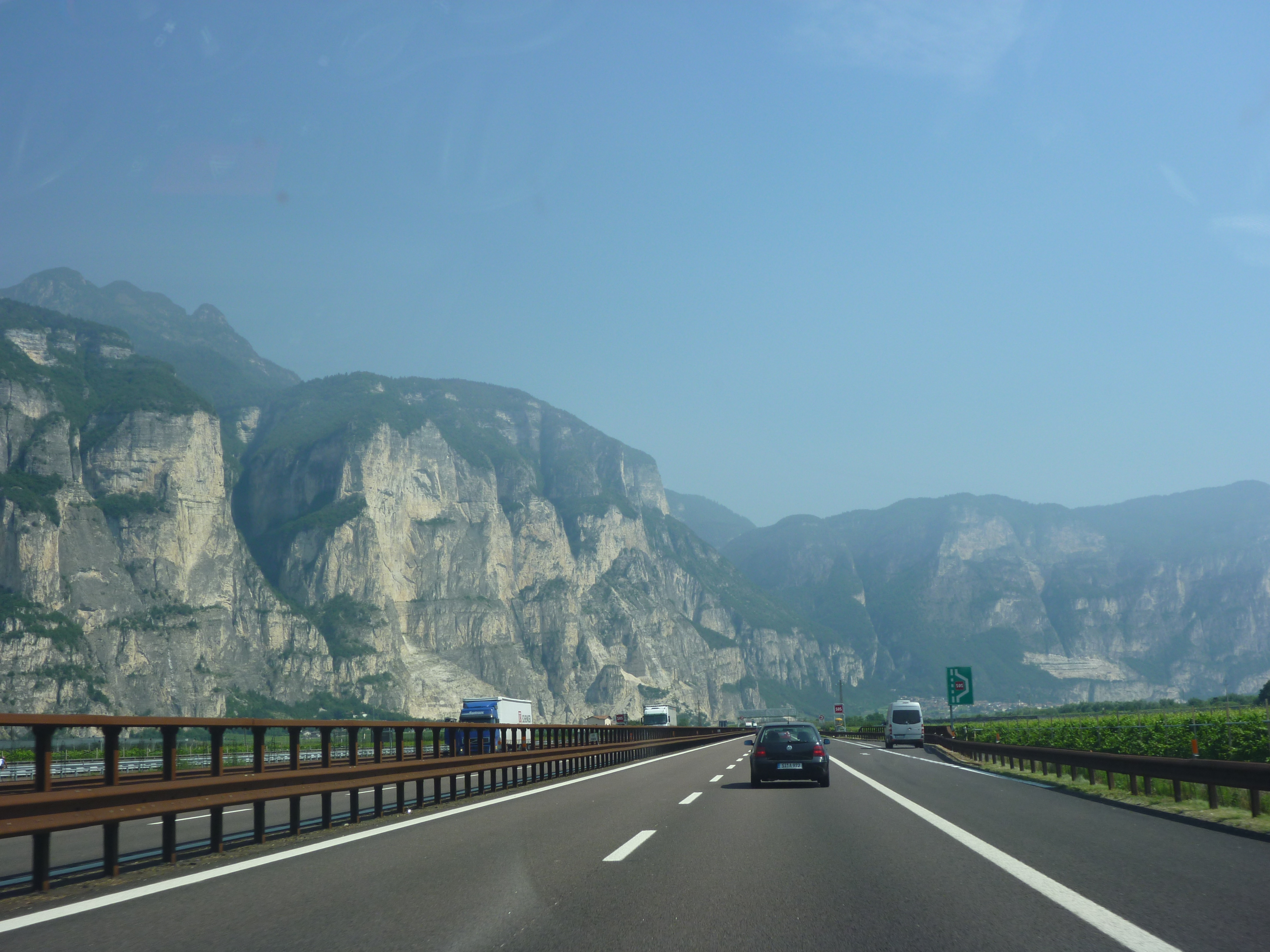
Autostrada A22 runs through Po Valley and Alps linking Modena to Brenner Pass, a mountain pass which forms the border between Italy and Austria

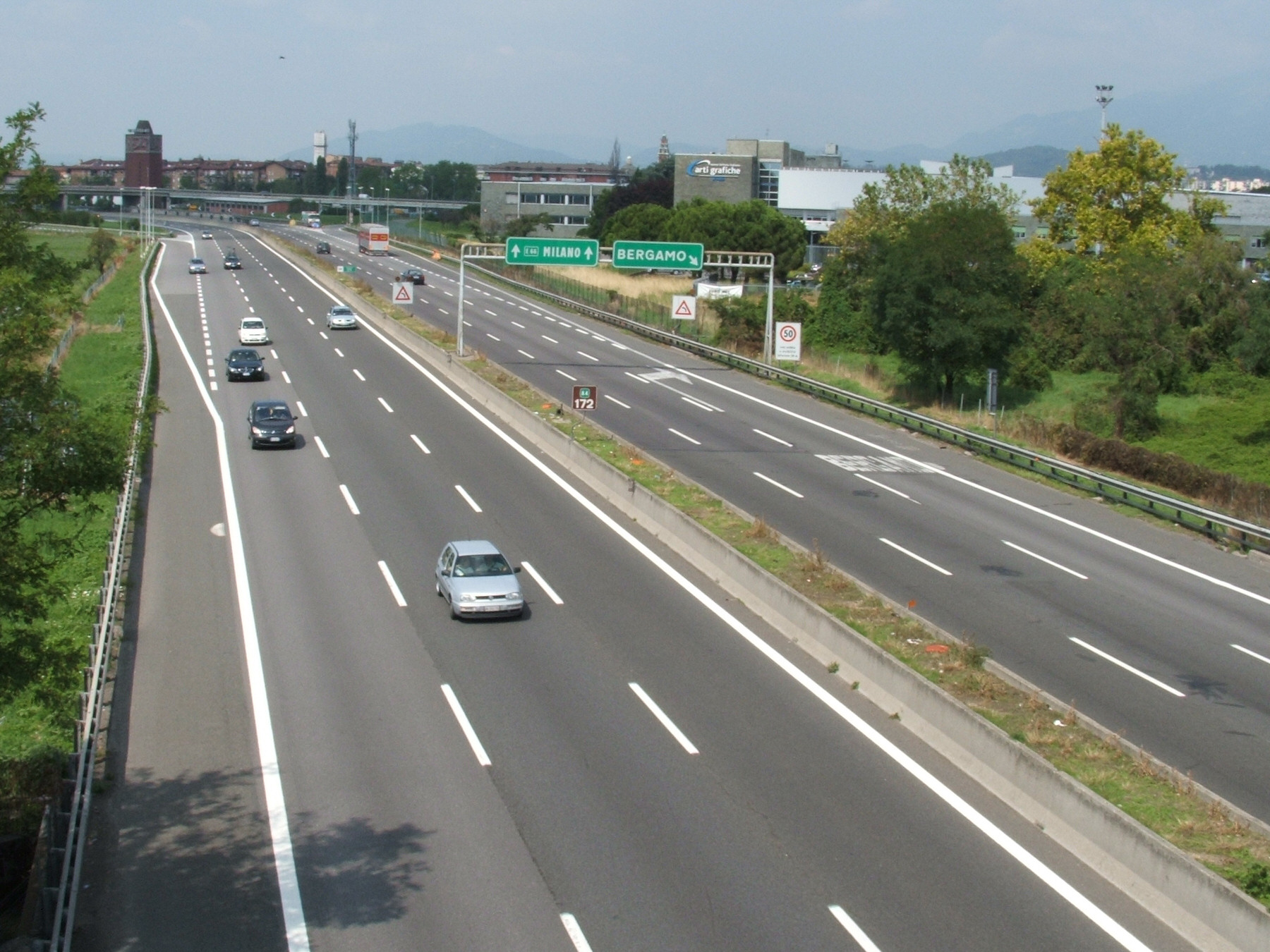
Autostrada A4 runs through Po Valley linking Turin and Trieste via Milan and Venice

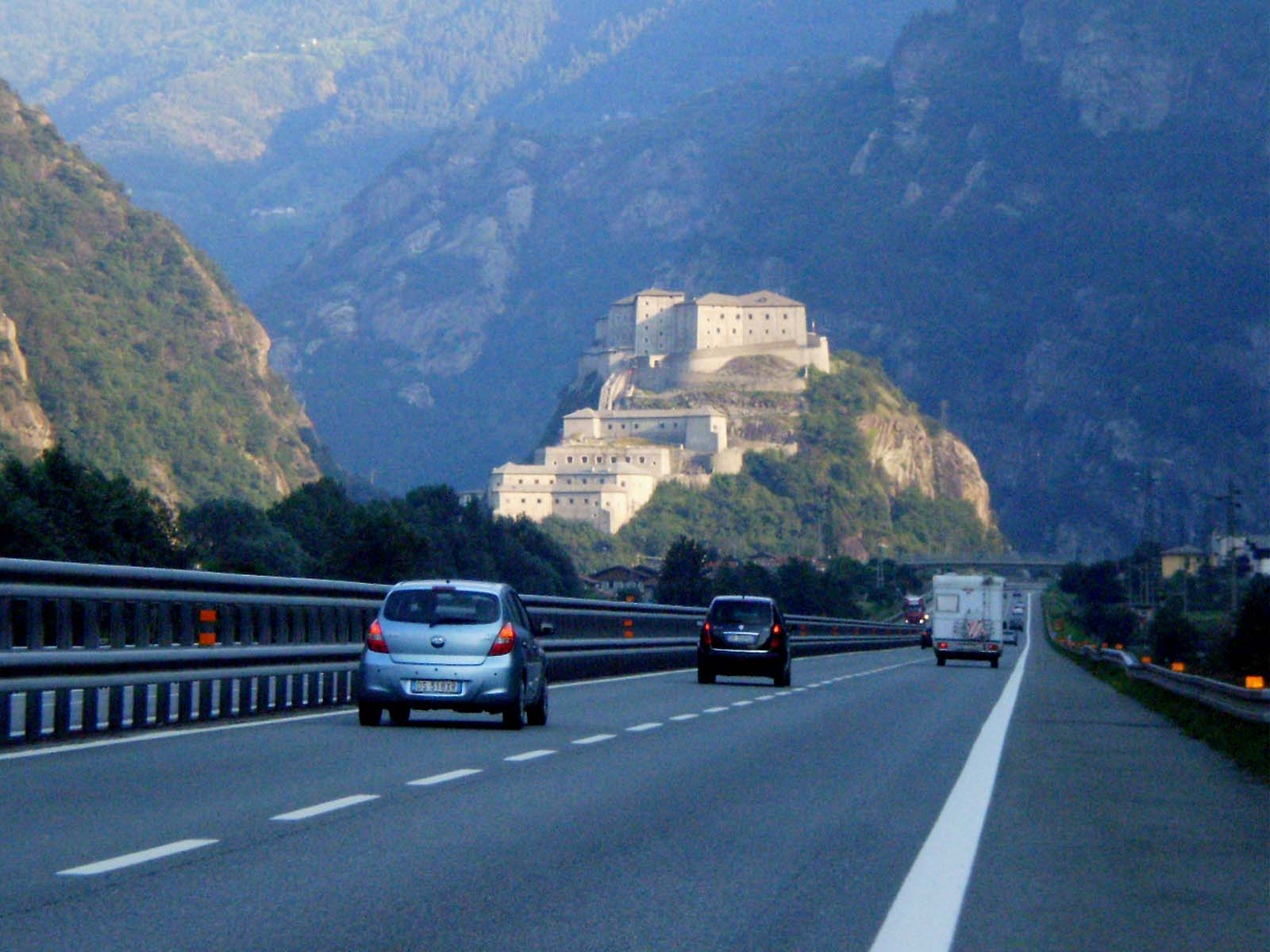
Autostrada A5 connects Turin and the Aosta Valley to France, through the Mont Blanc Tunnel

==== Kosovo ====
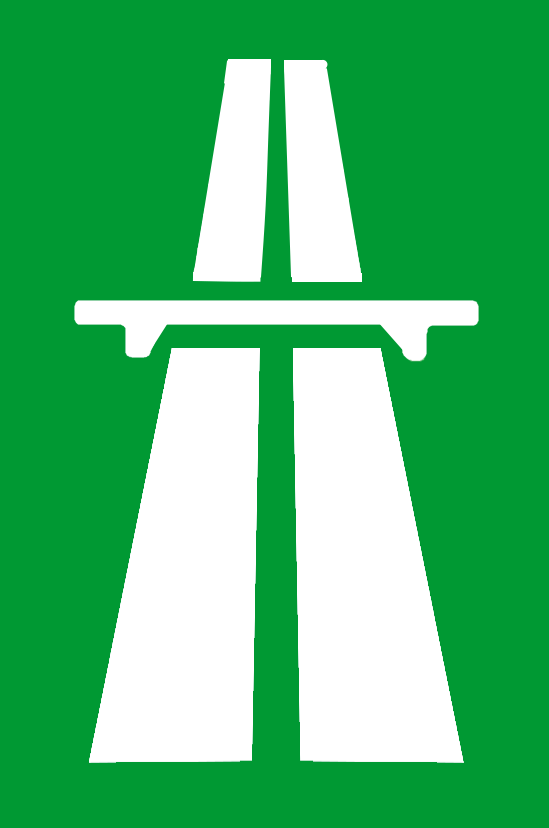

Kosovo's motorways (pronounced Austostrada/Autostradë in Albanian, and Autoput in Serbian) include for example, R7 (Ibrahim Rugova Highway) connecting to Albania's A1 (Rruga e Kombit), and it also connects to E80 in the E-Road network.

==== Latvia ====

There is currently one category of controlled-access highways in Latvia, which are expressways (Latvian: ātrgaitas ceļš) with maximum speed 120 km/h (75 mph). The first expressway in Latvia opened in October 2023, the Ķekava Bypass, which is a part of the A7. Current length of the expressway network is 11 km (6.8 mi).

==== Lithuania ====

There are two categories of controlled-access highways in Lithuania: expressways (Lithuanian: greitkeliai) with maximum speed 120 km/h (75 mph) and motorways (Lithuanian: automagistralės) with maximum speed 130 km/h (81 mph). The first section Vilnius–Kaunas of A1 highway was completed in 1970. Kaunas–Klaipėda section of A1 was completed in 1987. Vilnius-Panevėžys (A2 highway) was completed in stages during the 1980s and finished in the 1990s. Complete length of the motorway network is 310 km (190 mi). Expressway network length - 80 km (50 mi). Motorway section between Kaunas and the Polish border is planned to be completed in the 2020s.

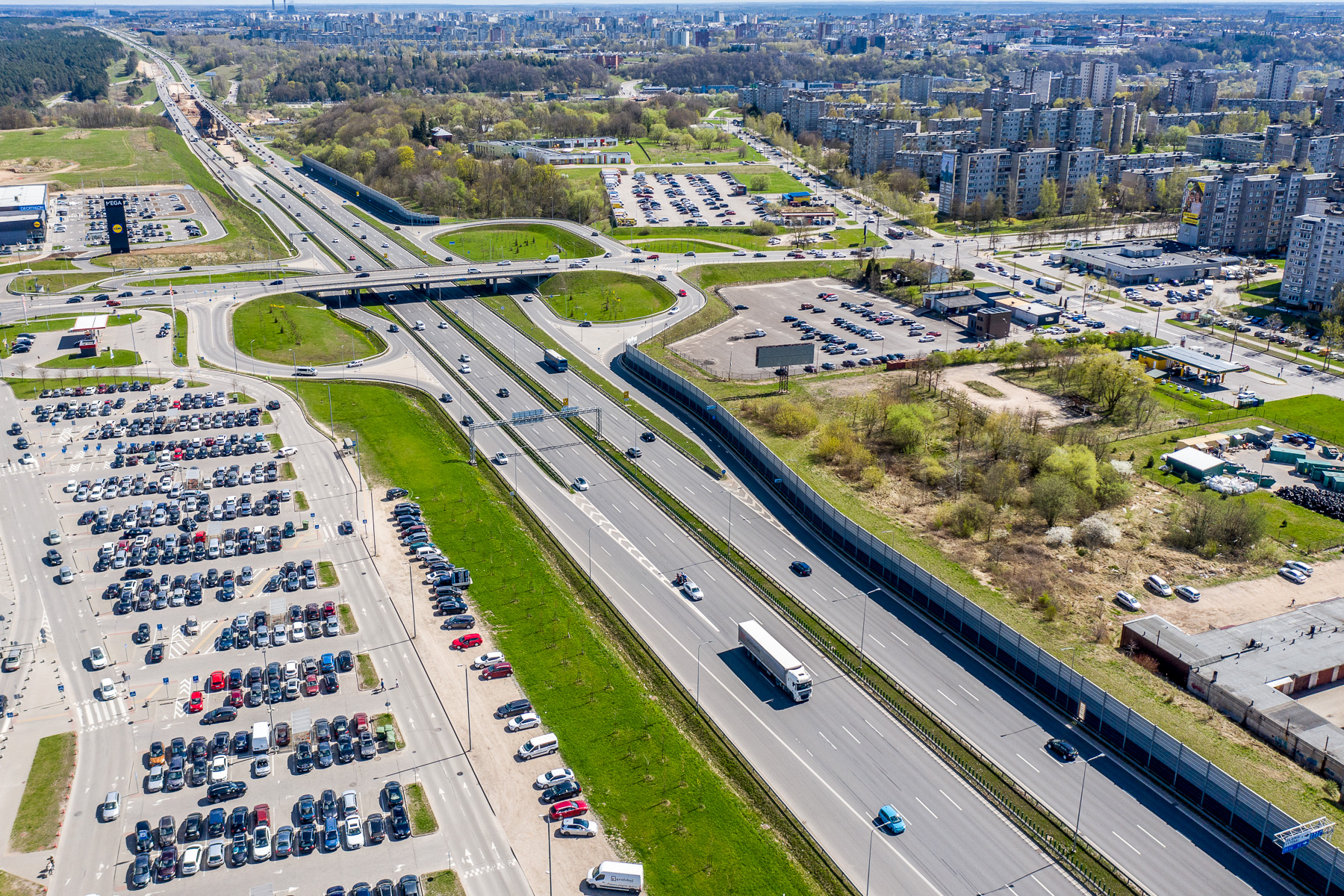
A1 motorway near Kaunas

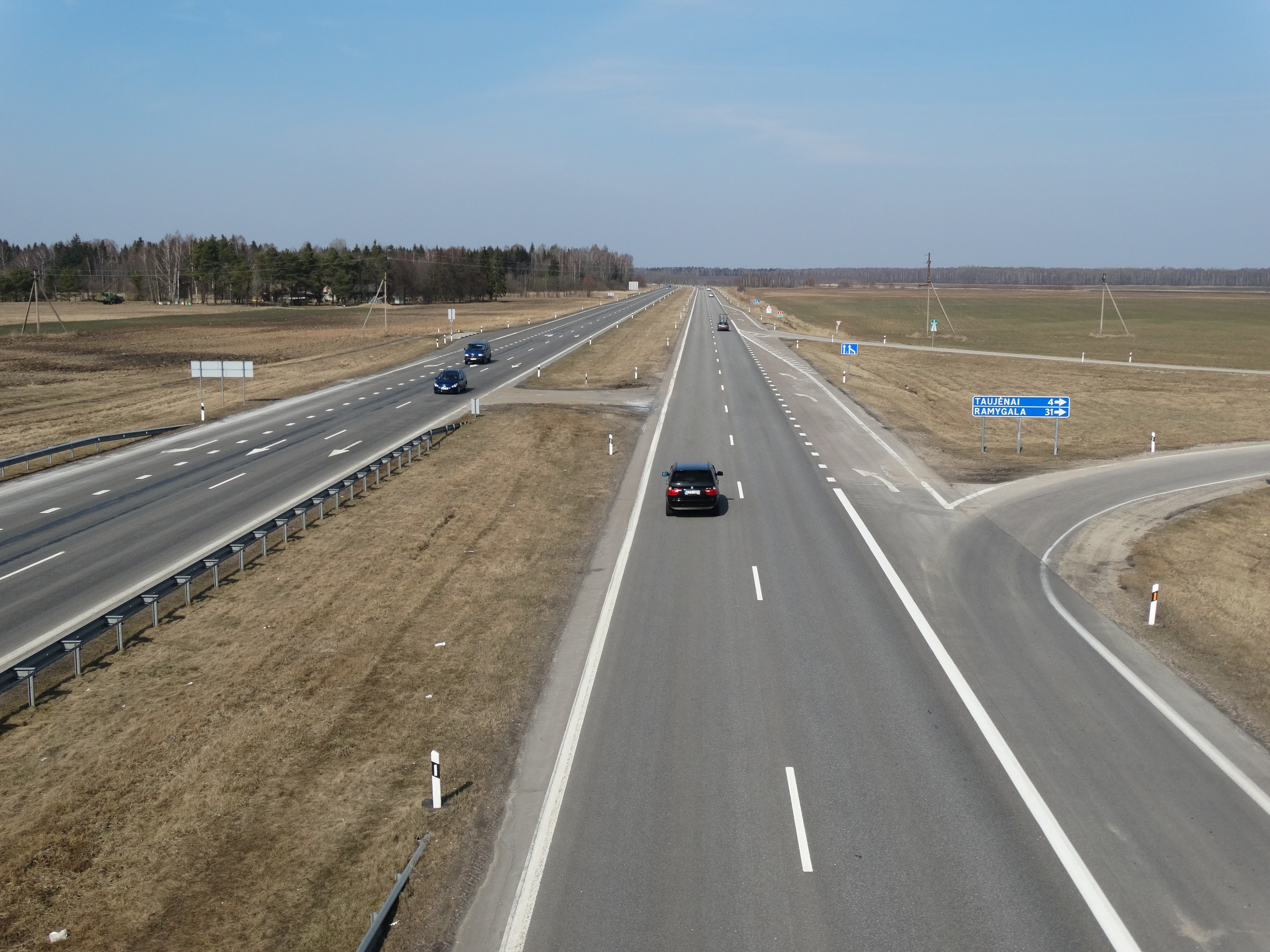
A2 motorway near Taujėnai

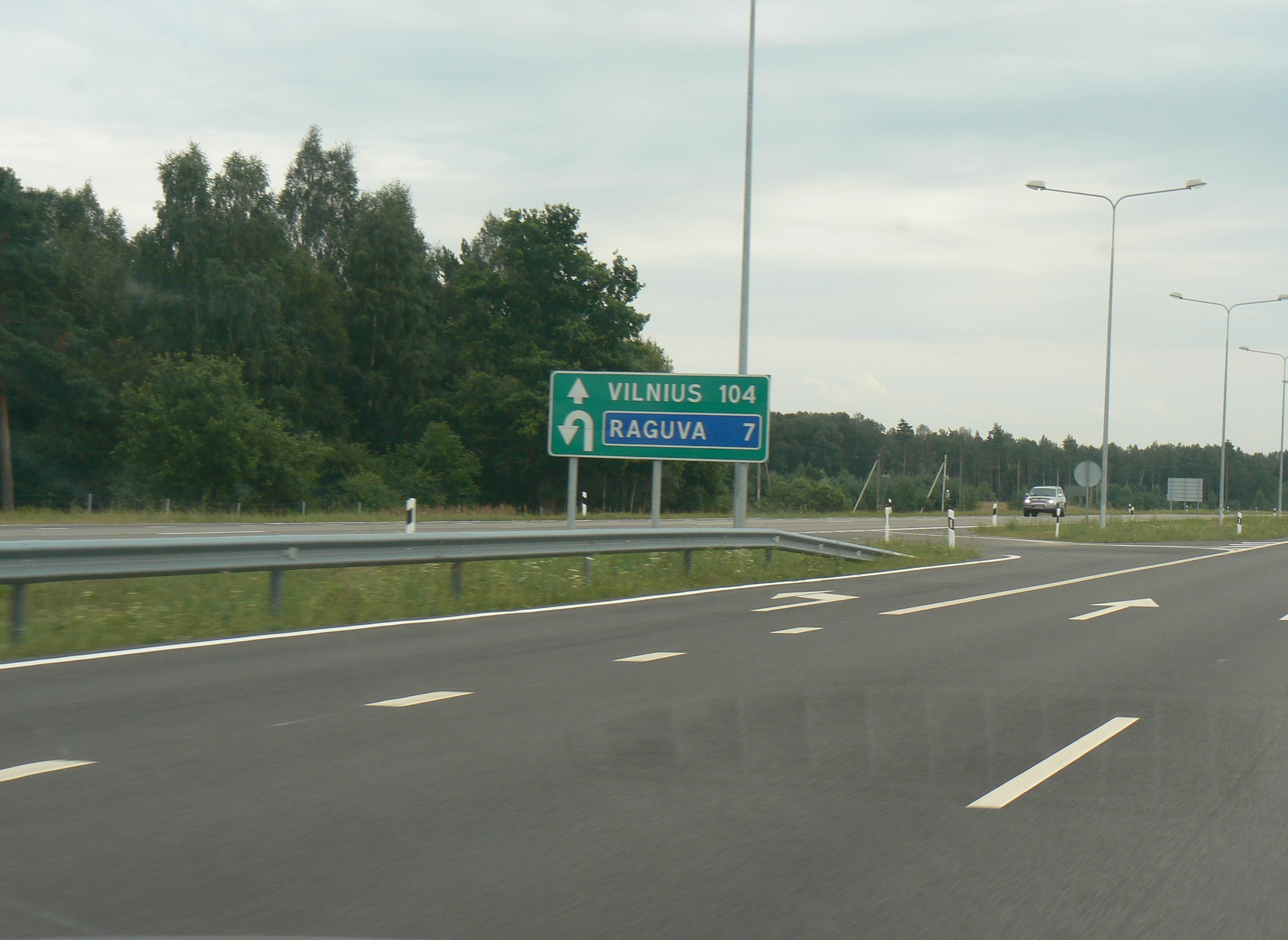
Motorway junction with U-turns. A2 motorway near Raguva.

==== Montenegro ====

Montenegro has had a motorway since 13 July 2022, when the first section of the Bar-Boljare motorway was inaugurated. On Montenegrin motorways, the speed-limit is 100 kilometres per hour (62 mph). In May 2015 work started on the first section in Montenegro, Smokovac - Uvač - Mateševo, with a length of 41 kilometres

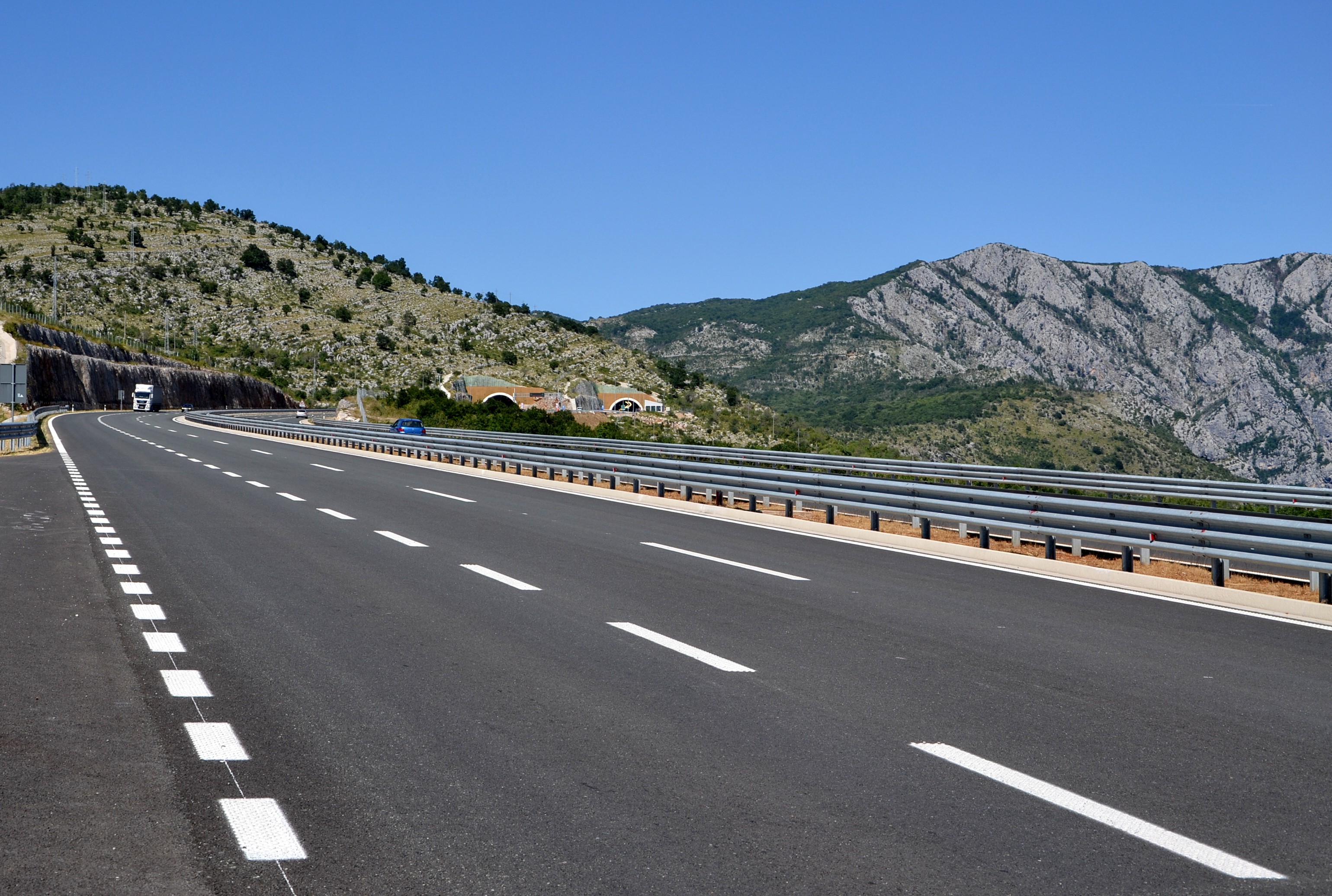
Princess Xenia motorway A-1 of July 2022

==== Netherlands ====
Autosnelweg

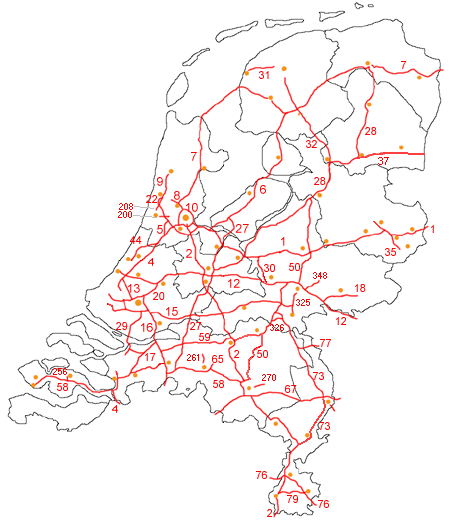
Motorways in the Netherlands

Roads in the Netherlands include at least 2,758 km (1,714 mi) of motorways and expressways, and with a motorway density of 64 kilometres per 1,000 km^{2} (103 mi/1,000 mi^{2}), the country has one of the densest motorway networks in the world. About 2,500 km (1,600 mi) are fully constructed to motorway standards, These are called Autosnelweg or simply snelweg, and numbered and signposted with an A and up to three digits, like A12.

They are consistently built with at least two carriageways, guard rails and interchanges with grade separation. Since September 2012, the nationwide maximum speed has been raised to 130 km/h (81 mph), but on many stretches speed is still limited to 120 or 100 km/h (75 or 62 mph). Dutch motorways may only be used by motor vehicles both capable and legally allowed to go at least 60 km/h (37 mph).

In March 2020, the general speed limit on Dutch motorways was lowered to 100 km/h (62 mph) during the day (6 am until 7 pm). At night, the maximum speed is different per stretch, but 130 km/h (81 mph) remained the upper limit.

Dutch roads are used with a very high intensity in relation to the network length and traffic congestion is common, due to the country's high population density. Therefore, since 1979 large portions of the motorway network have been equipped with variable message signs and dynamic electronic displays, both of which are aspects of intelligent transportation systems. These signs can show a lower speed limit, as low as 50 km/h (31 mph), to optimize the flow of heavy traffic, and a variety of other communications. Additionally there are peak, rushhour or plus lanes, which allow motorists to use the hard shoulder as an extra traffic lane in case of congestion. These extra lanes are observed by CCTV cameras from a traffic control center.

Less common, but increasingly, separate roadways are created for local/regional traffic and long-distance traffic. This way the number of weaving motions across lanes is reduced, and the traffic capacity per lane of the road is optimized. A special feature of Dutch motorways is the use of Porous Asphalt Concrete, which allows water to drain efficiently, and even in heavy rain no water will splash up, in contrast to concrete or other road surfaces. The Netherlands is the only country that uses PAC this extensively, and the goal is to cover 100% of the motorways with PAC, in spite of the high costs of construction and maintenance.

Local and express lanes connected using a basketweave

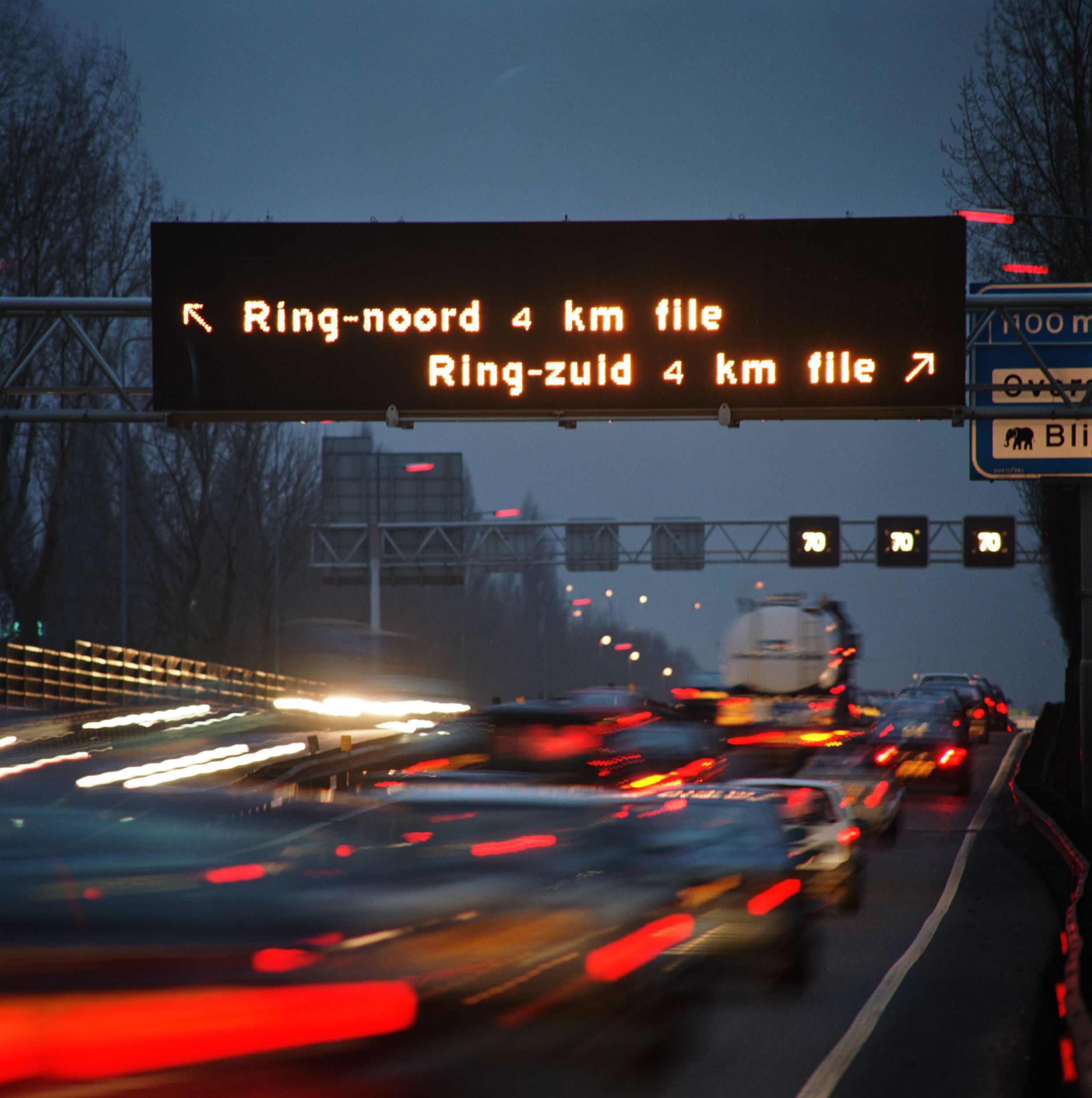
Dynamic Route Information Panel (DRIP) on Dutch A13 freeway during evening rush hour

==== North Macedonia ====

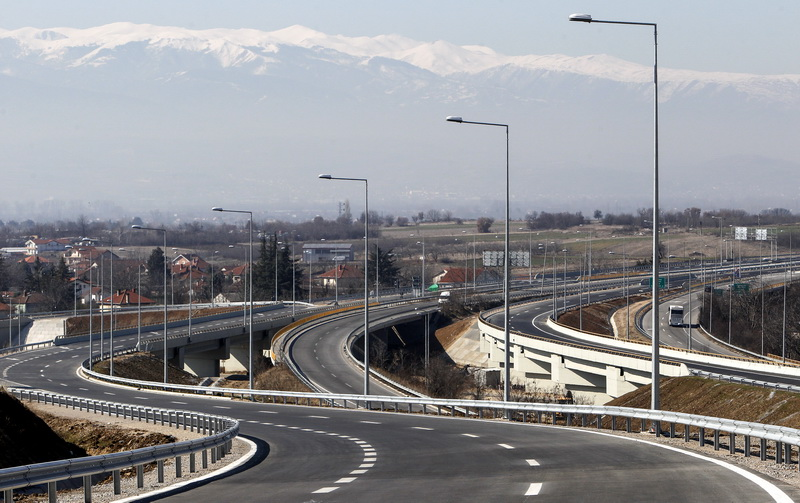
A1/A2/A4 Interchange at Miladinovci, North Macedonia

The total motorway network length in North Macedonia is 317 km (197 mi) as of Spring 2019. Another 70 km (43 mi) are under construction, 57 km (35 mi) (Ohrid to Kicevo) and 13 km (8.1 mi) (Skopje to Kosovo border). The stretch from Gostivar to Kicevo is planned to start with construction in 2021. The three motorway routes are A1, which is part of the European corridor E-75, A2 (part of E-65) and the recently built A4 corridor that connects Skopje to Stip. A1 connects the northern border (Serbia) with the southern one (Greece), while A2 traverses the country from the East (Bulgaria border) to West (Albania border), but only the stretch from Kumanovo to Gostivar is a divided motorway, while the rest of the length is either an undivided two-way road or in the process of turning into a motorway.

==== Norway ====

Norway has (2022) 770 km (480 mi) of motorways, in addition to 498 km (309 mi) of limited-access roads (in Norwegian motortrafikkvei) where pedestrians, bicycles, etc. are forbidden, though with a slightly lower standard than a true motorway. Most of the network serves the big cities, chiefly Oslo, Stavanger and Bergen. The northernmost motorway is, as of 2022, on E6 just south of Trondheim: see also the E6, E18, and the E39. Most motorways use four-ramp Dumbbell interchanges, but also Roundabout interchanges can be found. The first motorway was built in 1964, just outside Oslo. The motorways' road pattern layout is similar to those in the United States and Canada, featuring a yellow stripe toward the median, and white stripes between the lanes and on the edge. The speed limits are 90–110 km/h (56–68 mph).

==== Poland ====
Polish motorway and expressway network. Legend: Completed Under construction Design-build contract Under tender Planned

The highways in Poland are divided into motorways and expressways, both types featuring grade-separated interchanges with all other roads, emergency lanes, feeder lanes, wildlife protection measures and dedicated roadside rest areas. Motorways can be only dual carriageways, while expressways can be dual or, rarely, single carriageways. The start of an expressway in Poland is marked with a sign of white car on blue background, while number sign for an expressway is of red background and white letters, with the letter S preceding a number. Speed limits in Poland are 140 km/h (87 mph) on motorways and 120 km/h (75 mph) on dual-carriageway expressways.

The Regulation of the Council of Ministers defines the network of motorways and expressways in Poland totalling about 7,980 km (4,960 mi) (including about 2,100 km (1,300 mi) of motorways).

As of July 2022, there are 4,688 km (2,913 mi) of motorways and expressways in operation (58% of the intended network), while contracts for construction of further 1,170 km (727 mi) of motorways and expressways (15% of the intended network) are ongoing.

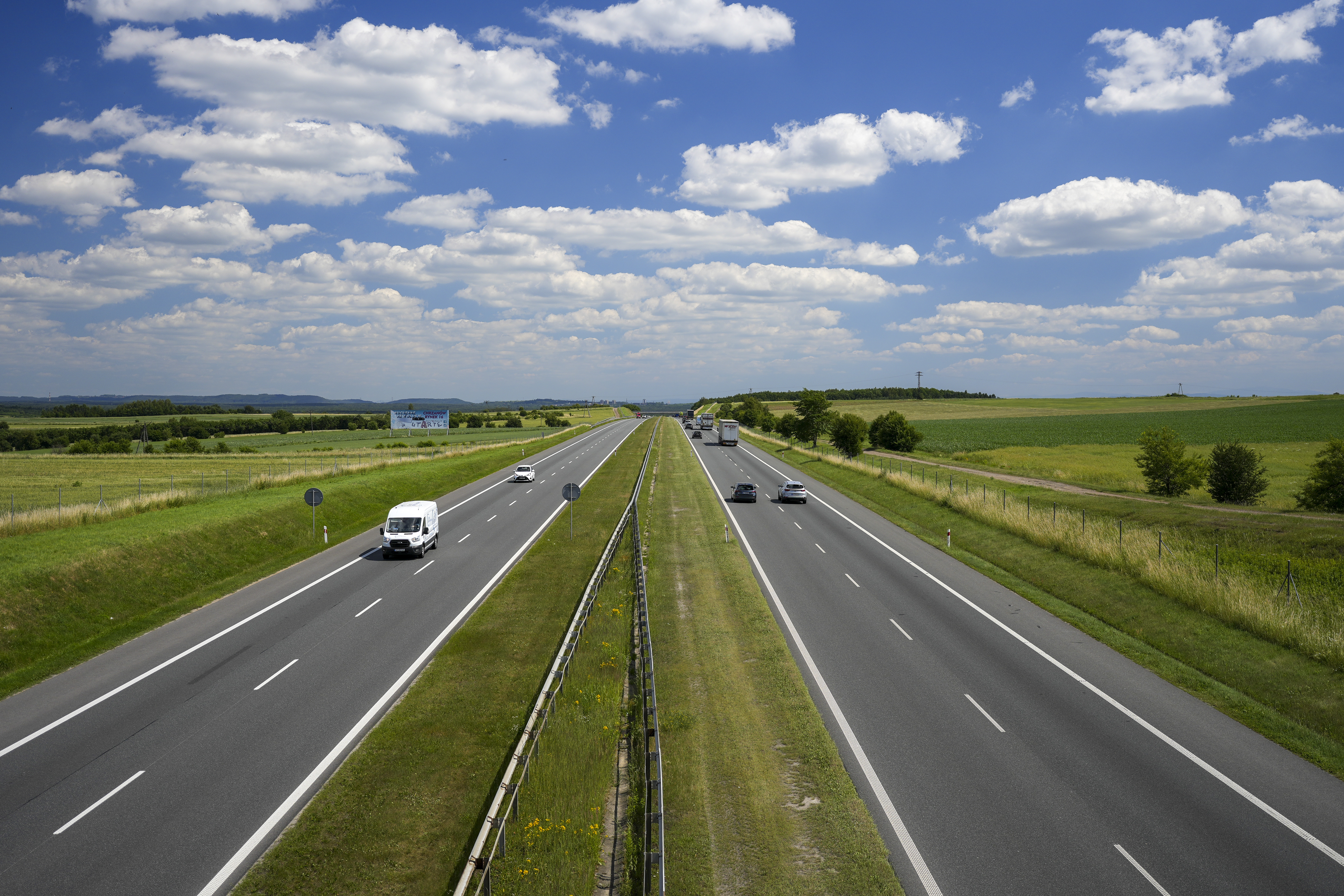
A4 near Jaworzno, opened in 1983

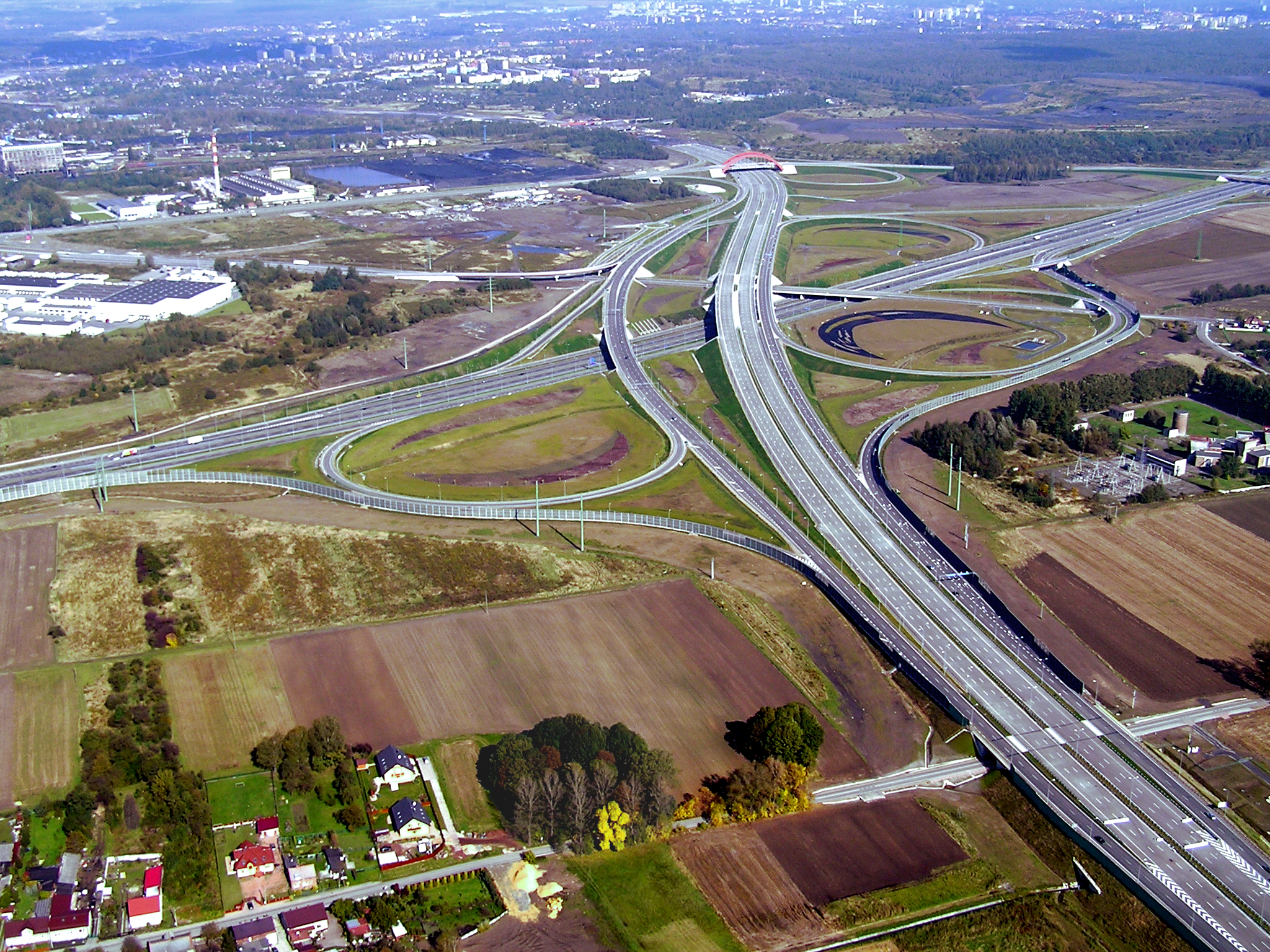
Interchange of A1 and A4 near Gliwice

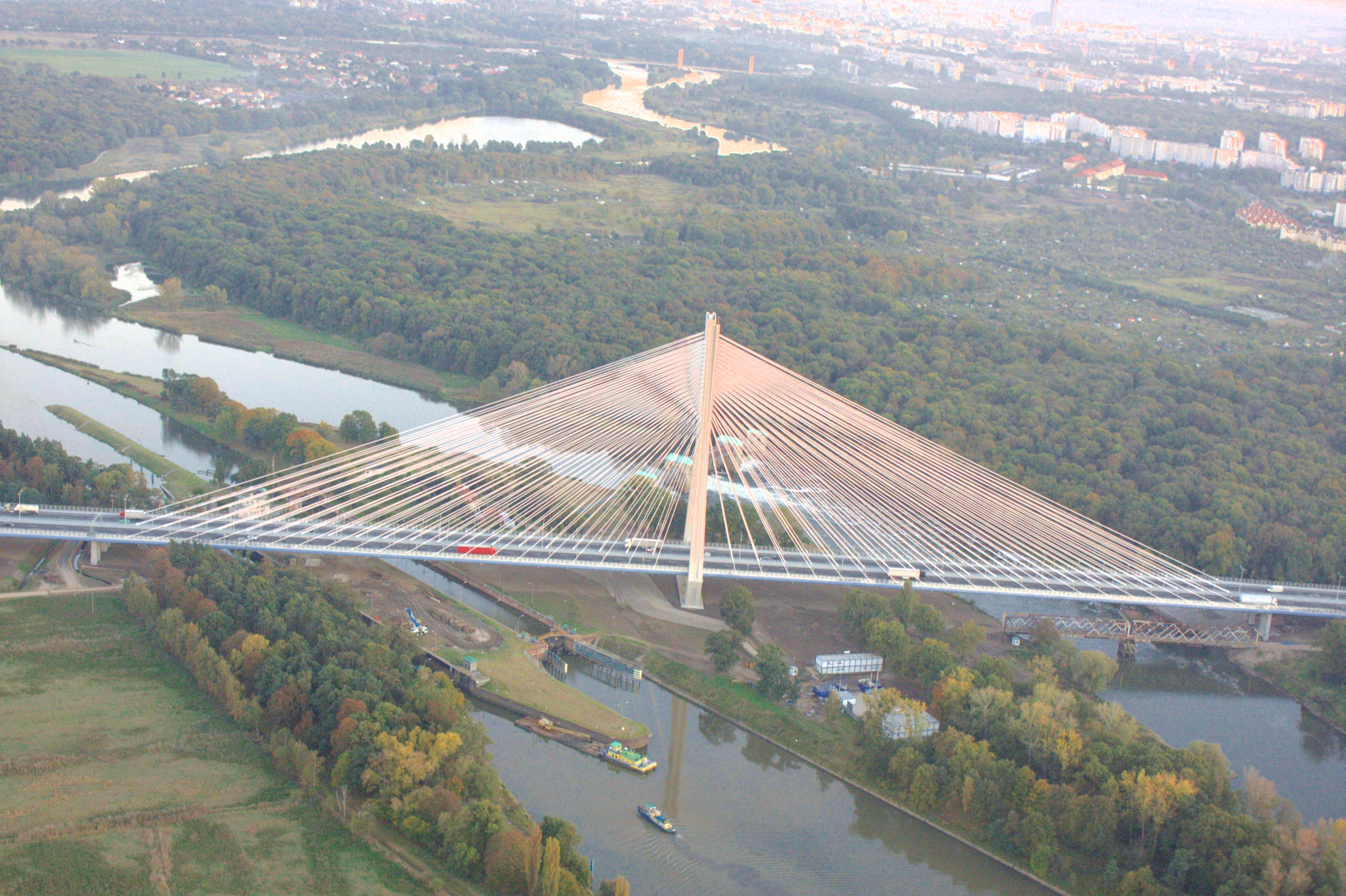
Rędziński Bridge

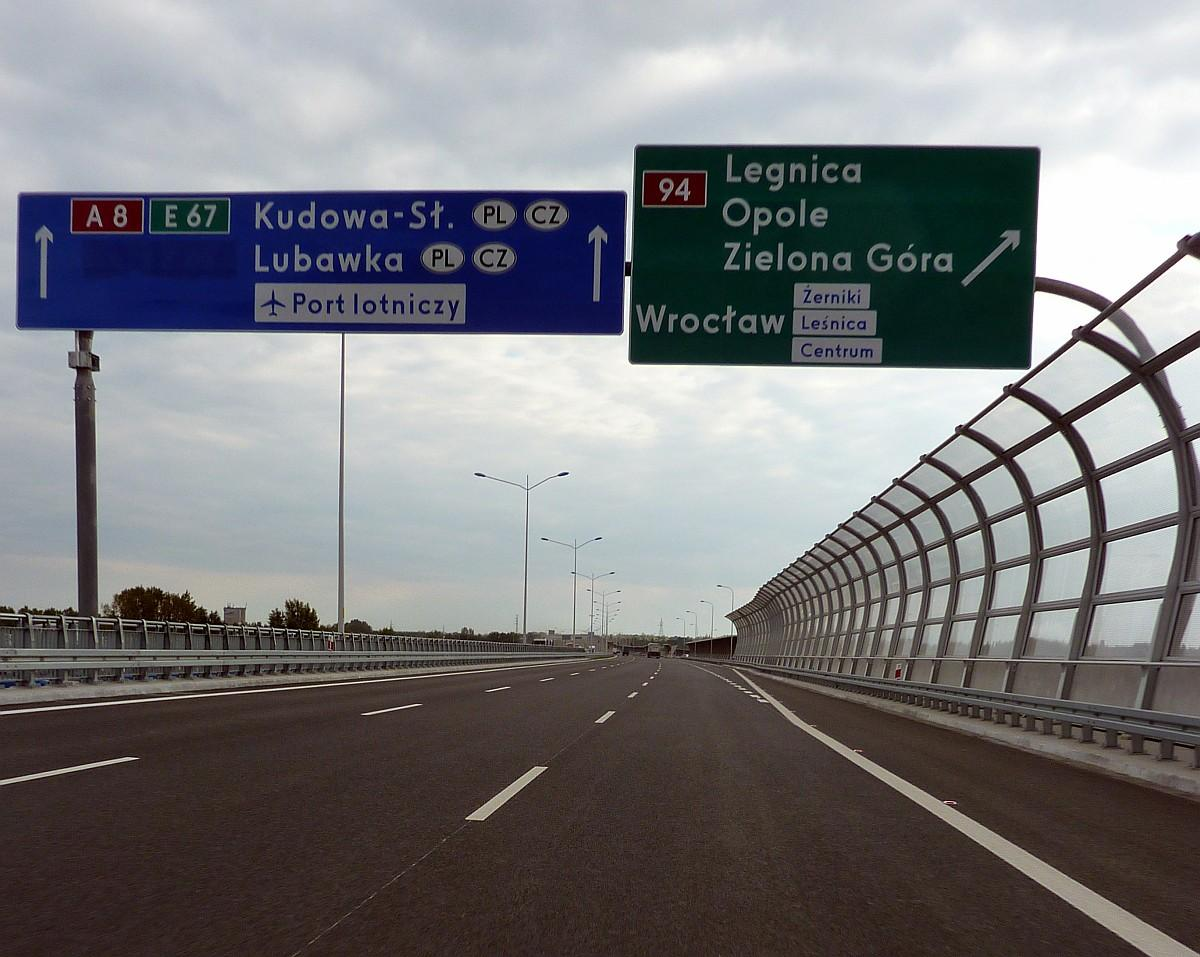
Wrocław Stadion junction

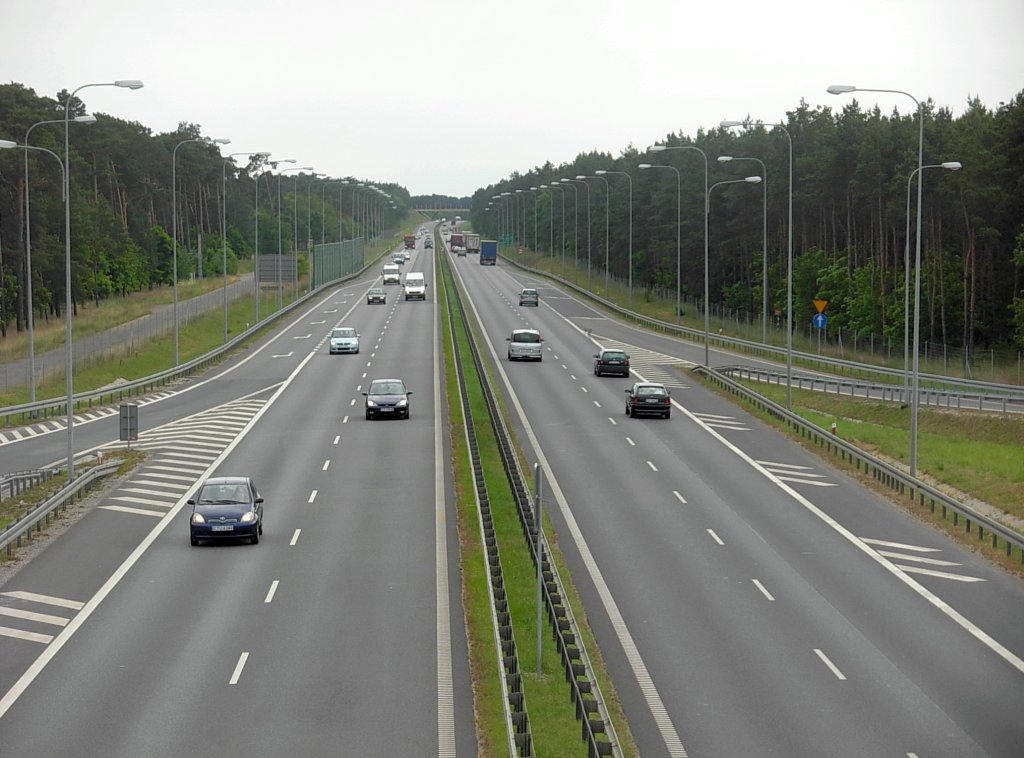
Expressway S5 near Bydgoszcz

==== Portugal ====

Portugal was the third country in Europe—after Italy and Germany—to build a motorway (Portuguese: autoestrada, plural: autoestradas), opening, in 1944, the Lisbon-Estádio Nacional section of the present A5 (Autoestrada da Costa do Estoril).

Additional motorway sections were built in the 1960s, 1970s and early 1980s. However, the large-scale building of motorways started only in the late 1980s. Currently, Portugal has a very well-developed network of motorways, with about a 3,000-kilometre (1,900 mi) extension, that connects all the highly populated coastal regions of the country and the main cities of the less populous interior. This means that 87% of the Portuguese population lives at less than 15 minutes' driving time from a motorway access.

Unlike the neighbouring Spanish network, most of Portuguese motorways are tolled, although there are also some non-tolled highways, mostly in urban areas, like those of Greater Lisbon and Greater Porto. In the late 1990s and early 2000s, the Government of Portugal created seven shadow toll concessions, the SCUT toll (Sem custos para o utilizador, no costs for the user). In those concessions it were included more than 900 km (560 mi) of motorways and highways, some of them already built, others which were built in the following years. However, due to economical and political reasons, the shadow toll concept was abolished between 2010 and 2011, with electronic toll equipment being installed in these motorways, to charge their users. Having only electronic tolls, former SCUT motorways can now only be used by vehicles equipped with electronic payment devices or vehicles registered in the system.

Portuguese motorways form an independent network (Rede Nacional de Autoestradas, National Motorway Network), that overlaps with the Fundamental and Complementary subnetworks of the National Highway Network (Rede Rodoviária Nacional). Each motorway section overlapping with the Fundamental subnetwork is part of an IP (Itinerário principal, Principal route) and each motorway section overlapping with the Complementary subnetwork is part of an IC (Itinerário complementar, Complementary route). Thus, a motorway can overlap with sections of different IP or IC routes and - on the other hand - an IP or IC route can overlap with sections of different motorways. An example is A22 motorway, which overlaps with sections of IP1 and of IC4 routes; another example is IP1 route, which overlaps with sections of the A22, A2, A12, A1 and A3 motorways.

The National Motorway Network has a proper numbering system in which each motorway has a number prefixed by the letter "A". In most cases, a motorway signage indicates only its A number. The number of the IP or IC of which a motorway section is a part is not signed except in some short motorways which lack a proper A number.

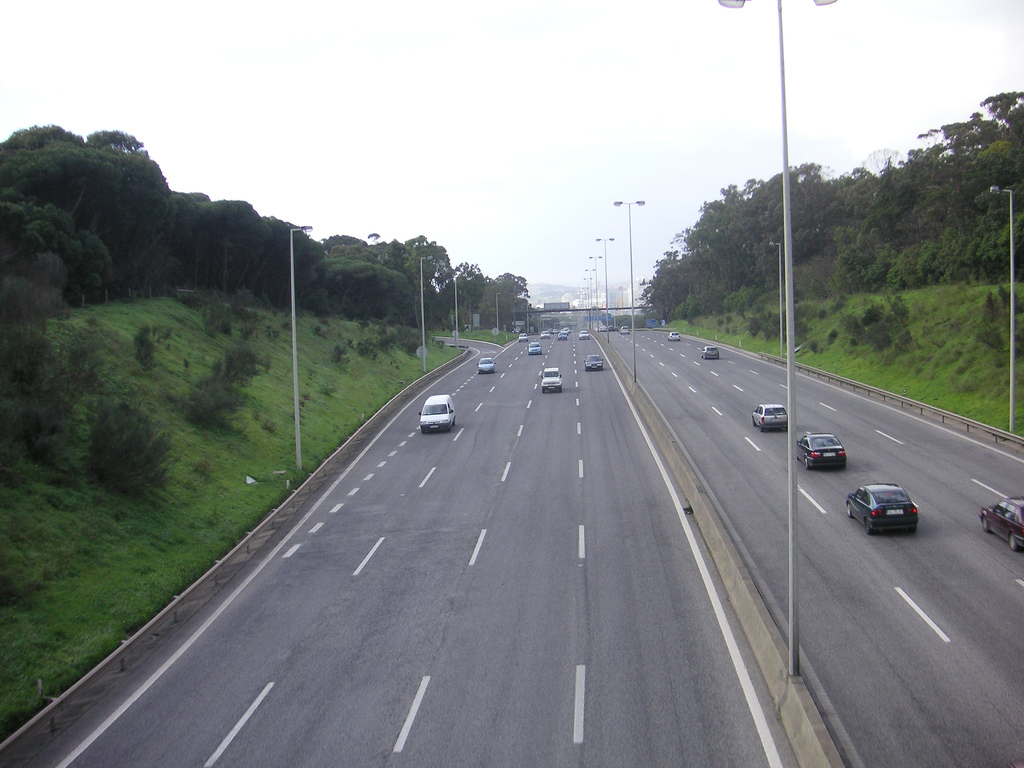
A5 (Lisbon-Cascais) motorway, inaugurated in 1944 as the first motorway in Portugal

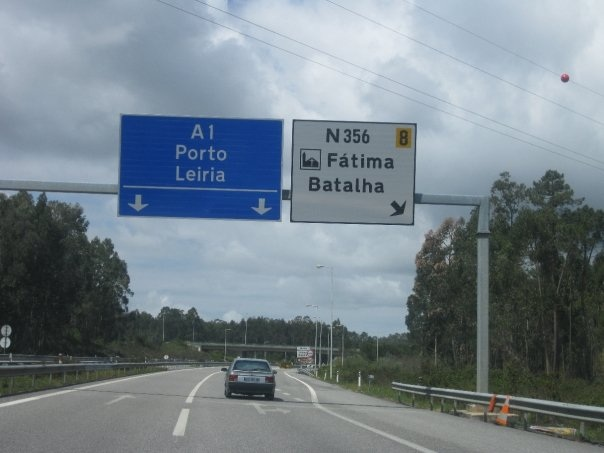
A1 (Lisbon-Porto) motorway, the main road link between the two largest cities of the country

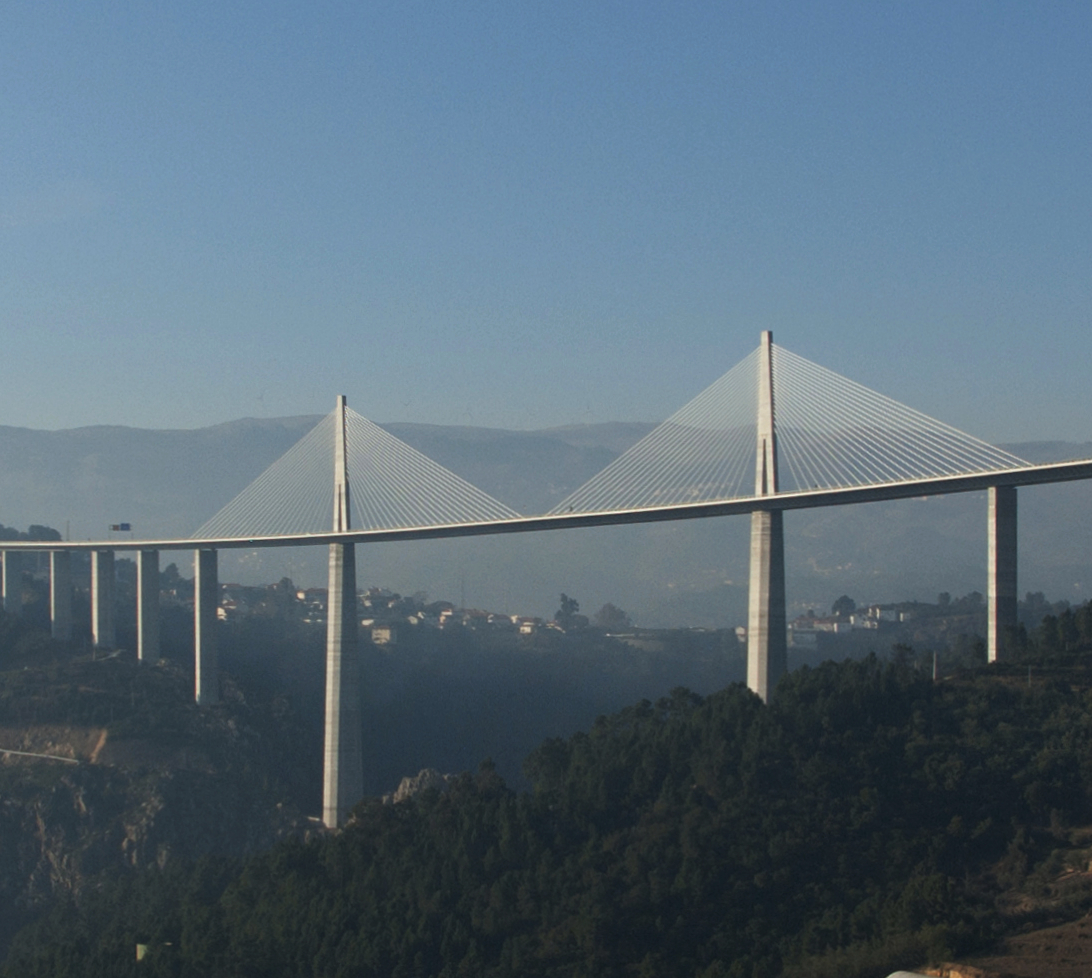
Corgo viaduct, part of the A4 (Porto-Bragança) motorway

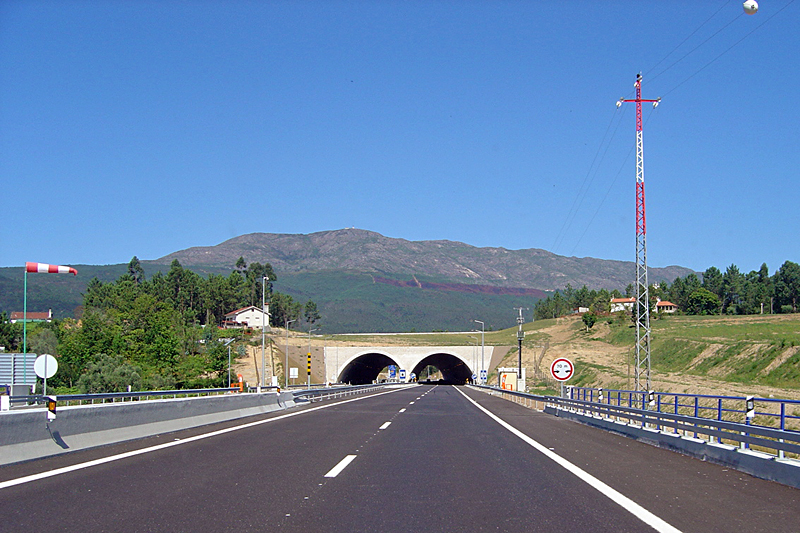
Tunnel at the A27 (Ponte de Lima-Viana do Castelo) motorway

==== Romania ====

Planned motorways in Romania

As of 31 August 2026, Romania has 1,475.775 km (917.004 mi) of highways in use, with more under construction.

The first motorway in Romania was completed in 1972, linking Bucharest and Pitești. The Romanian Government has adopted a General Master Plan for Transport that was approved by the European Union in July 2015, containing the strategy for expanding the road (including motorway) network until 2040, using EU co-financing.

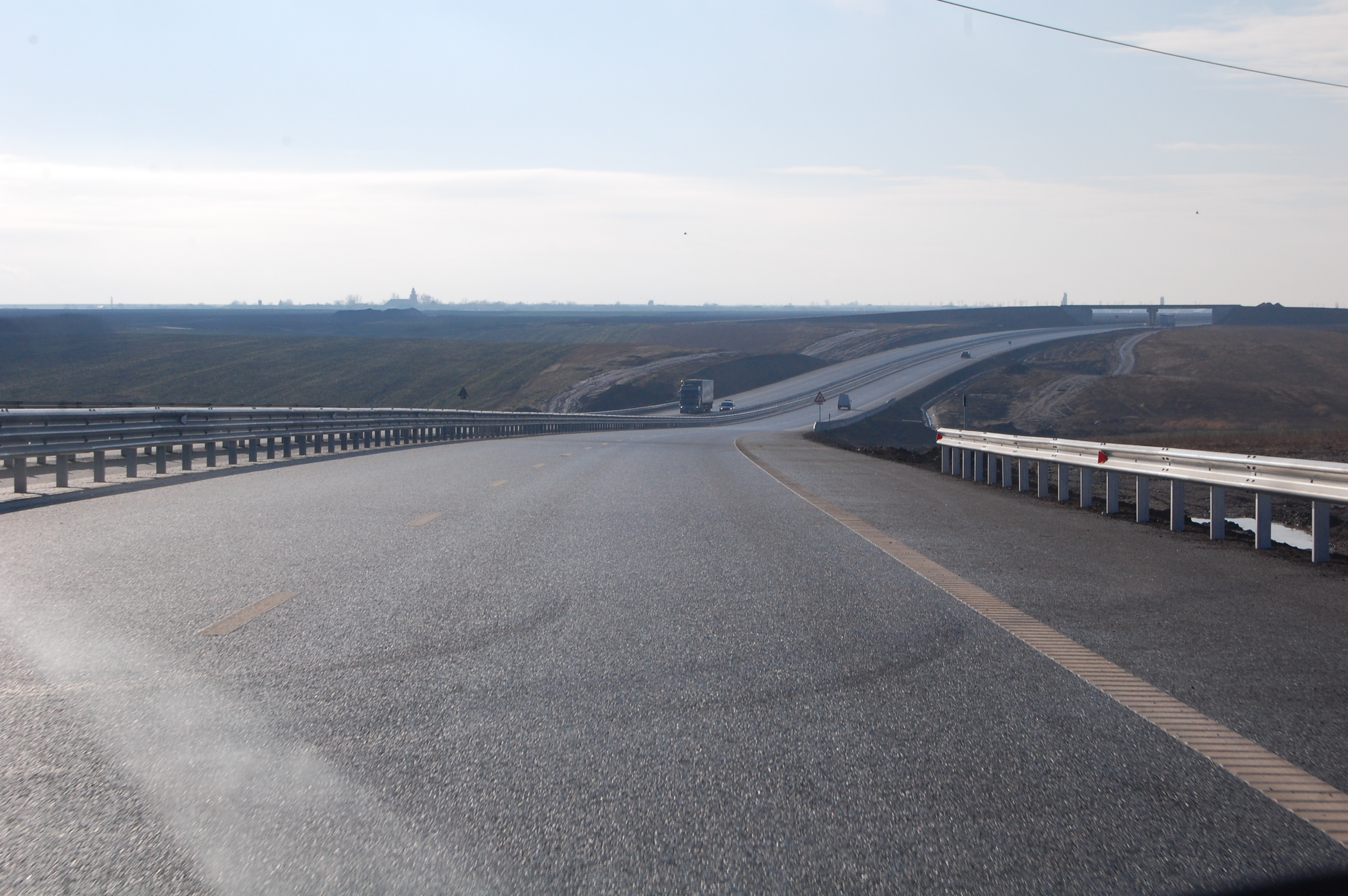
A1 motorway between Arad and Timișoara

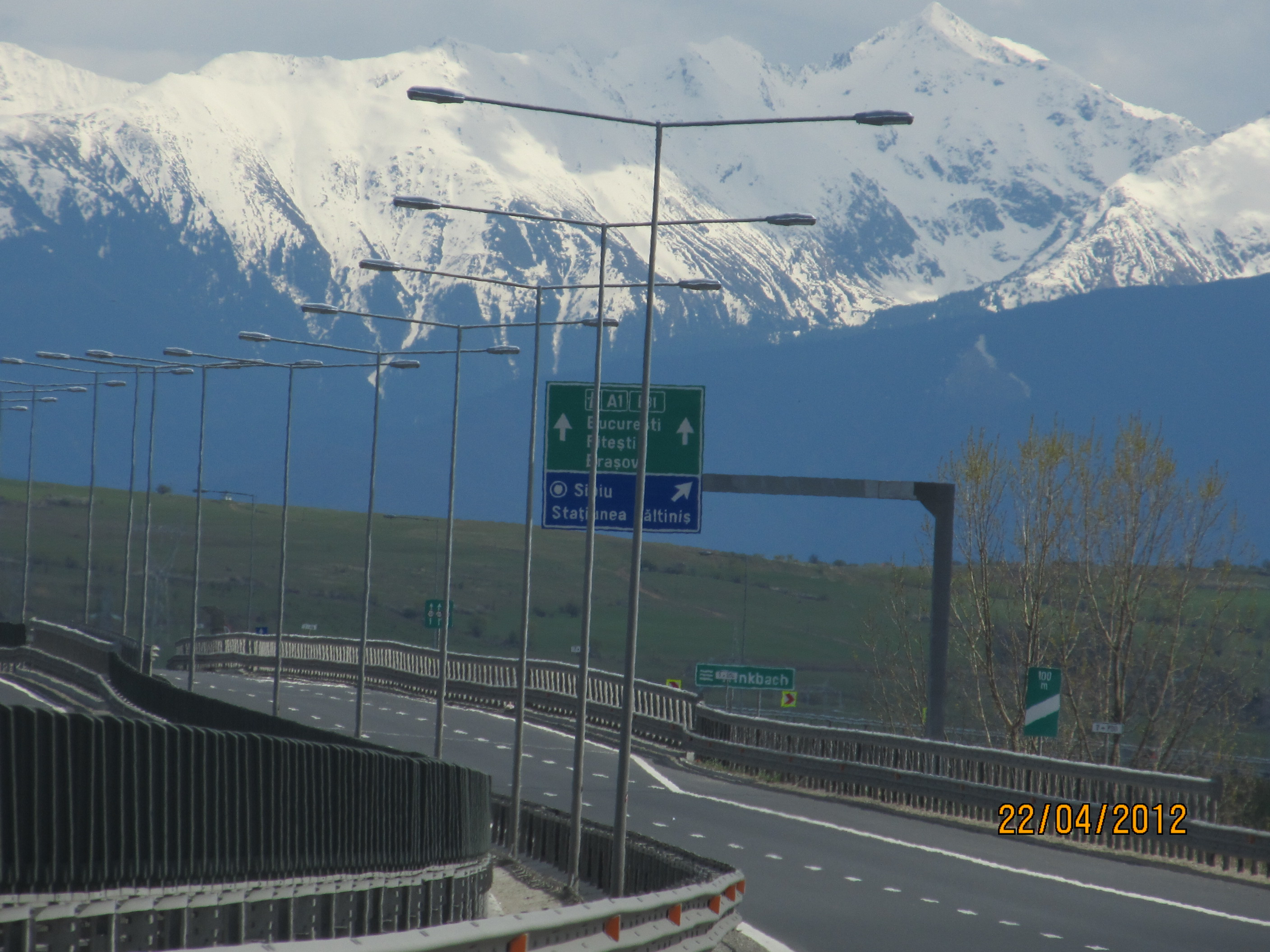
A1 motorway near Sibiu

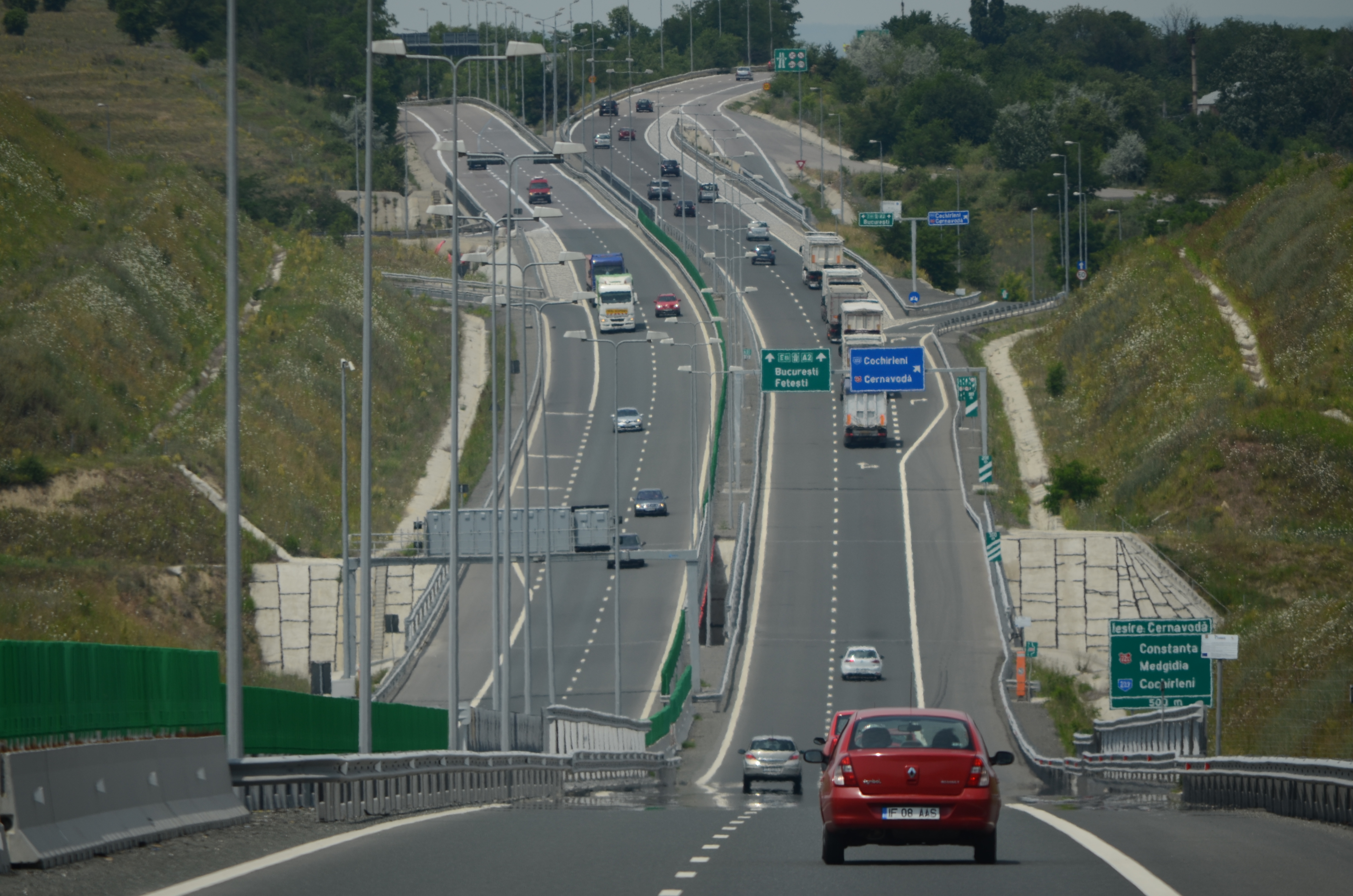
A2 motorway near Cernavodă interchange

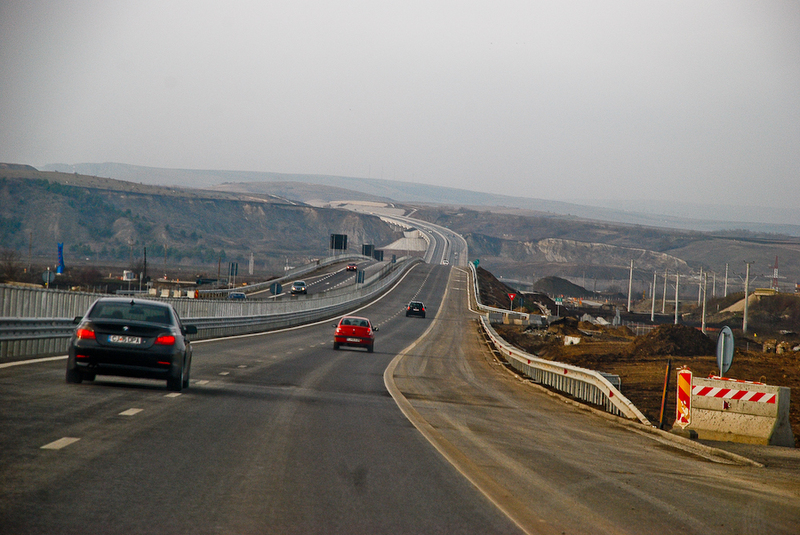
A3 motorway between Gilău and Turda

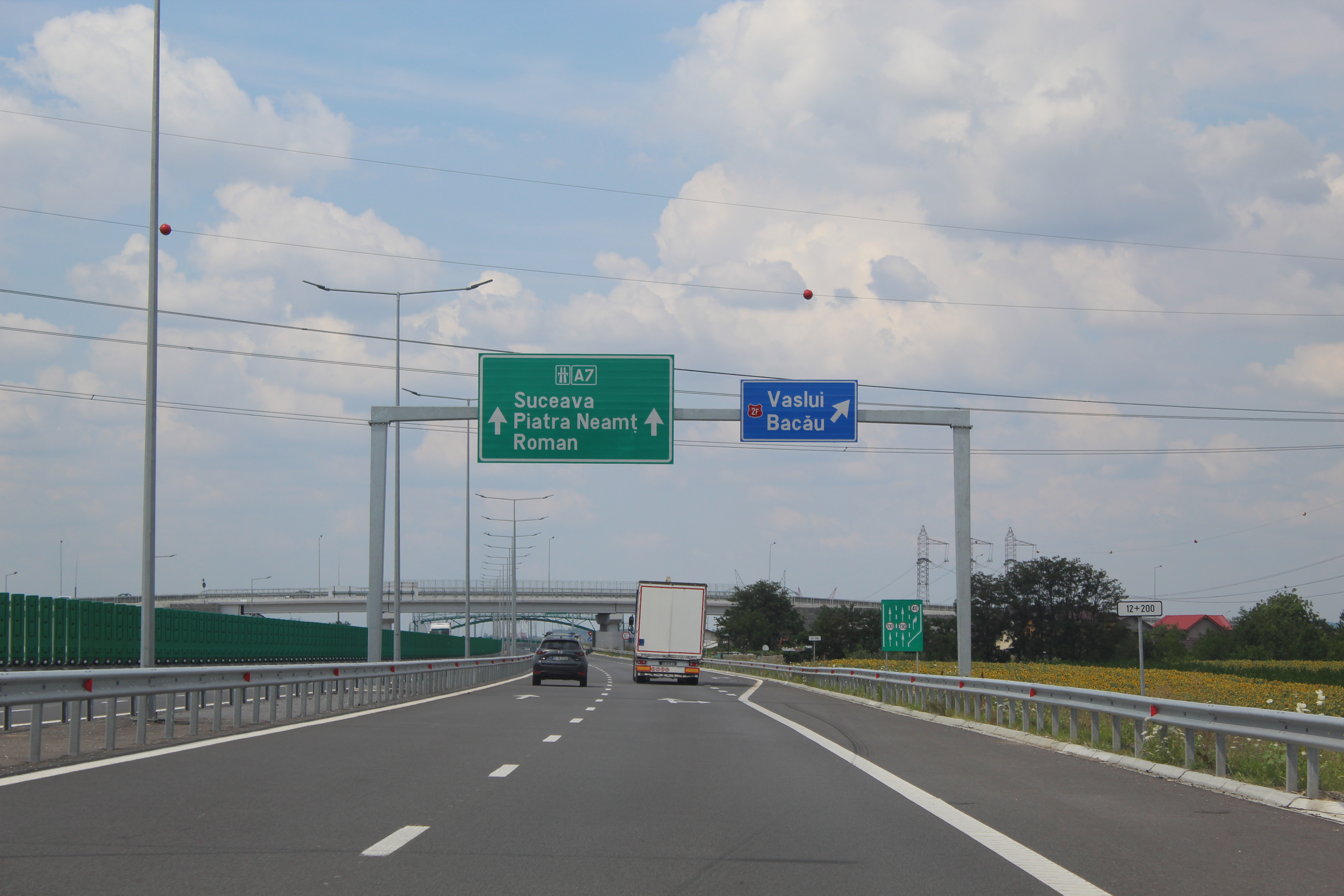
A7 motorway near Bacău Bypass

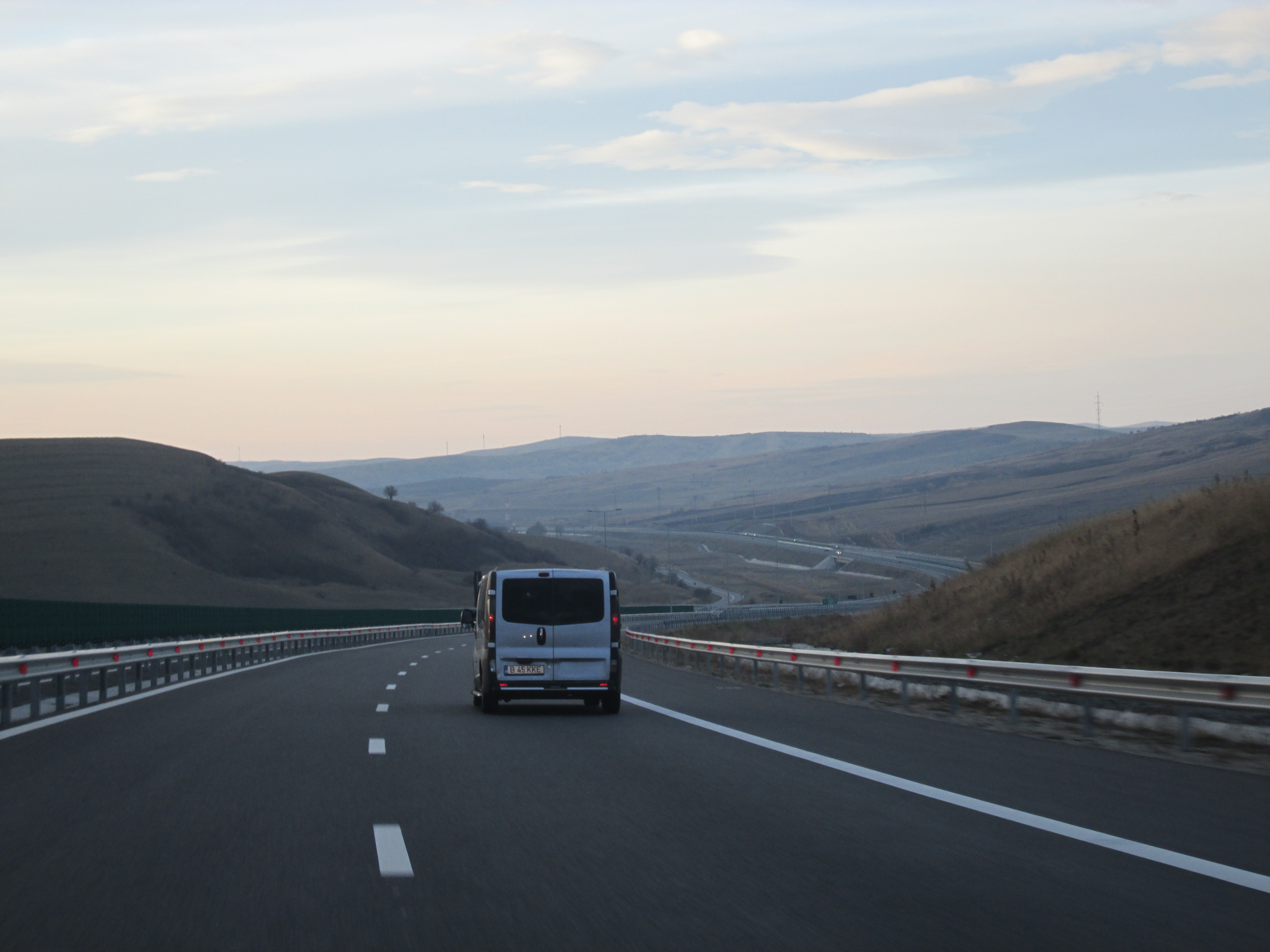
A10 motorway and the hills of Transilvania

==== Russia ====

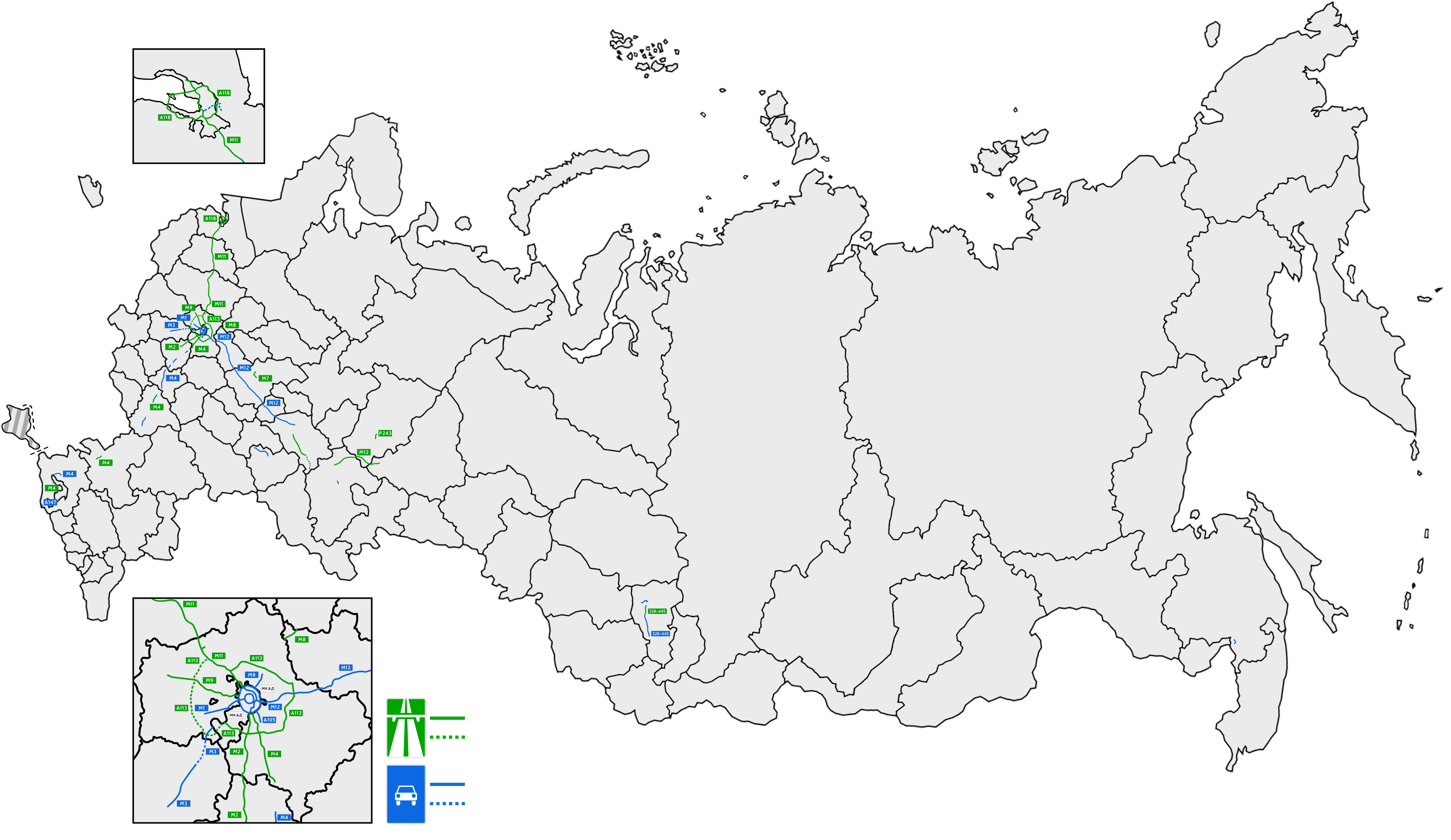
Motorways and expressways in Russia. Legend: Motorway Motorway planned or under construction Expressway Expressway planned or under construction

In 2025, Russia had a nationwide motorway network with a length of 2,140.9 km (1,330.3 mi) and expressway network of 2,752 km (1,710 mi).

The motorways and expressways have the numbering of the Russian federal highway network or their own name, as there is no separate numbering system for motorways and expressways and their sections are mostly part of the Russian federal highway network. The legal speed limit on motorways and expressways is 110 km/h, and 130 km/h on some newly upgraded sections of motorway. Sections of Russian federal highway that have been upgraded to motorway status are marked with green signs. Federal highway roads that have been upgraded to expressways or dual and single carriageway with road junction are marked with blue signs.

In the classification of Russian federal highway roads, motorways are assigned to technical category IA and expressways to technical category IB.

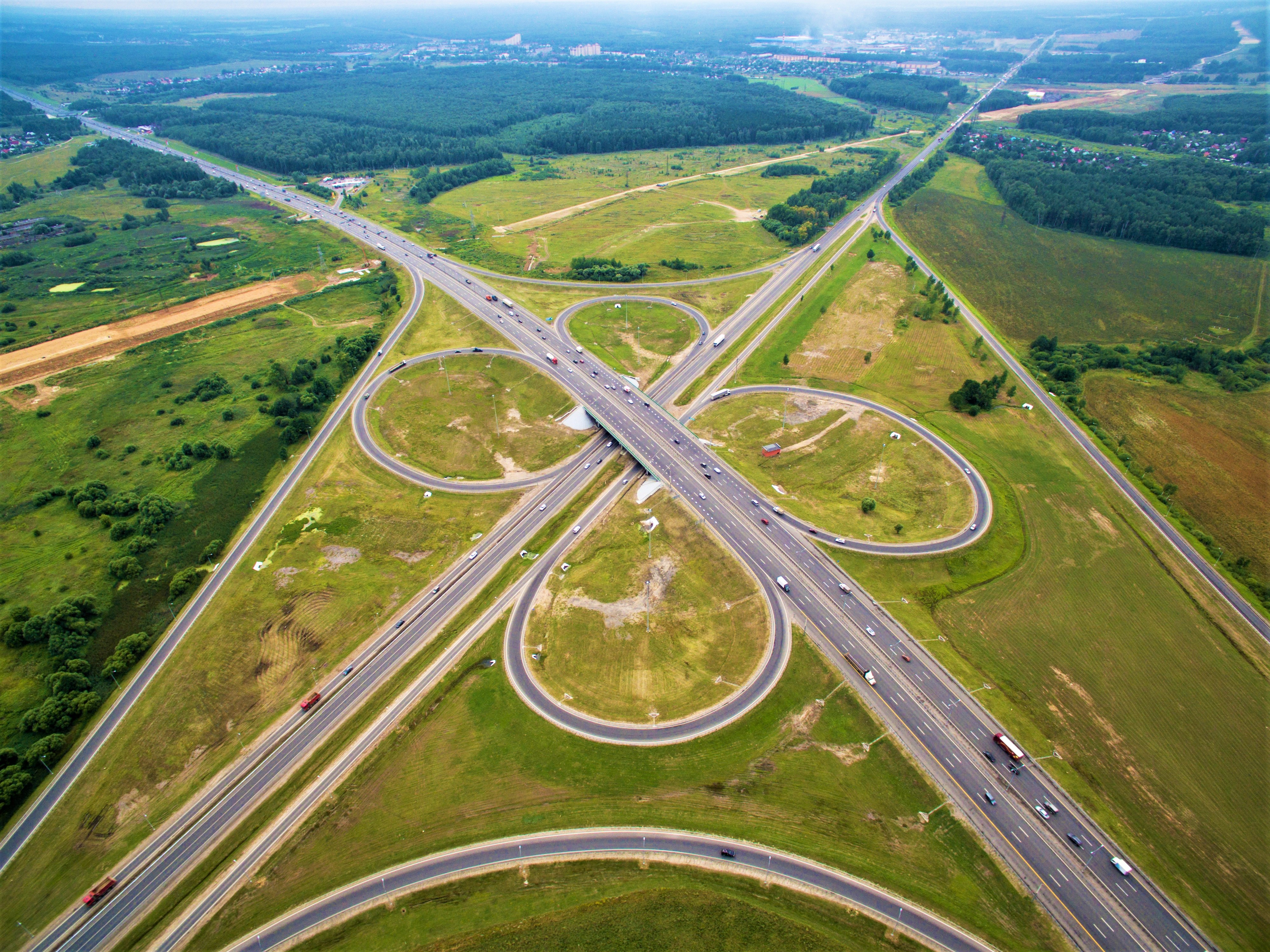
Transportation interchange at the intersection of M2 and A107

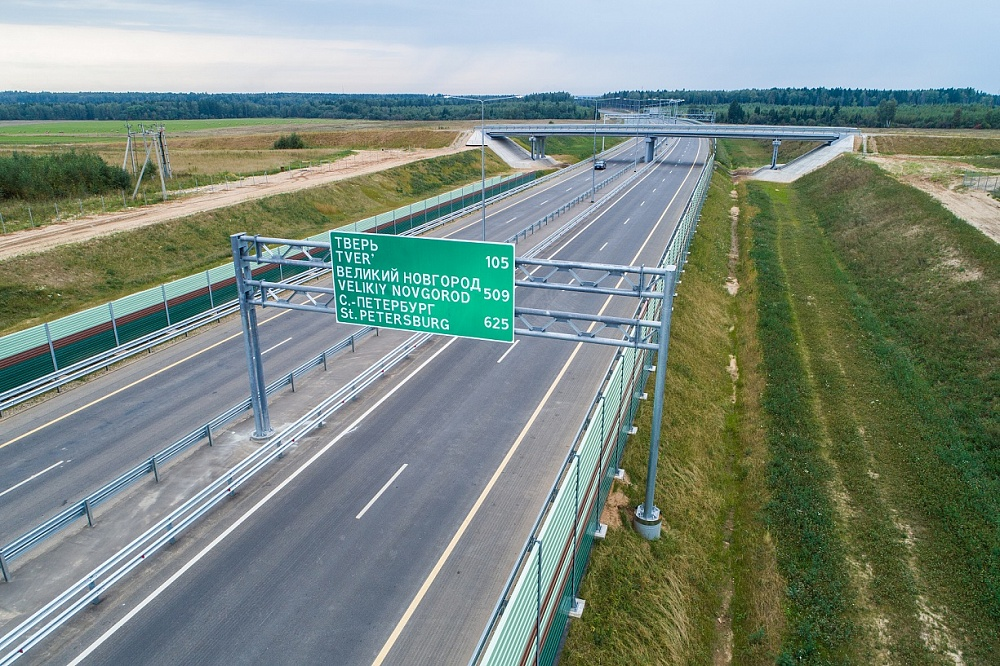
Motorway M11 between Moscow and Klin

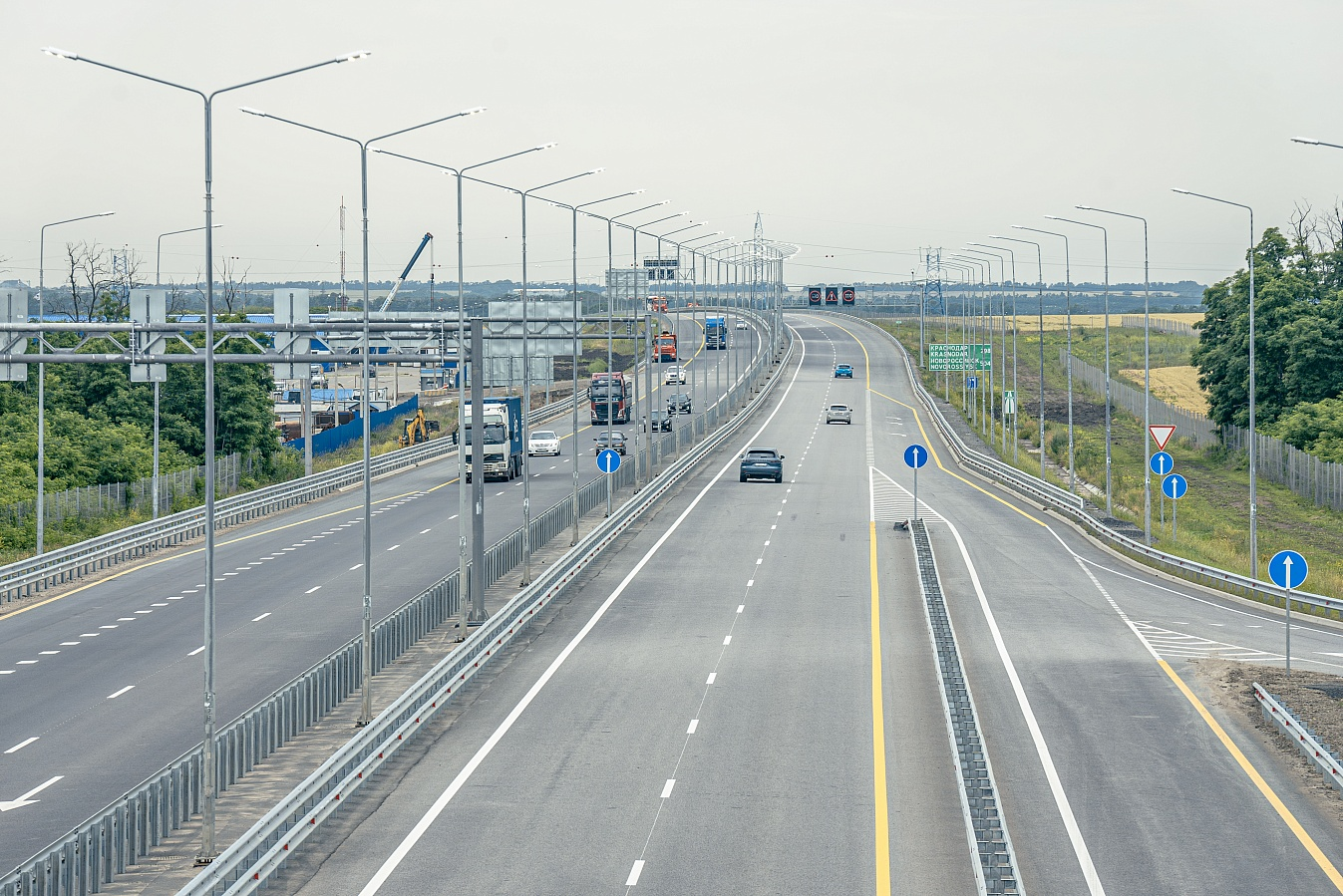
Motorway M4 in Novocherkassk

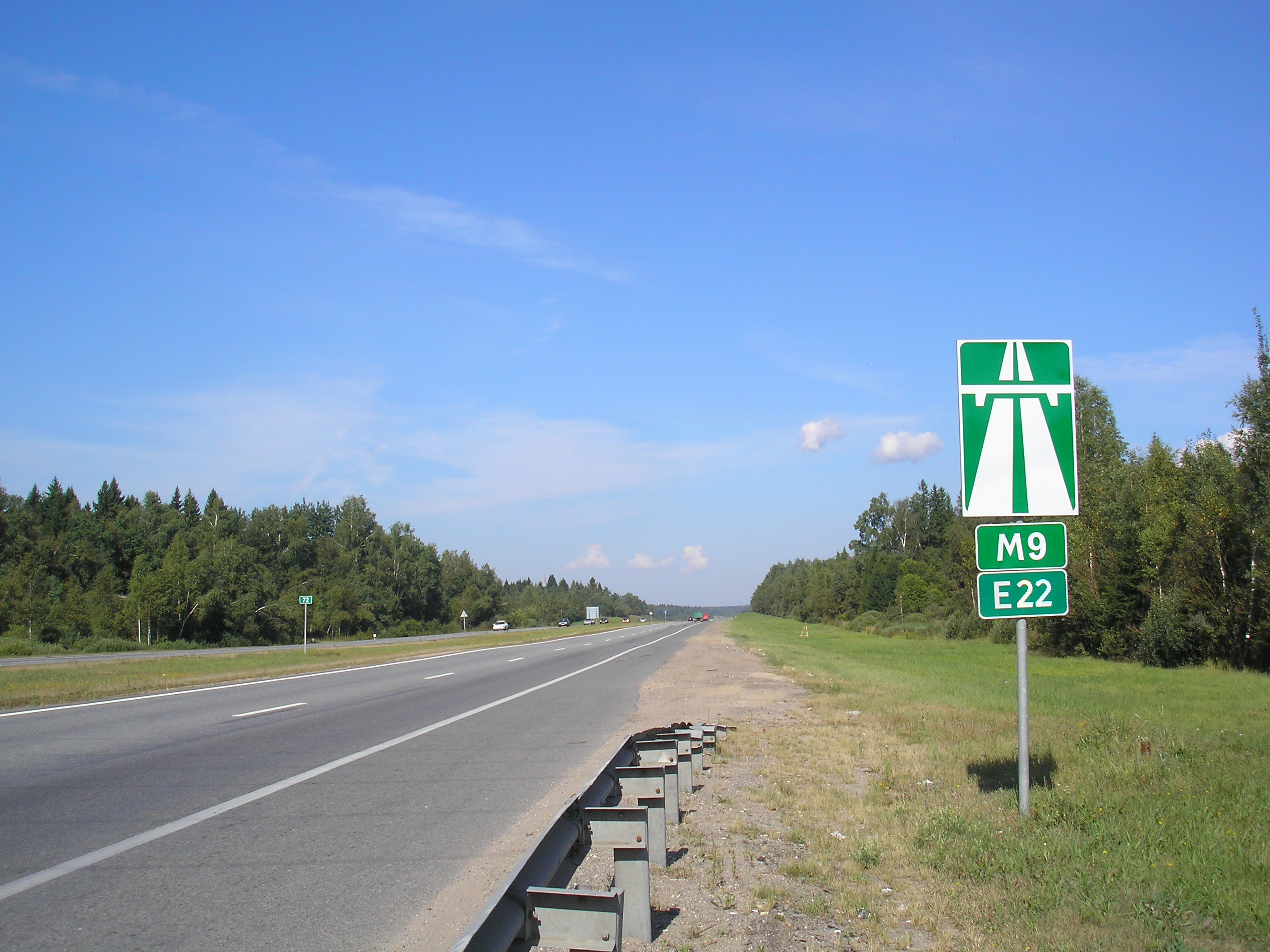
Motorway M9 and European route E22 with green signs

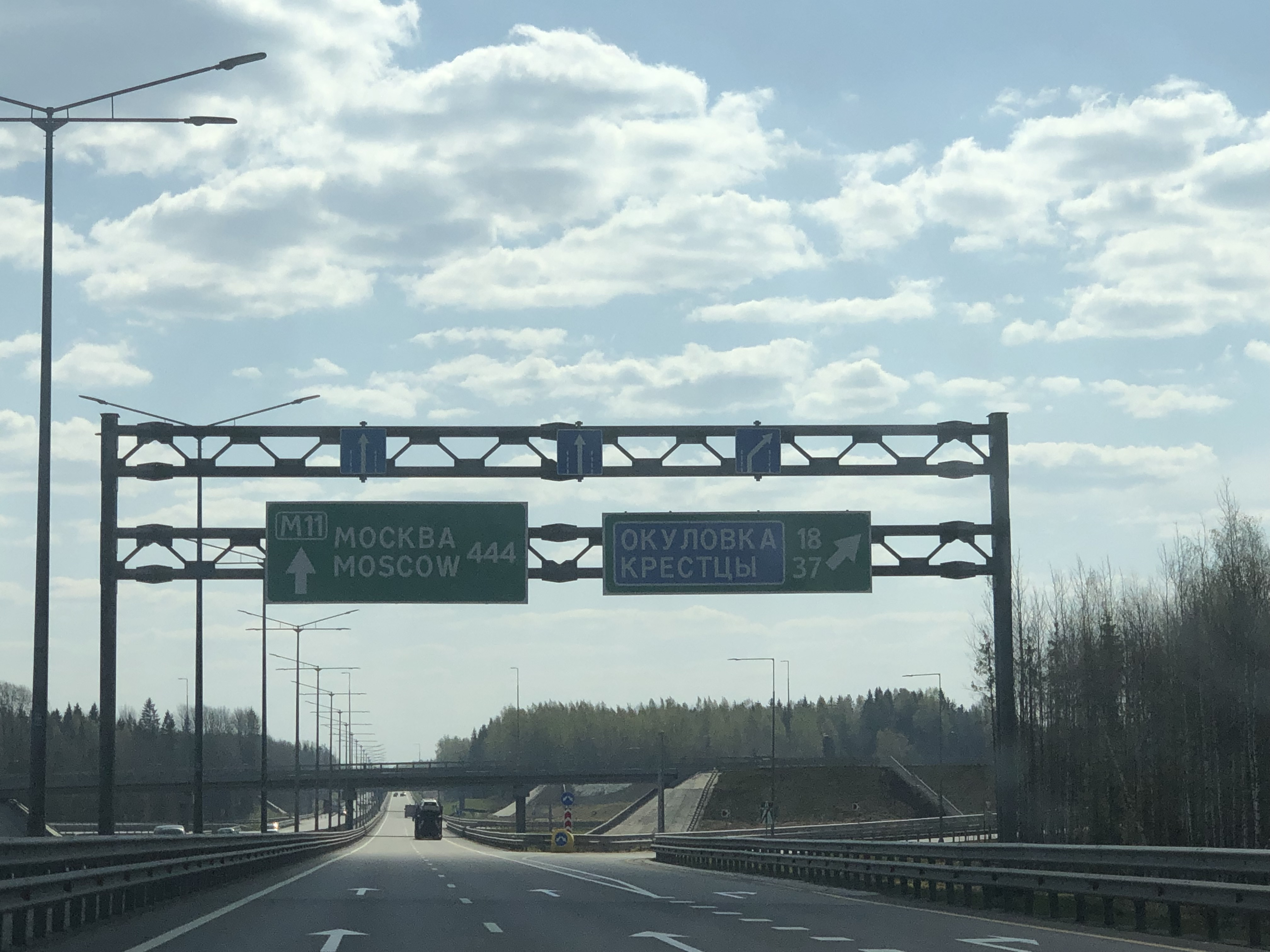
Motorway M11 interchange Okulovka

Motorway M12 interchange Oktyabrsky

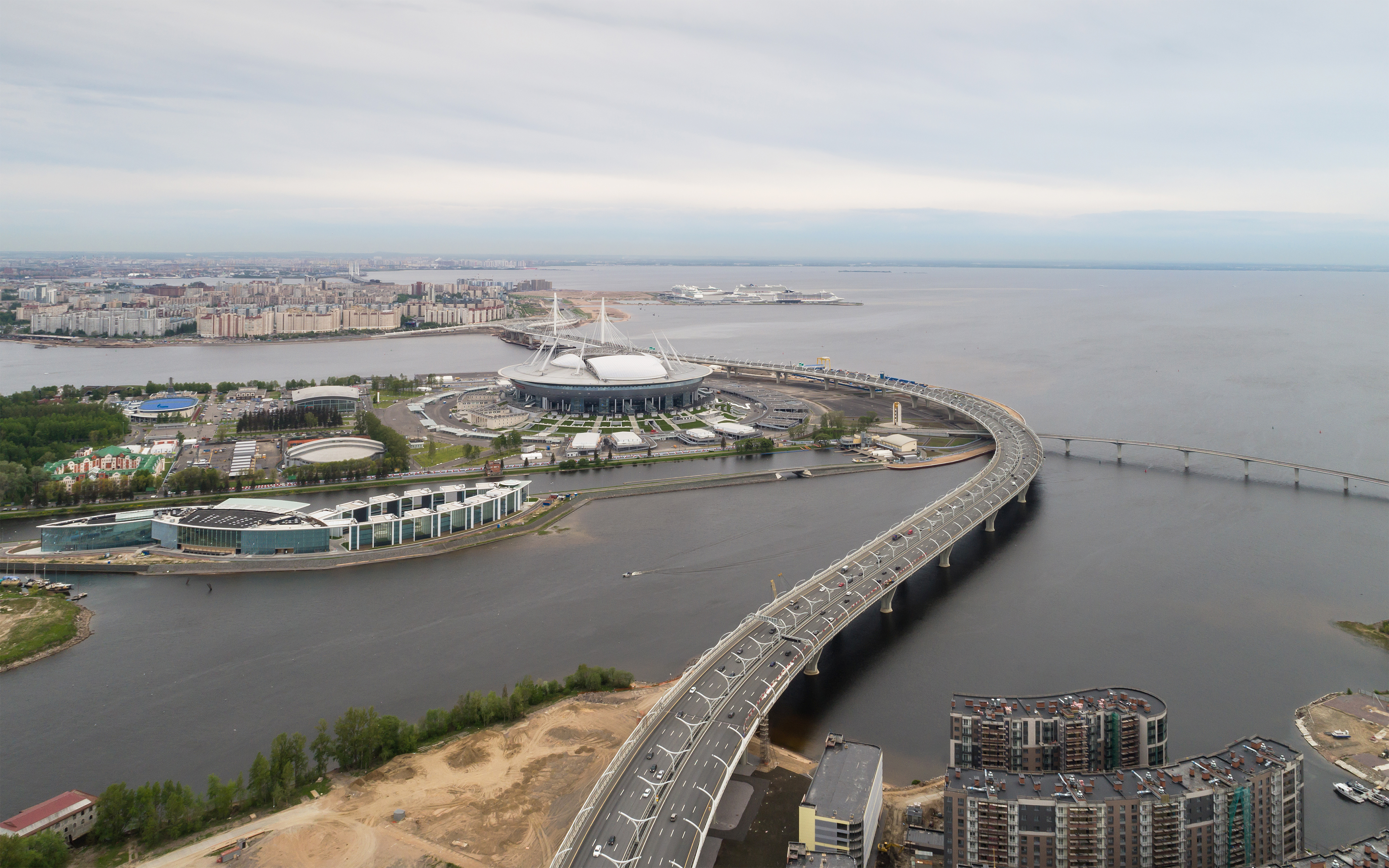
The Western High-Speed Diameter next to the Krestovsky Stadium

==== Serbia ====

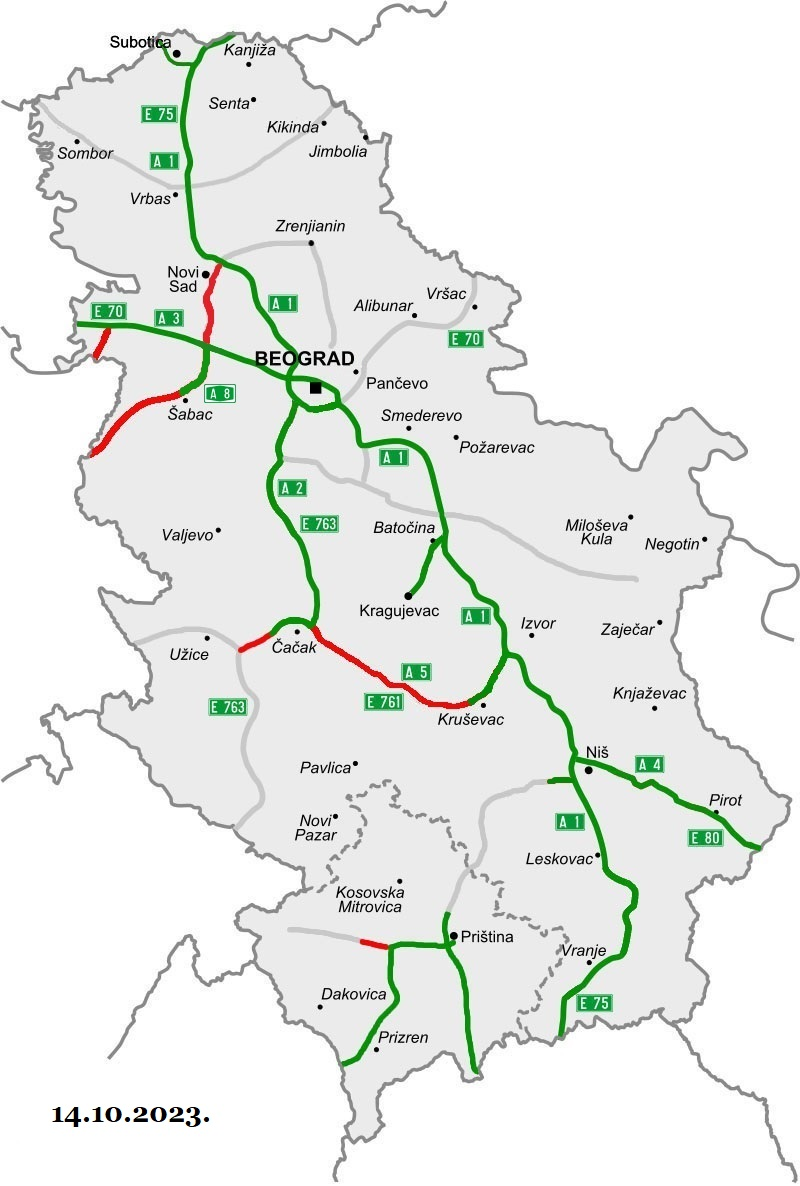
Serbian motorway network finished under construction planned

Motorways (Serbian: Аутопут, romanized: Autoput) and expressways (Serbian: Брзи пут, romanized: Brzi put) are the backbone of the road system in Serbia. As of July 2025 there are 1,048 km (651 mi) of motorways in total.

Motorways in Serbia have three lanes (including emergency lane) in each direction, signs are white-on-green, as in the rest of former Yugoslavia and the normal speed limit is 130 km/h (81 mph).

Expressways, unlike motorways, do not have emergency lanes, signs are white-on-blue and the normal speed limit is 100 km/h (62 mph).

As the Serbian word for motorway is autoput, the "A1", "A2" or "A3" road designations are used since November 2013. All state roads categorized as class I, that are motorways currently of in the future, are marked with one-digit numbers and known as class Ia. All other roads, which belong to class I, are marked with two-digit numbers and known as class Ib. Expressways belong to class Ib, too. E-numeration is also widely used on motorways.

The core of the motorways is what was once called during Yugoslav period, the Brotherhood and Unity Highway, which was opened in 1950 and goes from the border with Croatia, through Belgrade, Central Serbia, Niš, and to border with North Macedonia. It was one of the first modern highways in Central-Eastern Europe. It is the most direct link between Central and Western Europe with Greece and Turkey, and subsequently the Middle-East.

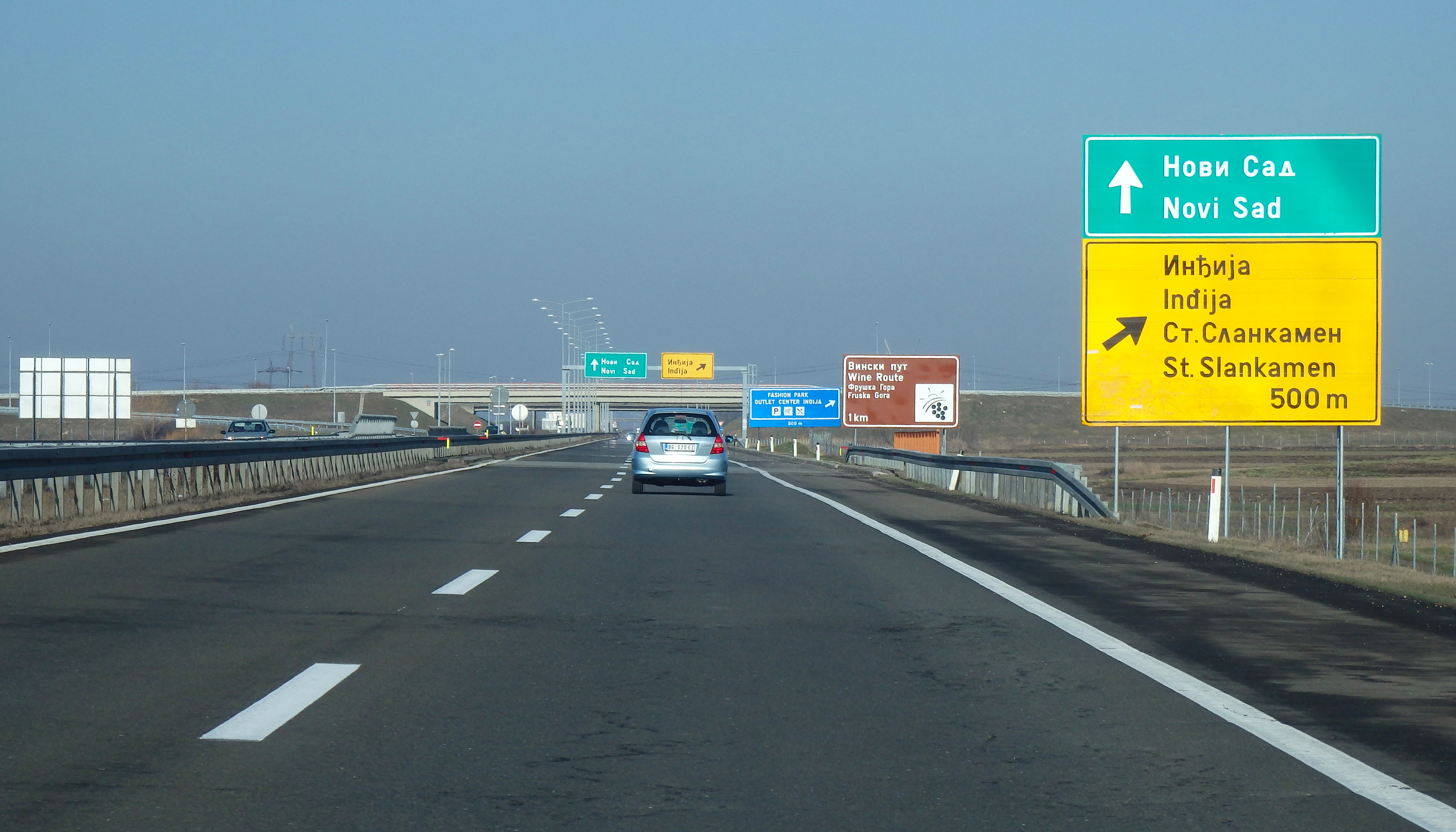
A1/E-75 motorway in Serbia

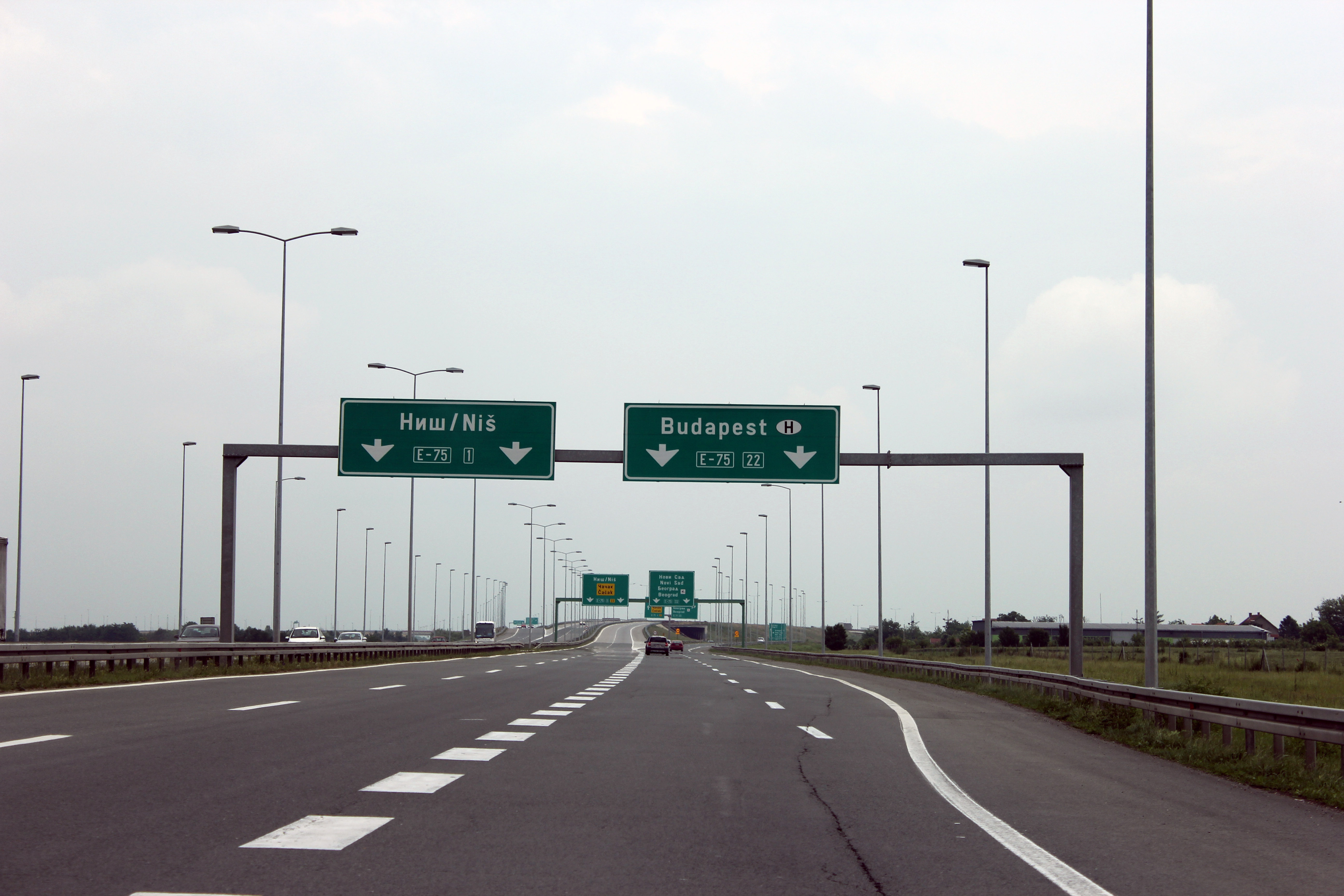
Dobanovci interchange, directions to Niš and Budapest

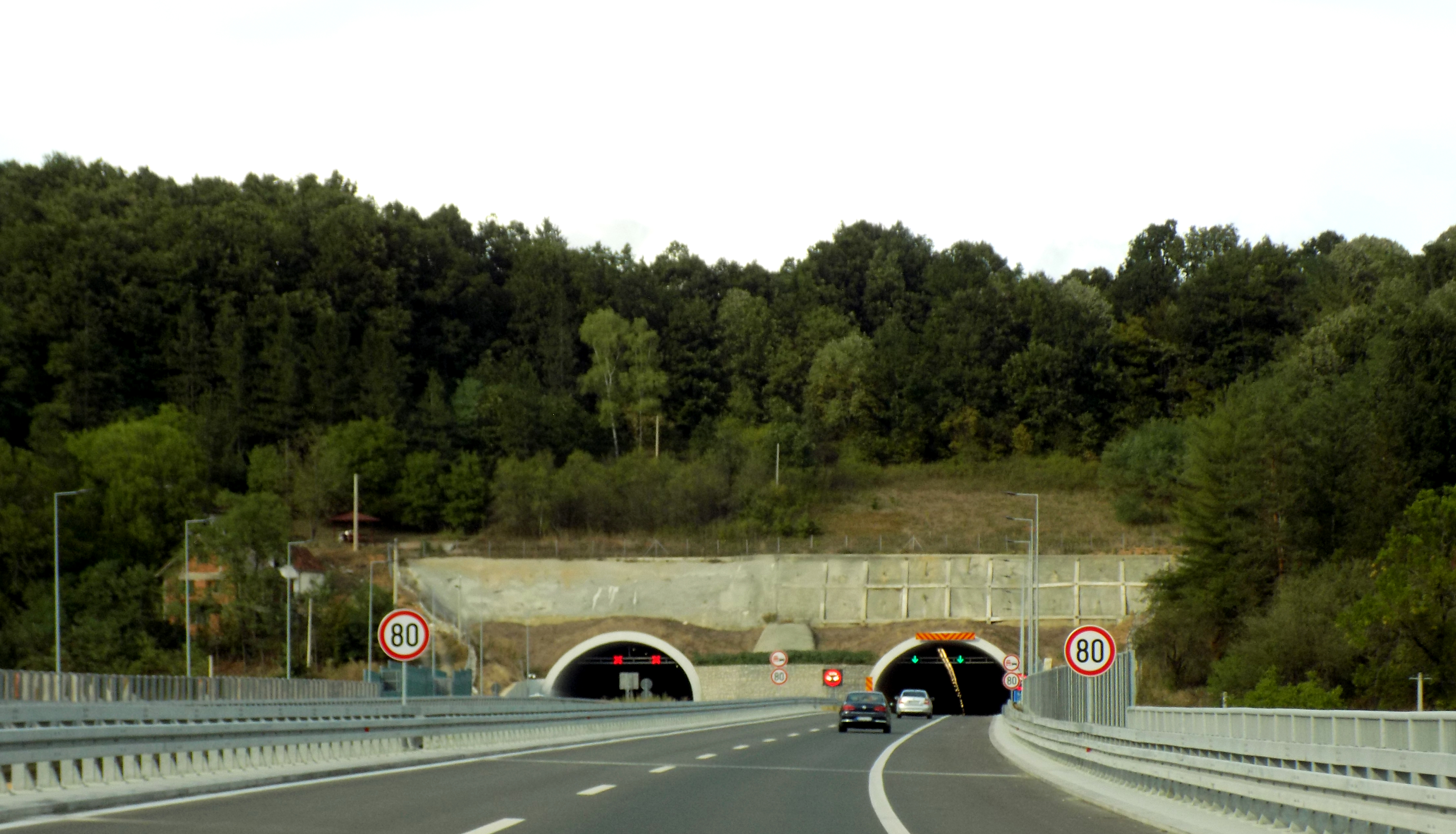
Motorway A2, Tunnel Savinac

==== Slovakia ====

Highway network in Slovakia

Slovakia has currently (2026) 976 km (606 mi) of motorways (Slovak: diaľnica, D) and expressways (rýchlostná cesta, R) whose speed limit is 130 km/h (81 mph). They are split into expressways and motorways with expressways starting with a R, short for "rýchlostná cesta", but from April 2020 all the expressways in Slovakia were known as motorways due to that the expressways are very similar (in terms of restrictions) to the motorways in Slovakia (but even after this change, motorways beginning with an 'R' are still built according to expressway parameters as opposed to being built along motorway parameters) . An e-vignette is paid to use the motorways in Slovakia, while before drives used to pay a sticker vignette, but from 2016 drivers pay electronically through the website.

There is another type of road called road for motor vehicles (Slovak: cesta pre motorové vozidlá) and the speed limits on these roads range from 90 to 130 km/h (56 to 81 mph) (but most are limited to 100 km/h [62 mph]). They are built as dual carriageways with a few sections being single carriageways. Some motorways that are single carriageways are labeled as "roads for motor vehicles".

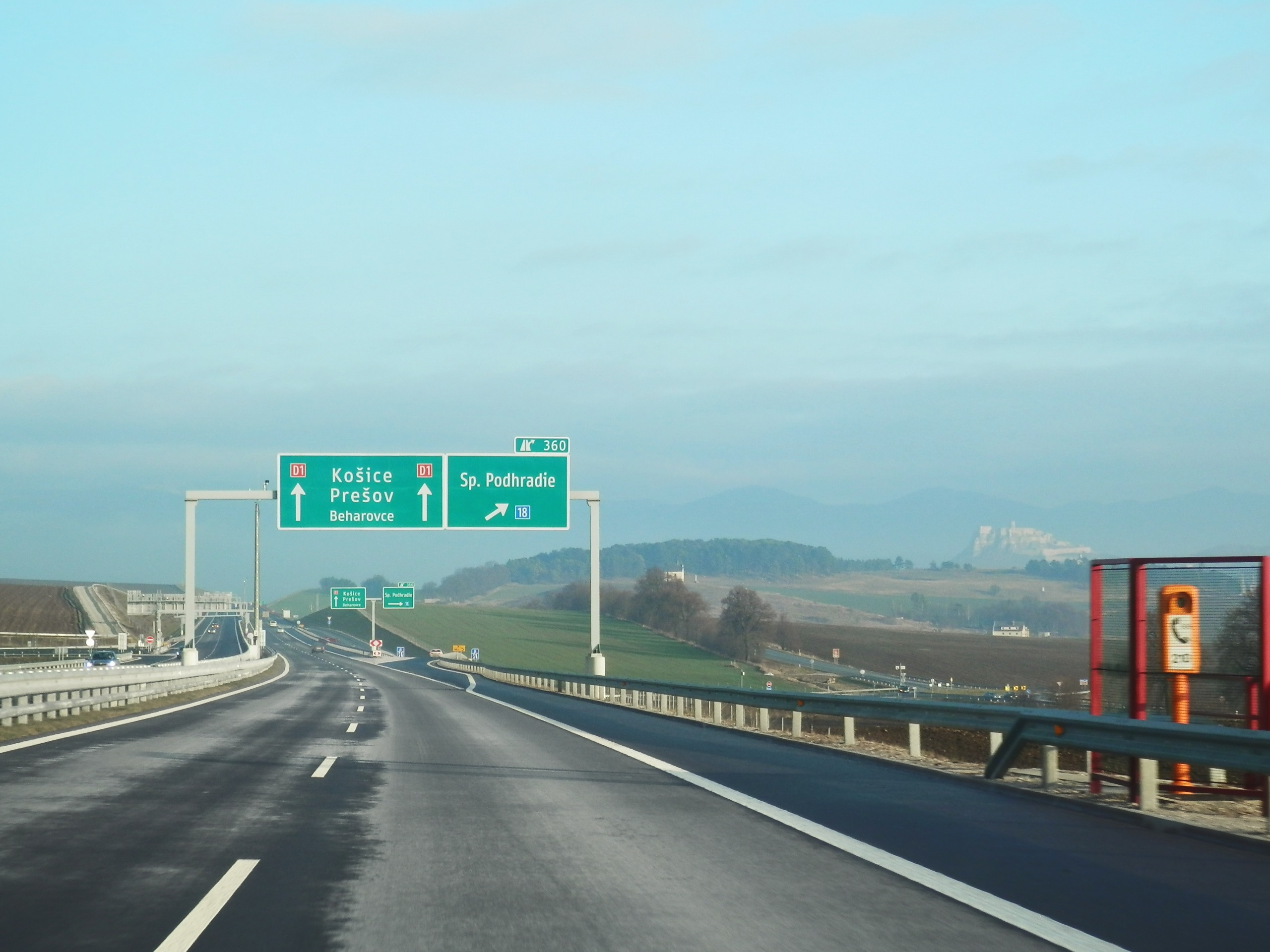
Motorway D1 near Spišské Podhradie with Spiš Castle in the background

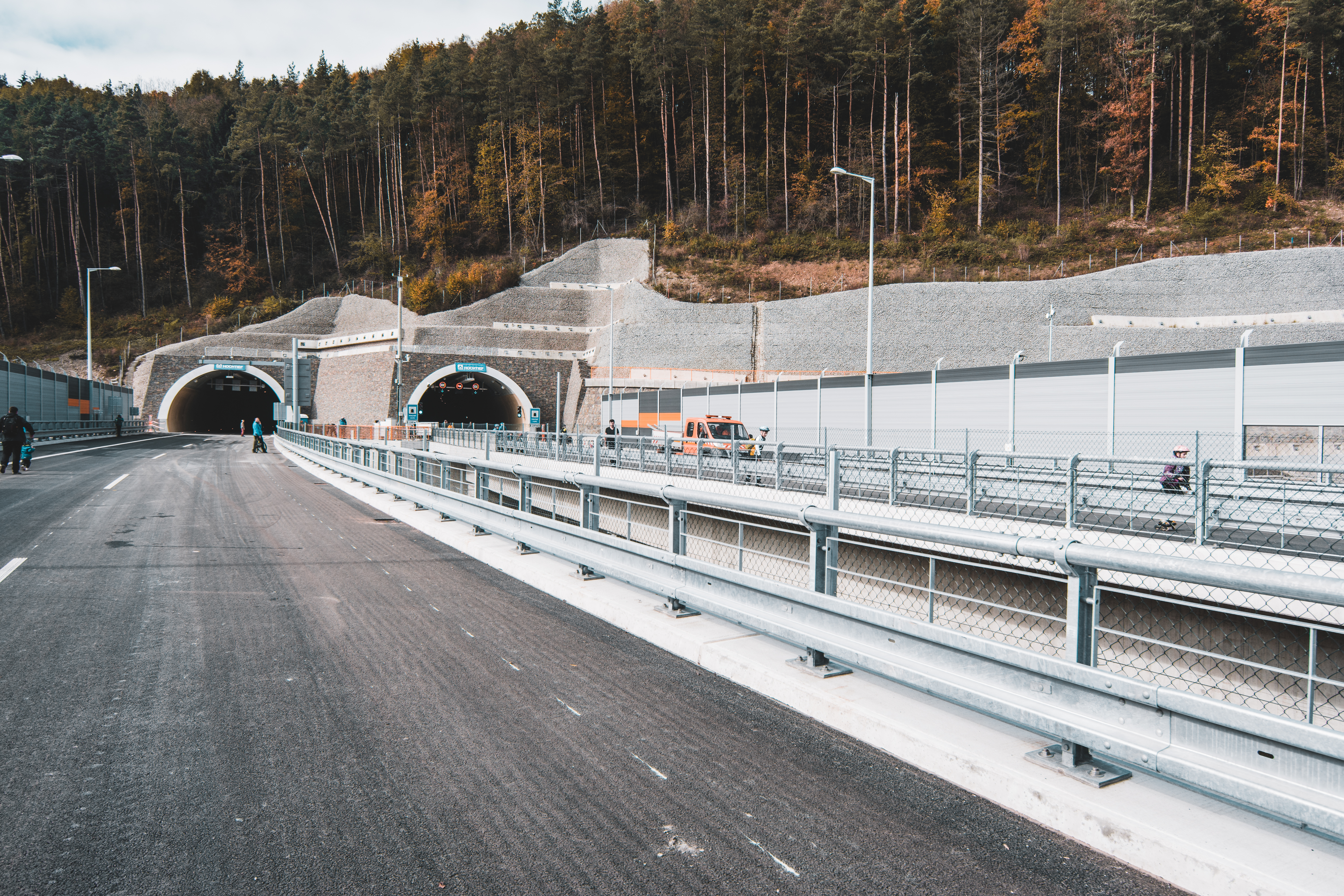
Považský Chlmec Tunnel on D3 before opening

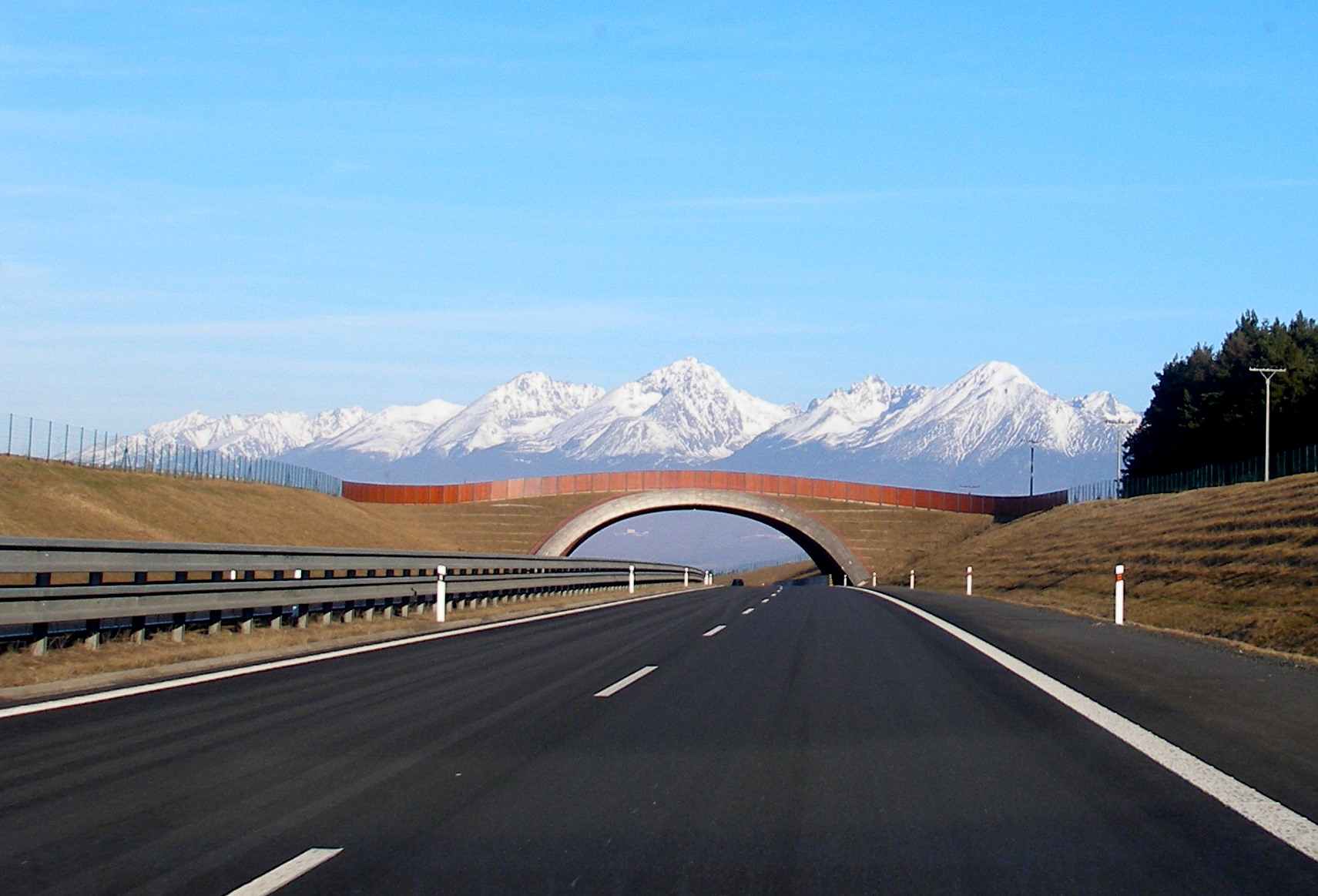
View of the High Tatras from the D1 near Poprad

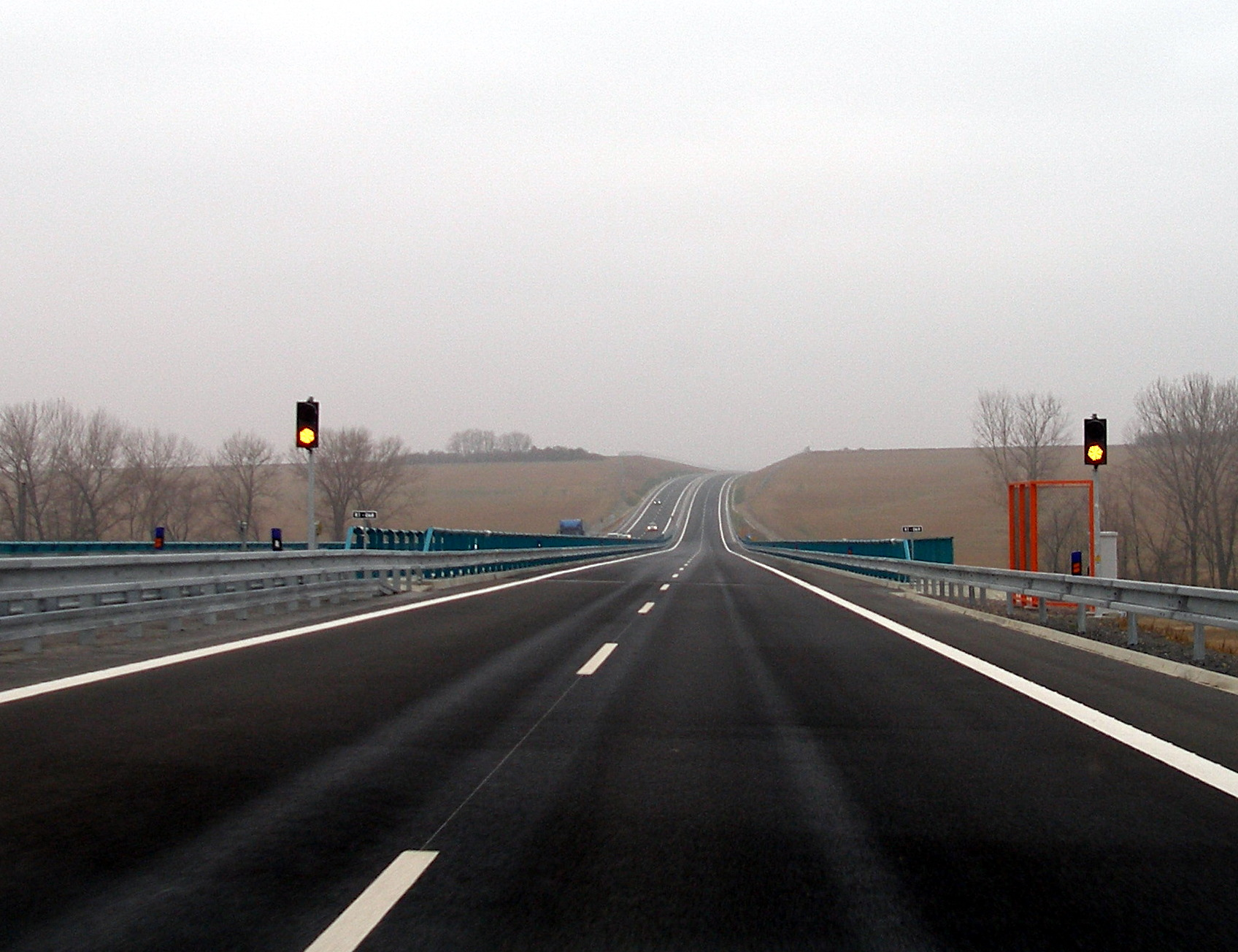
Expressway R1 near Nitra

Old sign for motorways

Old sign for expressways

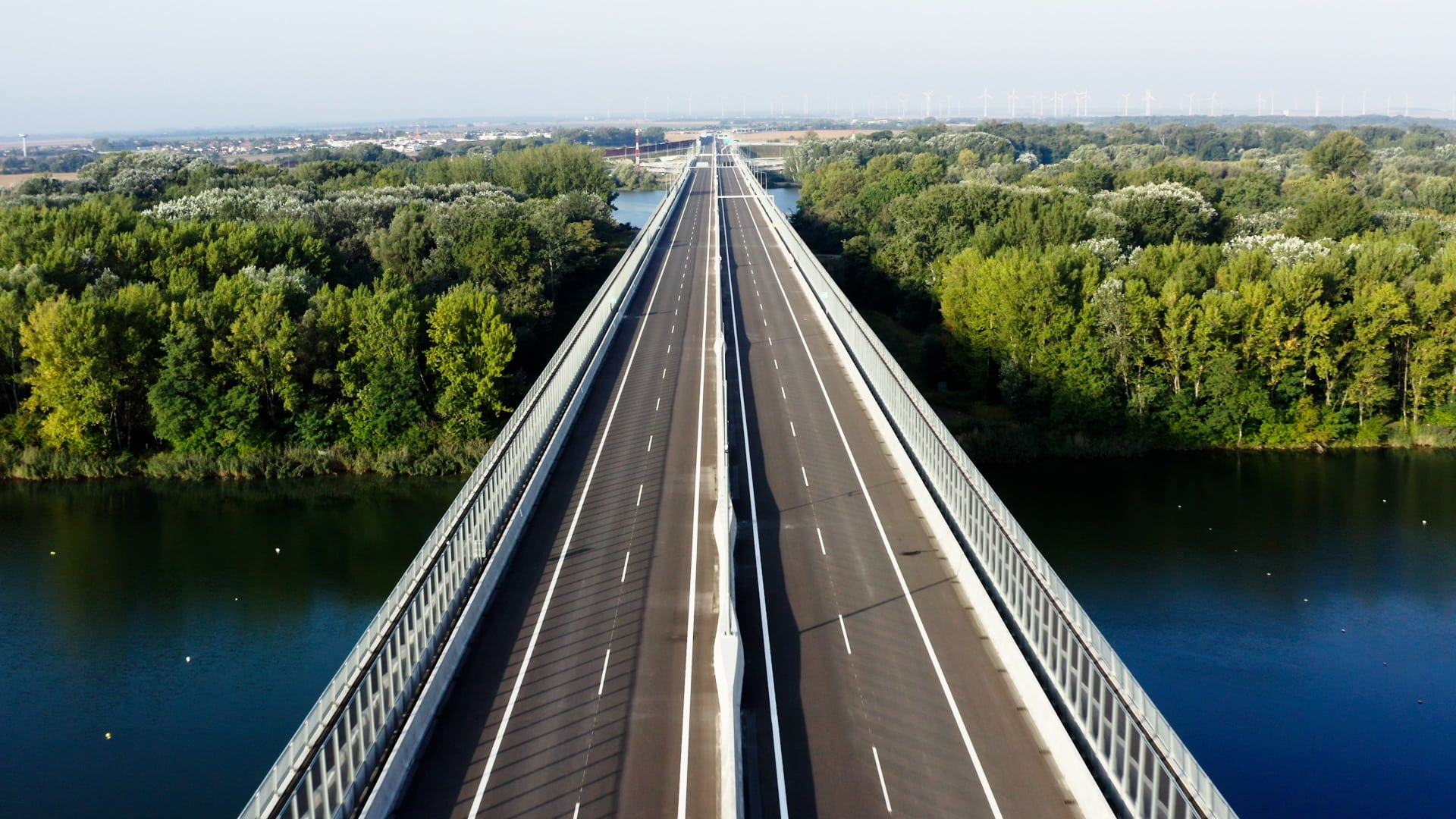
The D4 crossing the Danube river

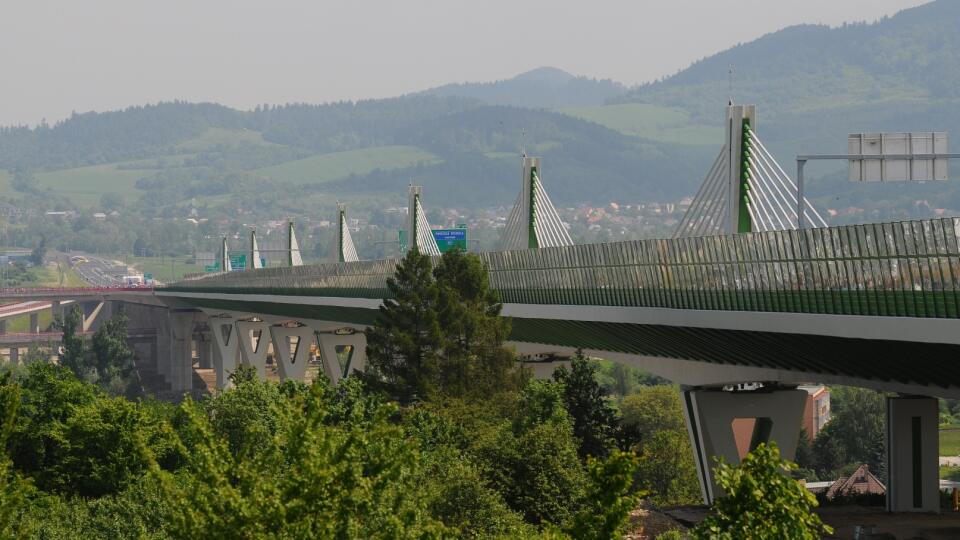
The Považská Bystrica viaduct

==== Slovenia ====

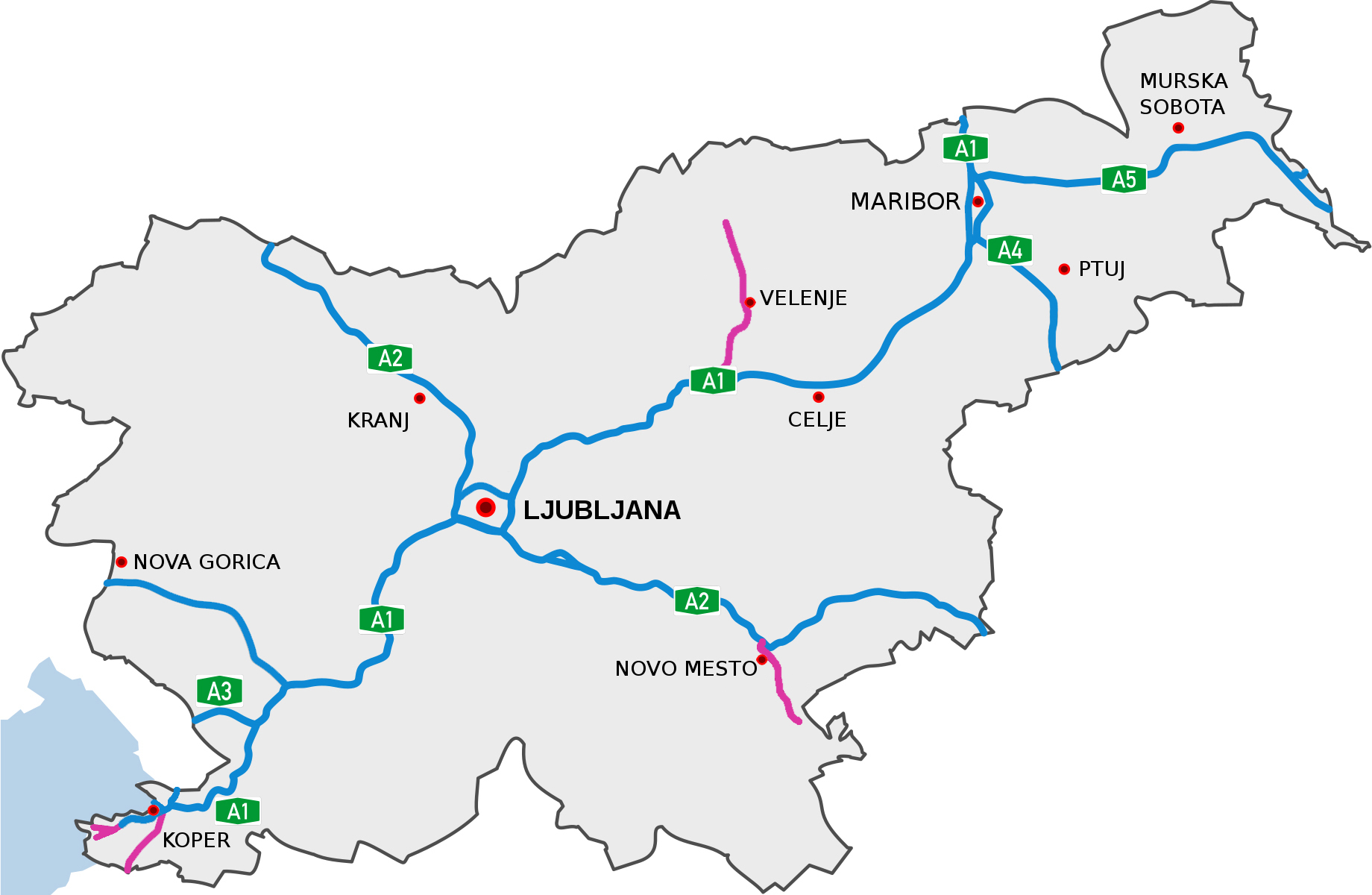
Motorways in Slovenia in use under construction planned

The highways in Slovenia are the central state roads in Slovenia and are divided into motorways (Slovene: avtocesta, AC) and expressways (hitra cesta, HC). Motorways are dual carriageways with a speed limit of 130 km/h (81 mph). They have white-on-green road signs as in Italy, Croatia and other countries nearby. Expressways are secondary roads, also dual carriageways, but without an emergency lane. They have a speed limit of 110 km/h (68 mph) and have white-on-blue road signs.

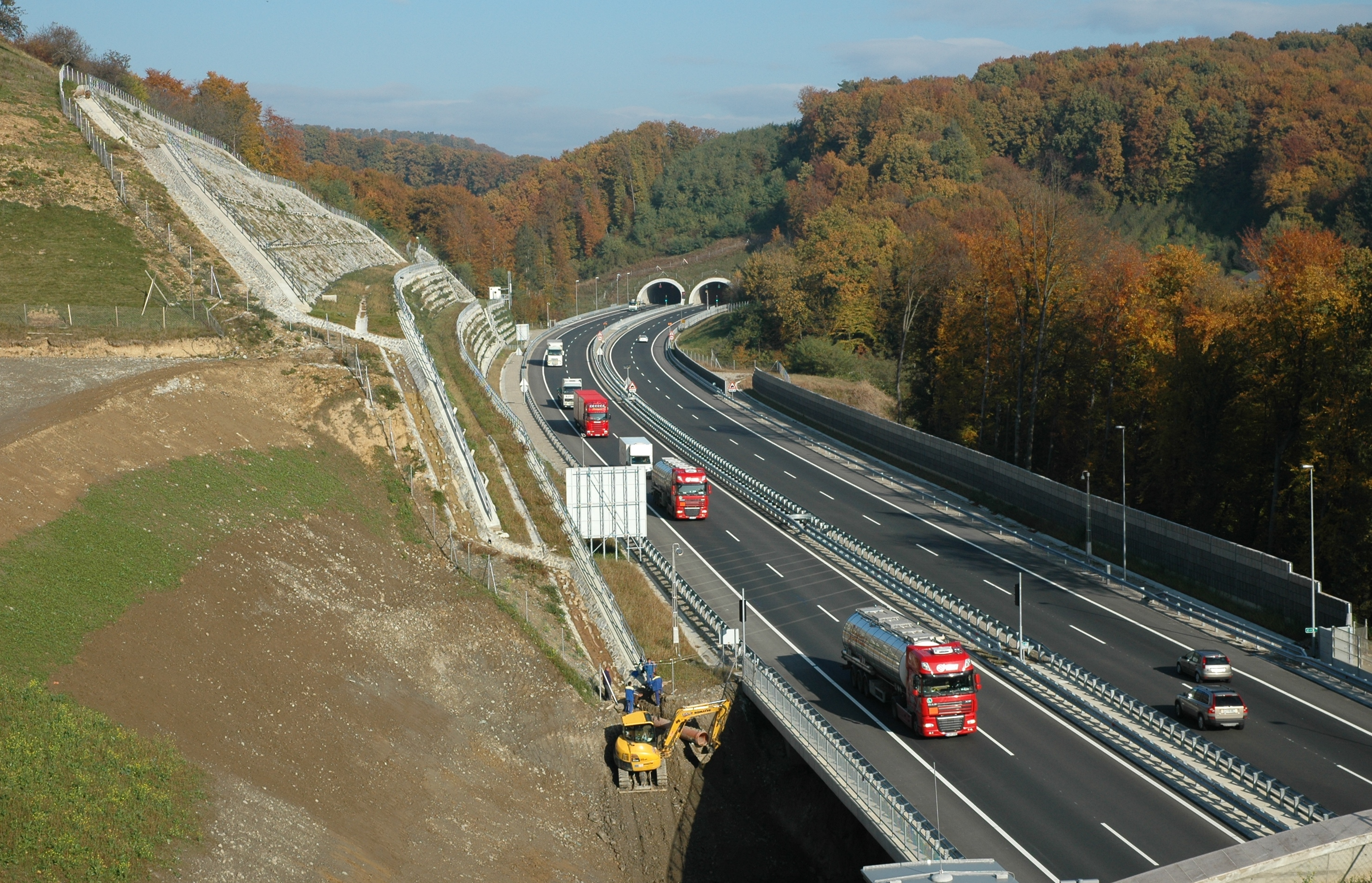
A1 motorway at Vodole

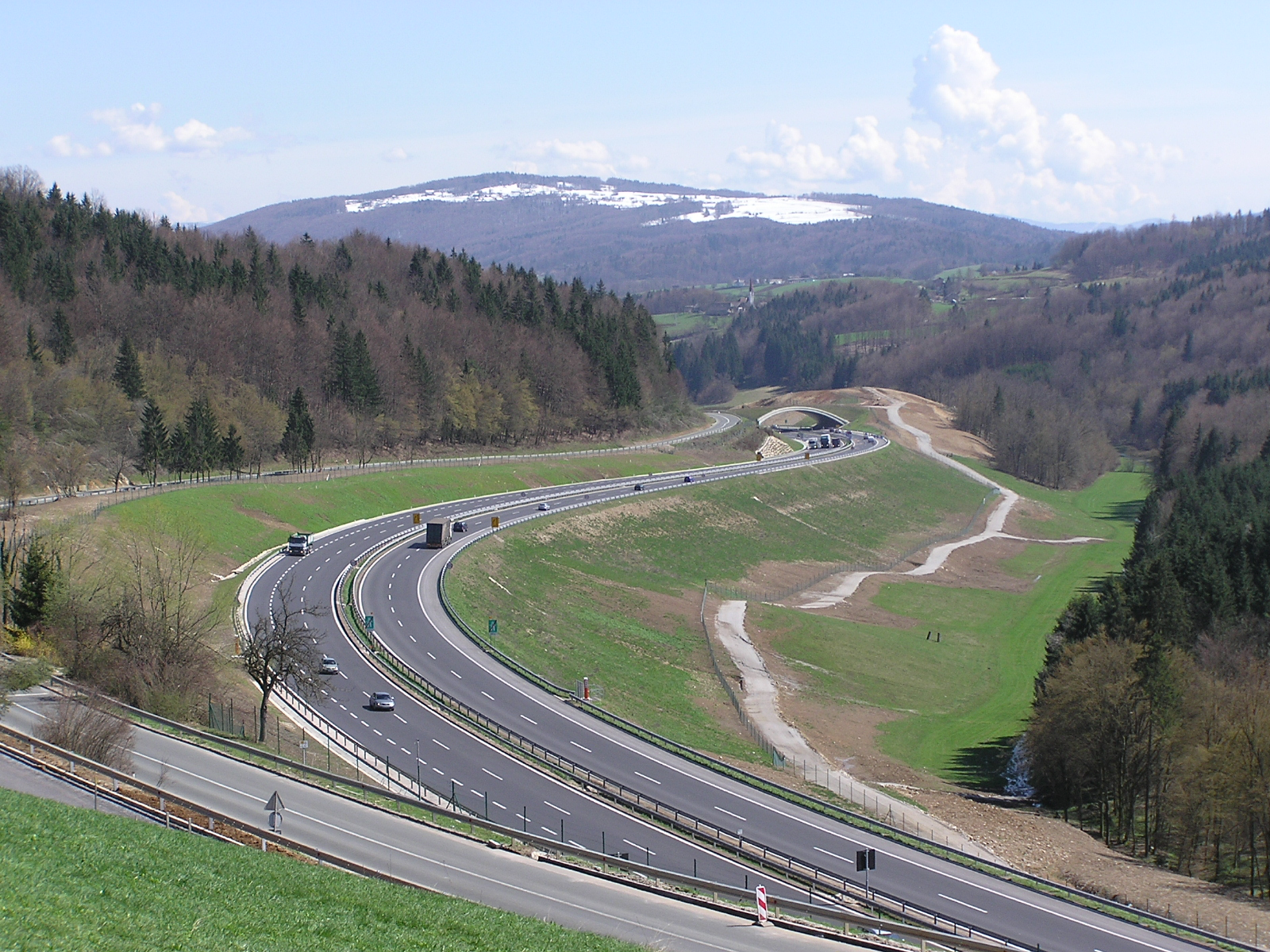
The Medvedjek Slope on the eastern part of the A2 (Lower Carniola)

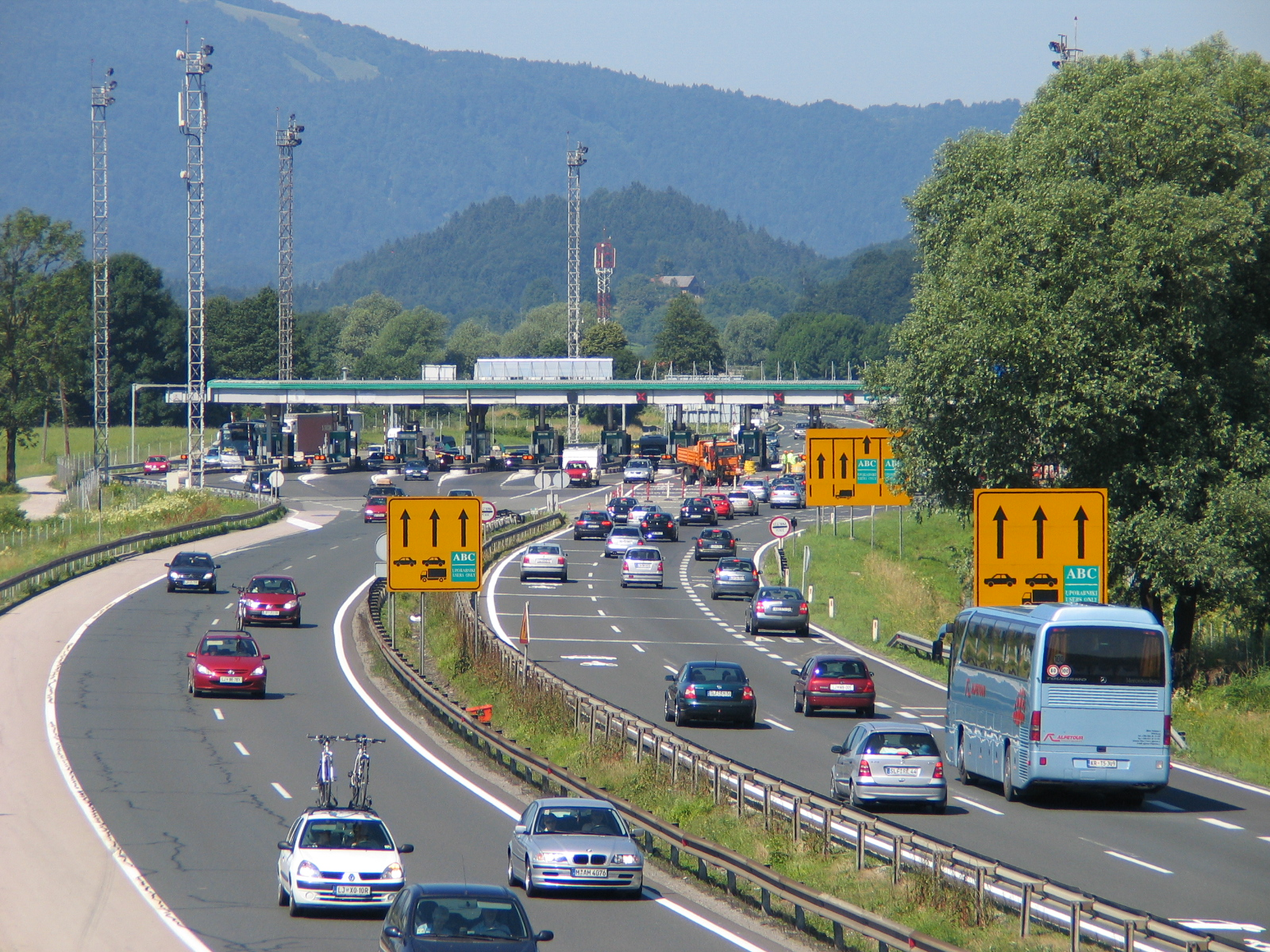
The toll station at Log pri Brezovici

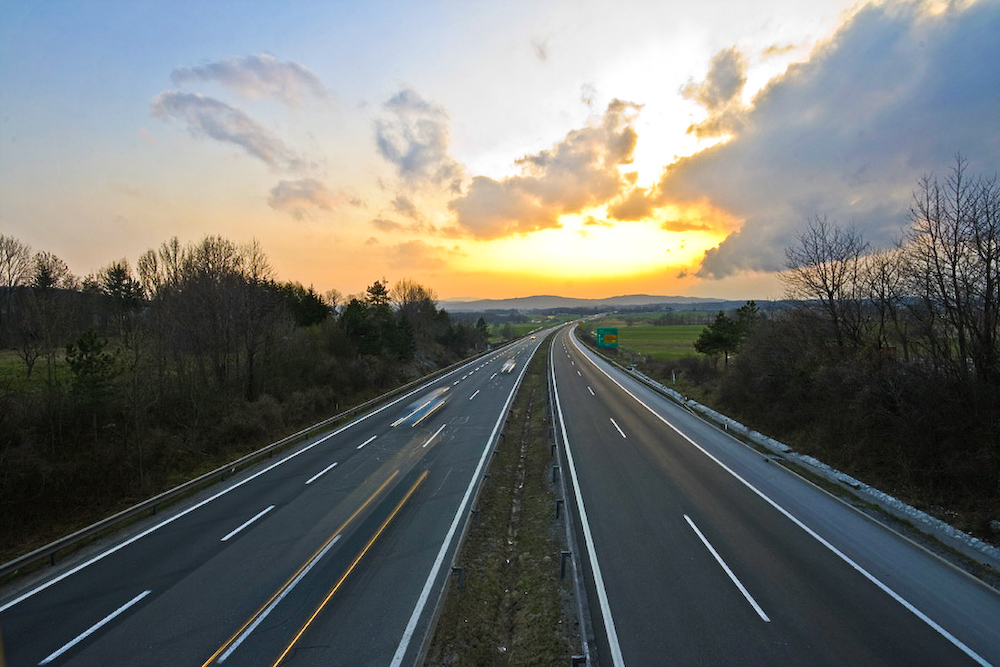
A1 near Postojna

==== Spain ====

Map of Spanish autopistas (motorways) and autovías (expressways)

The Spanish network of autopistas and autovias has a length of 17,228 km (10,705 mi), making it the largest in Europe and the third in the world. Autopistas are specifically reserved for automobile travel, so all vehicles not able to sustain at least 60 km/h (37 mph) are banned from them. General speed limits are mandated by the Spanish Traffic Law as 60–120 km/h (37–75 mph). Specific limits may be imposed based on road, meteorological or traffic conditions. Spanish legislation requires an alternate route to be provided for slower vehicles. Many, but not all, autopistas are toll roads, which also mandates an alternate toll-free route under the Spanish laws.

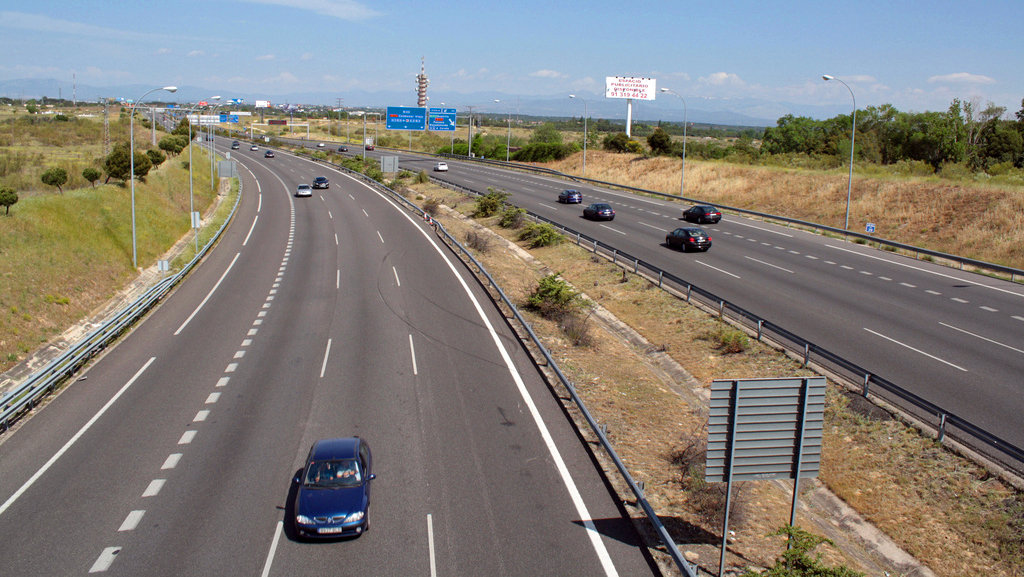
The M-40 autopista (motorway) is one of the beltways serving Madrid. It is one of the few non-toll autopistas of significant length.

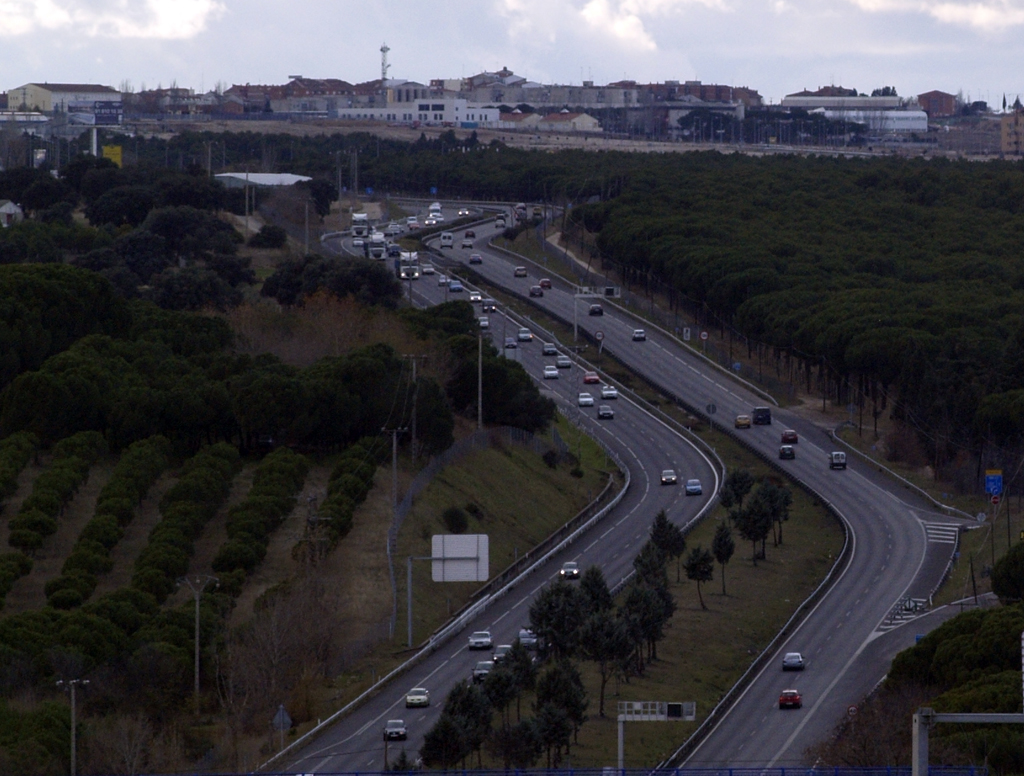
The A-5 autovía (expressway) near Navalcarnero, Madrid. Note the mostly nonexistent acceleration lane in the road joining from the bottom right.

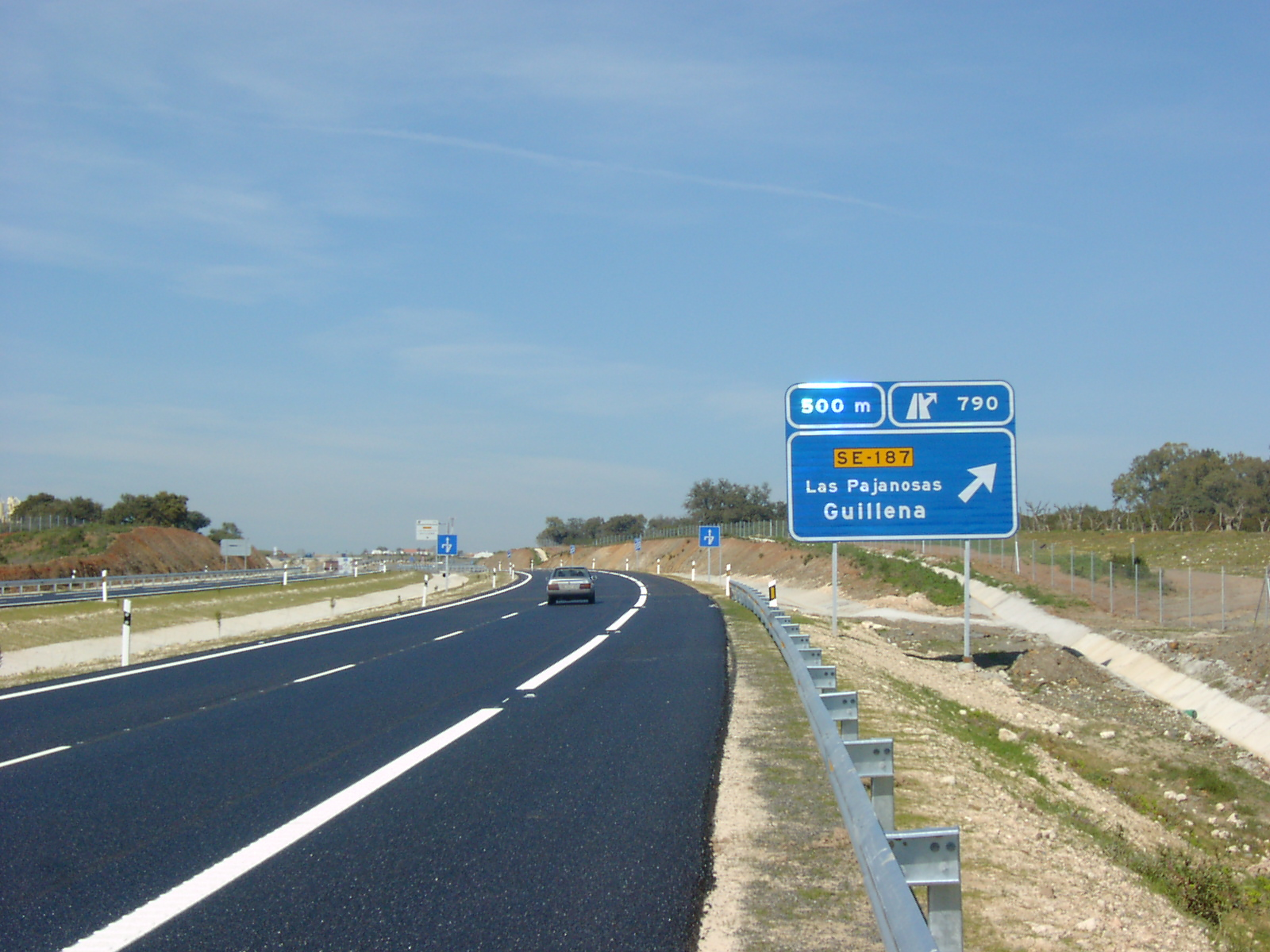
Modern autovías (expressway) such as the A-66 near Guillena, Seville, offer most, if not all, features that are required by an autopista (motorway).

==== Sweden ====

Map of Swedish motorways

Sweden has the largest motorway network in Scandinavia (2,050 kilometres, 1,274 mi). It is, however, unevenly allocated. Most motorways are located in the south of the country, where the population density is the highest.

The first motorway in Sweden opened in 1953, between Lund and Malmö. Four-lane expressways had been built before, an early example is E20 between Gothenburg and Alingsås, built in the early 1940s. Most of the current network was built in the 1970s and 1990s.

E6 starts i Trelleborg in southern Sweden, it then continues along the Swedish western coast, up to the Svinesund bridge which is where Sweden borders to Norway. Its length is close to 600 km (370 mi) on Swedish territory alone, and it connects four of Scandinavia's six largest cities, Copenhagen, Malmö, Gothenburg and Oslo together, as well as around 20 other more or less notable towns and cities.

A Swedish (partly motorway) route (rather than road) that also has a significant portion of the Swedish motorway network, is European route E4, which runs from the border city of Tornio in northern Finland to Helsingborg in southern Sweden. E4 is the main route that connects the capital Stockholm with Scania. All of E4 south of the city Gävle is of motorway standard. The part of E4 that runs through western Stockholm is called Essingeleden and is the busiest road in Sweden.

Other highways that have a significant portion of motorway standard are E20, E18 and E22. Motorways in Sweden are however not restricted to European routes; so called Riksvägar and other regional road types can also be of motorway standard. An example of this is Riksväg 40. Riksväg 40 is the main link between the largest cities in the country, Stockholm and Gothenburg. Notably, not even the majority of the European route- network in Sweden is motorway or even have expressway standard. All of this is because road numbering and road standard is separate in Sweden, as in the rest of Scandinavia.

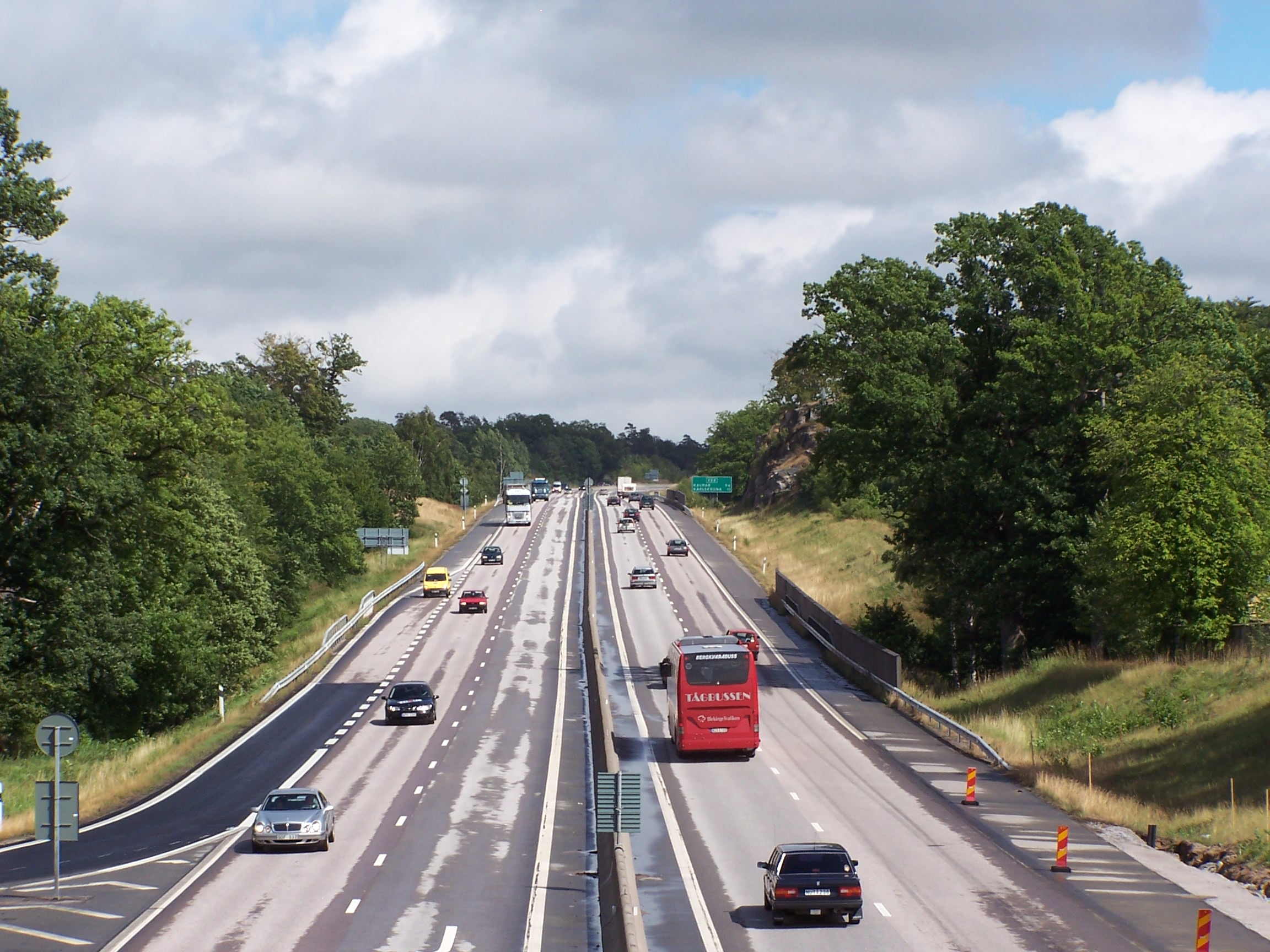
E22 Motorway westbound towards Karlskrona

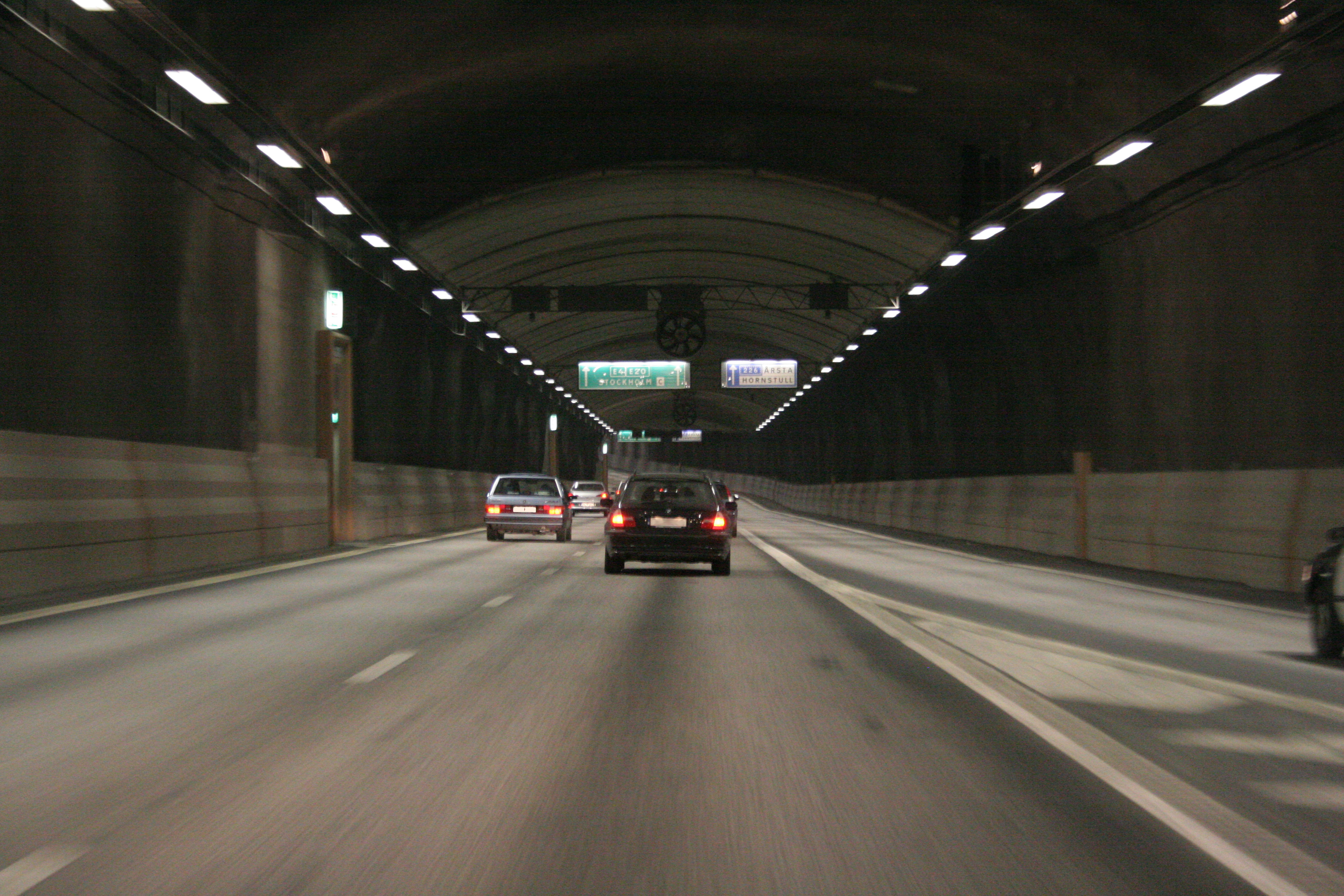
The Södra länken Rv-75 ring road in Stockholm

==== Switzerland ====

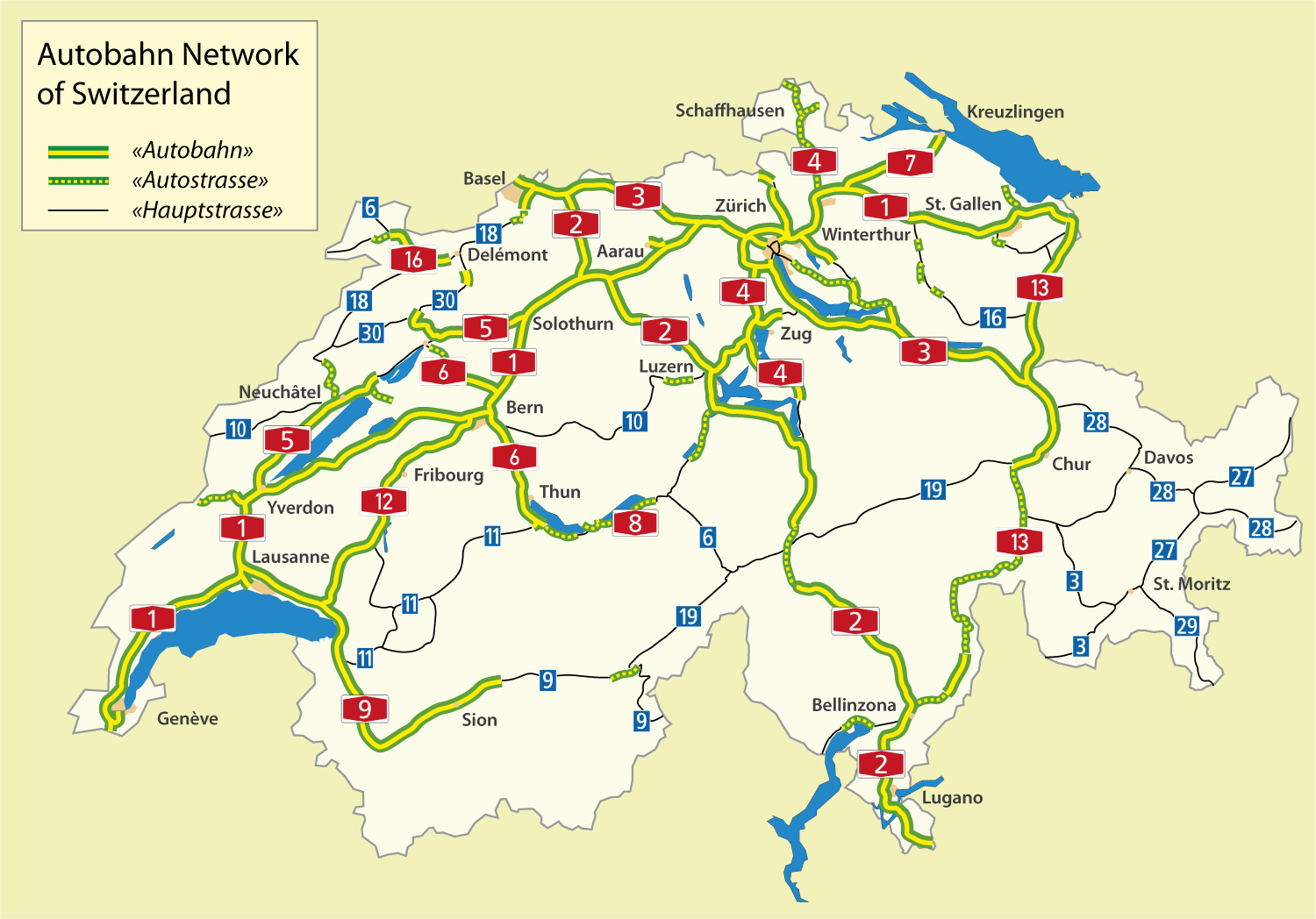
Swiss highway network

Switzerland has a two-class highway system: motorways with separated roads for oncoming traffic and a standard maximal speed limit of 120 km/h (75 mph), and expressways often with oncoming traffic and a standard maximal speed limit of 100 km/h (62 mph).

In Switzerland as of April 2011, there were 1,763.6 kilometres (1,095.9 mi) of a planned 1,893.5 kilometres (1,176.6 mi) of motorway completed. The country is mountainous with a high proportion of tunnels: there are 220 totalling 200 kilometres (120 mi), which is over 12% of the total motorway length.

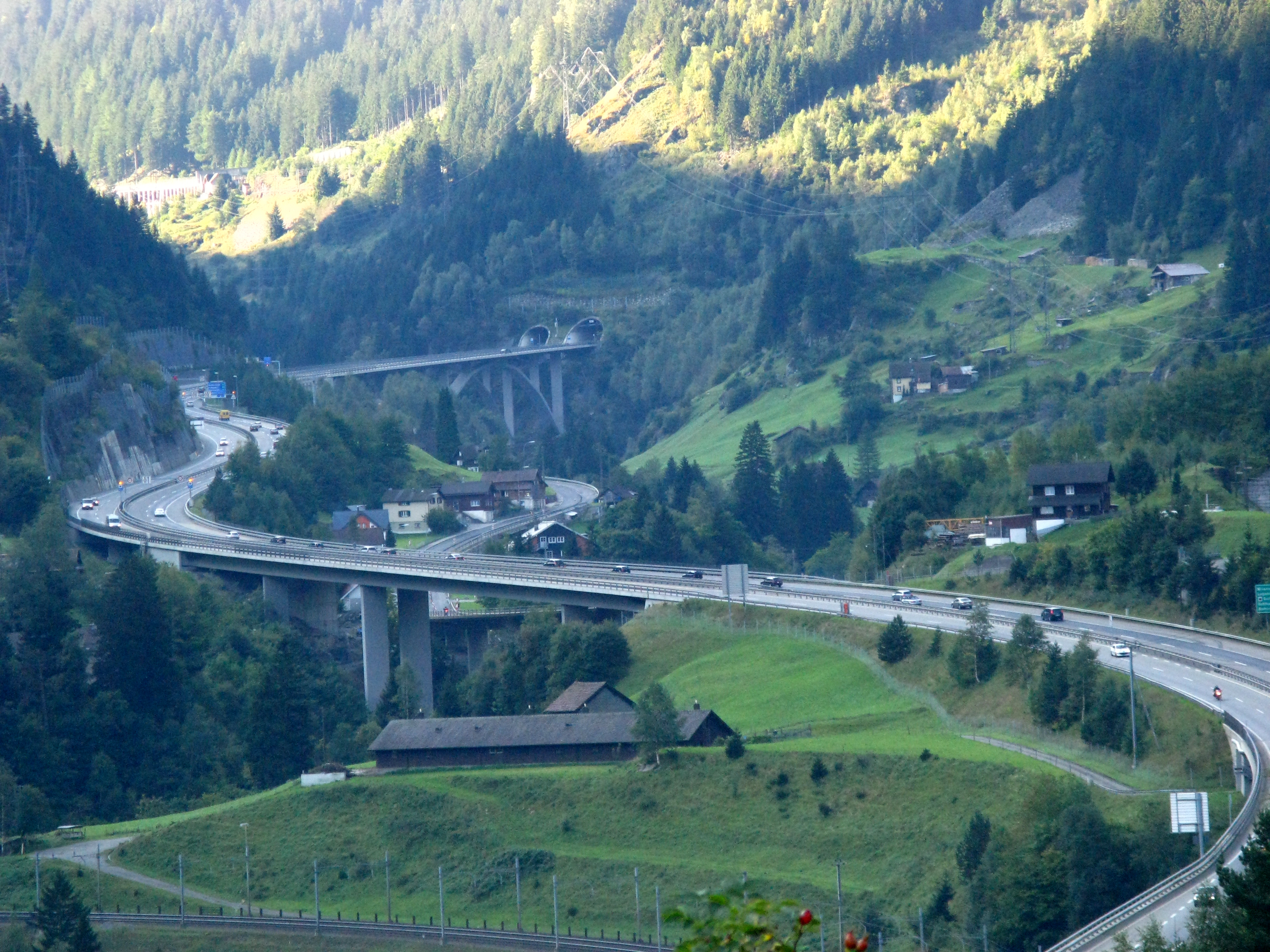
Autobahn A2 near the northern portal of the Gotthard tunnel

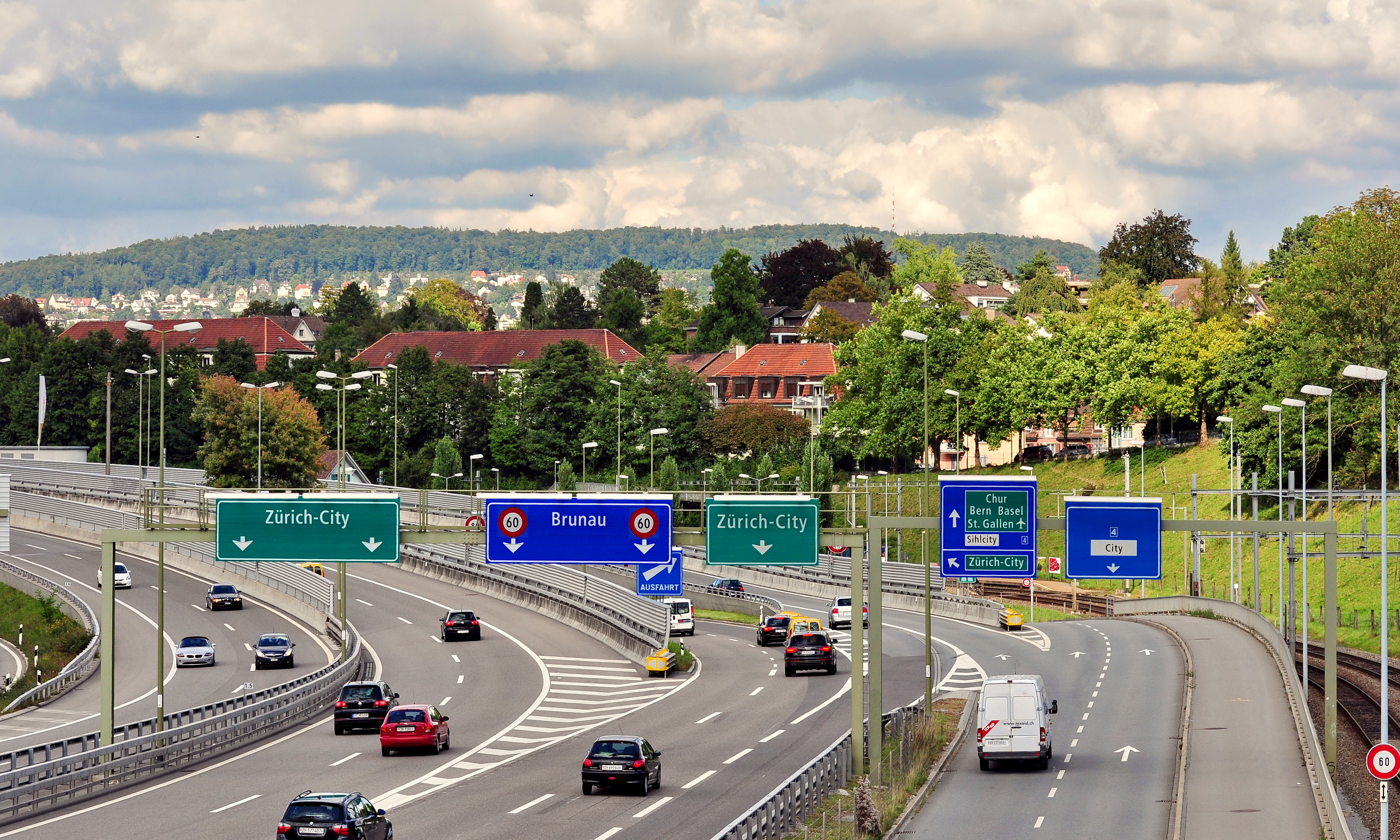
A3 in Zürich

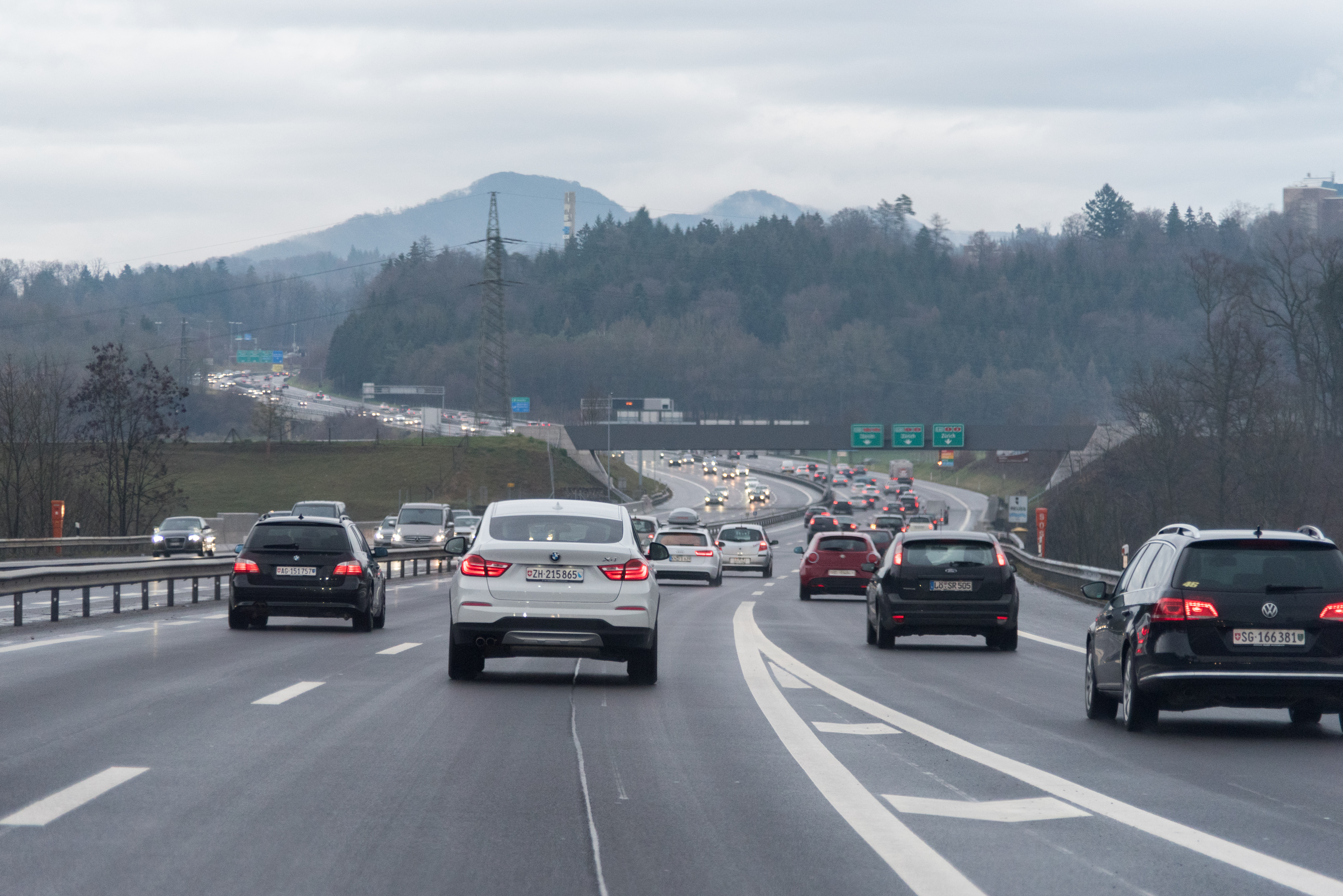
Autobahn A1/A3 near Birrfeld

==== Turkey ====

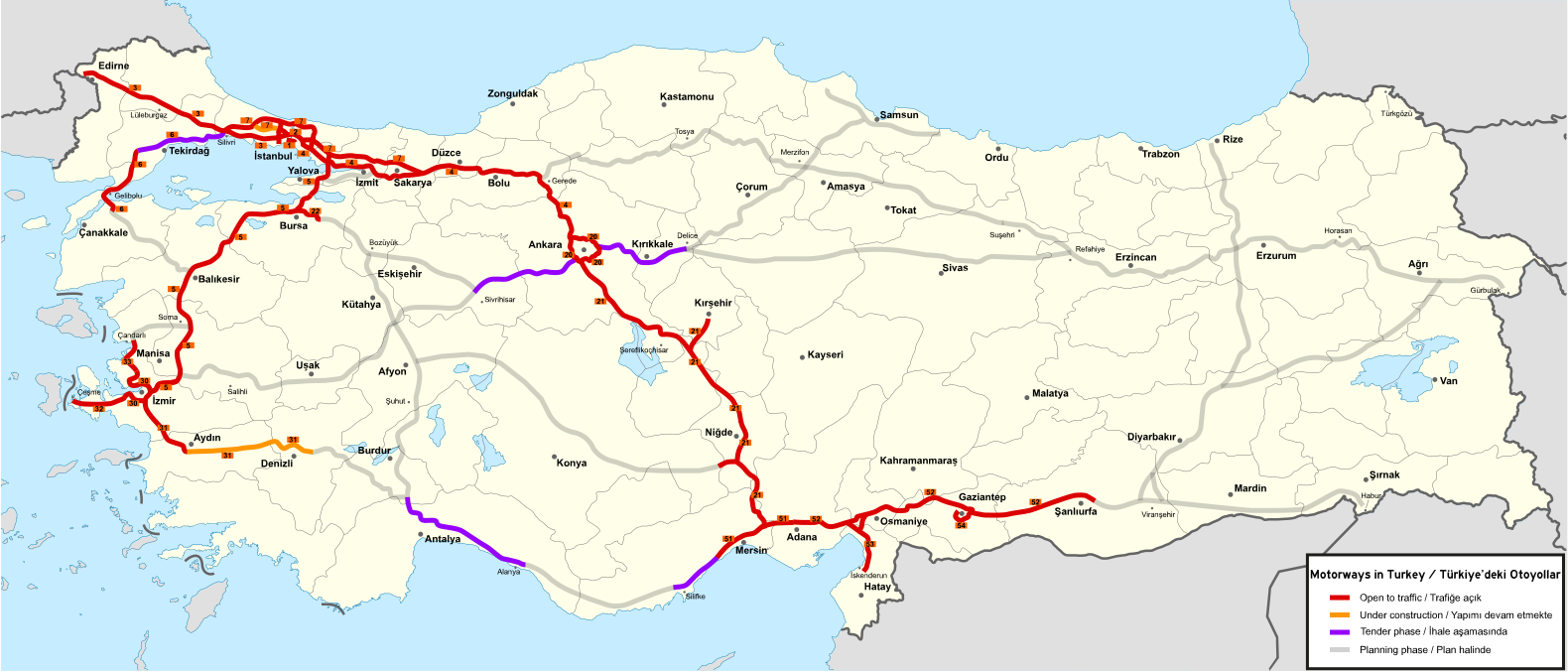
Motorways in Turkey

Motorways (Turkish: Otoyol) of Turkey are a network in constant development. All motorways (O coded), except beltways, are toll roads (using only RFID methods for the roads that operated by KGM; cash and credit card payment is also possible for the roads that operated by private companies), mostly six lanes wide, illuminated and with 130 or 140 km/h (81 or 87 mph) speed limit. As of 2024, total length of the motorways is 3,726 km (2,315 mi) long in total.

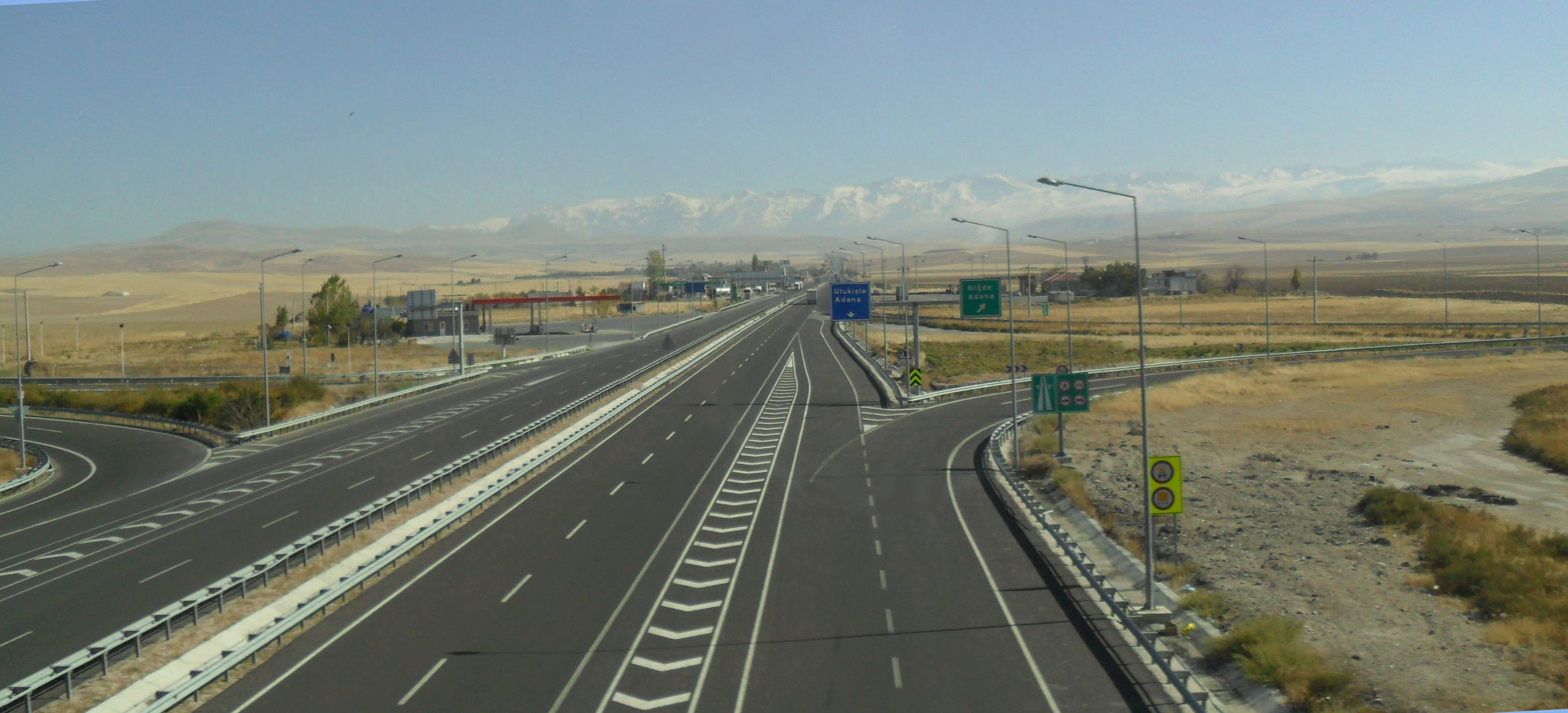
D.750 at Konya junction. Toros Mountains in the background.

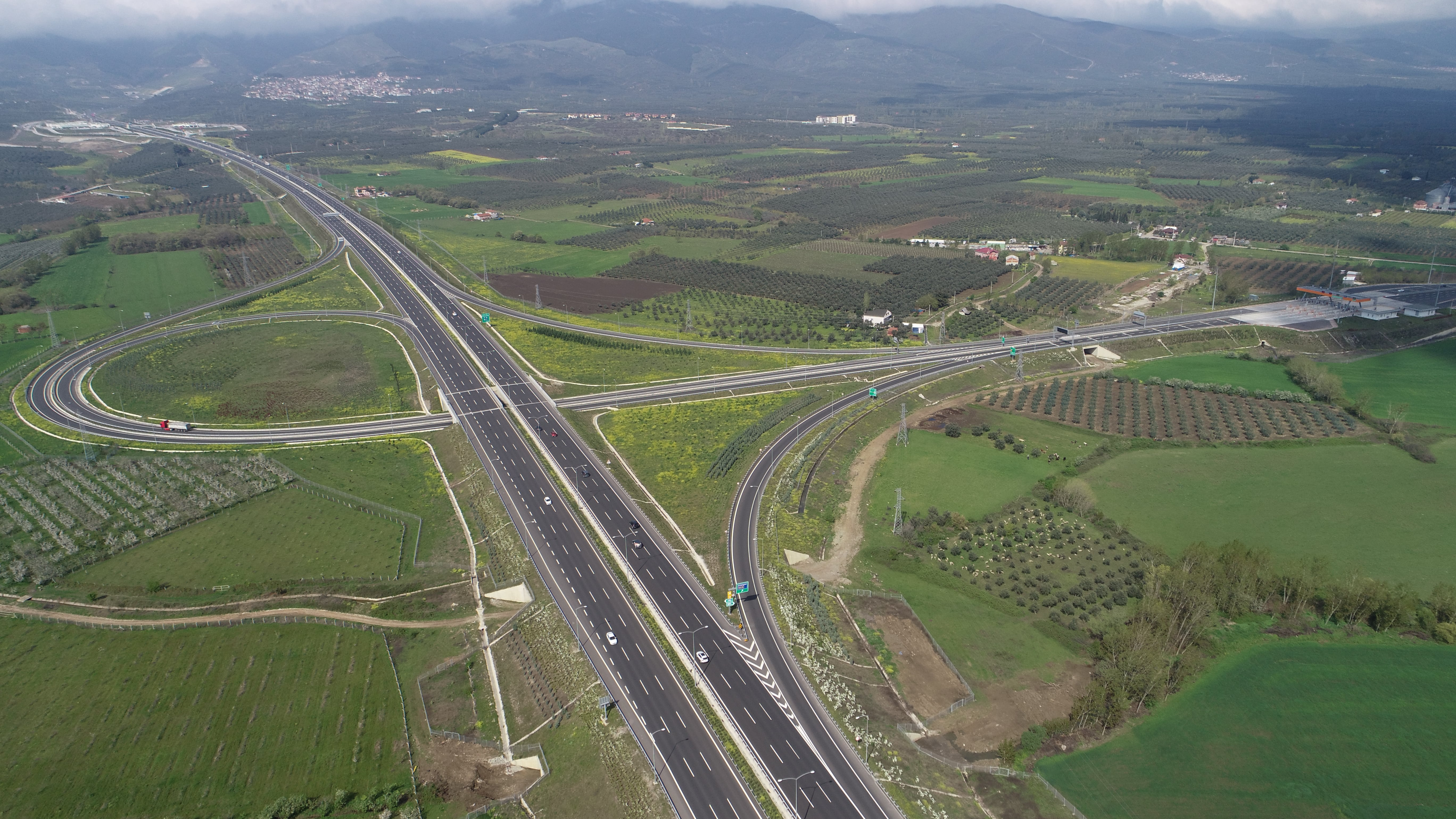
Orhangazi Junction in Bursa, O-5

==== United Kingdom ====

Motorways of the United Kingdom

===== Great Britain =====
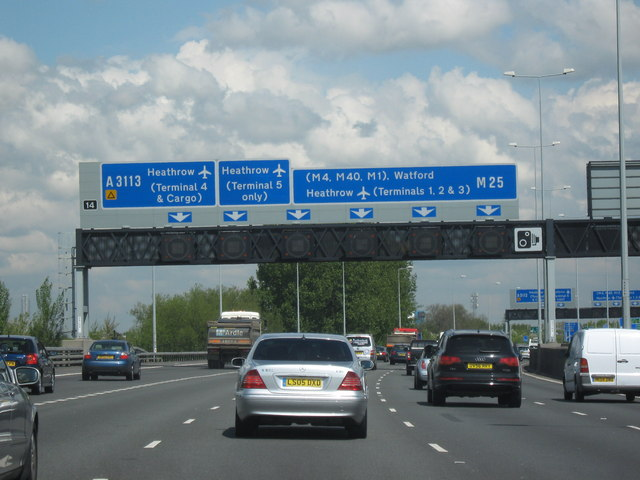
The M25 Motorway near Heathrow Airport

A map Showing Future Pattern of Principal National Routes was issued by the Ministry of War Transport in 1946 shortly before the law that allowed roads to be restricted to specified classes of vehicle (the Special Roads Act 1949) was passed. The first section of motorway, the M6 Preston Bypass, opened in 1958 followed by the first major section of motorway (the M1 between Crick and Berrygrove in Watford), which opened in 1959. From then until the 1980s, motorways opened at frequent intervals; by 1972 the first 1,600 km (1,000 mi) of motorway had been built.

While roads outside of urban areas continued to be built throughout the 1970s, opposition to urban routes became more pronounced. Most notably, plans by the Greater London Council for a series of ringways were cancelled following extensive road protests and a rise in costs. In 1986 the single-ring, M25 motorway was completed as a compromise. In 1996 the total length of motorways reached 3,200 kilometres (2,000 mi).

Motorways in Great Britain, as in numerous European countries, will nearly always have the following characteristics:

1. No traffic lights (except occasionally on slip roads before reaching the main carriageway).
2. Exit is nearly always via a numbered junction and slip road, with rare minor exceptions.
3. Pedestrians, cyclists and vehicles below a specified engine size are banned.
4. There is a central reservation separating traffic flowing in opposing directions (the only exception to this is the A38(M) in Birmingham where the central reservation is replaced by another lane in which the direction of traffic changes depending on the time of day. There was another small spur motorway near Manchester with no solid central reservation, but this was declassified as a motorway in the 2000s.)
5. No at grade junctions.

On motorways in Great Britain there were 99 fatalities in 2017 for 69 billion vehicle miles travelled, a reduction from 183 fatalities in 2007. which is equivalent to 1.43 fatalities per billion vehicle miles travelled.

===== Northern Ireland =====
Legal authority existed in the Special Roads Act (Northern Ireland) 1963 similar to that in the 1949 Act. The first motorway to open was the M1 motorway, though it did so under temporary powers until the Special Roads Act had been passed. Work on the motorways continued until the 1970s when the oil crisis and The Troubles both intervened causing the abandonment of many schemes.

=== Oceania ===
==== Australia ====

Australia's major cities, Sydney, Melbourne, Brisbane, Perth, and Adelaide feature a network of freeways within their urban areas, while Canberra, Hobart, Darwin, and the regional centres of Newcastle, Geelong and Gold Coast feature a selection of limited-access routes. Outside these areas traffic volumes do not generally demand freeway-standard access, although heavily trafficked regional corridors such as Sydney–Newcastle (M1 Pacific Motorway), Sydney–Wollongong (M1 Princes Motorway), Melbourne–Geelong (M1 Princes Freeway), Melbourne–Ballarat (M8 Western Freeway), Melbourne–Bendigo (M79 Calder Freeway), Brisbane–Gold Coast (M1 Pacific Motorway), Perth-Mandurah (SR2 Kwinana Freeway) and that form part of major long-distance routes feature high-standard freeway links.

The M31 Hume Highway/Freeway/Motorway connecting Sydney and Melbourne, the M23 Federal Highway spur route that connects Canberra with Sydney and the A1/M1 Pacific Highway/Motorway connecting Sydney and Brisbane are the only major interstate highways that are completed to a continuous dual carriageway standard. There are also plans to upgrade the A25 Barton Highway, another spur off the M31 that connects Canberra with Melbourne, to a dual carriageway highway. Although these inter-city highways are dual carriageway, they are not all controlled-access highways. Some of these inter-city highways have driveways to adjacent property and at-grade junctions with smaller roads.

Unlike many other countries, some of Australia's freeways are being opened to cyclists. As the respective state governments upgrade their state's freeways, bicycle lanes are being added and/or shoulders widened alongside the freeways. The state of Queensland is an exception, however, as cyclists are banned from all freeways, including the emergency lane.

Motorways referred to as an expressway in Australia include the Hunter Expressway, which connects the Hunter Valley with Newcastle, and the Southern Expressway, which connects Adelaide's outer southern suburbs to the southwestern suburbs.

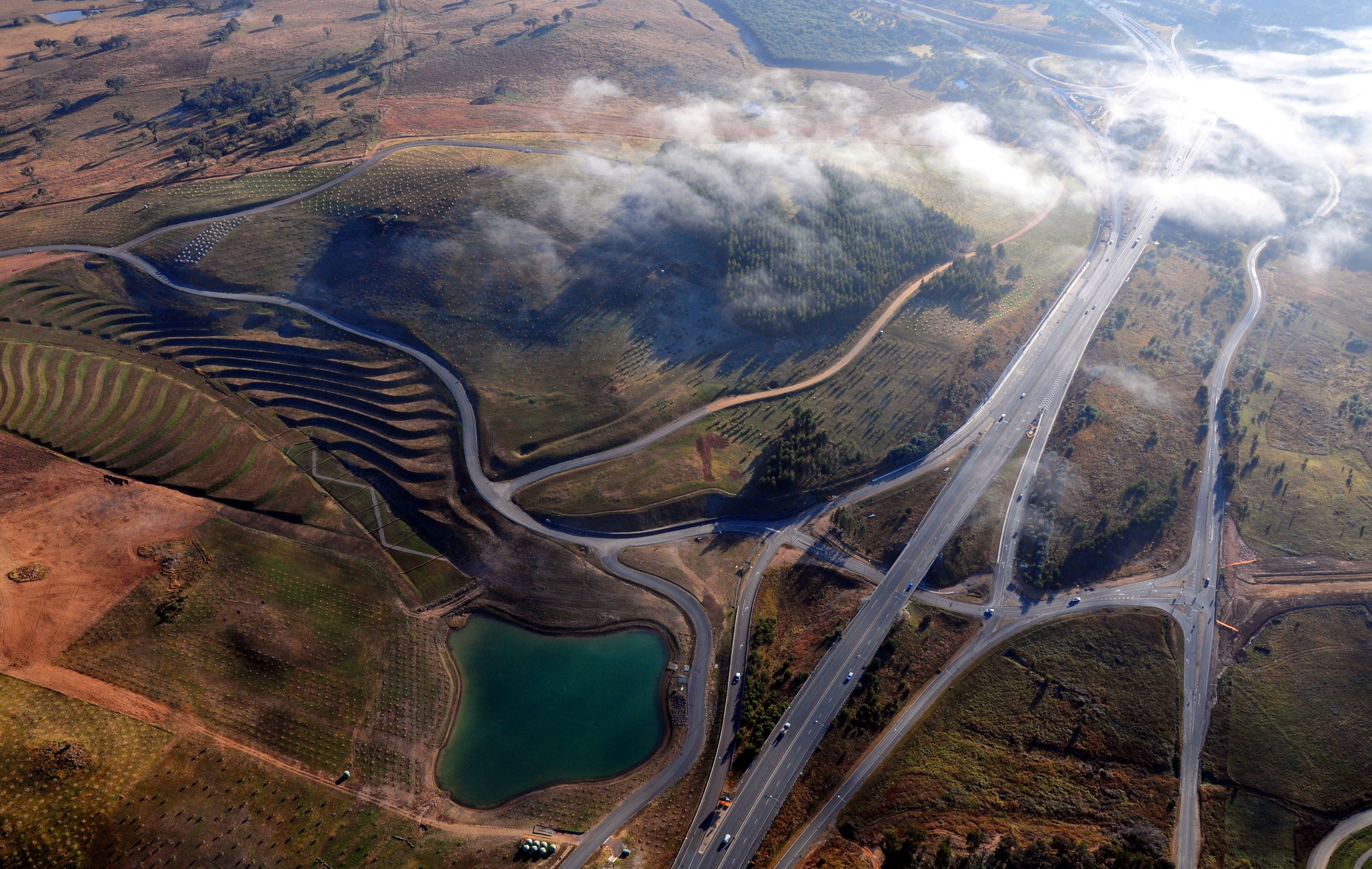
Aerial view of Tuggeranong Parkway in the Australian Capital Territory

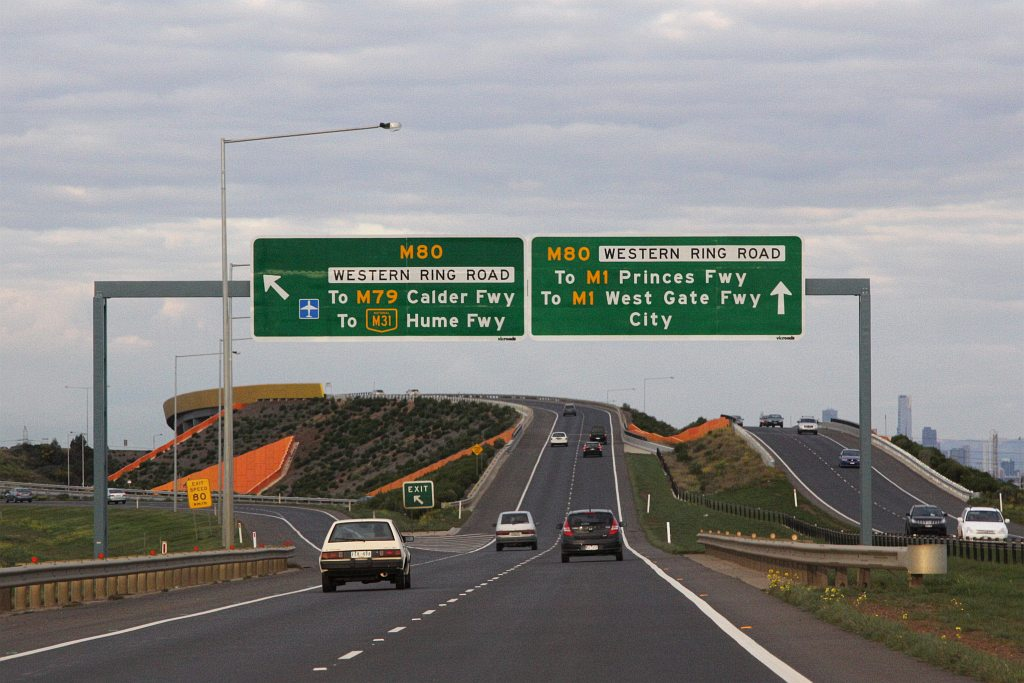
Deer Park Bypass on the Western Freeway

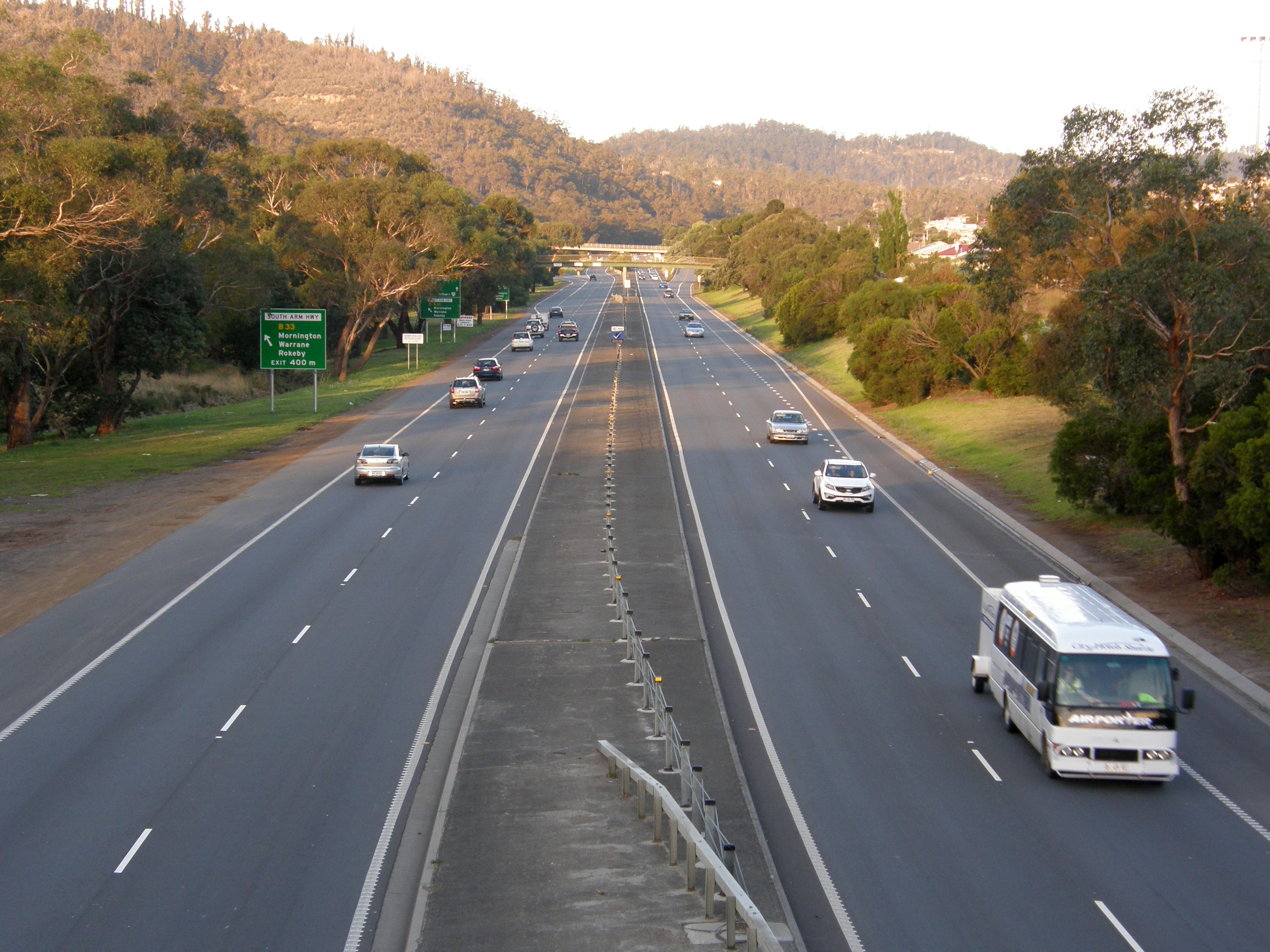
The Tasman Highway in Tasmania

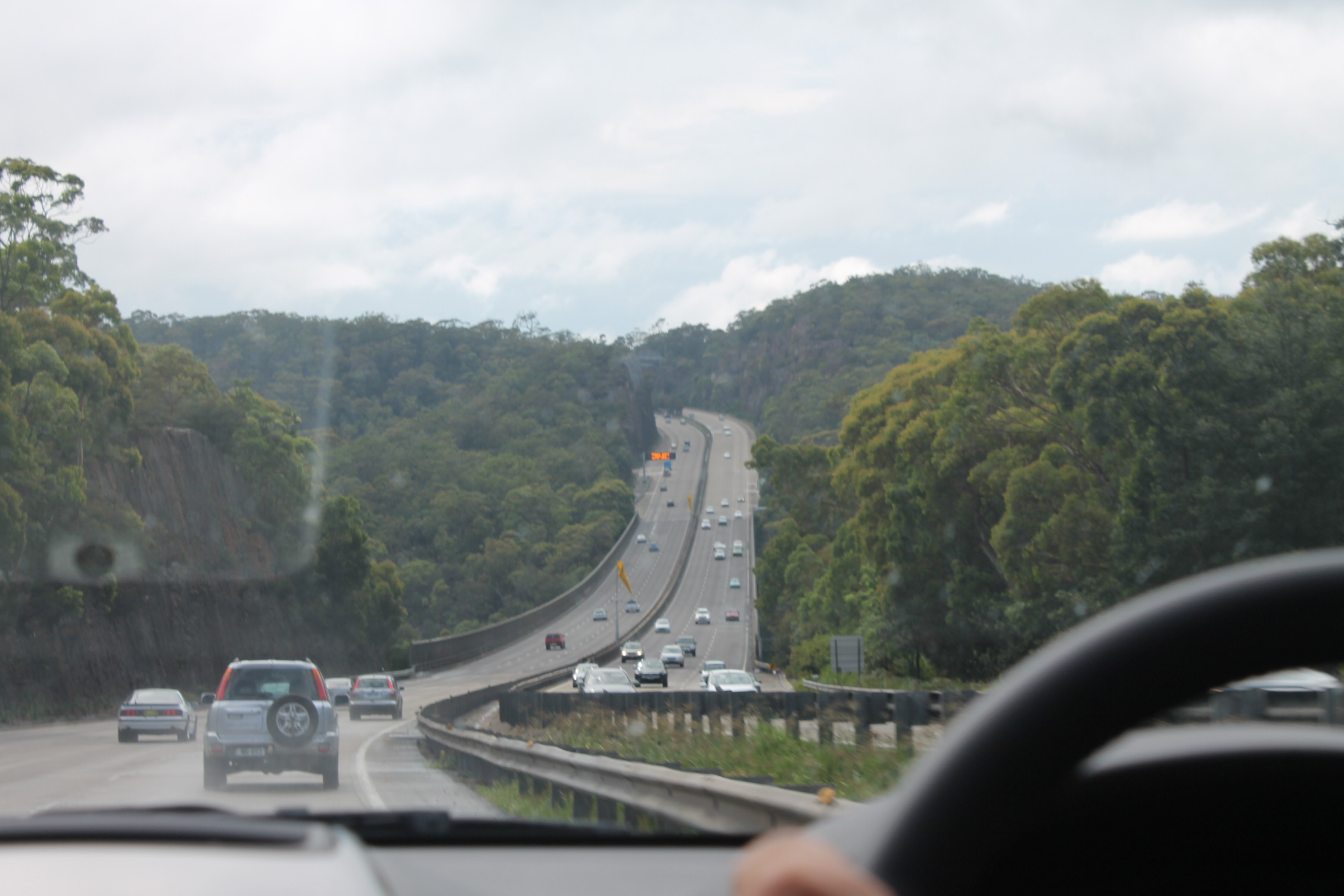
The M1 Pacific Motorway is the major road transport link between the cities of Sydney and Brisbane.

==== New Zealand ====

The term motorway in New Zealand encompasses multilane divided freeways as well as narrower two- to four-lane undivided expressways with varying degrees of grade separation; the term motorway describes the legal traffic restrictions rather than the type of road.

New Zealand's motorway network is small due to the nation's low population density and low traffic volumes making it uneconomical to build controlled-access highways outside the major urban centres.

New Zealand's first motorway opened in December 1950 near Wellington, running from Johnsonville to Tawa. This five-kilometre (3.1 mi) motorway now forms the southern part of the Johnsonville-Porirua Motorway and part of State Highway 1. Auckland's first stretch of motorway was opened in 1953 between Ellerslie and Mount Wellington (between present-day exit 435 and exit 438), and now forms part of the Southern Motorway.

Most major urban areas in New Zealand feature limited-access highways. Auckland, Wellington, Christchurch, Hamilton, Tauranga, and Dunedin contain motorways, with only Auckland having a substantial motorway network.

== See also ==
- List of controlled-access highway systems
- Autobahn
- Autoroute
- Autostrade
