= Koijärvi =

- Former municipality
- Koijärven kunta Koijärvi kommun
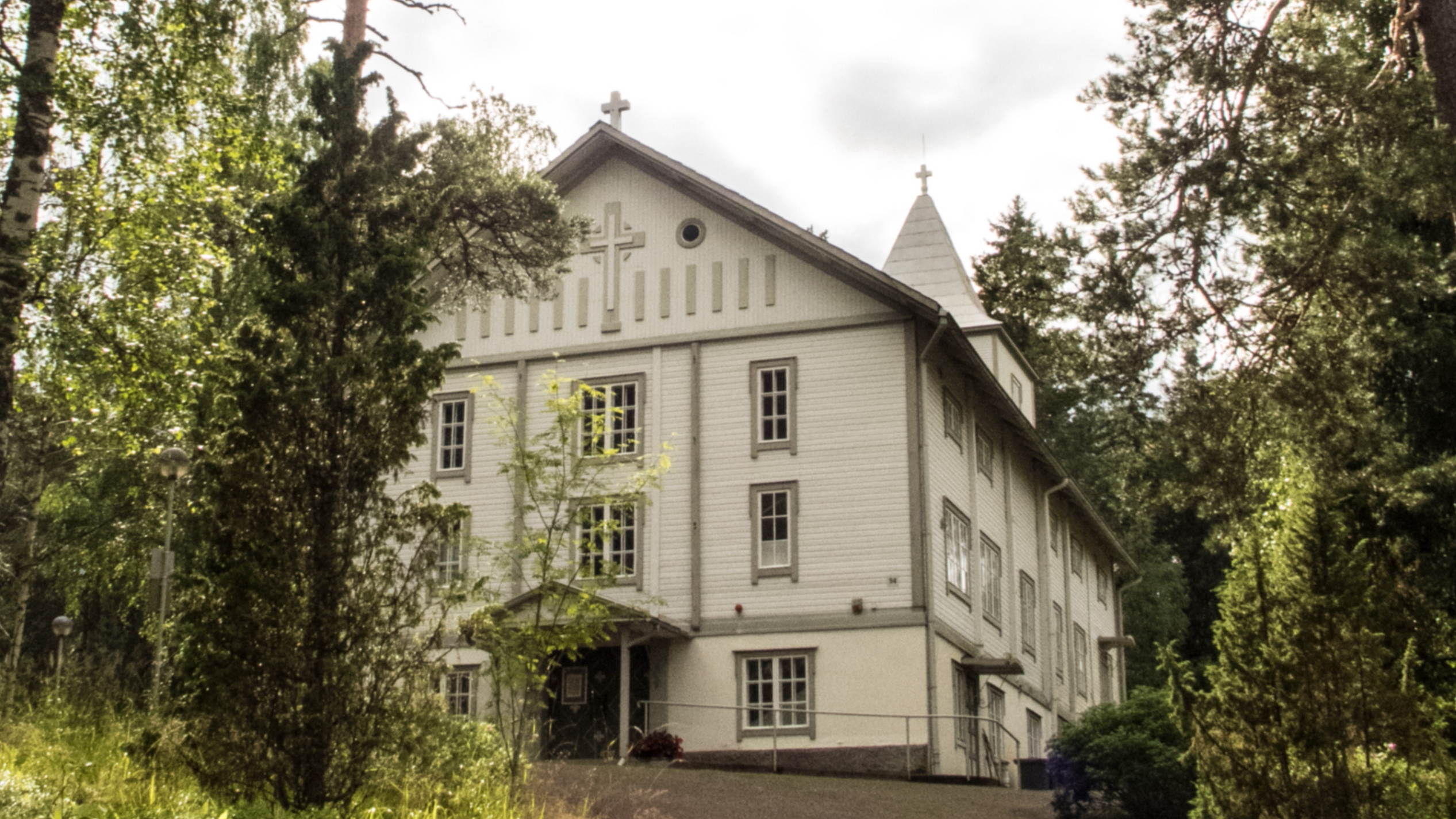
- Koijärvi Church

- Location of Koijärvi in Finland
- Coordinates: 60.9437494°N 23.6571188°E
- Country: Finland
- Province: Häme Province
- Region: Kanta-Häme
- Merged into Forssa and Urjala: 1969
- Seat: Kojo

Area
  - Land: 174.5 km^{2} (67.4 sq mi)

Population (1968-12-31)
  - Total: 2,262

Koijärvi (Finnish pronunciation: [ˈkoi̯ˌjærʋi]; lit. 'moth lake') (Note: Perhaps reduced from Koivujärvi, lit. 'birch lake'.) is a former municipality of Finland in the former Häme Province, now in Kanta-Häme. It was split between Forssa and Urjala in 1969, most of the land was given to Forssa.

In 1979, Koijärvi and the homonymous lake became known for the Koijärvi movement, which spawned the political party Vihreät.

== Geography ==
=== Villages ===
- Kojo (Koijärven kirkonkylä)
- Raitoo
- Lempää
- Kalsu
- Matku
- Peräjoki
- Saviniemi
- Suonpää
- Vuoltu

=== Lakes ===
The homonymous lake Koijärvi, from which the Koijoki river starts, is known for the birds which make their nests by it.

=== Distances ===
- Forssa: ~20 km
- Hämeenlinna: 70 km
- Tampere: 75 km
- Turku: 95 km
- Pori: 110 km
- Helsinki: 130 km

== History ==
Unofficial coat of arms

=== Before separation ===
Koijärvi is named after a nearby lake. The main village, Kojo, has existed at least since the 17th century. The first mention of it was in 1600 as Quoiuull, "at Kojo" (adessive case, in modern Finnish orthography written Kojolla. Many Tavastian dialects have an apocope of a, pronouncing it as Kojol). The area was mainly within the Tammela parish, originally called Porras.

=== Independent municipality ===
Koijärvi became a separate municipality in 1923. It was formed out of parts of Tammela and Urjala. Forssa was also separated from Tammela in the same year.

The old meeting house in Kojo was converted into a church in the 16th of December, 1923. The altarpiece is painted by Elias Muukka. The organ was made in Kangasala in 1968, while the bells were made in Yaroslavl and were originally used in a church built for Russian soldiers in Ekenäs.

Koijärvi was one of the two municipalities without a coat of arms in the 60s, the other being Uudenkaupungin maalaiskunta.

=== Merger ===

The Koijärvi municipality was dissolved in 1969. Most of it, including Kojo, was transferred to Forssa in the south, while small portions of the north were given to Urjala.

== Services ==
Most of Koijärvi's services are located in Kojo.

=== Education ===
Kojo has a school for grades 1-6 (ala-aste). A daycare is located in the same building.

=== Commercial ===
There is a small grocery store in Kojo.
