= Rutajärvi =

Rutajärvi may refer to:

- Rutajärvi (Leivonmäki), a lake in Finland
- Rutajärvi (Urjala), a lake in Finland
