= Rutajärvi (Urjala) =

Lake of Urjala, Finland

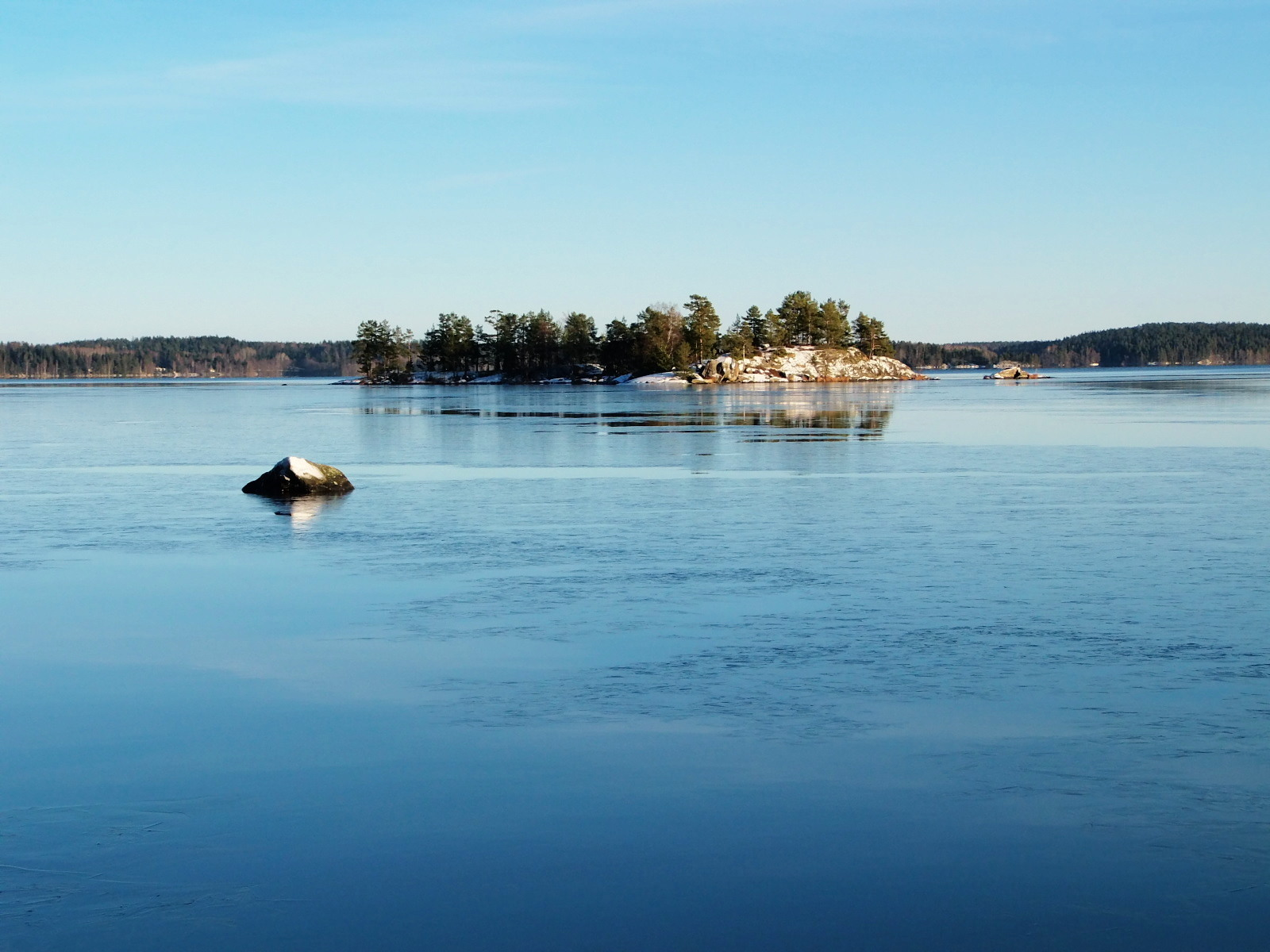

- Location within Finland
- Location: Urjala
- Coordinates: 61°04′00″N 23°27′30″E
- Basin countries: Finland
- Surface area: 11 km^{2} (4.2 sq mi)
- Average depth: 8.2 m (27 ft)
- Max. depth: 24 m (79 ft)
- Shore length^{1}: 38 km (24 mi)
- Surface elevation: 99.6 m (327 ft)
- ^{1} Shore length is not a well-defined measure.

Lake Rutajärvi is a lake in Finland situated in the municipality of Urjala, in the Pirkanmaa region. It forms part of the Kokemäenjoki basin. Lake Rutajärvi was known as 'The Airanne' until the 17th century.

The lake is a part of a chain of lakes and rivers that consists of the lakes Nuutajärvi, Rutajärvi and Kortejärvi in Urjala and Tarpianjoki River in Kalvola (now part of Hämeenlinna), Urjala, Kylmäkoski and Viiala (now part of Akaa). In Kylmäkoski Tarpianjoki runs through lake Jalanti and finally mouths into the Lake Vanajavesi in Viiala.

Lake Rutajärvi is fed by the Nuutajärvi and Kortejärvi, and collects a significant amount water from across the Urjala region.

Water flows from Lake Rutajärvi into the Urjalankylä River and into Lake Kortejärvi, where it flows from the Tarpianjoki River to Jalantijärvi and further to the Vanajavesi route. The settlement of Urjala was historically formed and has largely remained along the banks of these courses and the area between Lakes Rutajärvi and Kortejärvi.

== See also ==
- List of lakes in Finland
