= Loimijoki =

River in Finland

Coordinates: 61°13′N 22°38′E

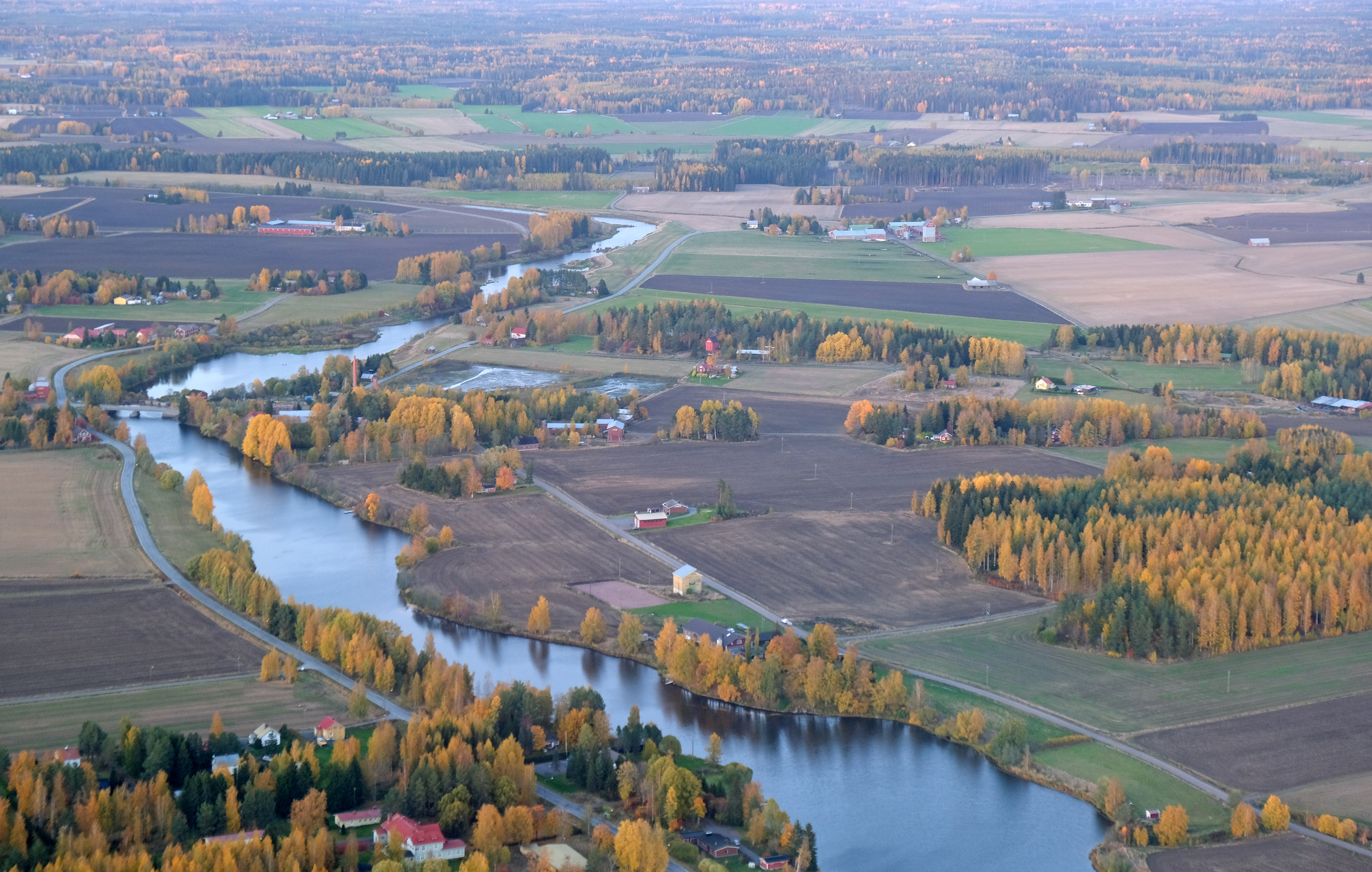
Loimijoki in Vampula

The river Loimijoki is a river in Finland and the longest tributary of the river Kokemäenjoki. The river originates at the lake Pyhäjärvi in Tammela and joins the river Kokemäenjoki in Huittinen. There is a 54-metre (177 ft) difference in elevation between the source and the mouth of the river, which is 114 kilometres (71 mi) long. The river drains a catchment area of 3,140 square kilometres (1,210 sq mi). The river has several dams at Forssa, Jokioinen and Loimaa.

The Loimijoki river runs through the most fertile lands of Finland making its water relatively muddy. The river was badly polluted by sewage of industry and population centers along the river, but since the 1980s the river has been starting to recover and currently the river sees also recreational use like fishing and water sports.
