= Punamusta =

Printing and graphic design company in Joensuu, Finland

Rebl Group Plc (until 2024 PunaMusta Media Plc and before that Pohjois-Karjalan Kirjapaino Plc) is a Finnish media group headquartered in Joensuu. The company’s share is listed on the Helsinki Stock Exchange. In January 2024, the Keskisuomalainen Group announced it would buy PunaMusta Media’s newspapers and radio station, after which the group will focus on graphic and digital services for marketing communications.

== Operations ==
The group includes the printing company PunaMusta Oy, which has printing plants in Tampere, Joensuu and Forssa. Other parts of the group are Profilight (lighting, digital displays), PunaMusta Coloro (wrapping and visual merchandising), RockOn (product information management) and Exove (digital services). In May 2025, Rebl’s subsidiaries PunaMusta and PunaMusta Coloro announced that they had acquired Hansaprint in Turku, which employs 50 people, from TS-Yhtymä and Sanoma.

The PunaMusta Media Group has offices in Joensuu, Tampere, Espoo, Helsinki, Vantaa, Jyväskylä, Lahti, Forssa, Oulu, Hämeenlinna and Tallinn. It employs about 660 people.

Until 2024, PunaMusta included Sanomalehti Karjalainen Oy, the publisher of Karjalainen, the regional newspaper of North Karelia, as well as the subsidiaries Pohjois-Karjalan Paikallislehdet Oy and Karelia Viestintä Oy, which publish local newspapers. In January 2024, the Keskisuomalainen Group announced it would acquire all of PunaMusta Media’s newspapers (in addition to Karjalainen: Outokummun Seutu, Pielisjokiseutu, Pogostan Sanomat, Ylä-Karjala, Lieksan Lehti, Parikkalan-Rautjärven Sanomat, Karjalan Heili) and the local radio station Karjalainen Syke for a total of 8.5 million euros.
