= Mika Helkearo =

Finnish ice hockey player

- Born: October 4, 1960 (age 64); Forssa, FIN
- Height: 5 ft 10 in (178 cm)
- Weight: 180 lb (82 kg; 12 st 12 lb)
- Position: Forward
- Shot: Left
- Played for: SM-liiga; HIFK; HPK; Jokerit; 1. Divisioona; FPS
- Playing career: 1977–1996

Mika Helkearo (born October 4, 1960) is a retired professional ice hockey player. He was born in Forssa, Finland.

Helkearo is best known from his tenure in Finnish First Division team FPS where he posted 817 points in 580 First Division games.

Helkearo's records are being considered virtually unbreakable and he holds the records for most Mestis/1. Divisioona games, most Mestis/1. Divisioona assists and most Mestis/1. Divisioona points as Håkan Hjerpe, the only one who is even close to Helkearo's numbers has the record for most Mestis/1. Divisioona goals (317 goals).

Cause of this, Helkearo is called "Divarin Gretzky", Gretzky of the First Division, as a nod to famous National Hockey League player Wayne Gretzky, who has big numbers on his all-time stats for NHL.

Helkearo also played in the top league of Finland, the SM-liiga where he played two seasons for HIFK, 1981–82 and 1982–83, one season for HPK, 1983–84 and a single game for Jokerit in 1993–94 season.

Helkearo retired in 1996. Helkearo was 36 years of age when he retired.

Helkearo's Jersey number 15 has been retired by FPS.

== Career statistics ==
			Regular Season					Playoffs
Season	Team	League	GP	G	A	Pts	PIM	GP	G	A	Pts	PIM
1977-78	FPS	1. Divisioona	34	14	12	26	6	--	--	--	--	--
1978-79	FPS	1. Divisioona	36	30	22	52	10	--	--	--	--	--
1979-80	FPS	1. Divisioona	34	19	19	38	8	--	--	--	--	--
1980-81	FPS	1. Divisioona	33	25	28	53	13	--	--	--	--	--
1981-82	HIFK	SM-liiga	36	12	15	27	8	8	1	2	3	0
1982-83	HIFK	SM-liiga	25	2	4	6	2	4	1	0	1	0
1983-84	HPK	SM-liiga	37	12	14	26	6	--	--	--	--	--
1984-85	FPS	1. Divisioona	33	26	45	71	10	--	--	--	--	--
1985-86	FPS	1. Divisioona	44	14	41	55	26	--	--	--	--	--
1986-87	FPS	1. Divisioona	44	20	32	52	17	--	--	--	--	--
1987-88	FPS	1. Divisioona	35	14	26	40	16	--	--	--	--	--
1988-89	FPS	1. Divisioona	44	28	70	98	4	--	--	--	--	--
1989-90	FPS	1. Divisioona	40	28	67	95	8	--	--	--	--	--
1990-91	FPS	1. Divisioona	31	13	31	44	4	--	--	--	--	--
1991-92	FPS	1. Divisioona	43	16	36	52	26	--	--	--	--	--
1992-93	FPS	1. Divisioona	36	14	25	39	6	--	--	--	--	--
1993-94	FPS	1. Divisioona	38	19	26	45	18	--	--	--	--	--
1993-94	Jokerit	SM-liiga	1	0	0	0	0	--	--	--	--	--
1994-95	FPS	1. Divisioona	12	2	6	8	4	--	--	--	--	--
1995-96	FPS	1. Divisioona	41	11	36	47	2	5	1	5	6	0
SM-liiga Totals			99	26	33	59	16	12	2	2	4	0
1. Divisioona Totals			580	295	522	817	178	5	1	5	6	0
