= Forssa =

- Town
- Forssan kaupunki Forssa stad
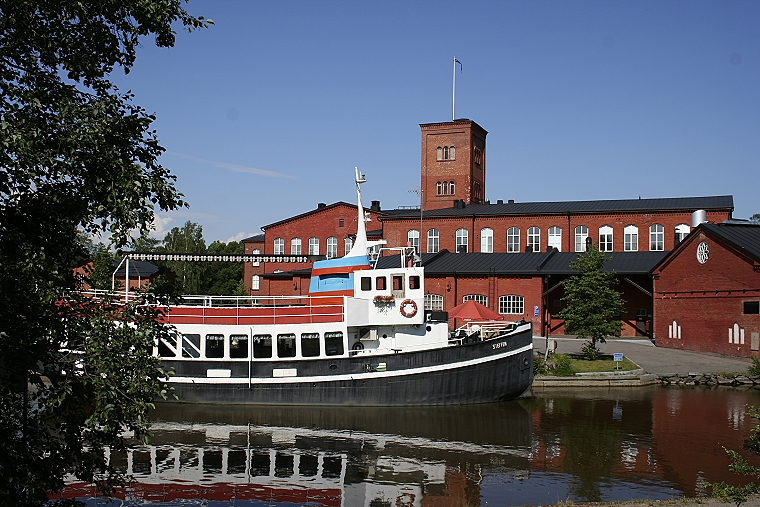
- By the River Loimijoki

- Coat of arms

- Location of Forssa in Finland
- Interactive map of Forssa
- Coordinates: 60°49′N 023°37.5′E
- Country: Finland
- Region: Kanta-Häme
- Sub-region: Forssa
- Charter: 1923
- Town privileges: 1964

Government
  - Town manager: Jari Kesäniemi

Area (2018-01-01)
  - Total: 253.38 km^{2} (97.83 sq mi)
  - Land: 248.84 km^{2} (96.08 sq mi)
  - Water: 4.61 km^{2} (1.78 sq mi)
  - Rank: 246th largest in Finland

Population (2025-12-31)
  - Total: 16,307
  - Rank: 67th largest in Finland
  - Density: 65.53/km^{2} (169.7/sq mi)

Population by native language
  - Finnish: 89.5% (official)
  - Swedish: 0.3%
  - Others: 10.2%

Population by age
  - 0 to 14: 12%
  - 15 to 64: 56.5%
  - 65 or older: 31.5%
- Time zone: UTC+02:00 (EET)
  - Summer (DST): UTC+03:00 (EEST)
- Website: www.forssa.fi/in-english/

Forssa is a town and municipality of Finland. It is located almost in the centre of a triangle defined by the three largest major cities in Finland (Helsinki, Turku and Tampere), in the Kanta-Häme region, and which is crossed by Highway 2 between Pori and Helsinki and Highway 10 between Turku and Hämeenlinna. The town has a population of 16,307 (31 December 2025) and covers an area of 253.38 square kilometres (97.83 sq mi) of which 4.61 km^{2} (1.78 sq mi) is water. The population density is 65.53 inhabitants per square kilometre (169.7/sq mi). Only a little part of the surface area of Forssa is water, but the river Loimijoki forms an important element in the cityscape, with the city being located at its starting point. Other notable water areas in Forssa include the lake Kaukjärvi and the lake Koijärvi, known as the birthplace of the Green League.

The municipality is unilingually Finnish. However, the name Forssa comes from the Swedish word "fors", meaning rapids.

Forssa is the central locality of the Forssa sub-region. The city is bordered with Jokioinen to the west, Tammela to the east and south and Humppila and Urjala to the north. As well as Forssa, the Forssa sub-region includes Jokioinen, Tammela, Humppila and Ypäjä. Forssa is the smallest of the three cities in Kanta-Häme, with a population of about 16,500, and in terms of population Forssa is the 67th largest municipality in Finland. The population in Forssa has concentrated on the Forssa central conurbation in the southern part of the municipality, which also spreads over to the municipalities of Jokioinen and Tammela. The area of the former municipality of Koijärvi in the northern part of the city is a sparsely populated rural area.

Forssa grew and developed in the 19th century when the textile industry grew. In the 20th century the city barely grew at all between the two World wars. A new growth phase began in the 1960s, sped by construction industry. The population of Forssa was as its highest in the middle 1980s when the city had a bit over 20 thousand inhabitants for two years. The growth of the city since stopped as the industry started diminishing. By 1994 the population had decreased by a few hundred people, but after that the decrease in population grew. By late 2005 Forssa had lost over two thousand people compared to its highest point. In 2008 the population of Forssa increased for the first time since 1993. After 2010 population has again decreased, with the population in 2016 being about 17,300. Today the food industry is a notable employer.

The location of Forssa, in the middle of the triangle formed by the cities of Helsinki, Turku and Tampere, is sometimes seen as ideal, as commute trips to the largest cities in the country are fast. The distance to Helsinki is 110 kilometres, the distance to Tampere is 87 kilometres and the distance to Turku is 88 kilometres.

== History ==
The development of Forssa into an industrial conurbation started when industrialist Axel Wilhelm Wahren founded a spinning mill on the shore of the river Loimijoki in 1847. Today the Forssa industrial community has been classified as a notable constructed cultural environment in Finland.

In 1903 a party meeting of the Finnish Workers' Party, known as the Forssa meeting, was held in Forssa, where the party was renamed as the Social Democratic Party of Finland and a new party program was accepted into use.

Forssa only became an independent municipality in 1923 when it was separated from the municipality of Tammela into its own market town. Forssa received city privileges in 1964. The depression in the early 1990s had a large impact on Forssa, resulting in economic problems and an unemployment rate that still remains high today.

=== Coat of arms ===
The former coat of arms of Forssa, in use from 1947 to 1962

The current coat of arms of Forssa was designed by Olof Eriksson in 1962. Its heraldic description reads: A silver waterwheel on a blue shield. The coat of arms depicts water power and the river Loimijoki running through the city. The coat of arms was taken into use on 29 August 1962.

The former coat of arms of Forssa was designed by Arne Wilhelm Rancken in 1947. The coat of arms had a wavy division with a silver waterwheel on a blue background at the bottom part, and three blue wavy lines and a red letter F on a silver background at the top part. This coat of arms was later discontinued as unheraldic.

== Population ==
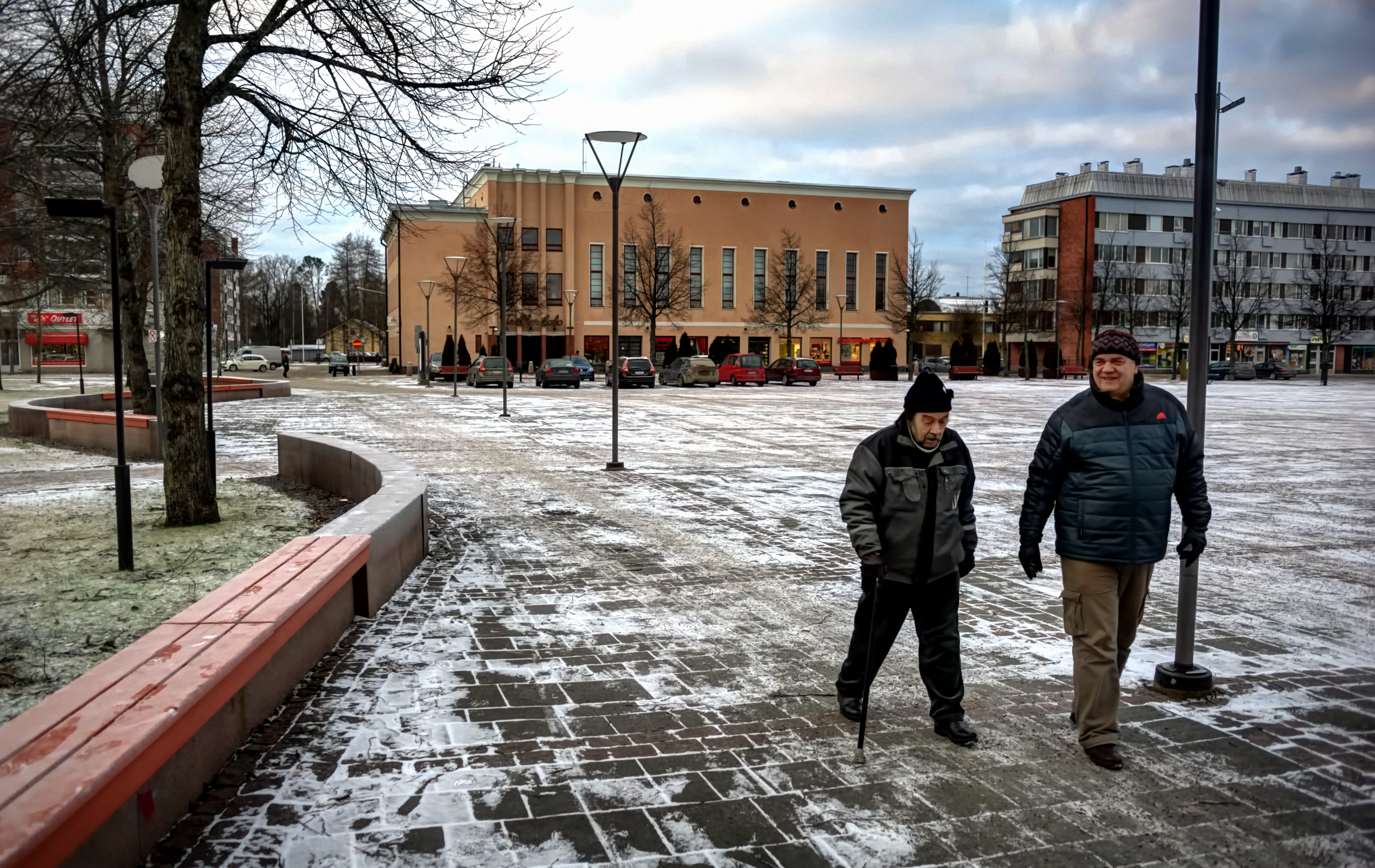
The Forssa market square on 30 December 2015

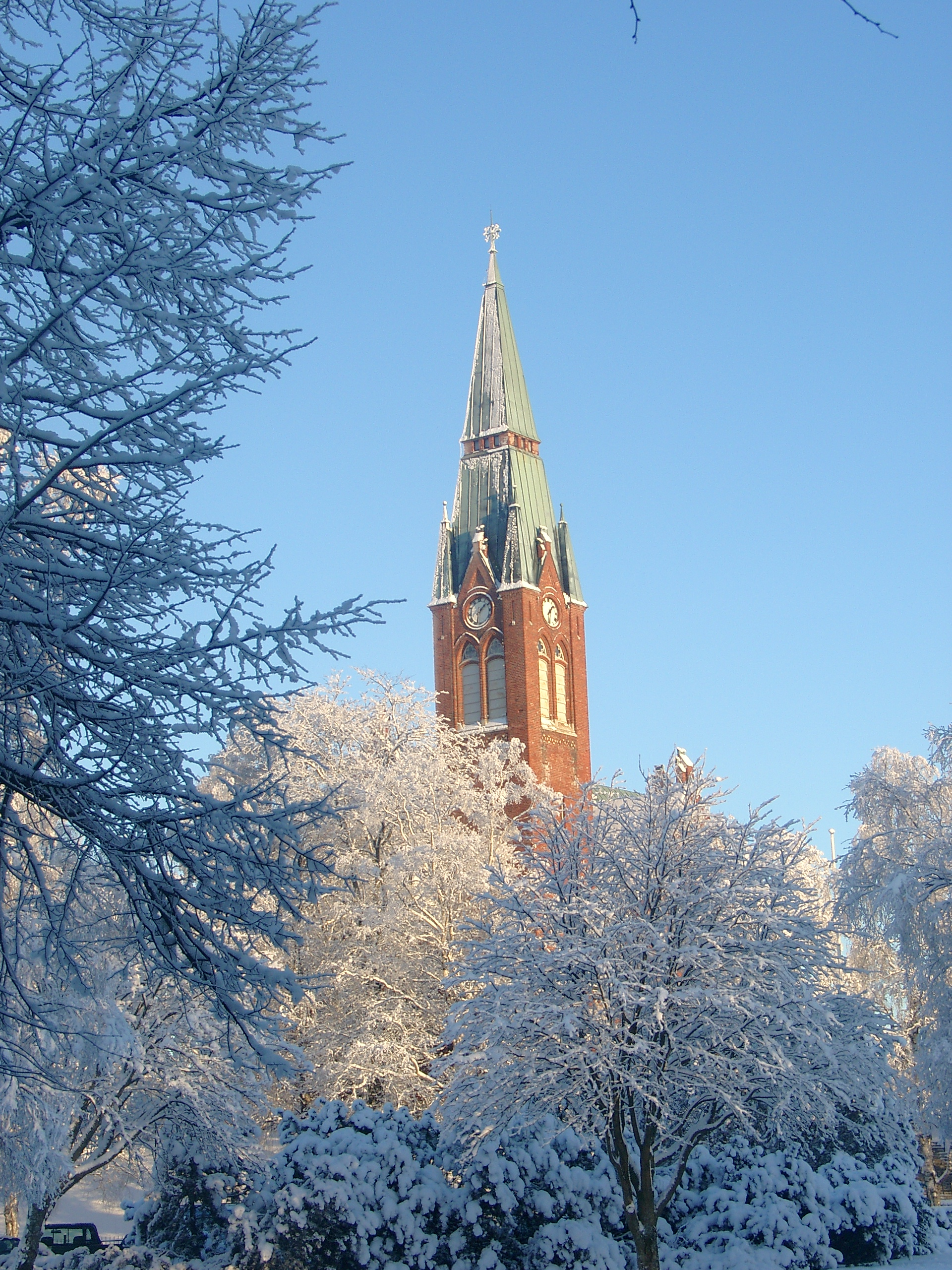
The Forssa church

The population development in Forssa from 1847 to 1990 has been researched in the 1995 annual of the Homestead and museum association of Southwestern Tavastia and in the book Forssan historia by Risto O. Peltovuori, published in 1993. After Forssa became an independent municipality in 1923, its population in 1925 was 7,681. The development of population was modest until 1945; at that time the population was 8,045. After this, the increase in population sped up: Forssa reached 9,000 inhabitants in 1952, 10,000 inhabitants in 1957, 11,000 inhabitants in 1962, 12,000 inhabitants in 1966 and 13,000 inhabitants in 1968 with a population of 13,157. The annexation of Koijärvi to Forssa in 1969 raised the population to over 15,000. In 1971 the Lempää area of about 9 square kilometres was annexed to Forssa from Tammela, raising the population by about a hundred.

Forssa grew rapidly in the 1970s, but in the middle 1980s this growth stopped. The city population was at its highest at 20,074 in late 1985. After the middle 1990s the population of the city and of the entire region started to decrease rapidly. From 2005 to 2010 the population settled at about 17,900 people, but after that it started to decrease again with the population at late 2016 being about 17,300.

90 percent of the population of Forssa live in the urban central conurbation of Forssa, where population is dense. In the rural areas in central and northern Forssa both the population and the population density are low. The Forssa central conurbation also reaches over to Jokioinen and Tammela. Of the entire population of the Forssa region, the population of Forssa proper is about one half.

Population concentration spots of the Forssa industrial community are the Kalliomäki wooden house area to the north of the river Loimijoki and the wooden house areas of Vanha Kuhala, Uusikylä and Yliskylä to the south of the river. Throughout the decades, new city districts have been built around this historical centre. The Viksberg apartment building suburb was mostly built in the 1970s and the suburb of Tölö in the 1970s and 1980s, but their population has been decreasing. Recently the population has increased in the city outskirts through construction of detached houses and also in the city centre through construction of apartment buildings.

In late 2011, about 13.5 percent of the population of Forssa belonged to the age bracket of 0 to 14 years, 63.2 percent to the bracket of 15 to 64 years and 23.3 percent to the bracket of over 64 years. In the long run, both the absolute number and the proportion of children have significantly decreased. The elderly are the only age group to increase in either absolute number or proportion. In 1997 the number of children fell below the number of the elderly.

Most of the children live in new small house areas on the edge of the central conurbation. Most of the elderly live in Korkeavaha and the city centre, where the proportion of people of 64 years or older is 40 percent.

From 1980 to 2010 the language distribution in Forssa has remained fairly stable. The absolute number of Finnish language speakers has decreased by about 1,900 people, but the proportion has only decreased by a little from 99.6 percent to 97.1 percent. The number of Swedish language speakers has decreased by about a third. The most significant increase has been in the group of people speaking other languages than Finnish or Swedish, which has increased manifold.

=== Congregations ===
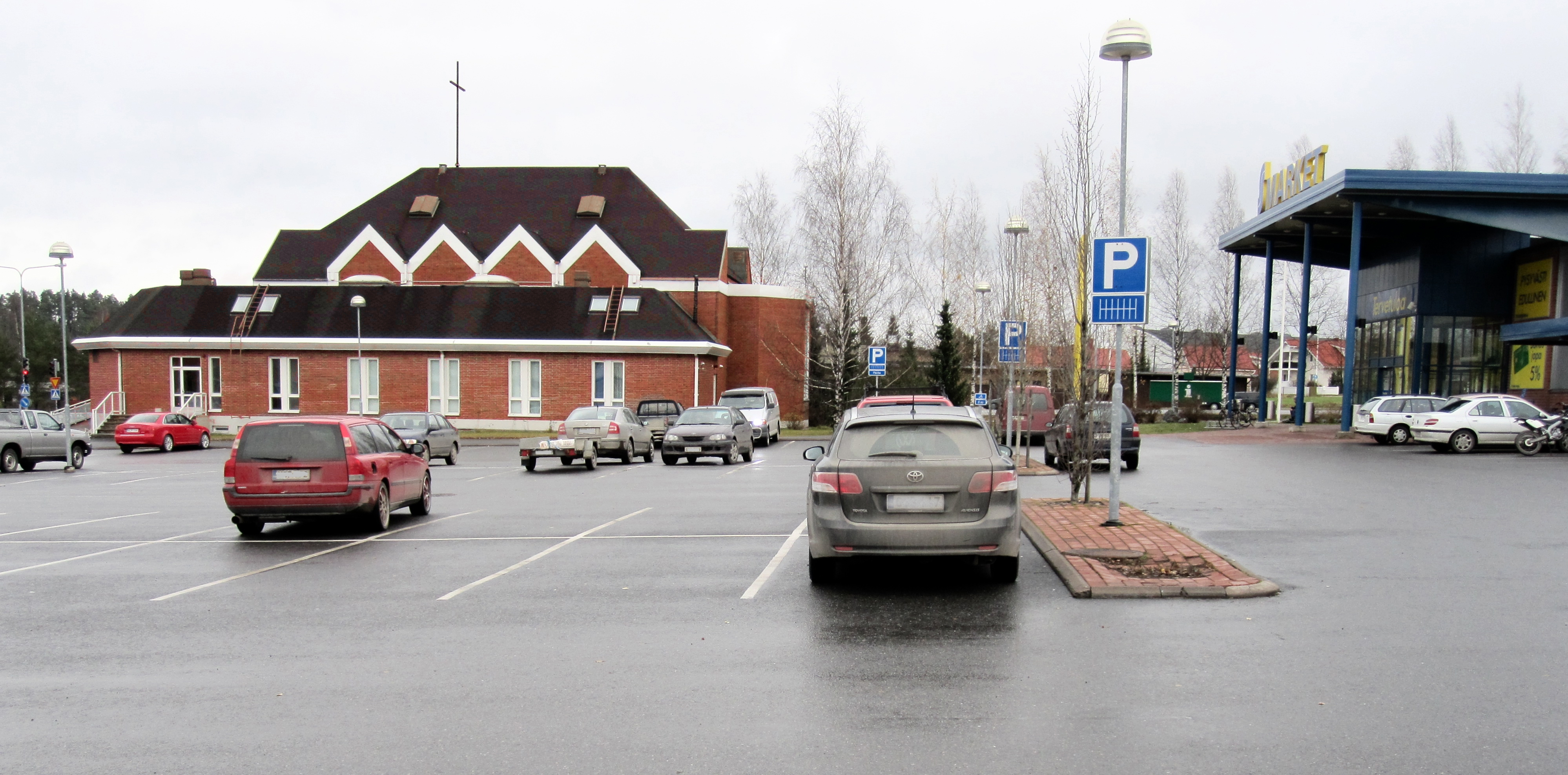
The Pentecostal church of Forssa next to the S-Market grocery store in 2010

In 2023, the Evangelical Lutheran Church was the largest religious group with 70.9% of the population of Forssa. Other religious groups accounted for 2.3% of the population. 26.8% of the population had no religious affiliation.

According to the 2018 division Forssa includes its own congregation of the Evangelical Lutheran Church. The former congregation of Koijärvi was annexed to the congregation of Forssa in 2007. The city has an activity centre of the Hämeenlinna Orthodox congregation, a Jehovah's Witnesses Kingdom Hall, a Pentecostal Salem church and activity of the Evangelical Free Church of Finland. The Evangelical Free Church has its premises in the Kerhola building commissioned by the Forssa company. Forssa also has a cemetery of the Union of Freethinkers of Finland.

The Pentecostal Church of Finland has its own congregation in Forssa and the Evangelical Free Church of Finland also has its own free congregation in Forssa.

== Geography ==
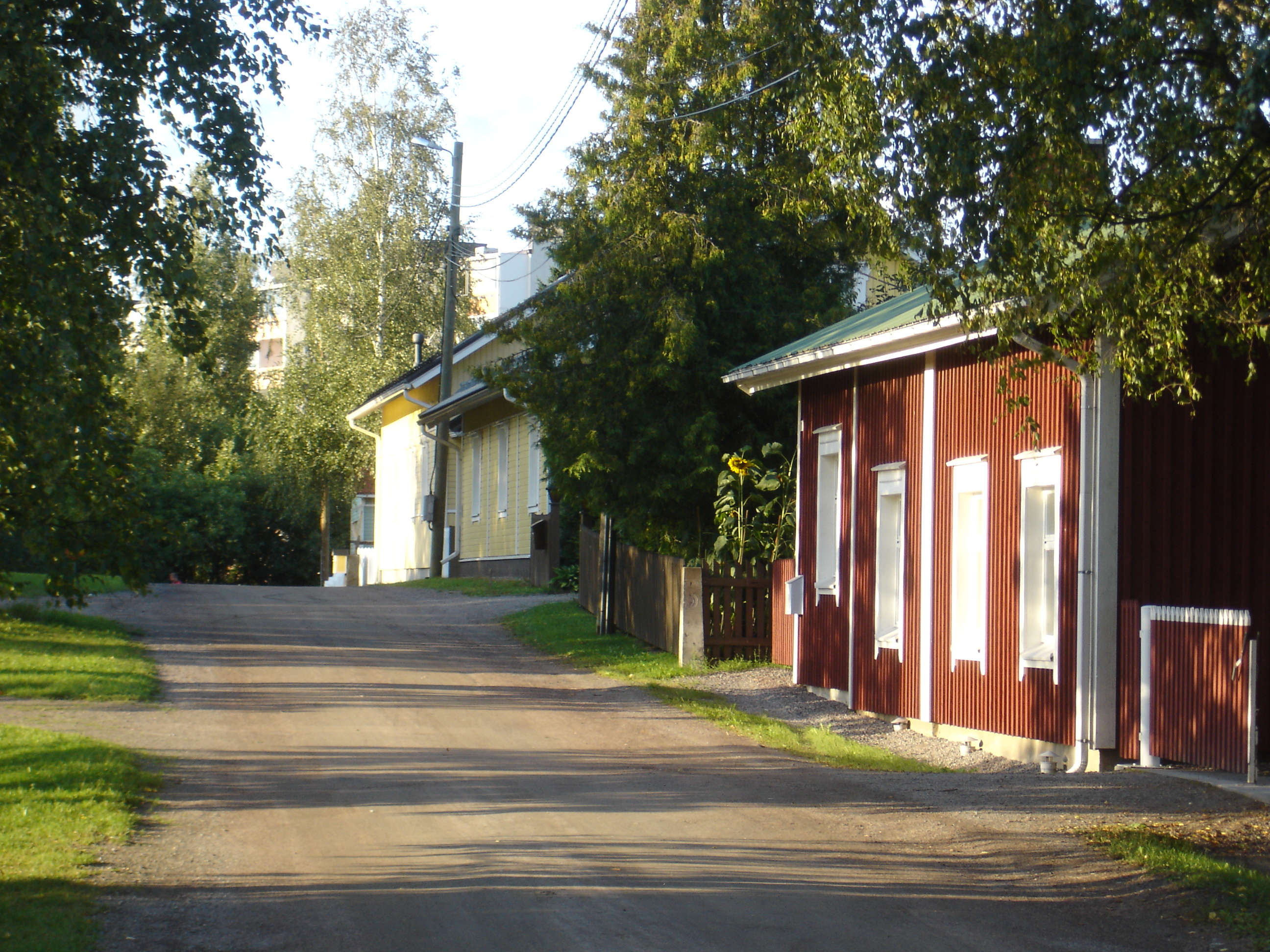
Wooden buildings in Kalliomäki

=== Development of population ===
==== From 1847 to 1946 ====
The first planned constructed areas in Forssa were Wahreninkatu and the buildings at Viksberg. Kalliomäki with its lines was born starting from the 1870s after Wahren had ordered a zoning plan in the area. In addition to Kalliomäki, the oldest inhabited areas in Forssa include Vanha Kuhala to the south of the river Loimijoki, Uusikylä between Rautatienkatu and Räynynoja and Yliskylä, also known as Ameriikka, slightly to the west of Uusikylä.

According to Helga Keränen's 1930 research, the market town of Forssa was divided into ten physiognomical areas, including the Kalliomäki area, the greater population area of Hämeentie, the Puisto area, the Forssa industrial area, the Viksberg industrial area, the Forssa business centre, the smaller population area of Keski-Forssa, "Amerikka" and the new population area of Yliskylä. This division only concerned the tightly built areas in Forssa, not the rural areas around them.

Until 1946, the area of tightly-built wooden houses was fairly small compared to the conurbated area of today. A large part of the currently populated areas were still fields. As well as the aforementioned areas, there was inhabitation in Kekkala, a little in Pispanmäki and some buildings on the lands of the Viksberg manor. The construction of Rantalanmäki had already started at this point.

==== From the 1950s to the 1980s ====
New apartment buildings were built at the Kartanonkatu and Forssa market square area, as well as Viksberg, in the 1960s. Many old wooden buildings were dismantled to make way for new construction. Afterwards, the dismantling of many old buildings has been met with criticism. Perhaps the most famous dismantled building was the "Gingerbread House" located at the intersection between Säästöpankinkatu and Hämeentie. Construction of new apartment buildings continued in the 1970s, when construction of Tölö started, new red brick apartment buildings were built along Pekolanraitti and construction of Viksberg continued.

The expanding industry in the city spread to the lands of the old Viksberg manor. Parma constructed its element factory and Ahlström built its steel wool factory at Pispanmäki to the west of National Road 2.

Small house areas slowly spread to the edges of the city. After Talsoila, new detached houses were built in the north at Lamminranta, Ojalanmäki, Kaikula and Vieremä. Construction of Paavola started in the 1980s and today the area is almost completely built up. Paavola hosted the Asuntomessut apartment fair in 1982.

==== From the 1990s to today ====
Expansion of Forssa has been fairly slow, as the decrease of population has also led to a decrease in demand for new apartments. However, some new detached houses have been constructed. Most of the new houses are located in Kuusto in the eastern part of the city, and some are located in Pikkumuolaa, Paavola and the northwestern part of Vieremä. During the last couple of years, some new apartment buildings have been built in Makasiiniranta.

=== Bodies of water ===
Of the total surface area of Forssa only 4.61 square kilometres are bodies of water, which is 1.8 percent of the total surface area. In the central conurbation area, the only bodies of water are part of lake Kaukjärvi in the east, the river Loimijoki flowing through the city, the nearly filled-up lake Loimalammi flowing to the river, lake Linikkalanlammi in Linikkala and lake Mäkilammi in Vieremä. The largest lake in the region is lake Pyhäjärvi in neighbouring Tammela.

The river Jänhijoki, a side river of Loimijoki, flows through the central parts of the area of dispersed settlement in Forssa. Bodies of water at the river's starting point include the lakes Kiimalammi and Luomalammi, located in the north near the border of Tammela, belonging to the chain of small forest lakes in Mustiala in Tammela.

The bird lake of Koijärvi is located in the northern part of the area of dispersed settlement. The river Koijoki (also known as Kojonjoki or Koenjoki), the largest side river of Loimijoki, starts at the lake, flowing past Matku to the west along the border to Jokioinen and Humppila. Another starting lake of this river is Valijärvi near the border to Tammela. Bodies of water near Pyhäjärvi in Tammela include lake Lunkinjärvi near the border to Tammela. Near the border to Urjala, bodies of water partly located in Forssa at the starting point of the river Tarpianjoki flowing through Urjala included the lakes of Kokonjärvi, Särkijärvi and Matkunjärvi.

=== Parks ===
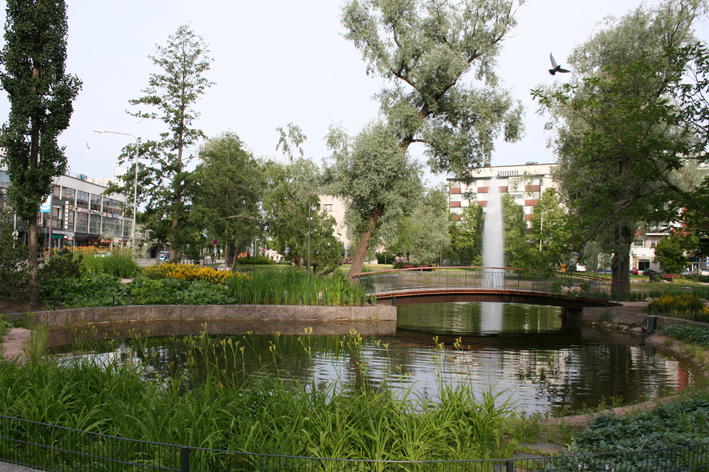
The Ankkalammi park on the southern edge of the Forssa market square

There are 110 parks in Forssa, with a combined area of 303 hectares. Some of the most notable parks include:

- Ankkalammi park: Located to the south of the market square. The park was renewed during the renovation of the market square.
- Yhtiönpuisto park: A park located near the old spinning mill, sometimes also referred to as the Wahren park.
- Central park: The next natural park along the river Loimijoki after the Yhtiönpuisto park, also has a football field.
- Talsoila park: A partly built, partly natural park in Talsoila, made as a public park open to everyone in contrast to the previously closed Yhtiönpuisto park.
- Rantapuisto park: A park located opposite the Central park on the river shore in Rantalanmäki.
- Harjupuisto park: A forest park with pine trees, on the border between Kaikula and Vieremä.
- Mäkilammi park: A forest park with pine trees, bordering Mäkilammi in Vieremä.
- Lamminranta park: A park around Lamminranta.
- Paavola park: A partly built, partly forest park in the district of Paavola.
- Siurila park: A park in the centre of the Viksberg residential area, with two ponds, an artificial brook and a fountain.
- Salmistonmäki and Loimalammi: A natural area located at the eastern park of Haudankorva right next to the border to Tammela.

Many of the parks are natural greenspaces and not actively tended "parade parks".

==== National urban park ====
The city of Forssa has been built on area alternating between forest and field landscapes. Three areas in the city have received the position of a national urban park.

- The Haudankorva and Kuusto field areas as agrarian landscape areas
- The old industrial buildings and some old districts (such as Kalliomäki, Kuhala and Rantalanmäki) as industrial heritage areas
- Hunnari in Vieremä, the area next to the cemetery in Kaikula and the area around the pond in Lamminranta as esker areas.

=== Climate ===
Forssa has a humid continental climate (Dfb)

Climate data for Jokioinen (adjacent to Forssa), 1991-2020 normals, extremes 1959 -present
| Month | Jan | Feb | Mar | Apr | May | Jun | Jul | Aug | Sep | Oct | Nov | Dec | Year |
|---|---|---|---|---|---|---|---|---|---|---|---|---|---|
| Record high °C (°F) | 8.2 (46.8) | 9.4 (48.9) | 16.3 (61.3) | 23.5 (74.3) | 29.2 (84.6) | 32.1 (89.8) | 32.3 (90.1) | 31.8 (89.2) | 27.6 (81.7) | 18.4 (65.1) | 13.3 (55.9) | 10.8 (51.4) | 32.3 (90.1) |
| Mean daily maximum °C (°F) | −2.1 (28.2) | −2.0 (28.4) | 2.0 (35.6) | 9.0 (48.2) | 15.8 (60.4) | 19.7 (67.5) | 22.1 (71.8) | 20.8 (69.4) | 15.3 (59.5) | 8.0 (46.4) | 2.7 (36.9) | 0.0 (32.0) | 9.3 (48.7) |
| Daily mean °C (°F) | −4.8 (23.4) | −5.4 (22.3) | −1.9 (28.6) | 3.9 (39.0) | 10.0 (50.0) | 14.3 (57.7) | 17.0 (62.6) | 15.5 (59.9) | 10.6 (51.1) | 4.9 (40.8) | 0.7 (33.3) | −2.6 (27.3) | 5.2 (41.3) |
| Mean daily minimum °C (°F) | −7.8 (18.0) | −8.3 (17.1) | −5.8 (21.6) | −0.8 (30.6) | 3.9 (39.0) | 8.7 (47.7) | 11.4 (52.5) | 10.5 (50.9) | 6.4 (43.5) | 2.0 (35.6) | −1.6 (29.1) | −4.8 (23.4) | 1.1 (34.1) |
| Record low °C (°F) | −36.7 (−34.1) | −39.3 (−38.7) | −29.0 (−20.2) | −20.9 (−5.6) | −7.0 (19.4) | −3.1 (26.4) | 0.8 (33.4) | −1.5 (29.3) | −8.8 (16.2) | −16.4 (2.5) | −24.5 (−12.1) | −33.4 (−28.1) | −39.3 (−38.7) |
| Average precipitation mm (inches) | 47 (1.9) | 35 (1.4) | 31 (1.2) | 32 (1.3) | 38 (1.5) | 68 (2.7) | 74 (2.9) | 72 (2.8) | 54 (2.1) | 63 (2.5) | 56 (2.2) | 51 (2.0) | 621 (24.5) |
| Average precipitation days (≥ 1.0 mm) | 11 | 9 | 8 | 8 | 7 | 10 | 10 | 10 | 9 | 11 | 11 | 12 | 116 |
| Average relative humidity (%) | 91 | 89 | 81 | 72 | 66 | 70 | 74 | 78 | 84 | 89 | 93 | 93 | 82 |
| Mean monthly sunshine hours | 36 | 68 | 144 | 190 | 259 | 259 | 264 | 214 | 140 | 77 | 28 | 22 | 1,701 |
Source 1: FMI climatological normals 1991-2020
Source 2: Record highs and lows

=== Transport ===
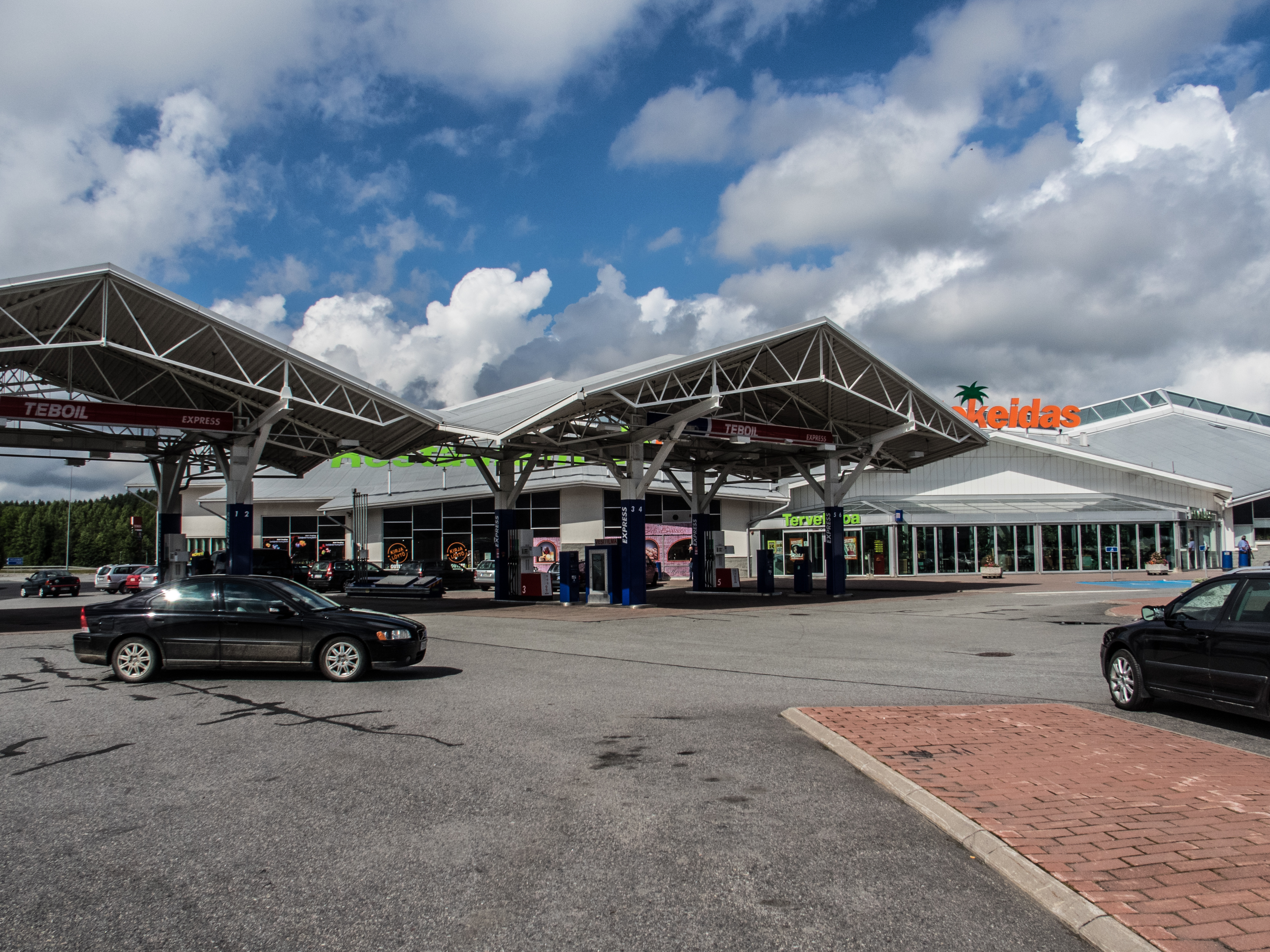
The Autokeidas truck stop on the intersection of highways 2 and 10

==== Transport connections ====
Roads passing through the centre of Forssa include:

- Finnish national road 2 from Helsinki via Forssa to Pori
- Finnish national road 10 from Turku via Forssa to Hämeenlinna
- Finnish regional road 282 from Somero to Forssa
- Finnish regional road 284 from Urjala via the Koijärvi church to Forssa
- Finnish connecting road 2804 from the centre of Jokioinen to Forssa (named Jokioistentie in Forssa)
- Finnish connecting road 2821 from the centre of Tammela to Forssa (named Tammelantie in Forssa, also known as Tammelansuora)

The poor condition of national road 2 has been seen as a factor slowing down the development of Forssa. The highways starting from Helsinki have been changed to controlled-access highways, but the national road 2, with a smaller amount of traffic, is still a conventional two-laned highway. The national road 2 was improved in the vicinity of Forssa from 2006 to 2009 by building the new Paavola bridge and a bypass lane in Jokioinen, which also serves as a reserve landing strip for the Finnish Air Force.

The Turku–Toijala railway passes through Matku, but the trains no longer stop there, and the old station building in Matku has been dismantled. The railway structures in the centre of Forssa were dismantled in the 1970s and the city thus no longer has railway connections of its own. The nearest passenger traffic station is in Humppila. There have been suggestions for building a railway to the city. These suggestions have included a railway from Helsinki via Forssa and Humppila to Pori. This project could be started in the middle 2020s at the earliest. Another suggestion is the construction of a railway from Riihimäki via Forssa to Loimaa.

The Forssa Airfield is located in the district of Haudankorva and is used for hobby aviation. The nearest airports for commercial passenger aviation are located in Helsinki, Tampere and Turku.

==== Internal transport ====
The transport in the centre of Forssa has been seen as problematic. For example the Kauppakatu street was forbidden for heavy-duty car transport in early 2008. There have also been long-time plans for a so-called "Eastern beltway", which would allow traffic to bypass the city centre of Forssa from national road 2 to national road 10 and possibly onwards to Tampereentie. As a part of this plan, the street Loimalammintie was built as new southern entryway to the city and the connection from Helsingintie, the previous entryway, to national road 2 was removed.

There have been plans for an extension of the Yhtiönkatu street from the current end of Yhtiönkatu to the start of Tampereentie, along line I past the church, for decades. The planned street was marked into the zoning plan in 1969, and there is a new street connection between Yhtiönkatu and Tampereentie in the new regional plan. The zoning plan is seen as outdated, and there have been frequent discussions about renewing it. There has been support both for various solutions about constructing a road connection and for leaving the street unbuilt. The project has been very controversial, and sometimes there has been much discussion about it in the readers' column in the Forssan Lehti newspaper. The administrative law court of Hämeenlinna rejected the plan for the area including the street and Forssa complained about this decision, but the Supreme Administrative Court of Finland rejected this complaint.

There have also been plans for a renovation of the Kartanonkatu street for a long time. Renovation of the street started in July 2012 and was completed in late 2012. Failures in speed bump construction had to be repaired for several times.

== Districts ==
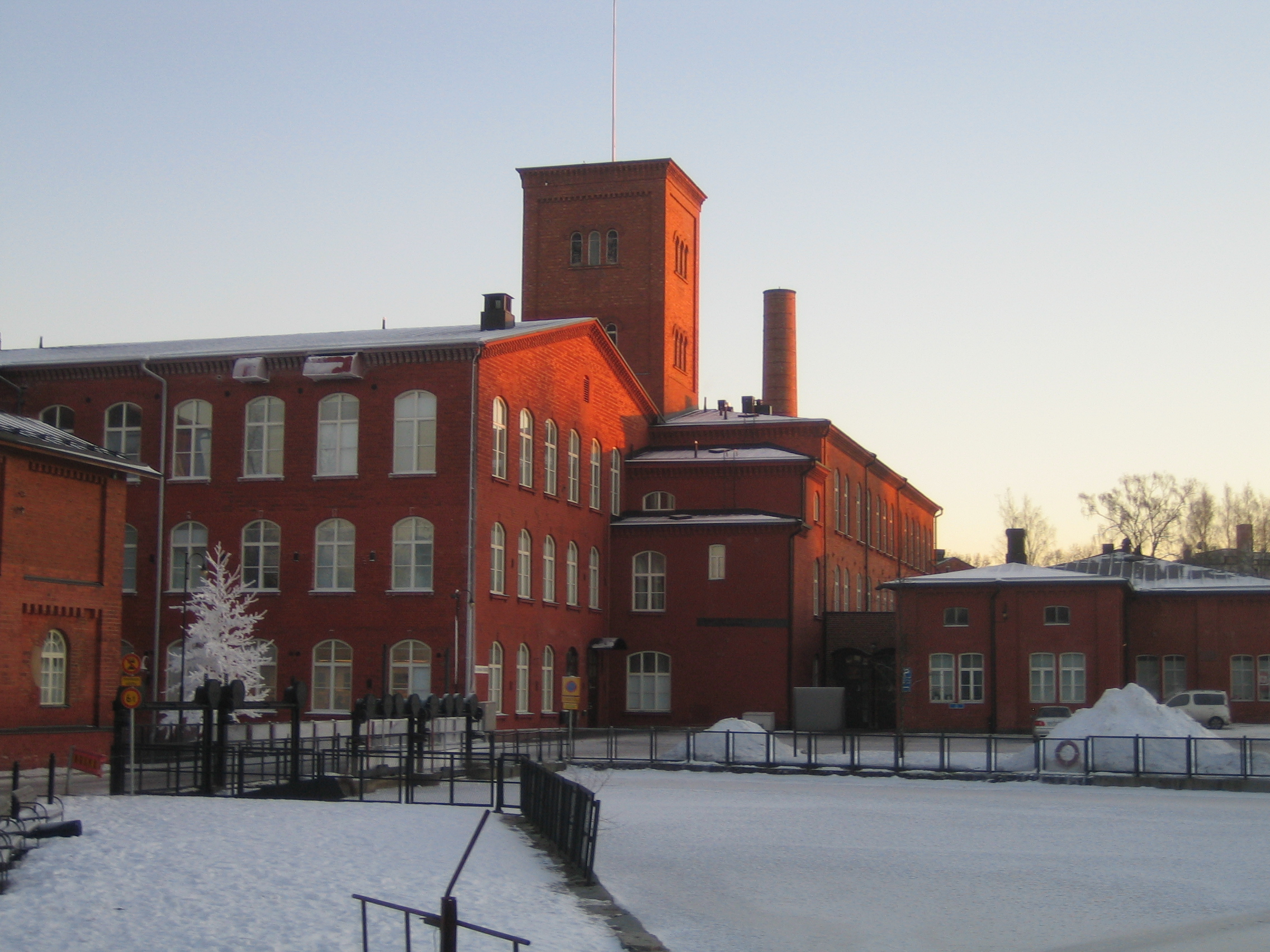
Spinning mill buildings on the shore of Kuhalankoski. The HAMK Häme University of Applied Sciences has its premises in these buildings.

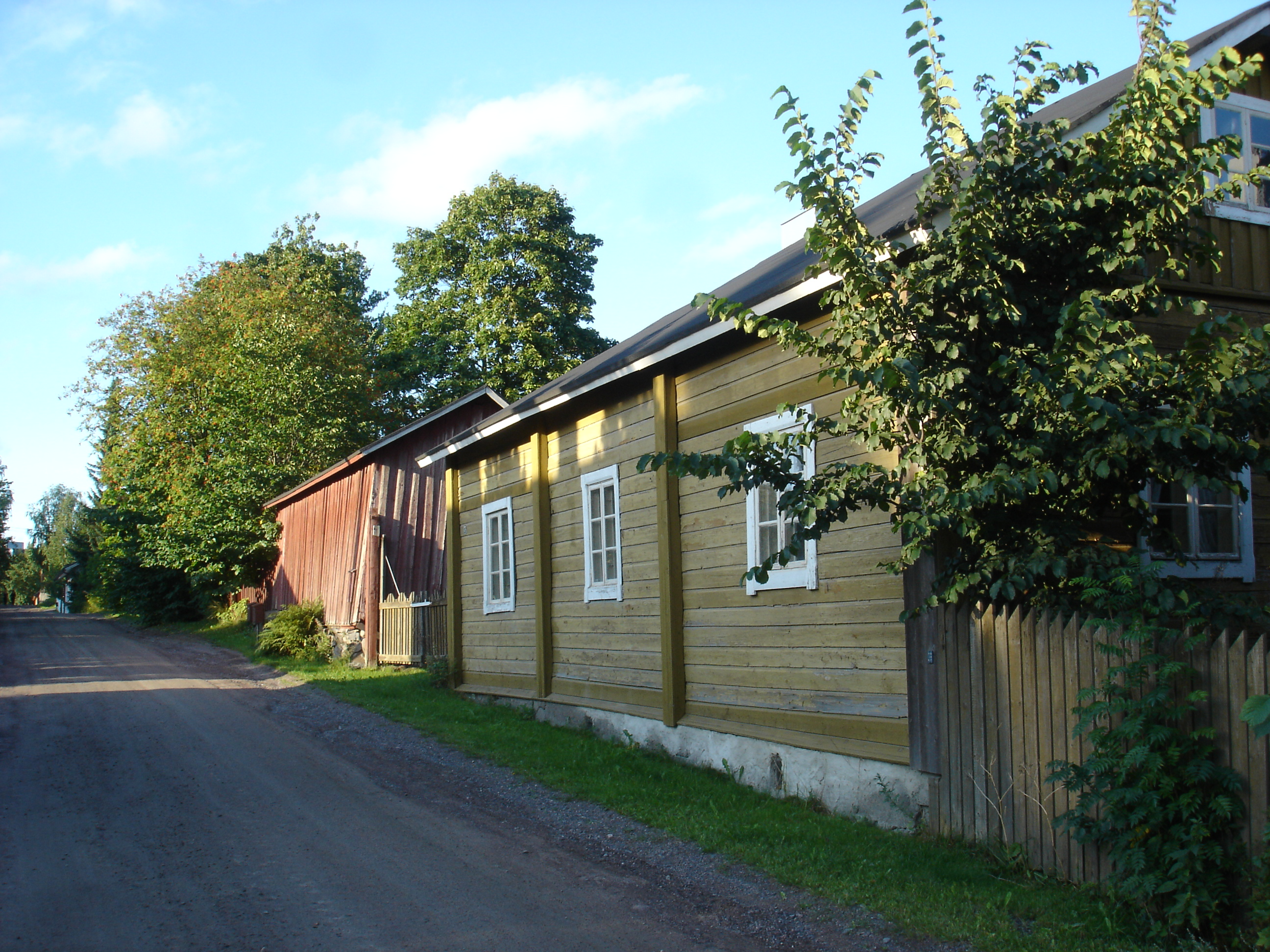
Wooden houses in Kalliomäki

In statistics related to basic statistical units, the city of Forssa is divided into three major districts, twenty statistical districts and thirty minor districts. The three major districts are Keskustaajama (the part of the central conurbation going over the municipal boundaries and its surrounding countryside), Parkkiaro (a rural area in the middle of Forssa) and Entinen Koijärvi (the core areas of the former municipality of Koijärvi). The villages of Kokko and Matku, partly annexed to Urjala, are not part of the Entinen Koijärvi major district. On the other hand, the southern part of the statistical district of Kojo, part of the major district, was not part of the municipality of Koijärvi but instead the market town of Forssa. The statistical district of Kojo also includes the Lempää area, formerly part of the municipality of Tammela.

The districts according to the basic statistical units are not necessarily exactly the same as the districts according to the National Land Survey of Finland, because the statistical units can include for example areas classified in the country register. In articles about districts they have been identified with the correspondingly named statistical units. The name of the statistical unit differs from the name of the district in two cases, where the name given by the National Land Survey is used:

- The Kuhala district is the Tölö statistical unit
- The Linikkala district is the Kalliomäki statistical unit

Also the name of Pikku-Muolaa is often spelled Pikkumuolaa.

=== The Keskustaajama major district ===
The 16 districts in the Keskustaajama major district are listed alphabetically here. The numbers in parentheses are the official order numbers of the National Land Survey.

- Haudankorva (6.)
- Järvenpää (11.)
- Kaikula (9.)
- Keskusta (1.)
- Kivimäki (10.)
- Korkeavaha (4.)
- Kuhala (7.)
- Kuusto (12.)
- Lamminranta (3.)
- Linikkala (5.)
- Ojalanmäki (2.)
- Paavola (15.)
- Pikku-Muolaa (13.)
- Pispanmäki (14.)
- Talsoila (8.)
- Vieremä (16.)

=== The Parkkiaro major district ===
The district of Parkkiaro forms a major district by itself, and is one of the districts (statistical units) of Forssa. The number in parentheses is an official number of the National Land Survey.

- Parkkiaro (17.)

=== The Entinen Koijärvi major district ===
The major district of Entinen Koijärvi consists of three statistical units, which are not considered as districts.

- Kojo (477 inhabitants) consists of the central area of the former municipality of Koijärvi. Kojo includes the former church area of Koijärvi, which does not constitute a conurbation. The Koijärvi church and the Kojo school are located in Kojo.
- Matku (523 inhabitants) is located in the western part of the former municipality of Koijärvi. The railway between Turku and Toijala goes through Forssa at the district of Matku, which was formerly its own conurbation. Matku is no longer considered a conurbation after its population fell below 200. The Matku railway station has been dismantled and there has not been station traffic in the area for a long time.
- Suonpää (217 inhabitants) consists of the northern areas of the former municipality of Koijärvi.

== Villages ==
The land register villages listed here do not have borders conforming to the borders of the districts or statistical units listed above. The villages are divided based on whether they were part of the Forssa market town or the municipality of Koijärvi before the 1969 annexation. The numbers in parentheses after the names are index numbers announced by the National Land Survey.

=== Forssa market town area ===
Villages located in the Forssa market town area were:

- Haudankorva (401)
- Järvenpää (402)
- Kuhala (405)
- Kuusto (406)
- Linikkala (408)
- Lunttila (409)
- Talsoila (413)
- Vieremä (414)

=== Koijärvi area ===
Villages located in the municipality of Koijärvi, annexed to Forssa, were:

- Kojo (403)
- Kokko (404)
- Kölli (407)
- Matku (410)
- Menonen (411)
- Raitoo (412)

=== Inconsistencies with the municipal division ===
The area of the former market town of Forssa also contains parts of the villages of Jokioinen (415) and Kaukjärvi (416), but these villages are mainly located in the neighbouring municipalities of Jokioinen and Tammela. However, Tammela also contains parts of the villages of Haudankorva, Linikkala and Lunttila, but these villages are mainly located in Forssa.

Likewise, of the villages located in the former municipality of Koijärvi, Kojo is partly located in Tammela and Matku is partly located in Urjala. In the annexation, the village of Kojo was mainly annexed to Urjala and the village of Menonen is also partly located in Urjala.

== Urban areas ==
In late 2017 Forssa had a population of 17,185, of which 15,518 lived in urban areas, 1,511 in sparsely populated areas and 156 at unknown locations. The proportion of urban areas in Forssa is 91.1%. The municipality has only one urban area, the Forssa central urban area. In addition to Forssa, the central urban area spreads over to the municipalities of Jokioinen and Tammela. The Forssa central urban area has a total population of 21,236 and a surface area of 37,14 square kilometres.

== Politics ==
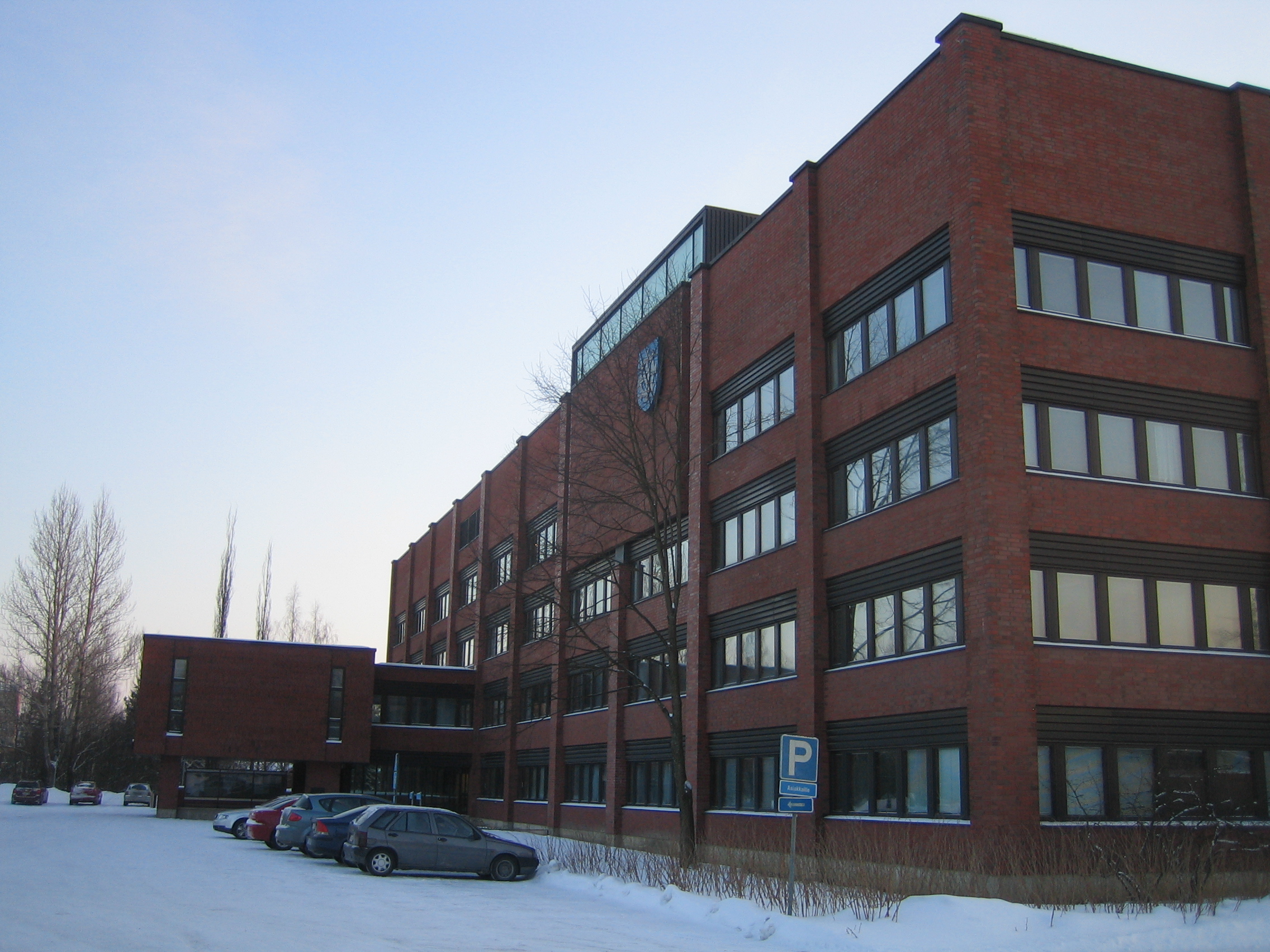
The Forssa city hall

Up to the 1992 election, Forssa has had a characteristic left-wing majority in its city council. In parliamentary elections, Forssa has been historically a left-wing majority municipality, and in elections from 1983 to 2011 SDP has been the largest party up to 2007, when it fell to second place. Also in presidential elections the SDP candidate has received the most votes.

Today the Parliament of Finland has one member from Forssa:

- Sanni Grahn-Laasonen (National Coalition Party), member of parliament since 2011, minister of the environment from 2014 to 2015, minister of education and culture from 2015 to 2017, minister of education from 2017 to 2019.

Previously there have been more members of parliament from Forssa.

The city council of Forssa has 43 seats. In the season from 2021 to 2025 the largest party is SDP, holding 13 seats.

== Business ==
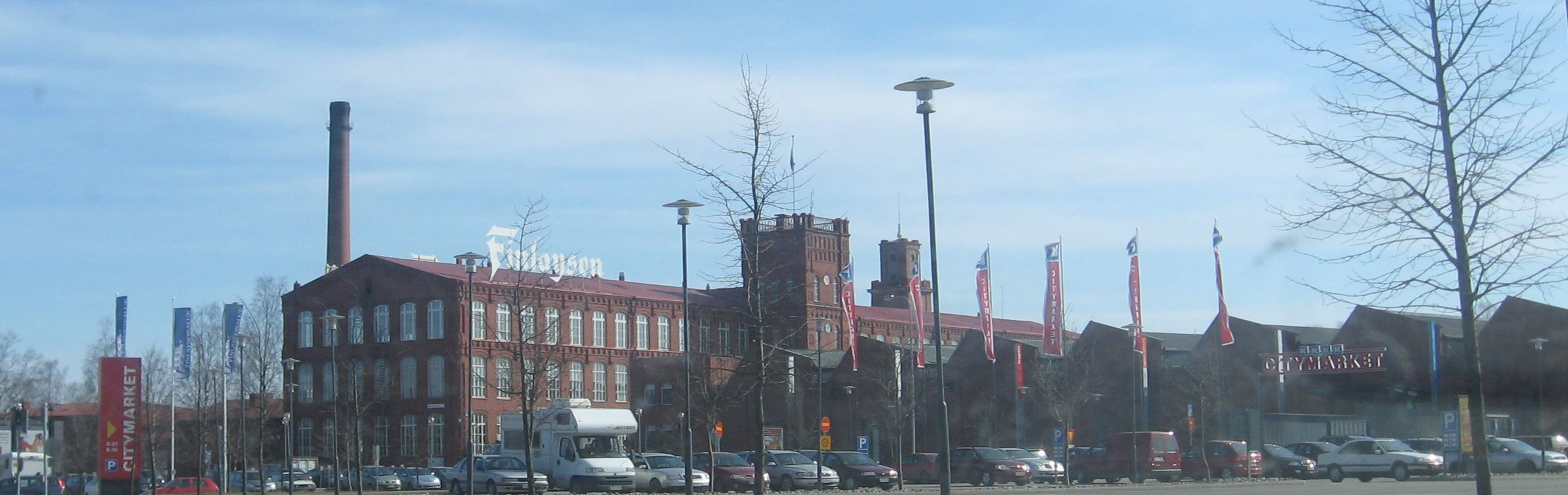
The former spinning mill now hosts a CityMarket grocery store and companies in the service industry.

=== Employment structure ===
In 2009 Forssa had 8,724 jobs, which were divided among the business sectors as follows:

- agriculture and forestry: 184 (2.1%)
- secondary sector: 2,953 (33.8%)
- services: 5,530 (63.4%)
- unknown: 57 (0.7%)

The secondary sector of the economy is still a significant business, but its proportion of the jobs has decreased noticeably. The proportion of the secondary sector was at its highest at 55.7% in 1975. The total number of jobs in Forssa had also decreased, the number of jobs was at its highest at 11,000 in 1990. During the early 1990s depression in Finland, the city lost about 2,000 jobs by 1995. Agriculture is practised in Forssa mainly in the area of the former municipality of Koijärvi.

The textile industry started by Wahren in the 19th century was the largest employer in the city up to the 1970s. After this, the construction industry rose to the largest industry thanks to the increase of activity of the company Rakennusvalmiste Oy founded by Armas Puolimatka. The third mineral wool factory of A. Ahlström (now known as Saint-Gobain Isover) was officially inaugurated at Pilvenmäki on 13 Octobner 1971. The factory had been undergoing test runs for a month before this.

Today the food industry is the largest industry in Forssa. HK Ruokatalo Oy has concentrated a large part of its activity in Forssa. The company Atria also has activities in the city after it bought the local company Liha ja Säilyke. The product label Forssan still remains on the market. The meat refinery company Hakala Oy represents the local food industry.

=== Largest companies ===
Notable employers in Forssa include:

- the city of Forssa
- HKScan
- Atria
- Punamusta
- Parma
- Parmarine
- Saint-Gobain Isover
- Vansco Electronics
- Tambest Glass Solutions
- DA-Group
- Aste Finland
- the wellbeing consortium of the Forssa region (FSHKY)

=== Employment situation ===
Forssa has traditionally been self-sufficient in employment. According to a 2009 statistic, the self-sufficiency rate was 125.5%. There are 3,444 outside people employed in Forssa, of which 2,299 are from the Forssa region and 1,145 from elsewhere. 39.5% of the jobs employ people living outside Forssa. According to a 2009 statistics 6,950 people from Forssa were employed. The most of them were employed in Forssa and 1,670 were employed elsewhere. Of the people employed outside Forssa, 737 people were employed in the Forssa region and 933 elsewhere in Finland. Thus 24.0% of the employed people in Forssa were employed outside their home city.

In 1990 the unemployment rate in Forssa was only 5.2%. During the following years, employment increased rapidly, coming to its highest in 1993. At the time a quarter of the people were unemployed. After this employment started to decrease, but increased again in 2008. Even at its lowest, the employment rate in Forssa was about twice as high as before the early 1990s depression. In 2018 the unemployment rate in Forssa was 12.8%, the highest in Kanta-Häme. The unemployment rate has been decreasing since 2016. The unemployment situation in Forssa is more serious than in Kanta-Häme or the Hämeenlinna and Riihimäki regions.

The Ministry of Economic Affairs and Employment named Forssa as an area of sudden structure change from 2008 to 2009 because of layoffs concerning over 500 employees. This was because of layoffs in the following companies:

- Finlayson-Forssa announced layoffs and closed its unprofitable plastic factory in 2007. In 2008 the company went bankrupt.
- Helkama Forste closed its factory in Forssa in 2008, moving production to Hungary and Russia.
- In October 2008 Novart closed its kitchen utensil factory in Forssa, concentrating production in Nastola.

Other layoffs in the past years have included:

- The Vapo Timber sawmill in Forssa closed in 2006.
- The food industry companies HK Ruokatalo and Atria have laid some of their workers off.
- Finlayson closed its Forssa factory in March 2009.
- In August 2012 Fenestra closed its window factory in Forssa.

== Education ==
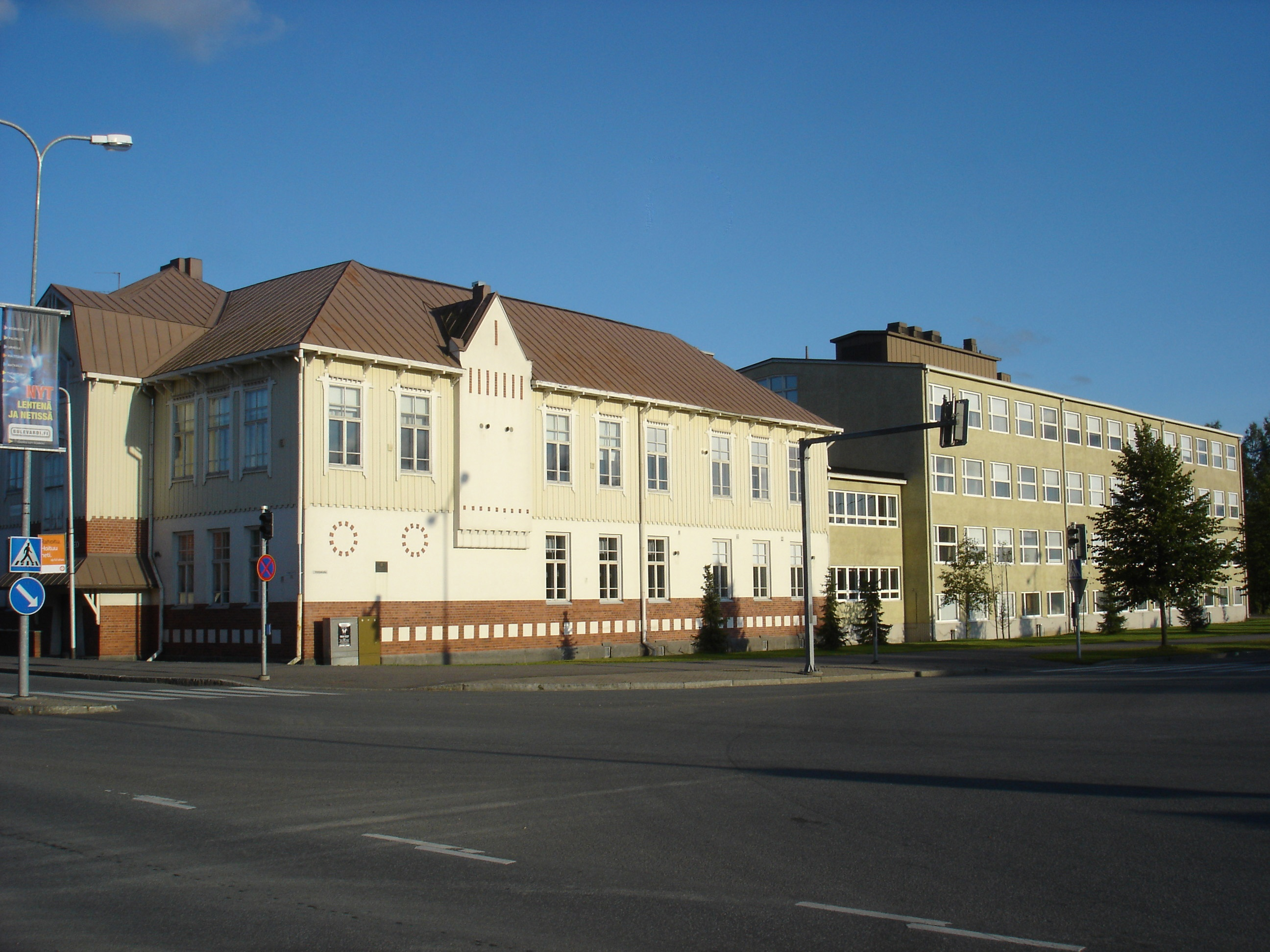
The Forssa Common Lyceum

There are currently eight primary schools in Forssa. The Haudankorpi lower stage primary school was discontinued in spring 1998. The Keskuskoulu and Kuhala school were formed into comprehensive primary schools containing all grades when the pupils from the Haudankorpi lower stage school were moved to Kuhala and the Linikkala upper stage primary school was merged into the Keskuskoulu school. At the same time, the Kuhala gymnasium was discontinued and gymnasium education was concentrated on the Linikkala gymnasium, which was renamed the Forssa Common Lyceum.

=== Lower stage schools (grades 1 to 6) ===
There are four lower stage primary schools in Forssa. Children from the northern part of the central urban area study at the Koijärvi school.

- Heikka school
- Koijärvi school
- Talsoila school
- Vieremä school

=== Comprehensive schools (grades 1 to 9) ===
There are two comprehensive schools in Forssa. Here the term comprehensive school refers to a school with all primary school grades 1 to 9.

- Keskuskoulu school
- Akvarelli all-activity house (primary school grades and early education)

=== Higher education ===
The Forssa Common Lyceum provides secondary education in Forssa, continuing the traditions of the oldest countryside secondary school in Finland.

Vocational education is provided by the education council of southwestern Tavastia. The council has combined the Forssa vocational institute (FAI) with the Faktia institute providing adult vocational education. Both youth and adult vocational education are located in the same premises except for the crane training in Faktia. Faktia is the only institute in Finland to provide tower and mobile crane training.

Higher vocational education is provided by the Forssa branch of the HAMK Häme University of Applied Sciences.

== Other services ==
Forssa belongs to the service area of the Rescue Department of Kanta-Häme and has a fire station staffed by a permanent fire brigade. The same fire station also hosts the Forssa semi-permanent fire brigade. There are three voluntary fire brigades in Forssa: Forssan VPK, Matkun VPK and Suonpään VPK.

== Culture and events ==
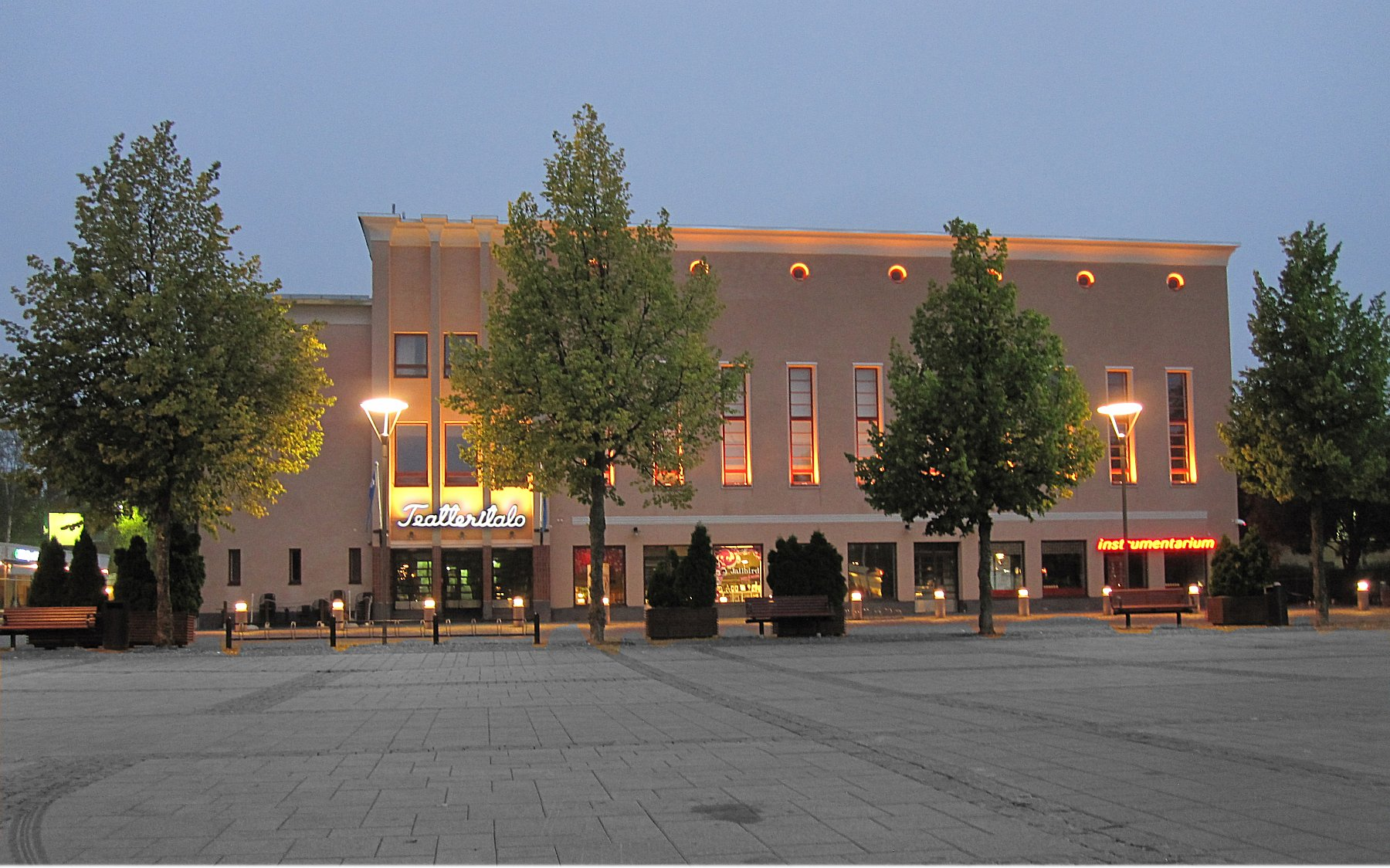
Forssa Theatre (Teatteritalo)

The Forssa cultural centre is located in a historical spinning mill area. The city hosts several museums and a theatre.

Forssa is known for its annual big events like in the first weekend of August held Holjat Festival as well as car enthusiasts get together in Pick-Nick, the biggest event in Northern Europe. A tradition is also annual Suvi-ilta Maraton - the second biggest marathon event in Finland. Suvi-ilta Maraton takes place a weekend before Midsummer. There is also a fairly popular harness racing track in Forssa. During the late summer and early autumn, the annual silent film festivals are held in Forssa.

== Sports ==
The town was co-host of the 1982 FIBA Europe Under-16 Championship for Women.

== Notable people ==
- Aarne Ervi (1910–1977)
- Pentti Niinivuori (1931–1988)
- Asko Parpola (*1941)
- Kalevi Aho (*1949)
- Juha Jyrkkiö (*1959)
- Mika Helkearo (*1960)
- Anita Nyman Hakala (*1971)
- Miia Nuutila (*1972)
- Jonna Tervomaa (*1973)
- Johanna Paasikangas-Tella (*1974)
- Satu Rämö (*1980)
- Tuukka Kotti (*1981)
- Kirsi Perälä (*1982)
- Jussi Heikkilä (*1983)
- Sanni Grahn-Laasonen (*1983)
- Roosa Koskelo (*1991)
- Juuse Saros (*1995)
- Juuso Nevalainen (*1997)
- Elian Lehto (*2000)

== International relations ==
=== Twin towns — Sister cities ===
Forssa is twinned with:

- Södertälje, Sweden
- Sarpsborg, Norway
- Struer, Denmark
- Serpukhov, Russia
- Gödöllő, Hungary
- Sault Ste. Marie, Canada
