= Leivonmäki National Park =

National park in Joutsa, Finland

- IUCN category II (national park)
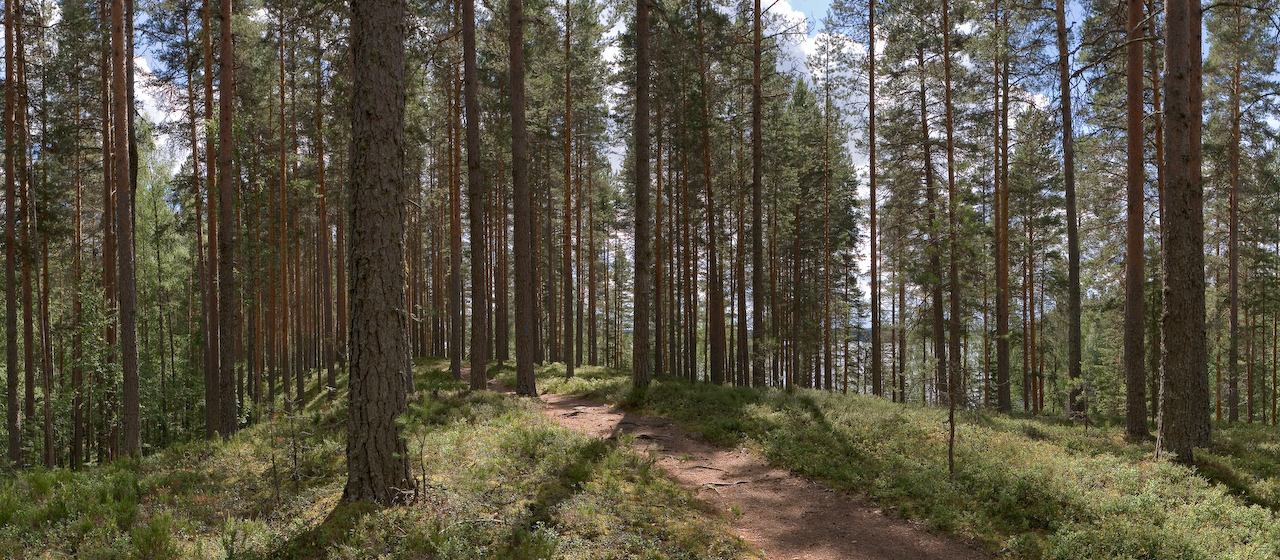

- Location within Finland
- Location: Central Finland, Finland
- Coordinates: 61°56′N 026°02′E
- Area: 29 km^{2} (11 sq mi)
- Established: 2003
- Visitors: 29,100 (in 2024)
- Governing body: Metsähallitus
- Website: https://www.luontoon.fi/en/destinations/leivonmaki-national-park

Leivonmäki National Park (Finnish: Leivonmäen kansallispuisto) is a national park in Central Finland, in the municipality of Joutsa. It was established in 2003 and covers 29 square kilometres (11 sq mi).

The park is often described as a microcosm of Central Finland, typical scenery consisting of swamps, shores of a medium-sized lake Rutajärvi and esker forests.

In recent years, visitation has grown steadily, with approximately 29,100 visits recorded in 2024.

== History ==
The origins of Leivonmäki National Park lie in conservation debates that began in the 1970s, when proposals emerged to protect the area's extensive mires, lakeshores, and distinctive esker forests. At that time, the landscape was under pressure from competing land uses: portions of Haapasuo and nearby mires were important for local peat extraction, and parts of the area were used for forestry and gravel excavation. The suggestion to conserve large wetland and forest tracts sparked significant local debate, reflecting tensions between nature protection goals and the economic interests of the surrounding communities.

In the 1980s, the Finnish state began to acquire parcels of land in the Leivonmäki area, using both negotiated purchase and compulsory acquisition where necessary. In 1991, the core Haapasuo–Syysniemi area was designated a nature reserve, representing a decisive move to secure key bog, lakeshore and forest habitats for conservation.

The process culminated in the establishment of Leivonmäki National Park in 2003, with the boundaries based on the previously protected core and expanded over adjacent areas to better represent the region's characteristic landscapes and ecological values.

== Gallery ==
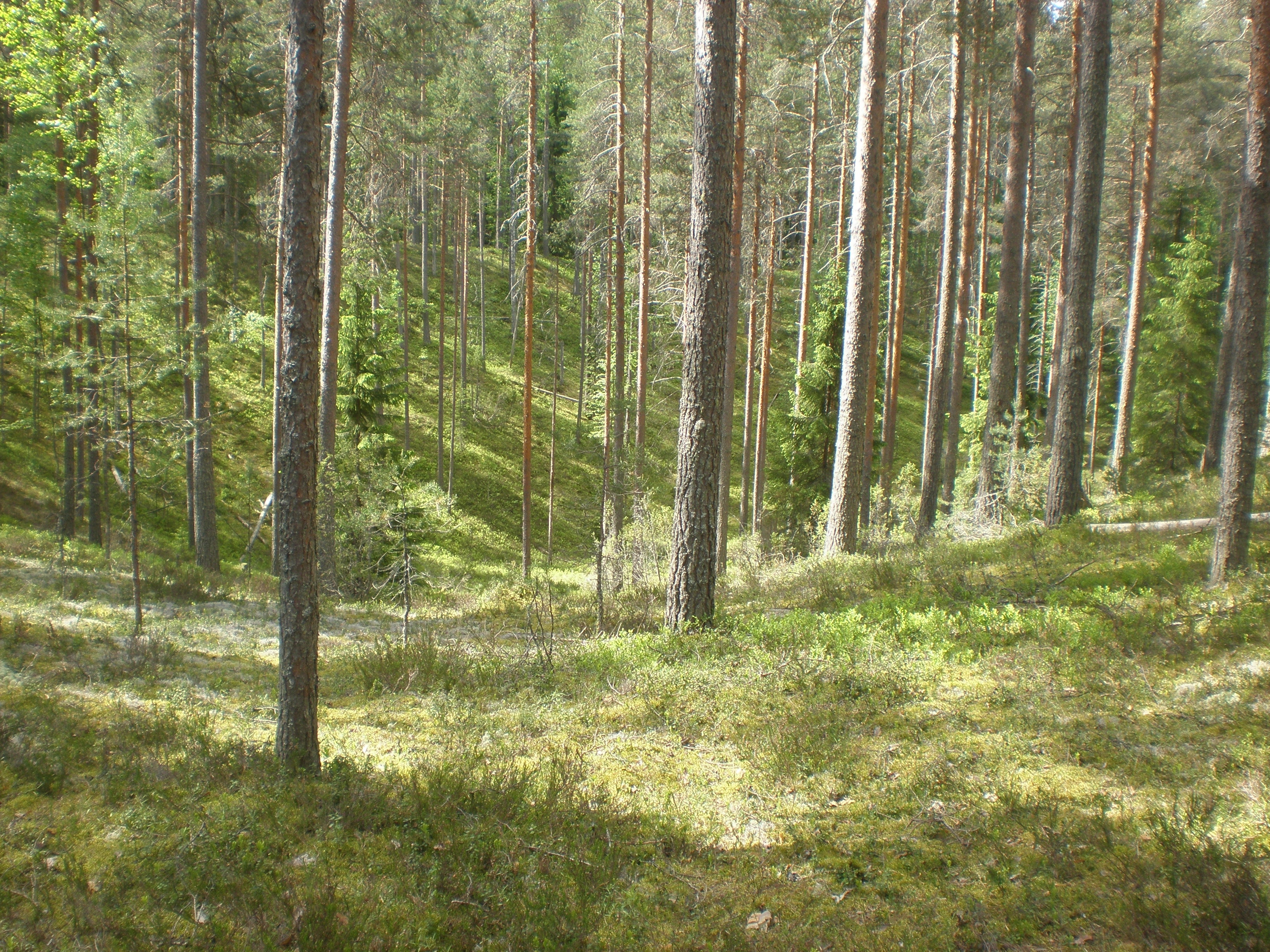
Forest at Leivonmäki National Park

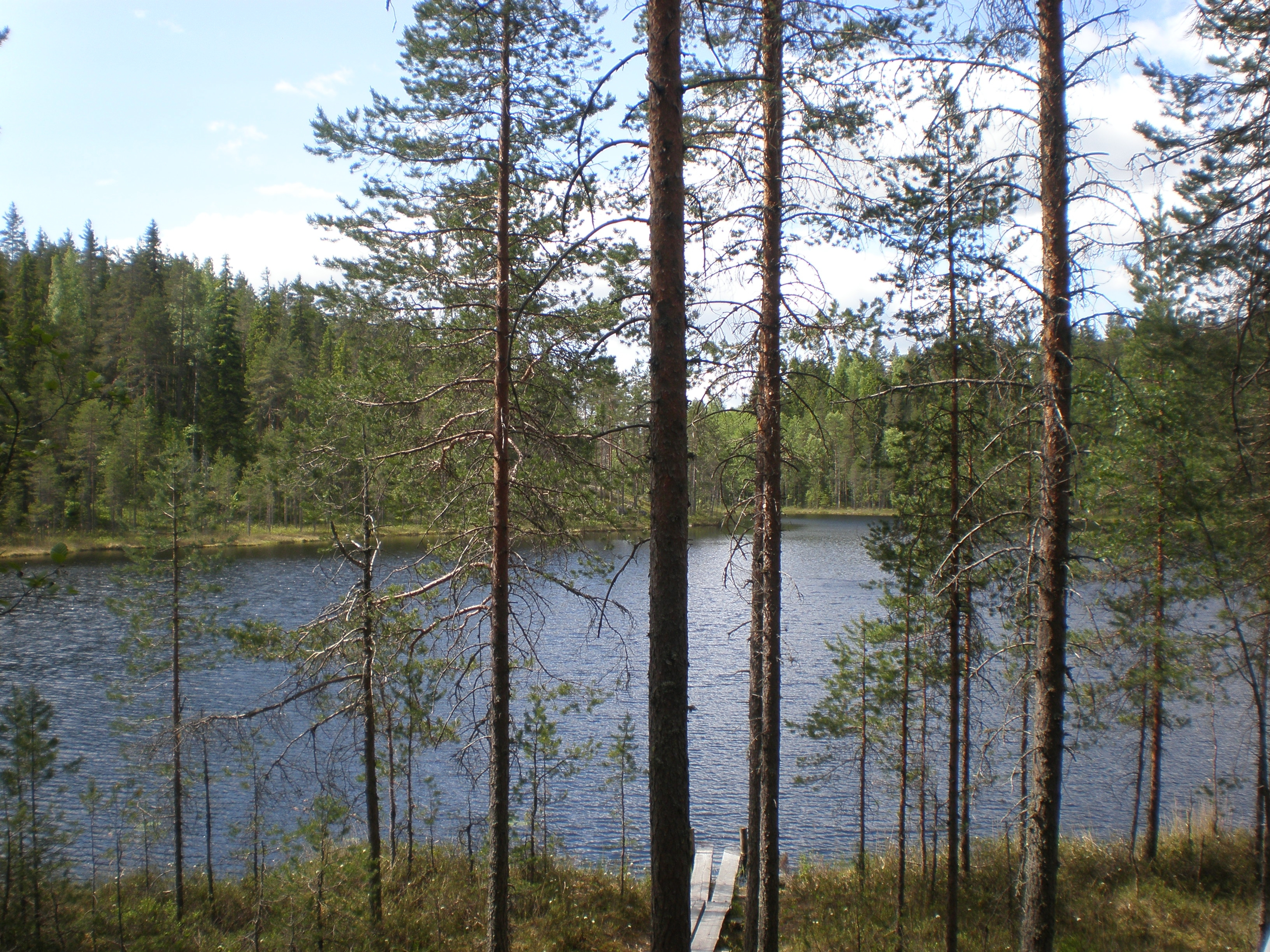
Lake Soimalampi

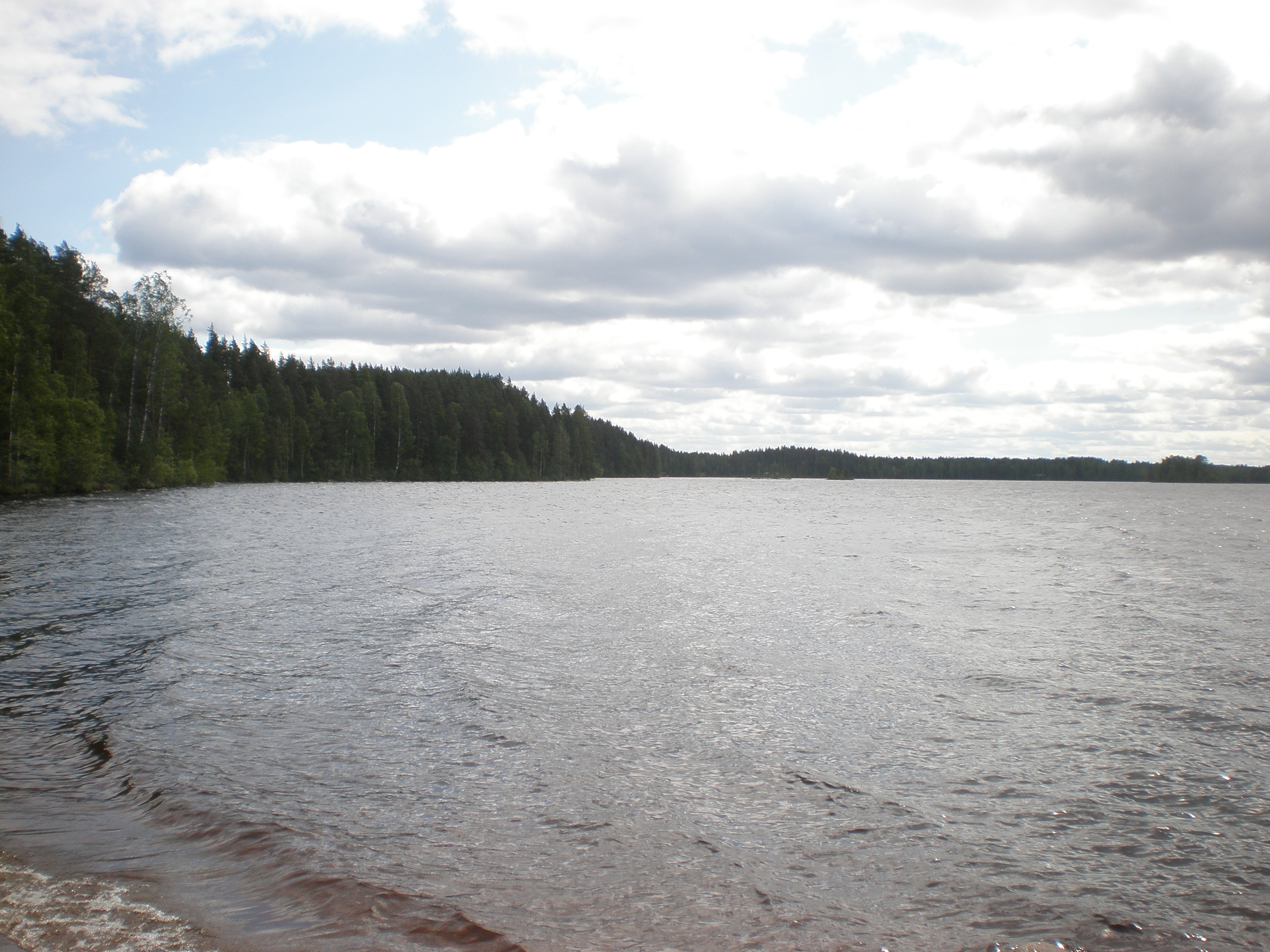
Lake Rutajärvi

== See also ==
- List of national parks of Finland
- Protected areas of Finland
