= Koijärvi Movement =

Finnish environmental movement

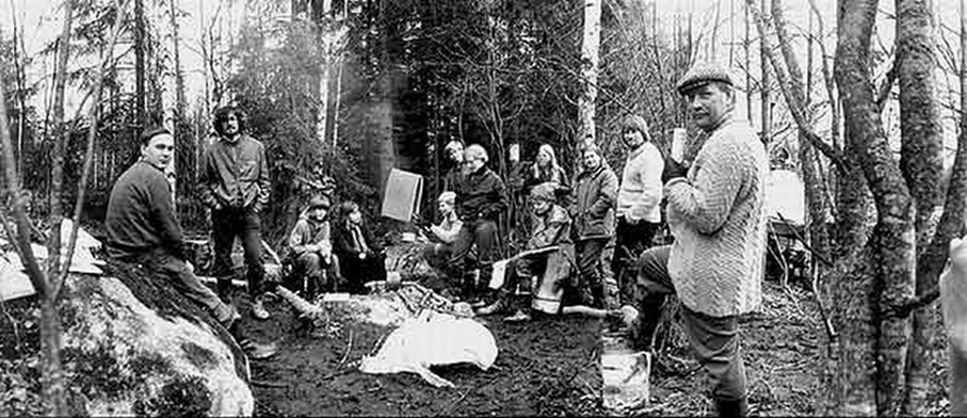
A camp of the Koijärvi Movement on the morning of April 21, 1979. Ville Komsi and Irina Krohn, second and third from the right, would later become members of the Finnish parliament for the Green League.

The Koijärvi Movement (Finnish: Koijärvi-liike, Swedish: Koijärvirörelsen) was a Finnish environmental movement that started in the spring of 1979. Its objective was to prevent the draining of Lake Koijärvi near Forssa, an important bird habitat. The struggle lasted for two years and brought together previously fragmented, small circles of environmental activists to form a national movement. It was one of the most prominent of a wave of environmental actions in Finland at the time that led to the formation of the political party the Green League and the election of Greens to the Finnish parliament and hastened the establishment of a national environmental ministry.

== Background ==
Koijärvi is a shallow lake that was expected to be completely dry up in the 1930s as it was already marked as dry land in the land register at that time. By the 1970s, the area was regarded as one of the "best bird lakes" in the country. In the late 1960s, the lake expanded.

=== Events in Koijärvi ===
At the end of the 1970s, there was a dispute about whether the landowners had the right to dry Lake Koijärvi completely. In April 1979 the landowners dug the drainage ditch without authorization to drain the lake when the resolution of the case in the Water Court (vesioikeus) was delayed in progress. With the information became known to the public. On April 21, 1979, the members of the Koijärvi movement gathered at Koijärvi and built a dam on the spot with their own permission, which was used to keep the lake's water level at a stable level and to prevent the lake's drying project. Activists tied themselves with chains to an excavator brought in to demolish the dam. The police forcefully separated the protesters. The authorities and contractors blew up the dam, but the conservationists built more barriers to the descent ditch.

In 1980, hunger strikers of the Koijärvi movement in Helsinki's Senate square.

According to Timo Järvikoski's research, the members of the movement perceived environmental problems as social issues and tried to criticize the consumer society with their actions. Among the MPs, LKP's Anneli Kivitie and Terhi Nieminen supported the movement in Koijärvi.

=== After the events ===
Charges were brought against those chained for the events in Koijärvi, and the trial in Tammela's engagement court began after a long preparation in May 1982. A total of 112 people, some of whom were minors, were charged to court. The court sessions were held not openly to the public. In December 1982, a total of 101 accused nature conservationists were sentenced to fines for 'snitching and causing harm' to the authorities. The maximum fine was more than 2,000 markka. The accused minors were left untried. The decision was appealed to the Court of Appeal of Turku, which ordered the district court to reconsider the case because a farmer who served as a lay judge had been a party to the case and was therefore prevented. The case eventually reached the Supreme Court, whose decision is summarized as follows:

At the earthmoving site, the defendants had penetrated inside the working radius of the excavator, at which point the machine driver had to give up using the machine, because otherwise he could have intentionally or unintentionally caused bodily injury to the people inside the working radius of the machine and thus committed a crime. The defendants were sentenced to punishment for coercion. So-called civil disobedience was not the kind of basis that would have removed the punishability of the act.

— The Supreme Court internal order (KKO: 1983-II-159)

== Effects ==
Koijärvi was not drained. Partly as a result of the events, an environmental administration was established in Finland in 1983. SDP's Matti Ahde Sorsa was elected as the first Minister of the environment in the fourth government, and Lauri Tarasti, a law graduate, was appointed as the first Head of Office of the Ministry of the Environment.

The Koijärvi area was redeemed to the state. The lake was protected in 1992 and joined the Natura 2000 network and the national bird water protection program. Though the overgrowth of Koijärvi has still continued.

Many leaders of the Koijärvi movement, such as Ville Komsi and Osmo Soininvaara, were involved in founding the Green League. Komsi entered parliament as one of the first two MPs of the green movement (with the other being Kalle Könkkölä) in the 1983 elections. Soininvaara entered the parliament in the 1987 elections and served as Chairman of the Green League from 2001 to 2005. The third Koijärvi activist who subsequently participated in national politics was Pekka Haavisto, who served as the first Minister of the Green Alliance–and at the same time as the first Green Minister of the whole Europe—from 1995 to 1999 (who is a minister of environment and development cooperation in Lipponen's first government). Kai Vaara founded the Katajamäki eco-community. The 10th anniversary of the Koijärvi movement was celebrated in Koijärvi in the spring of 1989.

According to Doctor of Political Science Jukka Tarka, the Koijärvi activists represented a 'new non-violent resistance movement'; according to Tarka, "they did not oppose the police, but they did not help either. They just wanted to protect what they valued."
