= Porras, Tammela =

Village in Tammela, Finland

Coordinates: 60°45′N 23°56′E

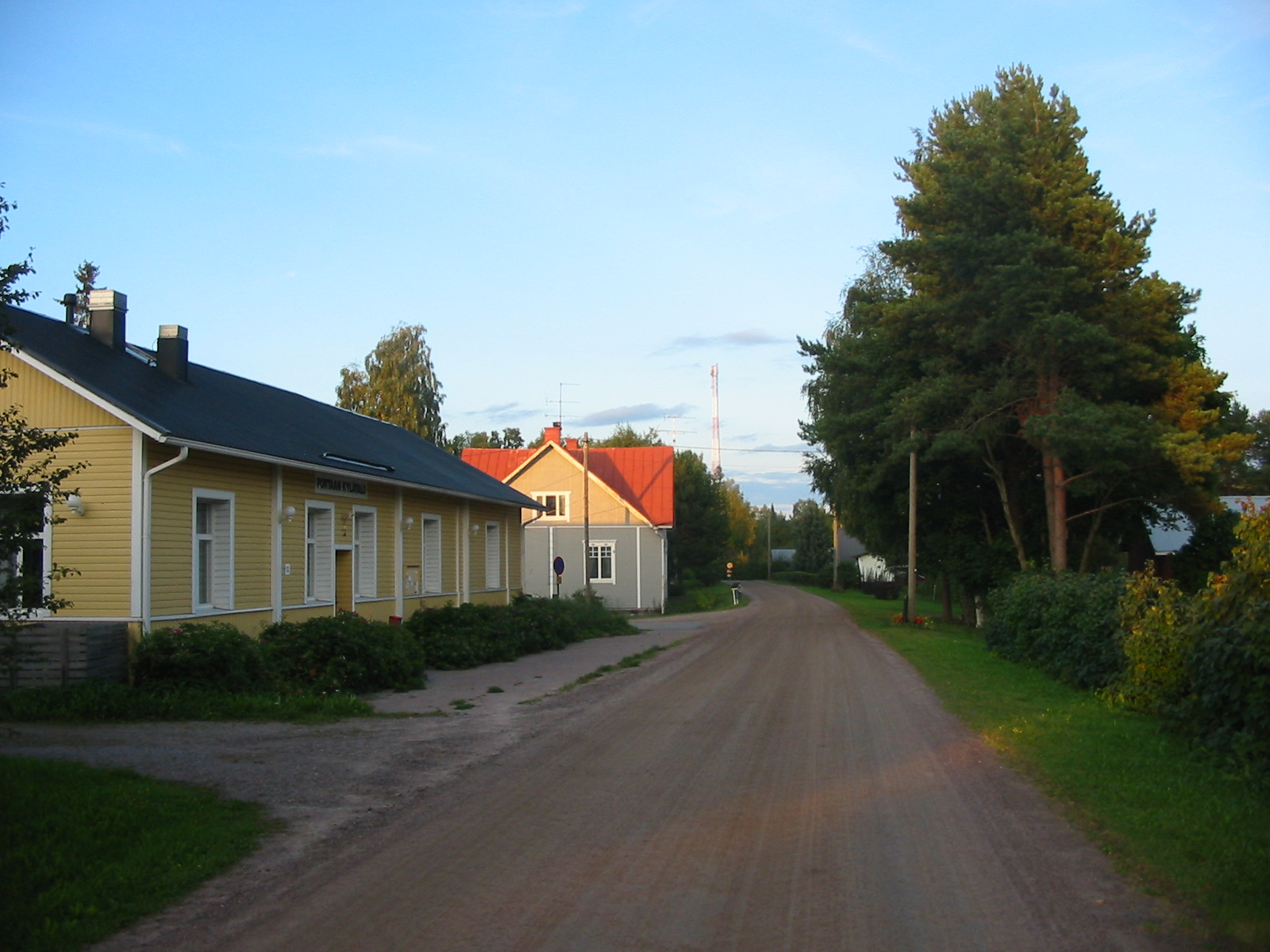
A roadside scenery from Porras.

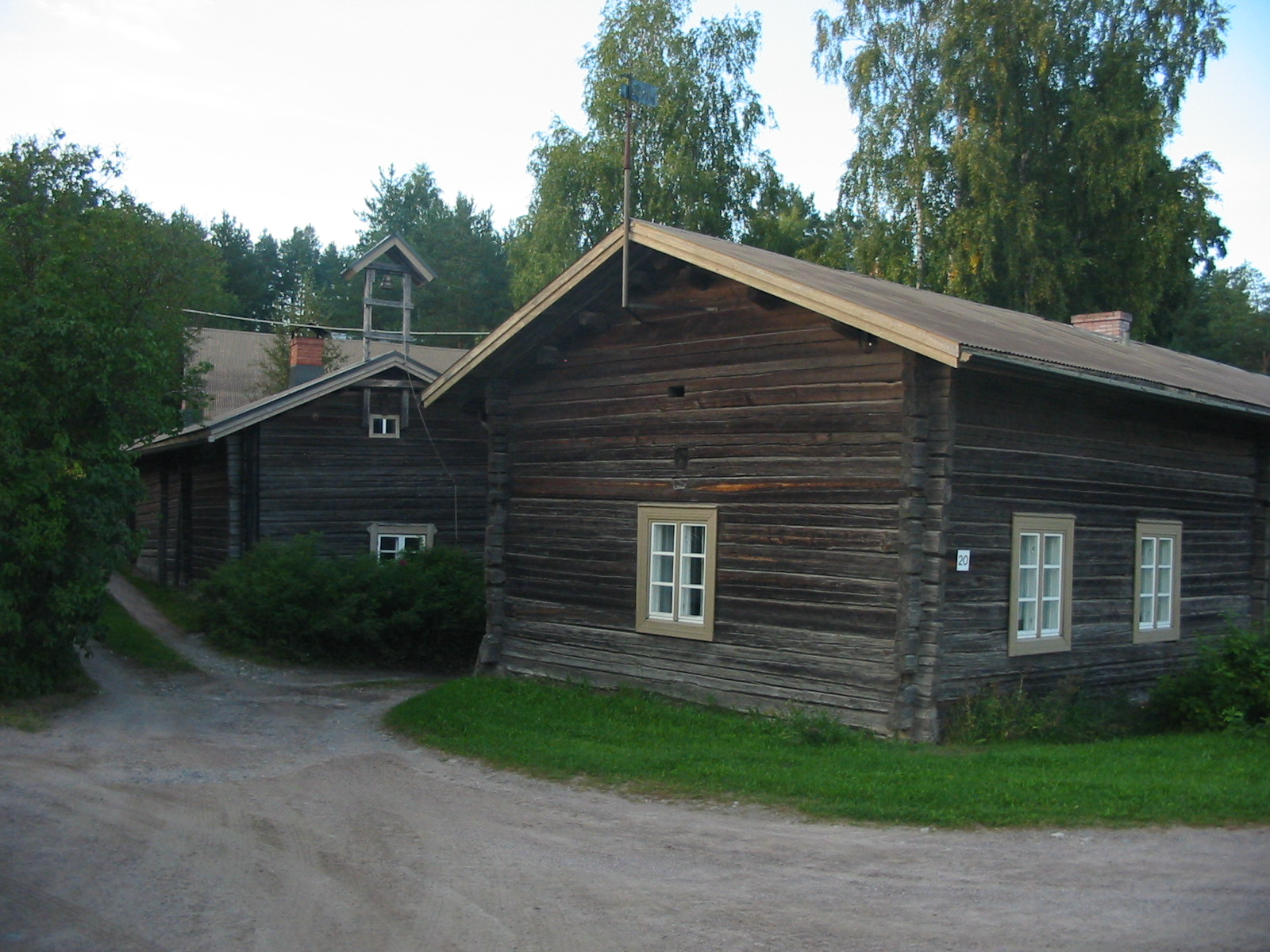
Old wooden buildings in Porras.

Porras is a village in the municipality of Tammela, Finland. It lies on the Häme Ox Road and has a population of almost 400 inhabitants. An active village, it has about 30 active enterprises and nine unions, a school, cafeteria, and post office services. Porras is an old Finnish word for "bridge" or "duckboards"; the name comes from a bridge on the Häme Ox Road by the village.

Albert Edelfelt made paintwork Veräjällä in Tammela in 1889.

== History ==
The village was first mentioned around 1470.

Porras was the main village of an administrative division (hallintopitäjä) from the early 1500s to the 1700s, when the division was split into Tammela and Somero. The division was further subdivided into the fourths (neljänneskunnat) of Pitkäjärvi, Hirsjärvi, Tammela and Jokioinen.
