= Rutajärvi (Leivonmäki) =

Lake in Joutsa, Finland

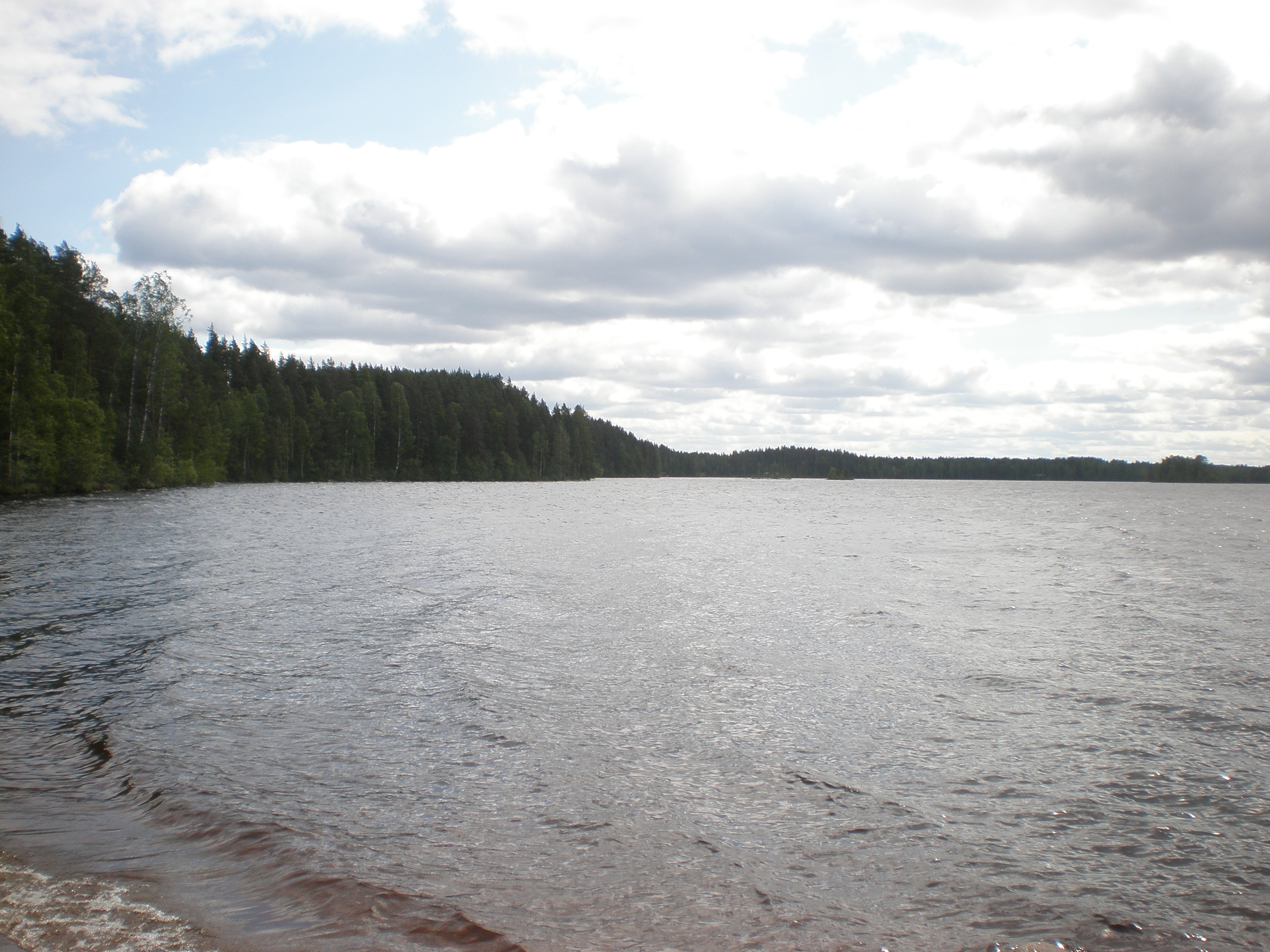
- Rutajärvi at Leivonmäki

- Location within Finland
- Location: Joutsa
- Coordinates: 61.9497°N 26.0724°E
- Lake type: Natural
- Primary outflows: Rutajoki
- Catchment area: Kymijoki
- Basin countries: Finland
- Surface area: 11.204 km^{2} (4.326 sq mi)
- Average depth: 5.27 m (17.3 ft)
- Max. depth: 22 m (72 ft)
- Water volume: 0.059 km^{3} (0.014 cu mi)
- Shore length^{1}: 65.98 km (41.00 mi)
- Surface elevation: 123.1 m (404 ft)
- Frozen: December-April
- Islands: Korpisaari, Niinisaari, Isosaari
- ^{1} Shore length is not a well-defined measure.

Rutajärvi is a medium-sized lake in Joutsa municipality, next to the Leivonmäki National Park in Central Finland region. The western shores of the lake are included to the park.

== See also ==
- List of lakes in Finland
