= Urjala =

- Municipality
- Urjalan kunta Urjala kommun
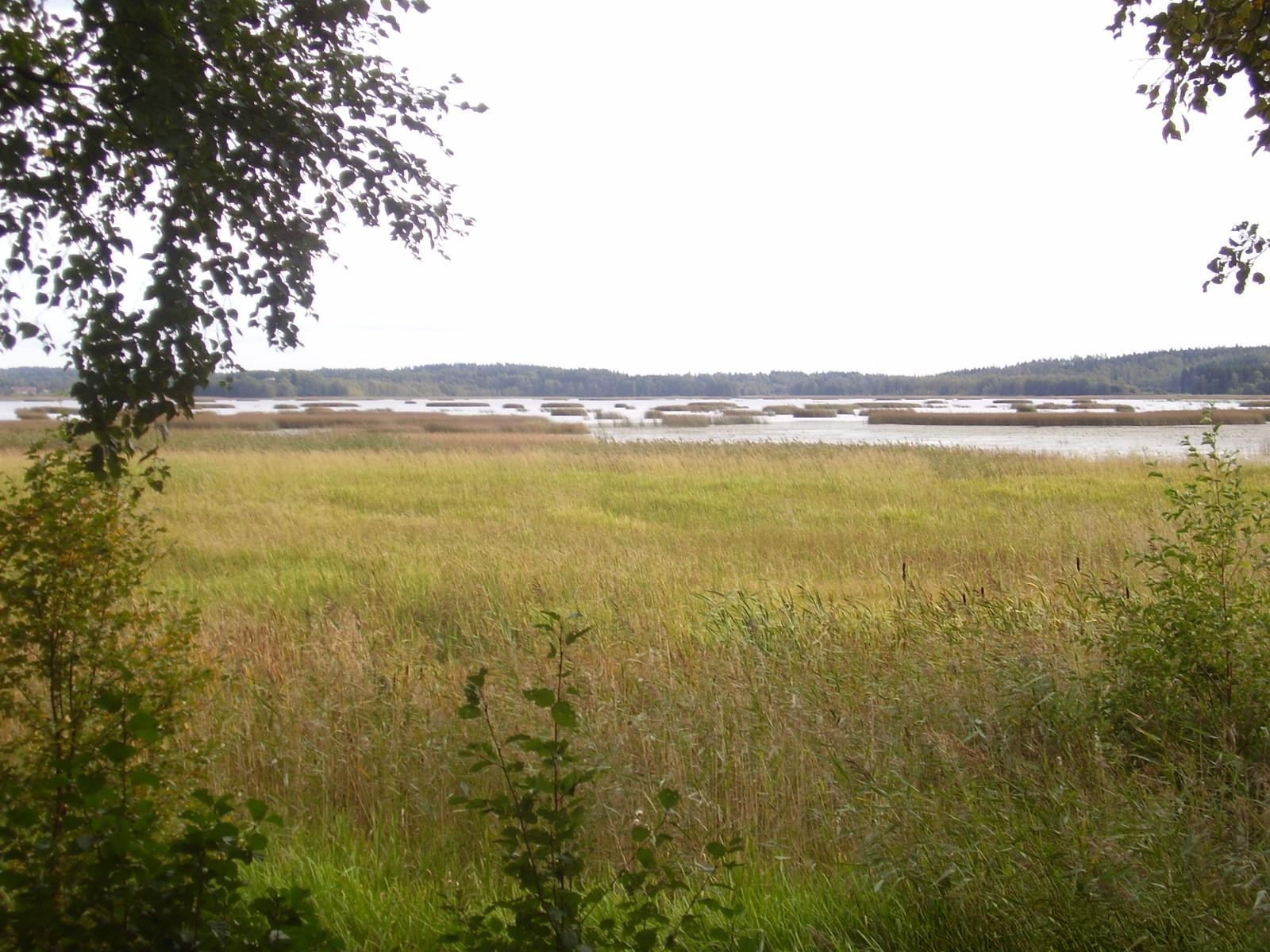
- Kortejärvi Lake in Urjala

- Coat of arms

- Location of Urjala in Finland
- Interactive map of Urjala
- Coordinates: 61°05′N 023°33′E
- Country: Finland
- Region: Pirkanmaa
- Sub-region: Southern Pirkanmaa
- Charter: 1868

Government
  - Municipal manager: Hannu Maijala

Area (2018-01-01)
  - Total: 505.37 km^{2} (195.12 sq mi)
  - Land: 475.53 km^{2} (183.60 sq mi)
  - Water: 30.16 km^{2} (11.64 sq mi)
  - Rank: 182nd largest in Finland

Population (2025-12-31)
  - Total: 4,440
  - Rank: 179th largest in Finland
  - Density: 9.34/km^{2} (24.2/sq mi)

Population by native language
  - Finnish: 96.3% (official)
  - Swedish: 0.2%
  - Others: 3.4%

Population by age
  - 0 to 14: 12.9%
  - 15 to 64: 54%
  - 65 or older: 33.1%
- Time zone: UTC+02:00 (EET)
  - Summer (DST): UTC+03:00 (EEST)
- Website: www.urjala.fi

Urjala (Finnish: [ˈurjɑlɑ]; Swedish: Urjala, also Urdiala) is a municipality of Finland. It is part of the Pirkanmaa region, near the town of Forssa. The municipality has a population of 4,440 (31 December 2025) and covers an area of 505.37 square kilometres (195.12 sq mi) of which 30.16 km^{2} (11.64 sq mi) is water. The population density is 9.34 inhabitants per square kilometre (24.2/sq mi).

Neighbouring municipalities are Akaa, Forssa, Humppila, Hämeenlinna, Punkalaidun, Sastamala, Tammela, and Vesilahti. The city of Tampere is located 60 kilometres (37 mi) north of Urjala.

The municipality is unilingually Finnish.

The oldest glassblowing factory in Finland is located in the village of Nuutajärvi, Urjala.

== Notable individuals ==
- Johan Hampus Furuhjelm, vice-admiral and explorer
- Mimmi Kanervo, one of Finland's first female MPs
- Väinö Linna, author (born in Urjala, although he is most often referred to be from Tampere where he lived most of his adult life)

== Images ==
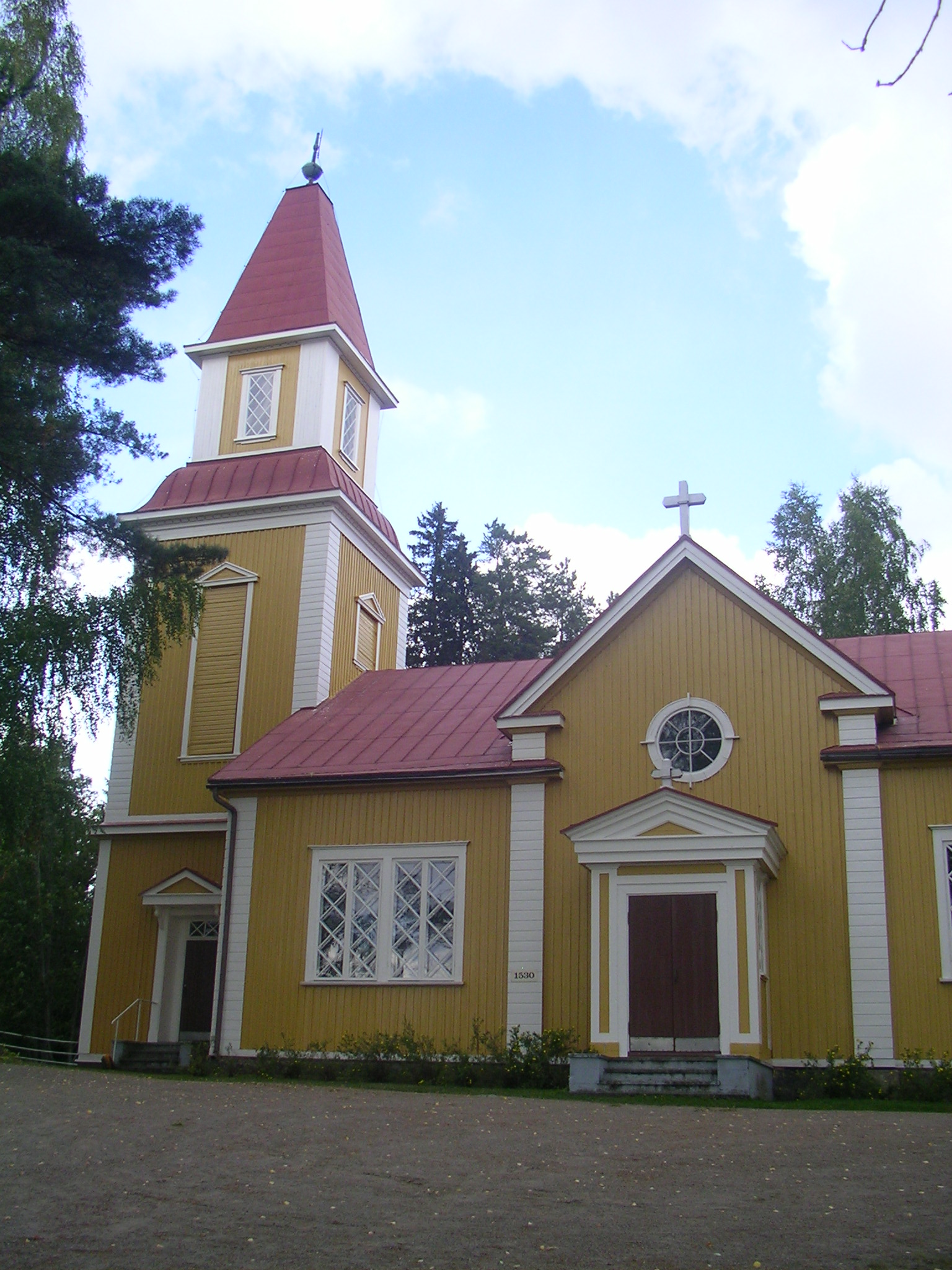
Halkivaha Church

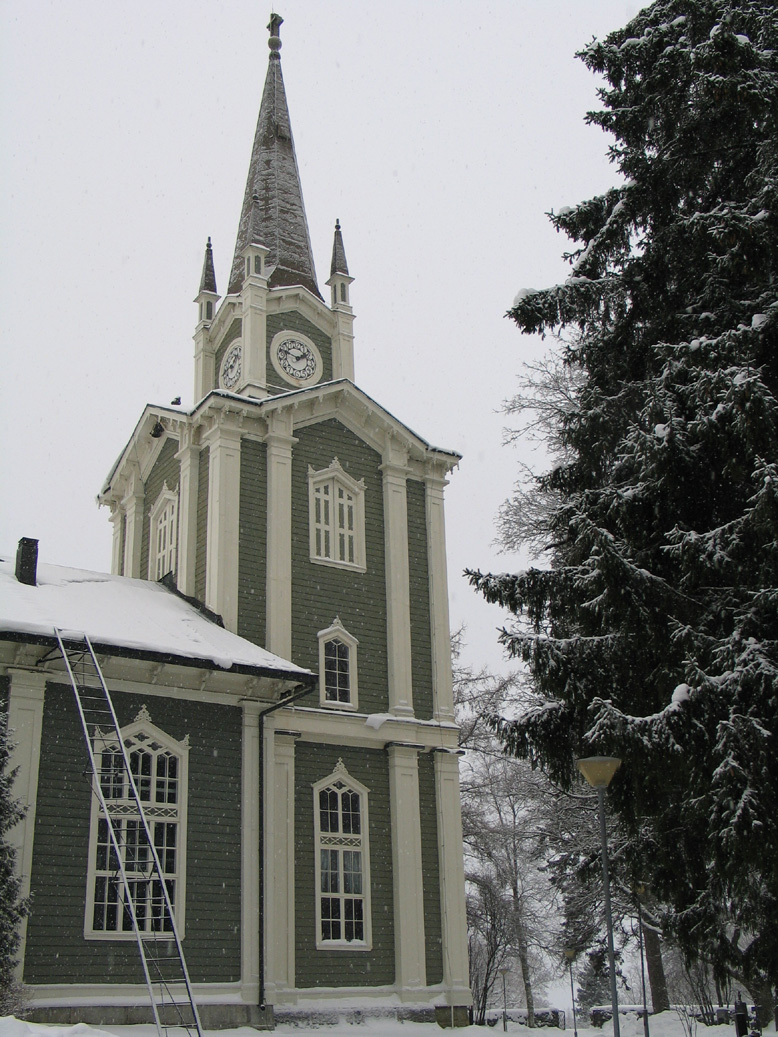
Urjala Church
