= Tarpianjoki =

Coordinates: 61.19296°N 23.766566°E

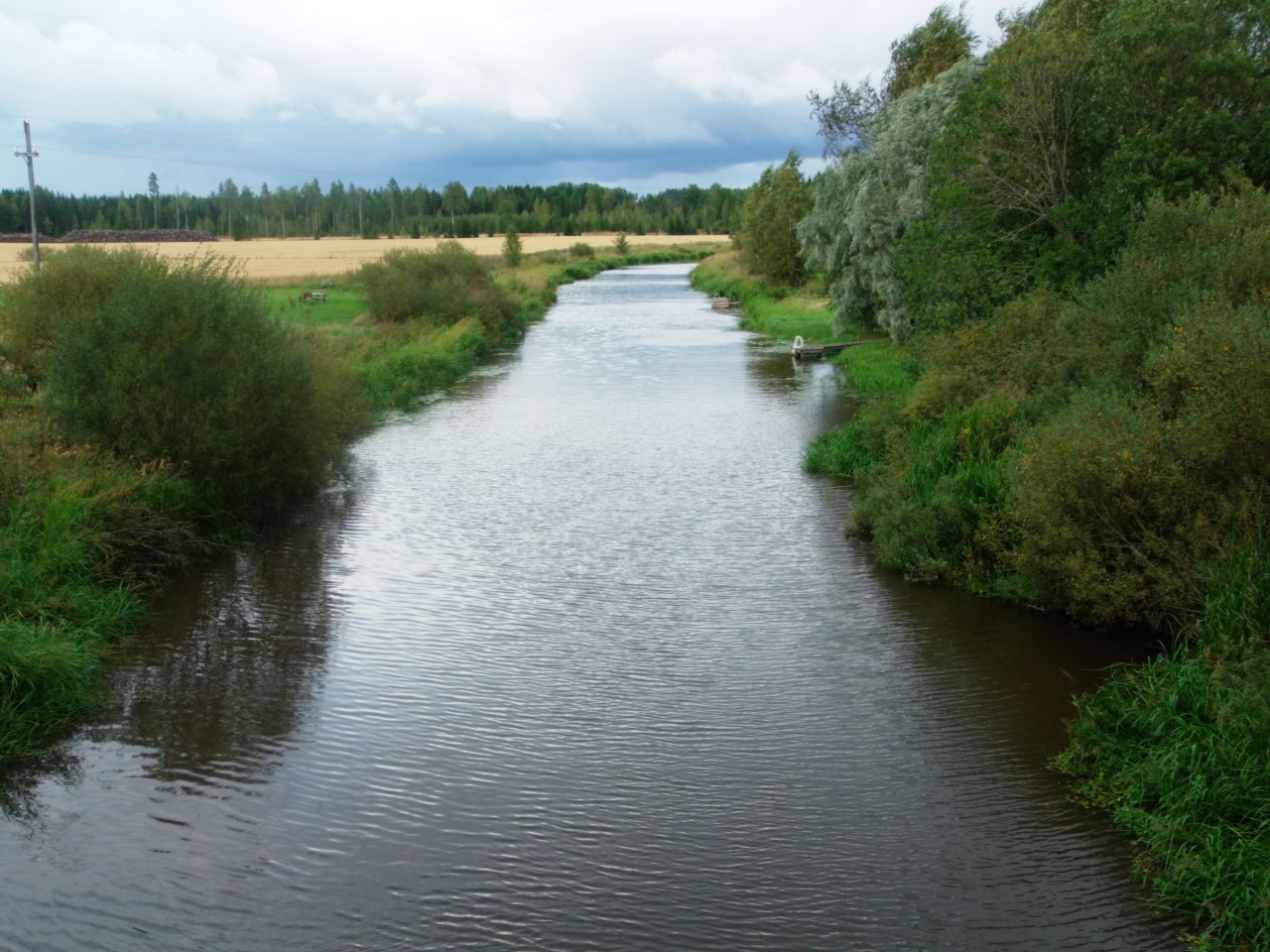

Location
- Country: Finland

Physical characteristics
- Source
  - location: Kotkajärvi
- Length: 65 km (40 mi)

Tarpianjoki, sometimes also Viialanjoki, is a river in Pirkanmaa, Finland.
