= Tammela, Finland =

Tammela
- Municipality
- Tammelan kunta Tammela kommun
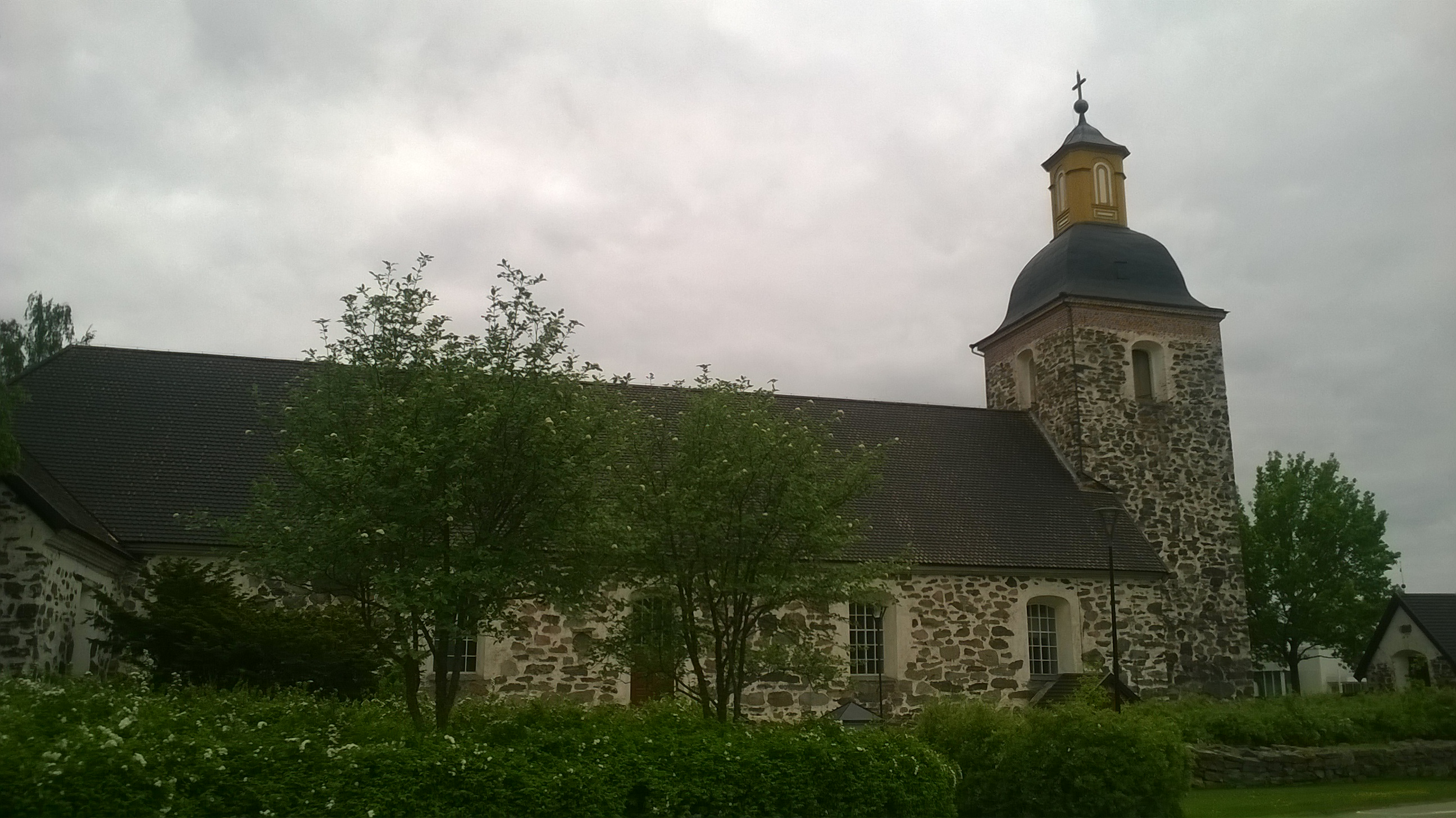
- Stone church of Tammela

- Coat of arms

- Location of Tammela in Finland
- Interactive map of Tammela
- Coordinates: 60°48′N 023°46′E
- Country: Finland
- Region: Kanta-Häme
- Sub-region: Forssa
- Charter: 1868

Government
  - Municipality manager: Kalle Larsson

Population (2025-12-31)
  - Total: 5,777
  - Rank: 156th largest in Finland
  - Density: 0/km^{2} (0/sq mi)

Population by native language
  - Finnish: 96.9% (official)
  - Swedish: 0.3%
  - Others: 2.8%
- Time zone: UTC+02:00 (EET)
  - Summer (DST): UTC+03:00 (EEST)
- Website: www.tammela.fi

Tammela is a municipality of Finland. It is located in the Kanta-Häme region. The municipality has a population of 5,777 (31 December 2025) and it covers an area of 715.15 square kilometres (276.12 sq mi) of which 74.72 square kilometres (28.85 sq mi) is inland water (2018-01-01). The population density is 9 inhabitants per square kilometre (23/sq mi) (31 December 2025). The first mention of a village named Tammela was in documents from 1423.

Neighbouring municipalities are Forssa, Hämeenlinna, Jokioinen, Karkkila, Lohja, Loppi, Somero and Urjala. The municipality is unilingually Finnish.

Two national parks, Torronsuo National Park and Liesjärvi National Park, are located in Tammela municipality.

Tammela is also the name of a district in the city of Tampere.

== Villages ==
Hevoniemi, Hykkilä, Häiviä, Kallio, Kankainen, Kaukjärvi, Kaukola, Kuuslammi, Kytö, Letku, Liesjärvi, Lunkaa, Mustiala, Myllykylä, Ojainen, Pappila, Patamo, Pikonkorpi, Porras, Riihivalkama, Saari, Sukula, Susikas, Taljala, Talpia, Tammela, Teuro, Torajärvi, Torro.

== People born in Tammela ==
- Robert Wilhelm Lagerborg (1796 –1849)
- Toivo Alavirta (1890 – 1940)
- Rabbe Enckell (1903 – 1974)
- Eino Kujanpää (1904 – 1980)
- Antti Laaksonen (1972 –)
- Santeri Laine (1994 – 2017)
- Elias Seppänen (2003 –)
