= Roine (Finland) =

Lake in the country of Finland

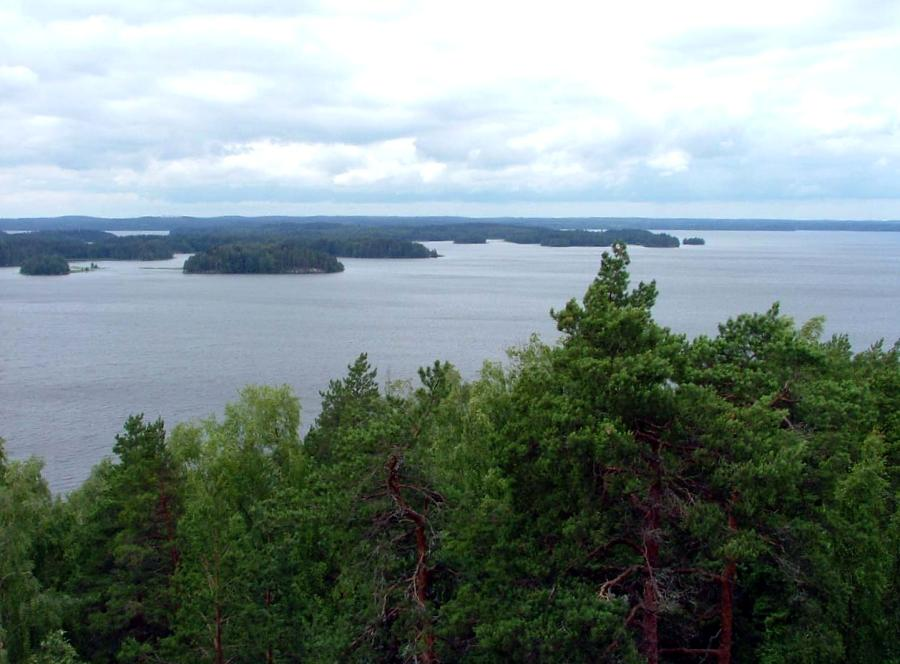

- Location within Finland
- Location: Kangasala, Pälkäne
- Coordinates: 61°24′N 024°03′E
- Lake type: Natural
- Catchment area: Kokemäenjoki
- Basin countries: Finland
- Surface area: 54.587 km^{2} (21.076 sq mi)
- Average depth: 7.36 m (24.1 ft)
- Max. depth: 38.4 m (126 ft)
- Water volume: 0.402 km^{3} (0.096 cu mi)
- Shore length^{1}: 195.21 km (121.30 mi)
- Surface elevation: 84.2 m (276 ft)
- Frozen: December–April
- Islands: Raronsalo, Vänninsalo, Papinsaari
- Settlements: Kangasala
- ^{1} Shore length is not a well-defined measure.

Roine is a medium-sized lake in Finland. The lake is located in the Pirkanmaa region, mostly in the municipality of Kangasala and for a lesser part in the municipality of Pälkäne.

The lake is part of Kokemäenjoki basin and a chain of lakes that consists of Längelmävesi, Vesijärvi, Roine, Pälkänevesi and Mallasvesi. This chain of lakes drains into Vanajavesi in Valkeakoski and from southeast another chain of lakes, consisting of the lakes Lummene, Vehkajärvi, Vesijako, Kuohijärvi, Kukkia, Iso-Roine, Hauhonselkä and Ilmoilanselkä joins into it. In Finnish the former chain of lakes is called Längelmäveden reitti and the latter Hauhon reitti as it runs through the former municipality of Hauho.

In Finnish culture Längelmävesi and Roine are well known as they are mentioned in the famous poem "En sommardag i Kangasala" (Finnish: Kesäpäivä Kangasalla) by Zachris Topelius and have thus become part of Finnish national landscape imagery.

== See also ==
- List of lakes in Finland
