= Pälkänevesi =

Lake in the country of Finland

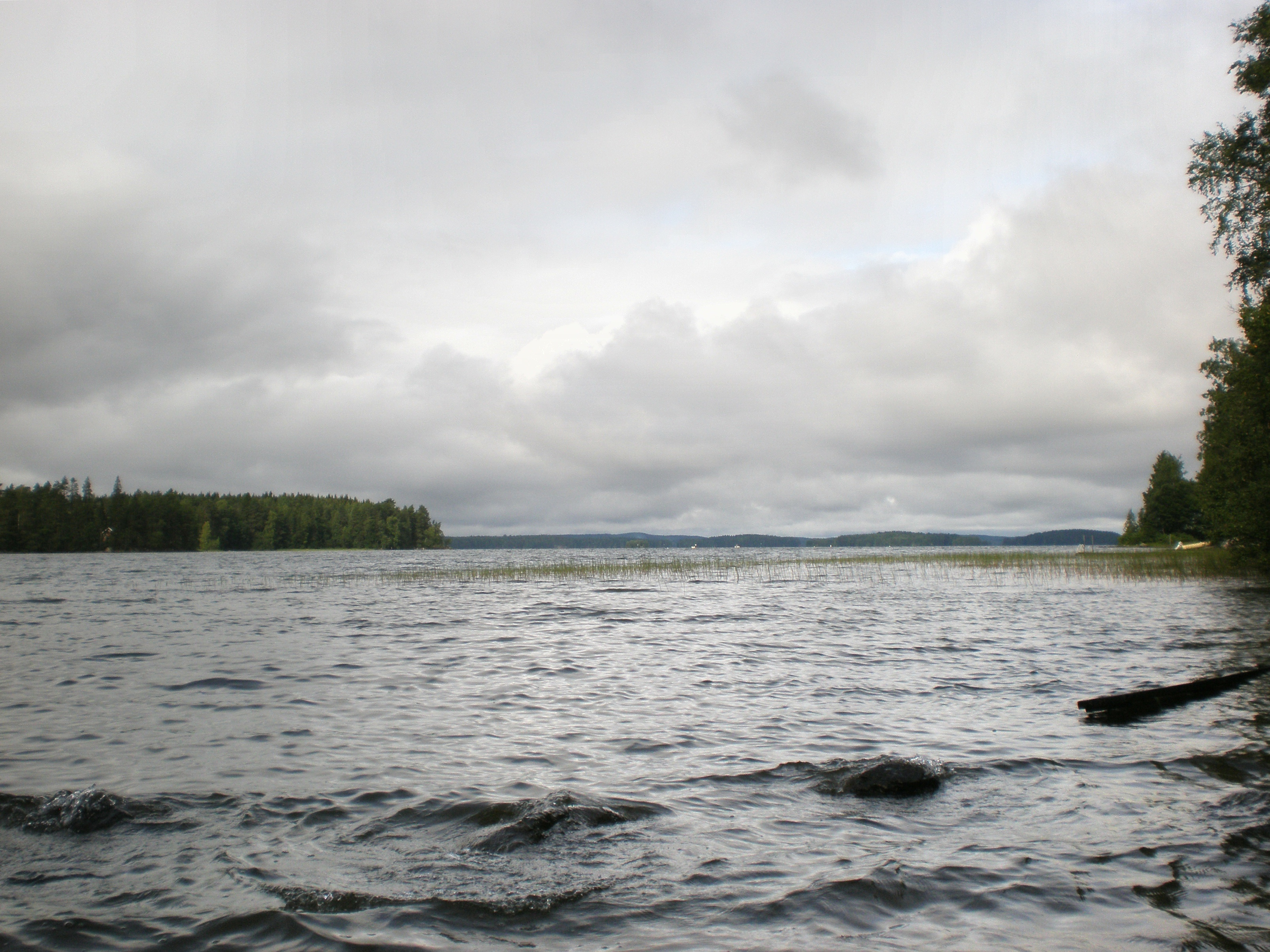
- Lake Pälkänevesi

- Location within Finland
- Location: Pälkäne
- Coordinates: 61°22′N 24°22′E
- Basin countries: Finland

Pälkänevesi is a lake in Finland. The lake is located in the municipality of Pälkäne in the Pirkanmaa region.

The lake is part of Kokemäenjoki basin and a chain of lakes that consists of Längelmävesi, Vesijärvi, Roine, Pälkänevesi and Mallasvesi. This chain of lakes drains into Vanajavesi in Valkeakoski and from southeast another chain of lakes, consisting of the lakes Lummene, Kuohijärvi, Kukkia, Iso-Roine, Hauhonselkä and Ilmoilanselkä joins into it. In Finnish the former chain of lakes is called Längelmäveden reitti and the latter Hauhon reitti as it runs through the former municipality of Hauho.

== See also ==
- List of lakes in Finland
