= Vesijärvi (Kangasala) =

Lake in the country of Finland

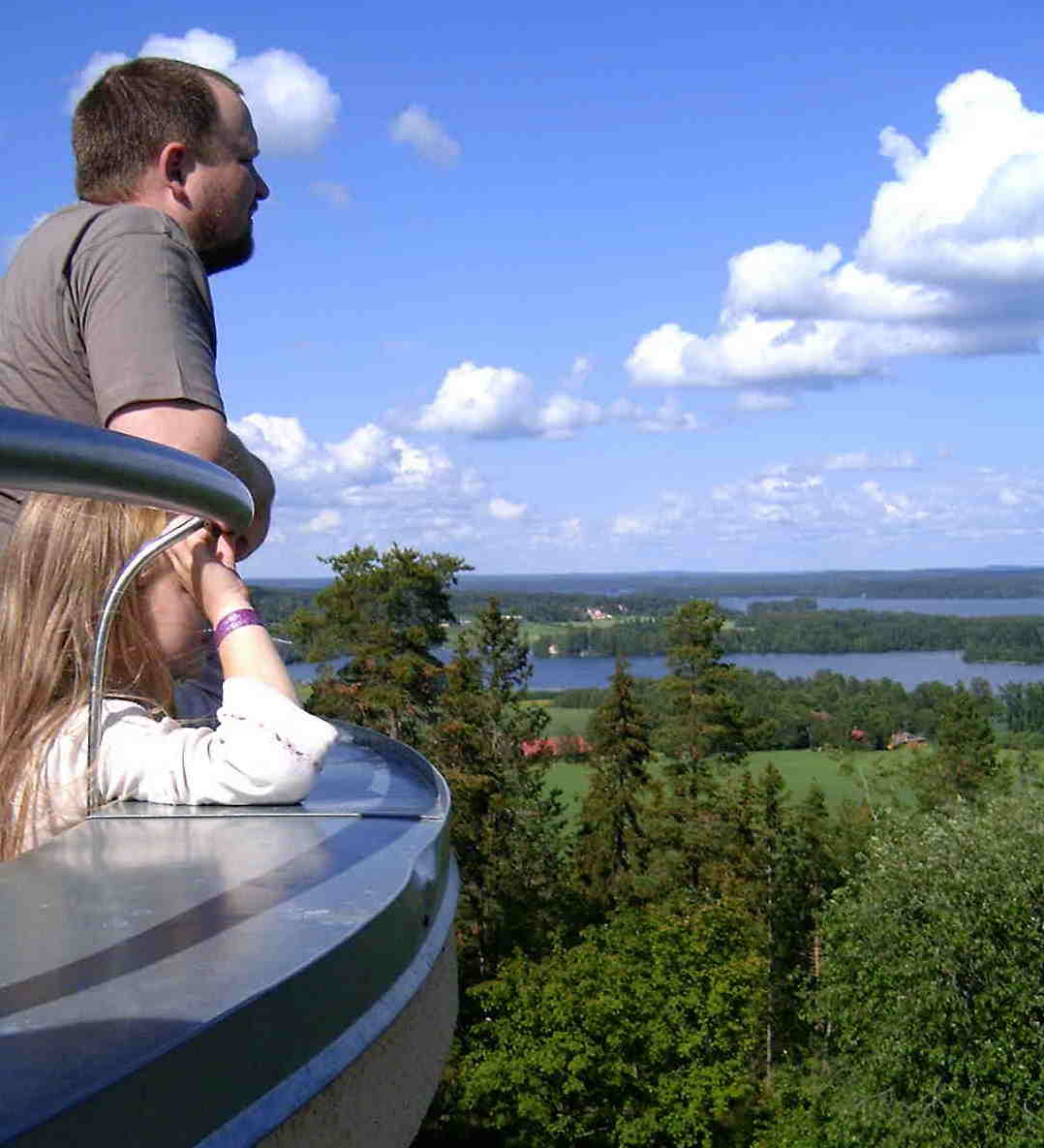

- Location within Finland
- Location: Kangasala, Orivesi
- Coordinates: 61°31′N 24°08′E
- Catchment area: Kokemäenjoki
- Basin countries: Finland
- Surface area: 39.477 km^{2} (15.242 sq mi)
- Average depth: 6.03 m (19.8 ft)
- Max. depth: 39 m (128 ft)
- Water volume: 0.238 km^{3} (193,000 acre⋅ft)
- Shore length^{1}: 171.45 km (106.53 mi)
- Surface elevation: 86.9 m (285 ft)
- Frozen: December–April
- ^{1} Shore length is not a well-defined measure.

Vesijärvi is a lake in Finland. It is located in the Pirkanmaa region and there mostly in the municipality of Kangasala and for a lesser part in the municipality of Orivesi.

The lake is part of Kokemäenjoki basin and a chain of lakes that consists of Längelmävesi, Vesijärvi, Roine, Pälkänevesi and Mallasvesi. This chain of lakes drains into Vanajavesi in Valkeakoski, and from southeast another chain of lakes, consisting of the lakes Lummene, Kuohijärvi, Kukkia, Iso-Roine, Hauhonselkä and Ilmoilanselkä joins into it. In Finnish the former chain of lakes is called Längelmäveden reitti and the latter Hauhon reitti as it runs through the former municipality of Hauho.

== See also ==
- List of lakes in Finland
