= Längelmävesi =

Lake in Pirkanmaa, Finland

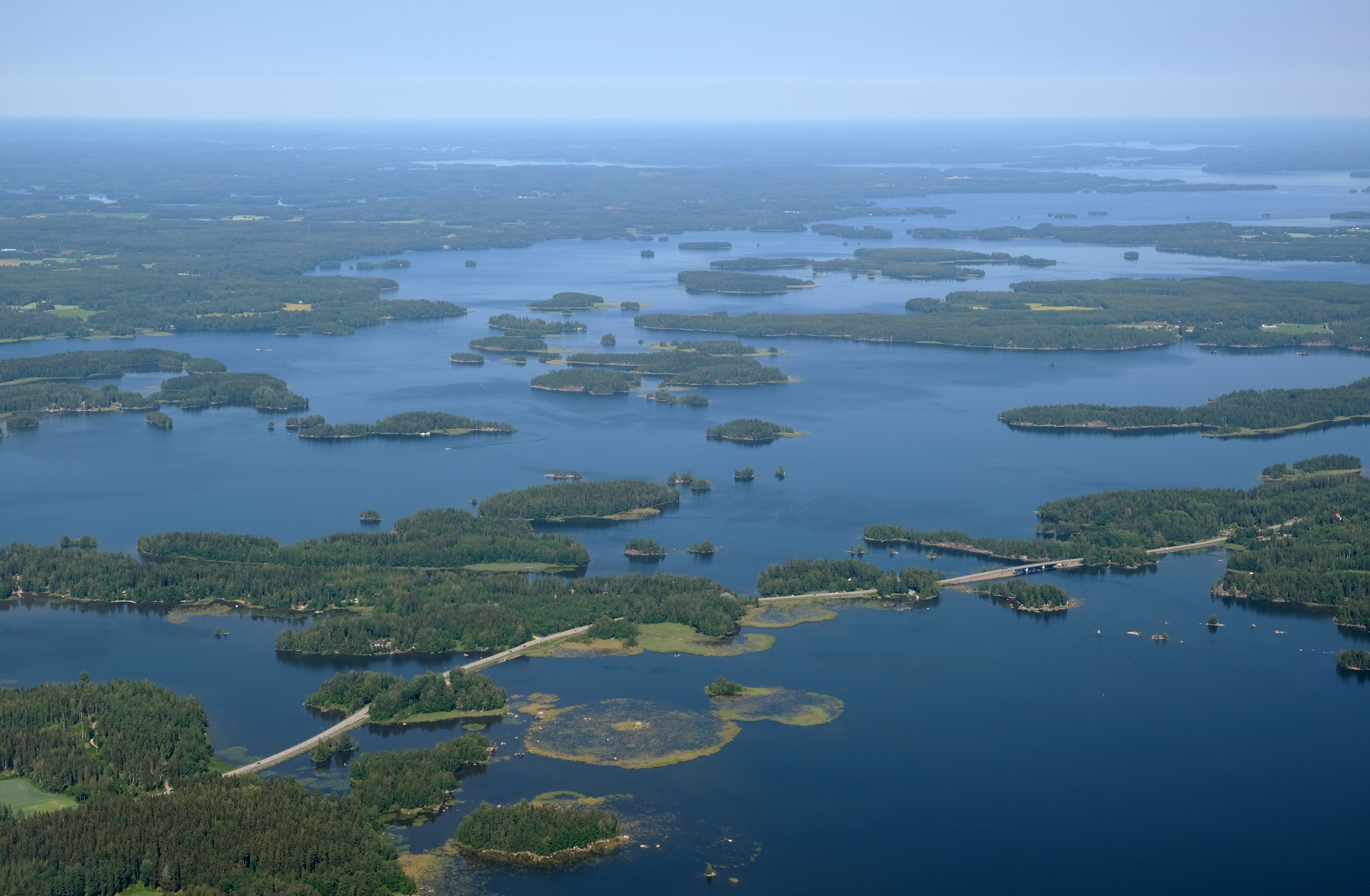
- Regional road 325 crossing Lake Längelmävesi near Sahalahti.

- Location within Finland
- Location: Kokemäenjoki drainage basin
- Coordinates: 61°34′N 024°25′E
- Basin countries: Finland
- Surface area: 133.04 km^{2} (51.37 sq mi)
- Average depth: 6.83 m (22.4 ft)
- Max. depth: 59.3 m (195 ft)
- Water volume: 0.909 km^{3} (737,000 acre⋅ft)
- Shore length^{1}: 496.95 km (308.79 mi)
- Surface elevation: 84.2 m (276 ft)
- Frozen: December–April
- Islands: Isosaari, Mäntysaari, Eräsalo, Mäkelänsaari
- Settlements: Längelmäki, Kangasala, Kuhmalahti, Orivesi, Jämsä, Sahalahti
- ^{1} Shore length is not a well-defined measure.

Längelmävesi (Finnish pronunciation: [ˈlæŋːelmæˌʋesi]) is a lake in southwestern Finland. The lake is located mostly in the Pirkanmaa region at an elevation of 84.2 metres (276 ft). Längelmävesi is within the municipalities of Jämsä (formerly Längelmäki), Kangasala (formerly Sahalahti), Kuhmalahti, and Orivesi.

== Geography ==
Längelmävesi lake is part of the Kokemäenjoki drainage basin (watershed). It is one of a chain of lakes (Längelmäveden reitti) that includes Längelmävesi, Vesijärvi, Roine, Pälkänevesi, and Mallasvesi lakes. This chain of lakes drains into the Vanajavesi in Valkeakoski.

From the southeast, another chain of lakes (Hauhon reitti), consisting of Lummene, Kuohijärvi, Kukkia, Iso-Roine, Hauhonselkä, and Ilmoilanselkä lakes joins into the Vanajavesi.

In Finnish, the former chain of lakes is called Längelmäveden reitti and the latter Hauhon reitti as it runs through the former municipality of Hauho.

== In culture ==
In Finnish culture, Längelmävesi and Roine lakes are well known — as they are mentioned in the famous poem "En sommardag i Kangasala" (Finnish: Kesäpäivä Kangasalla) by Zachris Topelius and have thus became part of Finnish national landscape imagery.

== See also ==
- List of lakes in Finland
