= Vanajavesi =

Lake in the country of Finland

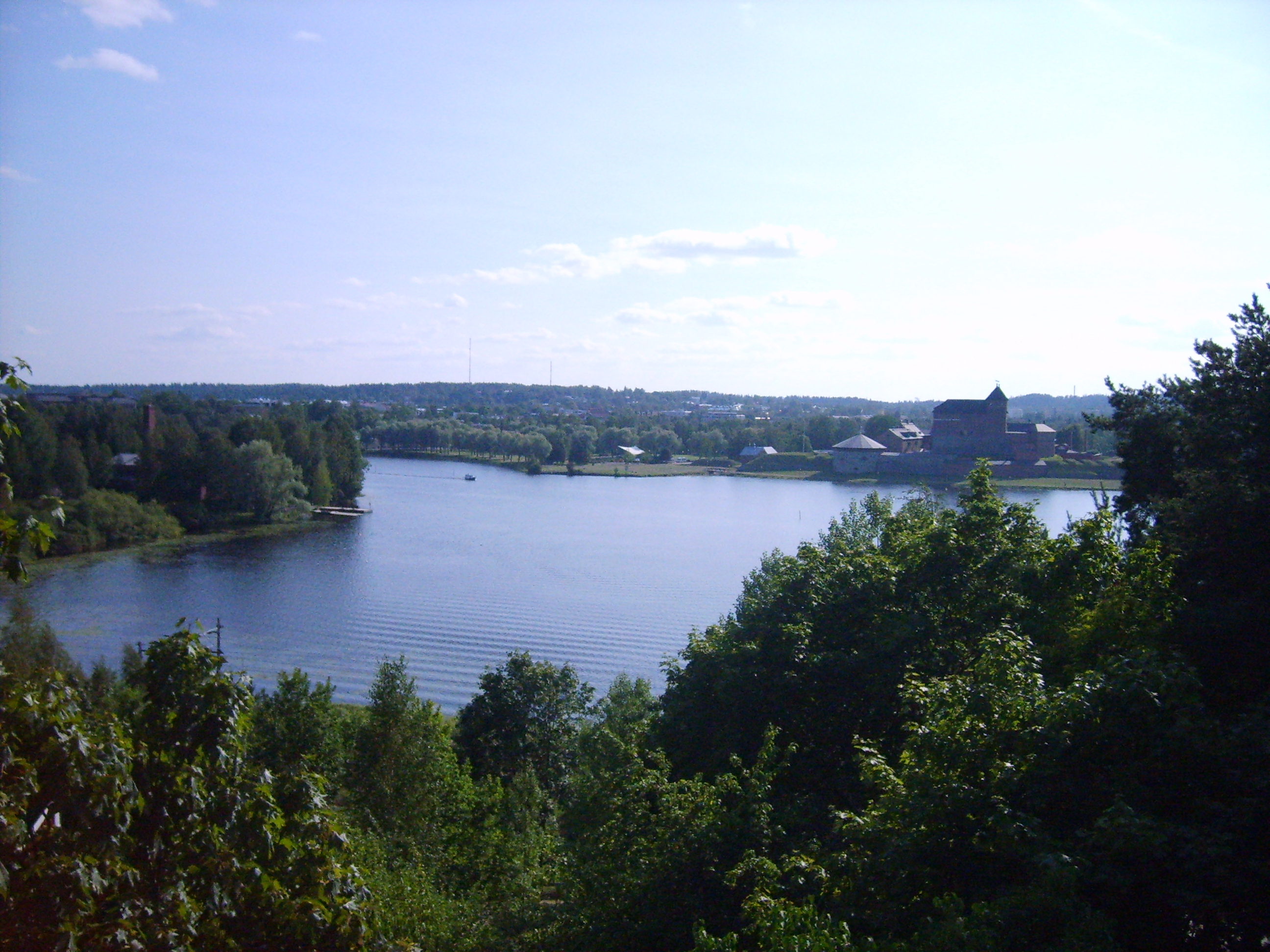

- Location within Finland
- Interactive map of Vanajavesi
- Coordinates: 61°10′N 24°15′E
- Primary outflows: Pyhäjärvi
- Basin countries: Finland
- Surface area: 149,758 km^{2} (57,822 sq mi)
- Max. depth: 23.89 m (78.4 ft)
- Water volume: 0.952 km^{3} (772,000 acre⋅ft)
- Shore length^{1}: 425.001 km (264.083 mi)
- Surface elevation: 79.4 m (260 ft)
- Frozen: December–April
- Islands: Retulansaari
- Settlements: Viiala, Sääksmäki, Valkeakoski
- ^{1} Shore length is not a well-defined measure.

Vanajavesi is a large lake in southern Finland, in the regions of Pirkanmaa and Kanta-Häme. It is part of the Kokemäenjoki basin. The lake gathers waters from a wide area in Pirkanmaa, Kanta-Häme and parts of the Päijät-Häme region.

== Settlements ==
The biggest city by the lake is Hämeenlinna in Kanta-Häme. Other cities and towns include Valkeakoski and Akaa (formerly Toijala) in the Pirkanmaa region. In addition to these, the municipalities by the lake include Lempäälä in the Pirkanmaa region and Hattula and Janakkala in the Kanta-Häme region.

== Watercourses ==
The lake is connected to Mallasvesi in the north, which itself is the joining point of two chains of lakes; The Längelmävesi route in the northeast, consisting of the lakes Längelmävesi, Vesijärvi, Roine, and Pälkänevesi. The other chain, the Hauho route, drains from the southeast and consists of the lakes Lummene, Vehkajärvi, Vesijako, Kuohijärvi, Kukkia, Iso-Roine, Vesanselkä and Ilmoilanselkä.

A third chain of lakes and rivers drain into Vanajavesi from the south, originating in Pääjärvi in the east and Loppijärvi in the west. This third chain is referred to as the Vanajavesi route.

Several lakes drain into Vanajavesi from the southeast, such as Rutajärvi. Vanajavesi itself drains into lake Pyhäjärvi through the Kuokkolankoski rapids, which are situated in Lempäälä, to the north.

== National landscape ==
Vanajavesi and its surroundings are the central area of the historical province of Häme (Tavastia) in Finland. It has been declared as one of the National landscapes of Finland as defined by the Finnish ministry of environment in 1992.

== See also ==
- List of lakes in Finland
