= Pääjärvi (Lammi) =

Lake in the country of Finland

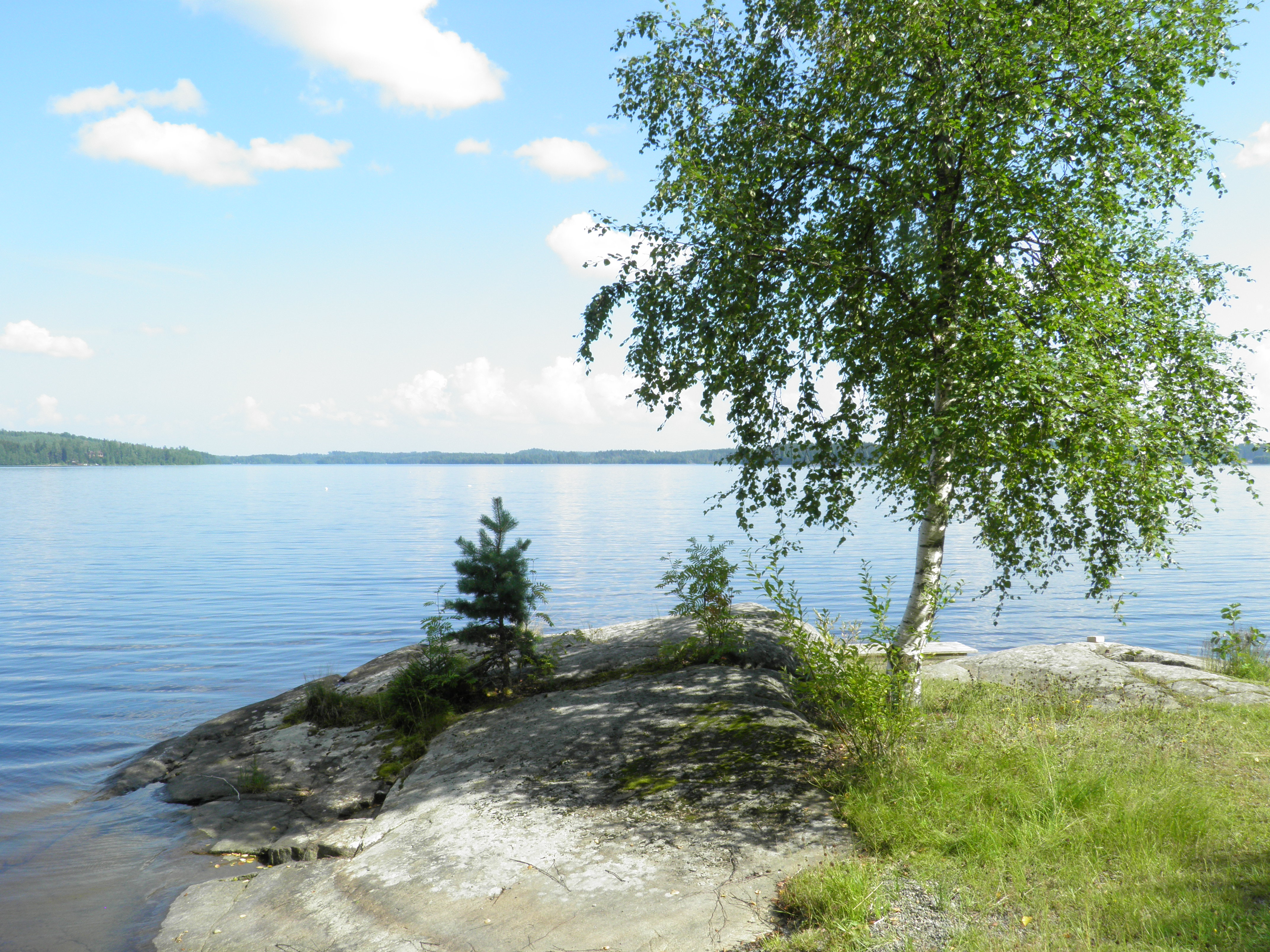

- Location within Finland
- Location: Hämeenlinna, Hollola
- Coordinates: 61.06°N 25.13°E
- Lake type: Natural
- Primary inflows: Putulanjoki river
- Primary outflows: Teuronjoki river
- Catchment area: Kokemäenjoki
- Basin countries: Finland
- Surface area: 13.444 km^{2} (5.191 sq mi)
- Average depth: 14.83 m (48.7 ft)
- Max. depth: 85 m (279 ft)
- Water volume: 0.199 km^{3} (0.048 cu mi)
- Shore length^{1}: 36.59 km (22.74 mi)
- Surface elevation: 102.9 m (338 ft)
- Frozen: December–April
- Islands: Etolansaaret, Lamminsaari, Kalliosaari
- ^{1} Shore length is not a well-defined measure.

Pääjärvi (Finnish: ['pæːˌjærʋi]) is a medium-sized lake in Finland. It is situated on the border between the city of Hämeenlinna in the Kanta-Häme region and the municipality of Hollola in the Päijät-Häme region.

The lake drains through the Teuronjoki river into the lake Mommilanjärvi and from there through the Puujoki River into Lake Kernaalanjärvi and from there through the Hiidenjoki River into Lake Vanajavesi and it is thus a part of the Kokemäenjoki basin that drains the western third of the Finnish Lakeland.

== See also ==
- List of lakes in Finland
