= Vehkajärvi =

Lake in Finland

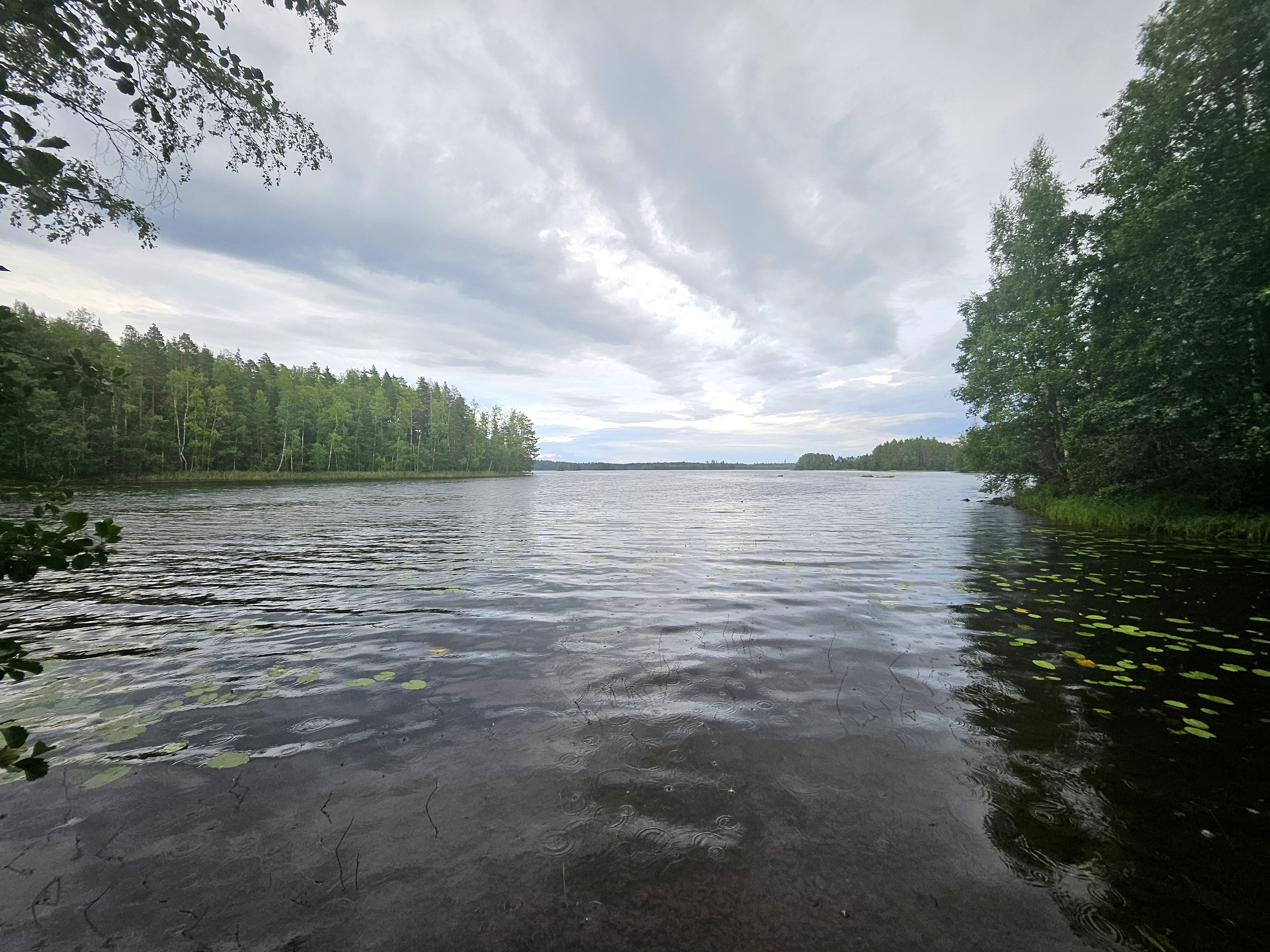

- Location within Finland
- Location: Kangasala, Pälkäne, Padasjoki, Kuhmoinen
- Coordinates: 61°29′00″N 24°52′30″E
- Catchment area: Kokemäenjoki, partly Kymijoki
- Basin countries: Finland
- Surface area: 26.083 km^{2} (10.071 sq mi)
- Average depth: 5.53 m (18.1 ft)
- Max. depth: 19.64 m (64.4 ft)
- Water volume: 0.144 km^{3} (117,000 acre⋅ft)
- Shore length^{1}: 118.89 km (73.87 mi)
- Surface elevation: 110.5 m (363 ft)
- Frozen: December–April
- Islands: Iso Vehkasalo, Iso Salonsaari, Niittysaari
- Settlements: Kuhmalahti
- ^{1} Shore length is not a well-defined measure.

Vehkajärvi is a medium-sized lake in Finland. It is located at the border of Pirkanmaa, Päijät-Häme and Central Finland regions in the Finnish Lakeland. The lake is mostly in the municipality of Kangasala, with smaller parts in the municipalities of Pälkäne, Padasjoki and Kuhmoinen.

The lake is a part of a lake system that consists of Vehkajärvi, Lummene and Vesijako. Of these three both Lummene and Vesijako are bifurcation lakes and Vehkajärvi is situated between them so that waters from Lummene flow in two directions: eastwards into lake Päijänne and westwards into Vehkajärvi from which waters flow into lake Vesijako. From lake Vesijako there are again two outflows: one eastwards into lake Päijänne, part of the Kymijoki basin that drains into the Gulf of Finland, and another outflow westwards into lake Kuohijärvi from which waters flow through a chain of lakes into Vanajavesi and finally into the Gulf of Bothnia through the Kokemäenjoki.

In Finland there are 27 lakes that are called Vehkajärvi. This is the biggest of them.

== See also ==
- List of lakes in Finland
