= Kuohijärvi =

Lake in the country of Finland

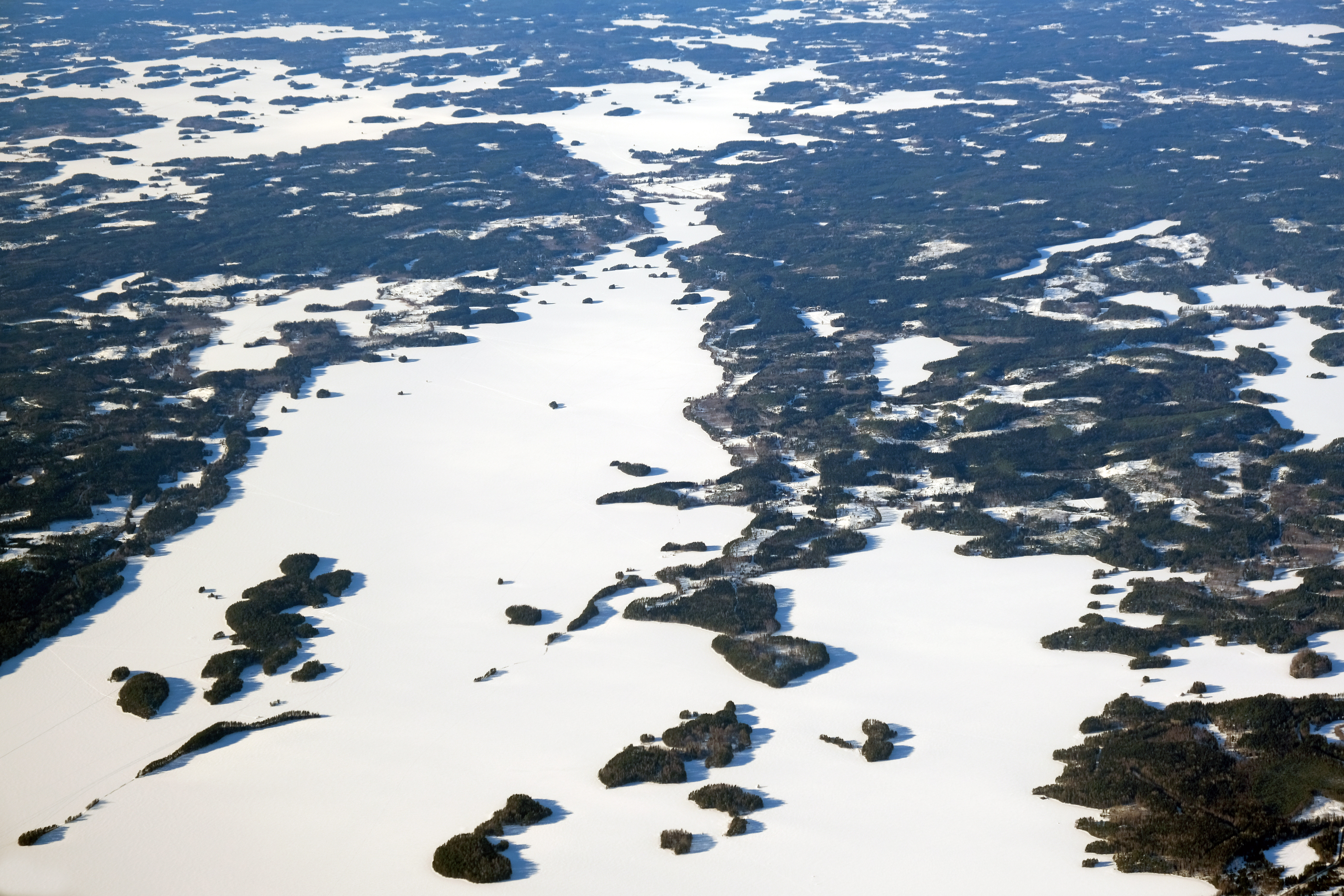
- Kuohijärvi in an aerial photograph in March 2022.

- Location within Finland
- Location: Hämeenlinna, Pälkäne
- Coordinates: 61°14′00″N 24°53′00″E
- Basin countries: Finland
- Surface area: 35 km^{2} (14 sq mi)
- Shore length^{1}: 116 km (72 mi)
- ^{1} Shore length is not a well-defined measure.

Kuohijärvi is a lake in Finland. It is part of a chain of lakes that begins from the lakes Lummene and Vesijako at the drainage divide between the Kokemäenjoki and Kymijoki basins, flows westwards from there and drains into lake Mallasvesi through the lakes Kuohijärvi, Kukkia, Iso-Roine, Hauhonselkä and Ilmoilanselkä. From Mallasvesi, the waters flow through Vanajavesi and Pyhäjärvi towards the west, and ultimately to the Gulf of Bothnia. Kuohijärvi lake is part of the Kokemäenjoki basin and is located for the most part in the area of the city of Hämeenlinna (in the former municipality of Hauho) in the Kanta-Häme region and for a smaller part in the municipality of Pälkäne (in the area of the former municipality of Luopioinen) in the Pirkanmaa region.

== See also ==
- List of lakes in Finland
