= Tammerfors Aktuellt =

Swedish language local newspaper in Finland

Tammerfors Aktuellt, abbreviation TA, is a local Swedish newspaper published in Tampere, Finland. It started publishing in 1973 as the successor of Tammerfors Aftonblad, which started publishing in 1882. It is the only regular Swedish publication in the area of Tampere. The newspaper is published by Svenska Sällskapsklubben i Tammerfors r.f., an organisation that aims to preserve and develop the Swedish language in the area of Tampere. The paper is also an important bulletin forum for the Swedish-speaking population in Tampere and Pirkanmaa. The paper is politically nonaligned and nonprofit.

The paper is published biweekly and its circulation is around 400.
