= Vesijako =

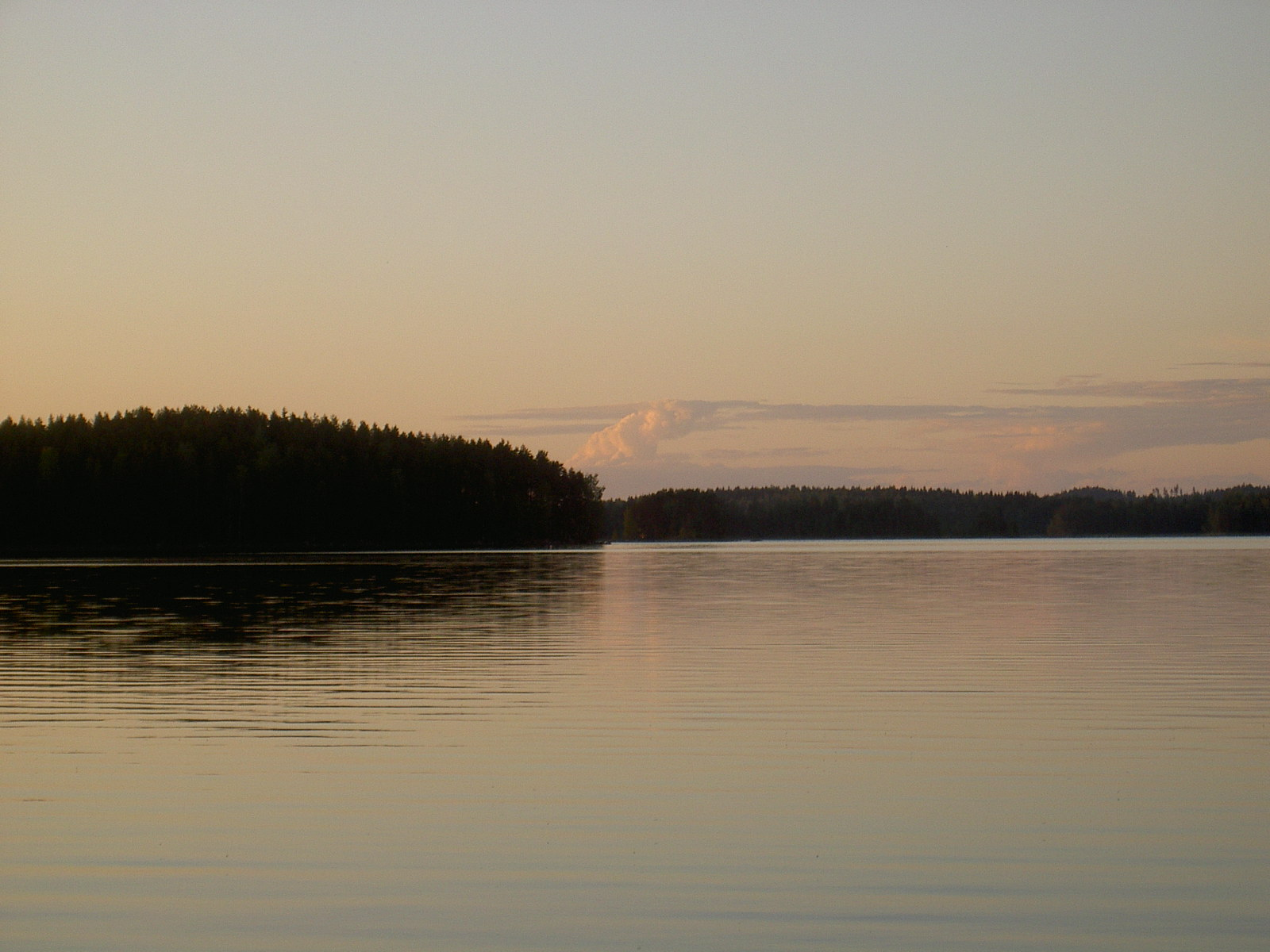

- Location within Finland
- Location: Padasjoki
- Coordinates: 61°23′N 025°00′E
- Type: Lake
- Catchment area: Kymijoki, Kokemäenjoki
- Basin countries: Finland
- Surface area: 16.5 km^{2} (6.4 sq mi)
- Average depth: 7.16 m (23.5 ft)
- Max. depth: 37 m (121 ft)
- Water volume: 0.118 km^{3} (96,000 acre⋅ft)
- Shore length^{1}: 80.4 km (50.0 mi)
- Surface elevation: 108.4 m (356 ft)
- Frozen: December–April
- Islands: Isosaari
- ^{1} Shore length is not a well-defined measure.

Vesijako (also Vesijakaa) is a lake in Finland. It is situated in Padasjoki in the region of Päijänne Tavastia.

The lake is famous in Finland as a bifurcation lake (the name Vesijako actually means "drainage divide"), together with the nearby Lummene that is somewhat less known, and from which waters flow eastwards into lake Päijänne and westwards through the lake Vehkajärvi into lake Vesijako.

Vesijako in turn also has two outflows. One is eastwards to the lake Päijänne, which is a part of Kymijoki basin and drains to the Gulf of Finland. The other outflow is into a chain of lakes that is a part of the Kokemäenjoki basin and consists of the lakes Kuohijärvi, Kukkia, Iso-Roine, Hauhonselkä and Ilmoilanselkä and ends into lake Mallasvesi, from which the waters flow through Vanajavesi and Pyhäjärvi towards Kokemäenjoki in the west, and ultimately to the Gulf of Bothnia.

== See also ==
- List of lakes in Finland
