= Sointula, Finland =

Valkeakoski Subdivision in Pirkanmaa, Finland

Coordinates: 61°16′19.23″N 24°02′55.27″E

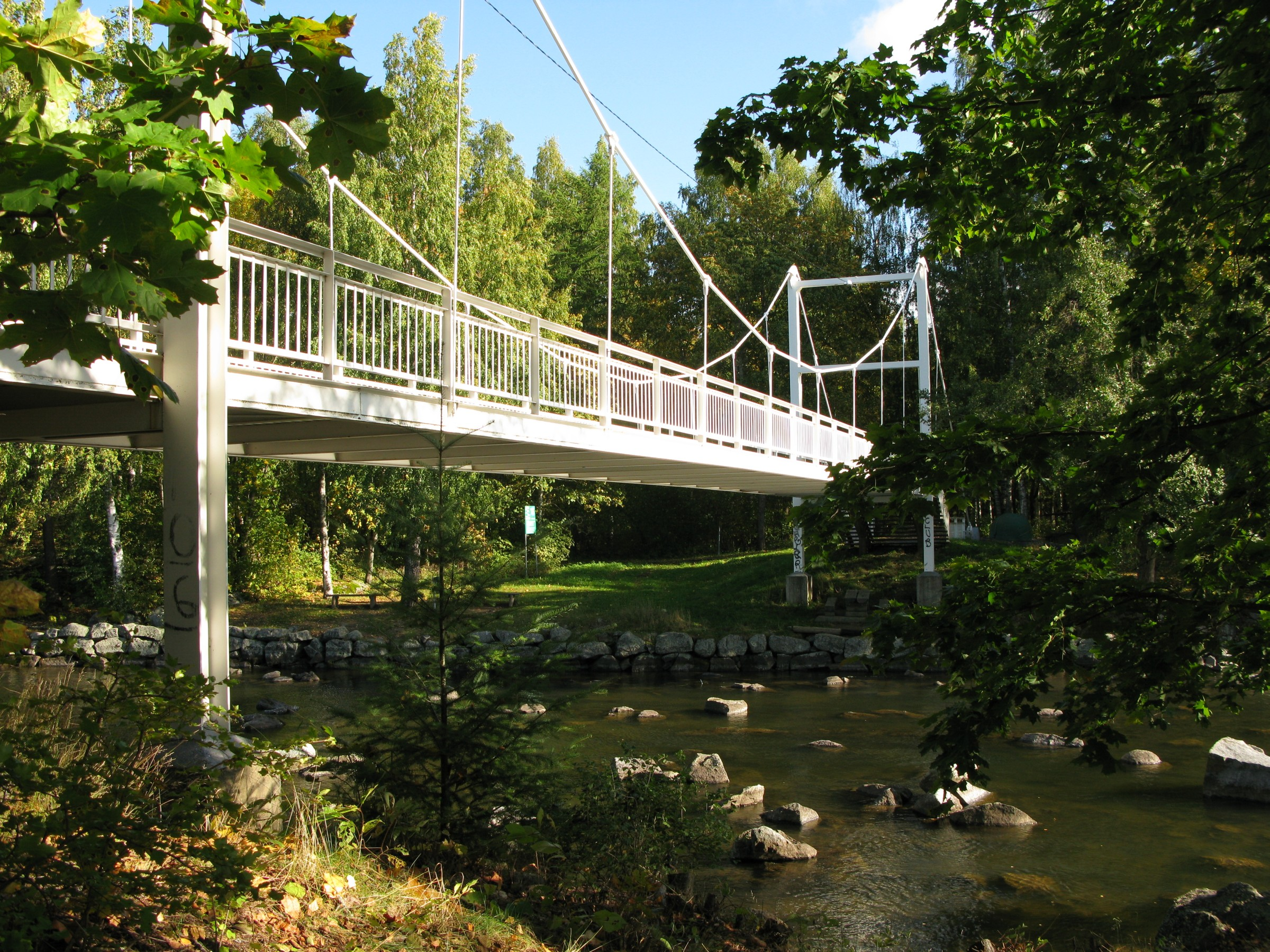
The Apianlahti Bridge in Sointula

Sointula is a district in the eastern part of the town of Valkeakoski, Finland. Sointula has an area of a shopping center and day care center surrounded by the Innalantie and Sointulantie streets. The "loop of the suspension bridges" (Riippusiltojen lenkki) passes through Sointula. Suspension bridges also belong to Sointula.

Sointula is a bit isolated from the rest of the town. It is located when starting from Valkeakoski along the Pälkäneentie road to Pälkäne. Sointula is bounded on the south by the Lumikorpi's industrial area and on the east, west and north by Lake Mallasvesi. Apia's campsite is located next to Sointula, and the Kirjaslampi pond to its northwest. Kirjaslampi also has the Kirjaslampi Stage, where dances are held in summer.
