= Koljonselkä =

Koljonselkä may refer to:

- Koljonselkä, a lake basin in lake Längelmävesi, Finland
- Koljonselkä, a lake basin in lake Näsijärvi, Finland
