= Sointula (disambiguation) =

Sointula is a village on Malcolm Island in British Columbia, Canada

Sointula may also refer to:

- Jani Sointula (born c. 1975), a Finnish professional poker player
- Sointula, Finland, a district in the town of Valkeakoski, Finland
- Sointula, a 1924 play by Arvid Järnefelt
- Sointula, a 2004 novel by Bill Gaston
