= Sinervä =

Body of water in Finland

- View from the northern shore
- Interactive map of Sinervä
- Location: Multia
- Coordinates: 62°24′N 24°49′E
- Type: Lake
- Primary inflows: Pietilänjoki
- Primary outflows: Hallinsalmi
- Catchment area: Kokemäenjoki
- Basin countries: Finland
- Surface area: 6.71 km^{2} (2.59 sq mi)
- Average depth: 7.96 m (26.1 ft)
- Max. depth: 38 m (125 ft)
- Water volume: 0.0534 km^{3} (43,300 acre⋅ft)
- Shore length^{1}: 38.87 km (24.15 mi)
- Surface elevation: 139.4 m (457 ft)
- Frozen: December–April
- Islands: Sikosaari, Nevalahdensaari
- Settlements: Multia
- ^{1} Shore length is not a well-defined measure.

Sinervä is a rather small lake in Central Finland, in Multia municipality. It belongs to Kokemäenjoki main catchment area.

== See also ==
- List of lakes in Finland
