= Ilmoilanselkä =

River in the country of Finland

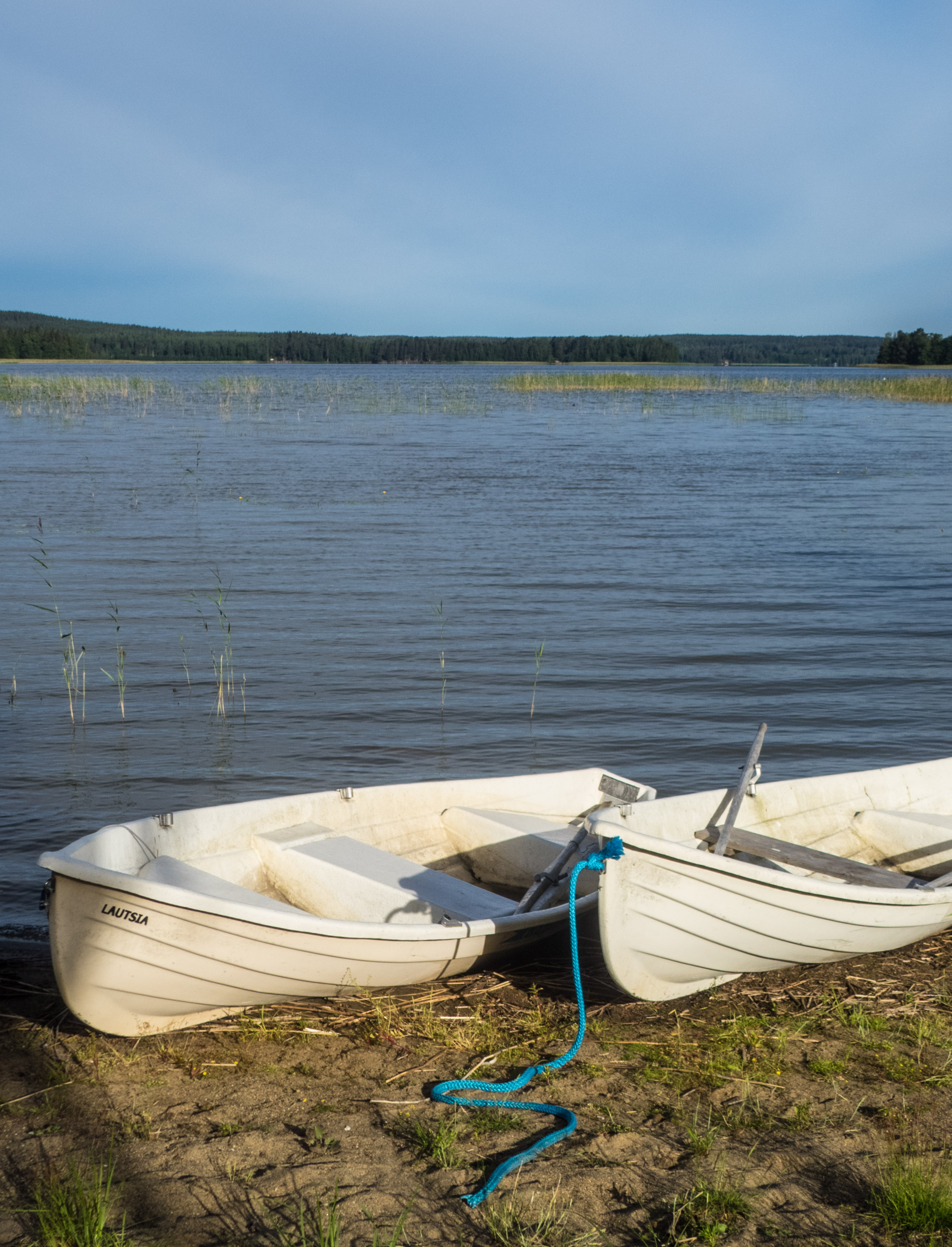
- Ilmoilanselkä lake in Hauho, eastern shore

- Location within Finland
- Location: Hämeenlinna, Pälkäne
- Coordinates: 61°13′N 24°25′E
- Basin countries: Finland
- Surface area: 14.754 km^{2} (5.697 sq mi)
- Average depth: 4.42 m (14.5 ft)
- Max. depth: 23 m (75 ft)
- Water volume: 0.0651 km^{3} (52,800 acre⋅ft)
- Shore length^{1}: 52.19 km (32.43 mi)
- Surface elevation: 84.2 m (276 ft)
- Frozen: December–April
- Islands: Salpasalo, Hevossaari
- ^{1} Shore length is not a well-defined measure.

Ilmoilanselkä is a lake in Finland. It is part of a chain of lakes that begins from the lakes Lummene and Vesijako at the drainage divide between the Kokemäenjoki and Kymijoki basins, flows westwards from there through the lakes Kuohijärvi, Kukkia, Iso-Roine, Hauhonselkä and Ilmoilanselkä and drains into lake Mallasvesi. From there the waters flow through Vanajavesi and Pyhäjärvi towards the Kokemäenjoki in the west, and ultimately to the Gulf of Bothnia. Ilmoilanselkä is part of the Kokemäenjoki basin and is located for the most part in the area of the city of Hämeenlinna (in the former municipality of Hauho) in the Kanta-Häme region and for a smaller part in the municipality of Pälkäne in the Pirkanmaa region.

== See also ==
- List of lakes in Finland
