= Kanta-Häme =

Region of Finland

Kanta-Häme Egentliga Tavastland Tavastia Proper
- Region
- Region of Kanta-Häme; Kanta-Hämeen maakunta (Finnish); Landskapet Egentliga Tavastland (Swedish)
- Flag Coat of arms

- Kanta-Häme on a map of Finland
- Coordinates: 60°50′N 24°15′E
- Country: Finland
- Historical province: Tavastia
- Capital: Hämeenlinna
- Other towns: Forssa and Riihimäki

Government
  - Regional Mayor: Toni K. Laine

Area
  - Total: 5,706.39 km^{2} (2,203.25 sq mi)

Population (2019)
  - Total: 170,925
  - Density: 29.9533/km^{2} (77.5786/sq mi)

GDP
  - Total: €5.494 billion (2015)
  - Per capita: €31,389 (2015)
- ISO 3166 code: FI-06
- NUTS: 184
- Regional animal: Eurasian lynx (Lynx lynx)
- Regional bird: Osprey (Pandion haliaetus)
- Regional fish: Carp bream (Abramis brama)
- Regional flower: Pasqueflower (Pulsatilla patens)
- Regional stone: Graphic feldspar
- Regional lake: Lake Vanajavesi
- Website: hameenliitto.fi

Kanta-Häme (Finnish pronunciation: [ˈkɑn̪t̪ɑˌhæme̞(ʔ)]; Swedish: Egentliga Tavastland), sometimes referred to as Tavastia Proper, is a region (Finnish: maakunta, Swedish: landskap) of Finland. It borders the regions of Southwest Finland, Pirkanmaa, Päijät-Häme, and Uusimaa. Before the official adoption of the name Kanta-Häme in 1998, the region was commonly known as Häme.

Hämeenlinna is the largest urban area in the region. There are two other municipalities that have city status: Riihimäki and Forssa.

== Historical provinces ==
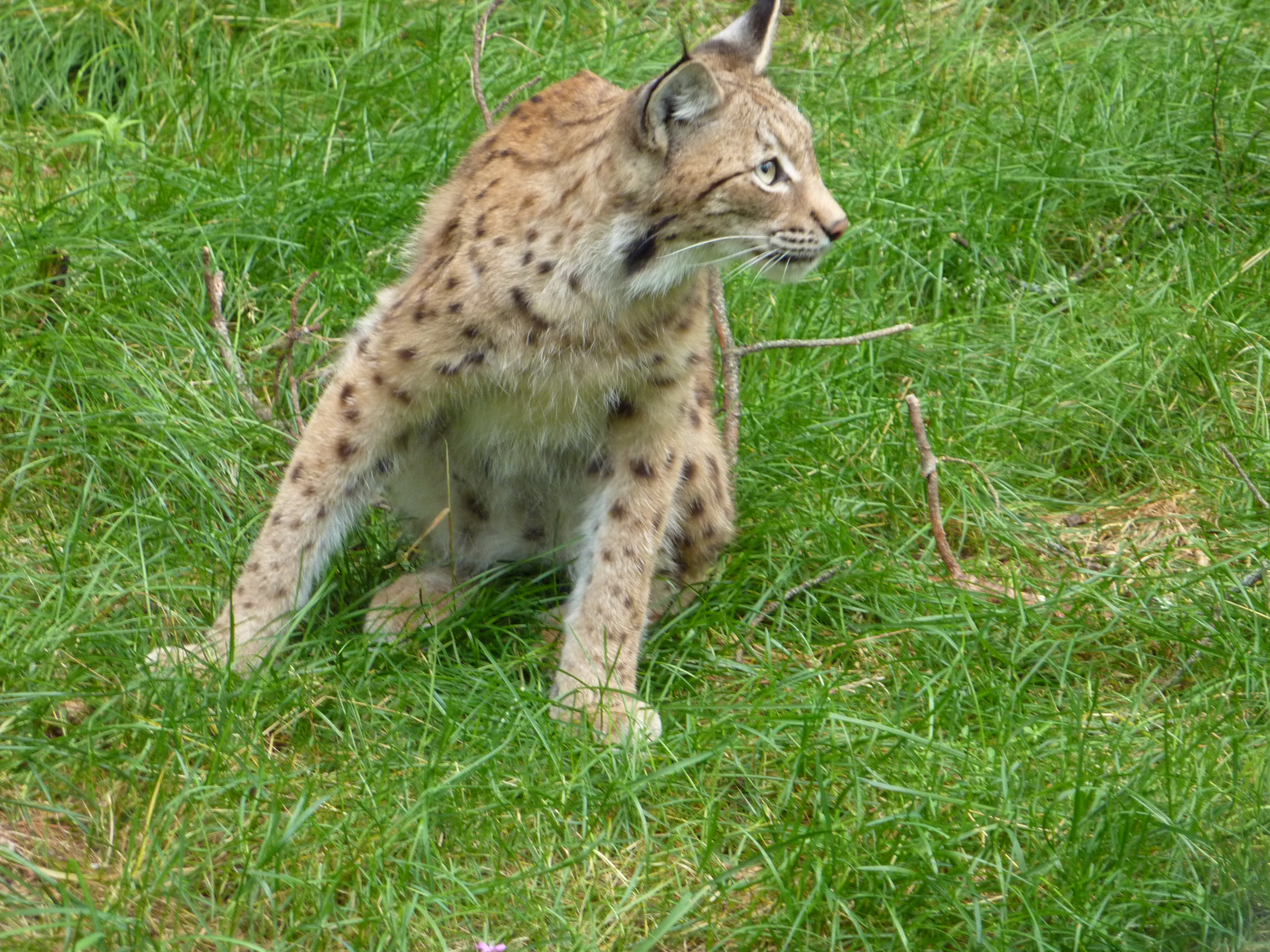
The Eurasian lynx (Lynx lynx) is a regional animal of Kanta-Häme.

== Heraldry ==
Kanta-Häme uses the arms of the old historical province Tavastia.

== Geography ==
The landscape of Kanta-Häme has many of the characteristics of Finnish Lakeland. The province belongs almost entirely to the Kokemäenjoki water basin. The largest lake is Vanajavesi, which receives water from Lammi, Hausjärvi, Loppi and Janakkala from the southeast. The north-eastern part of the province belongs to the so-called Hauho route, whose waters flow into Vanajavesi through Pälkäne and Valkeakoski. In addition to Vanajavesi, the largest lakes in this region are Kuohijärvi, Pyhäjärvi, Iso-Roine, Hauhonselkä, Ilmoilanselkä and Lehijärvi in Hattula. In the southwestern part of the province, Loimijoki rises in the Tammela and Forssa areas and flows through Loimaa and Huittinen into Kokemäenjoki. The largest lake in the southwestern part of Häme is Pyhäjärvi in Tammela, where the Loimijoki originates. In Riihimäki and the southern part of Lope, the headwaters of Vantaanjoki flow south into the Gulf of Finland.

Torronsuo and Liesjärvi National Parks are located in Kanta-Häme, both in the southwest of the province in Tammela.

== Culture ==
Kanta-Häme region is well known for the preserved tradition of brewing sahti.

== Municipalities ==
The region of Kanta-Häme consists of three sub-regions and 11 municipalities, three of which have city status (marked in bold).

=== Municipalities on the map ===
Cities and municipalities of Kanta-Häme.

=== Sub-regions ===
Forssa sub-region

- **Forssa**
- Humppila
- Jokioinen (Jockis)
- Tammela
- Ypäjä

Hämeenlinna sub-region

- Hattula
- **Hämeenlinna** (Tavastehus)
- Janakkala

Riihimäki sub-region

- Hausjärvi
- Loppi
- **Riihimäki**

=== Municipalities listed ===
| Coat of arms | Municipality | Population | Land area (km^{2}) | Density (/km^{2}) | Finnish speakers | Swedish speakers | Other speakers |
|---|---|---|---|---|---|---|---|
| Coat of arms of Forssa | Forssa | 16,307 | 249 | 66 | 90 % | 0.3 % | 10 % |
| Coat of arms of Hattula | Hattula | 9,346 | 358 | 26 | 97 % | 0.4 % | 3 % |
| Coat of arms of Hausjärvi | Hausjärvi | 7,862 | 389 | 20 | 96 % | 0.4 % | 4 % |
| Coat of arms of Humppila | Humppila | 2,074 | 148 | 14 | 97 % | 0 % | 3 % |
| Coat of arms of Hämeenlinna | Hämeenlinna | 68,614 | 1,785 | 38 | 91 % | 0.4 % | 8 % |
| Coat of arms of Janakkala | Janakkala | 15,867 | 547 | 29 | 95 % | 0.4 % | 4 % |
| Coat of arms of Jokioinen | Jokioinen | 4,795 | 180 | 27 | 96 % | 0.4 % | 4 % |
| Coat of arms of Loppi | Loppi | 7,574 | 598 | 13 | 95 % | 0.5 % | 4 % |
| Coat of arms of Riihimäki | Riihimäki | 28,555 | 121 | 236 | 91 % | 0.4 % | 8 % |
| Coat of arms of Tammela | Tammela | 5,777 | 641 | 9 | 97 % | 0.3 % | 3 % |
| Coat of arms of Ypäjä | Ypäjä | 2,186 | 183 | 12 | 97 % | 0 % | 3 % |
| | Total | 168,957 | 5,199 | 32.5 | 93 % | 0.4 % | 7 % |

== Demographics ==
Population size 1990–2025
| Year | Population |
|---|---|
| 1990 | 162,248 |
| 1995 | 164,937 |
| 2000 | 165,307 |
| 2005 | 168,381 |
| 2010 | 174,555 |
| 2015 | 174,710 |
| 2020 | 170,577 |
| 2025 | 168,957 |

== Politics ==
For parliamentary elections, Kanta-Häme, together with the region of Päijät-Häme, is part of the Häme constituency. As of 2023, the constituency elects 14 of the 200 members of the Parliament of Finland.
