= Kukkia =

Lake in Pälkäne, Finland

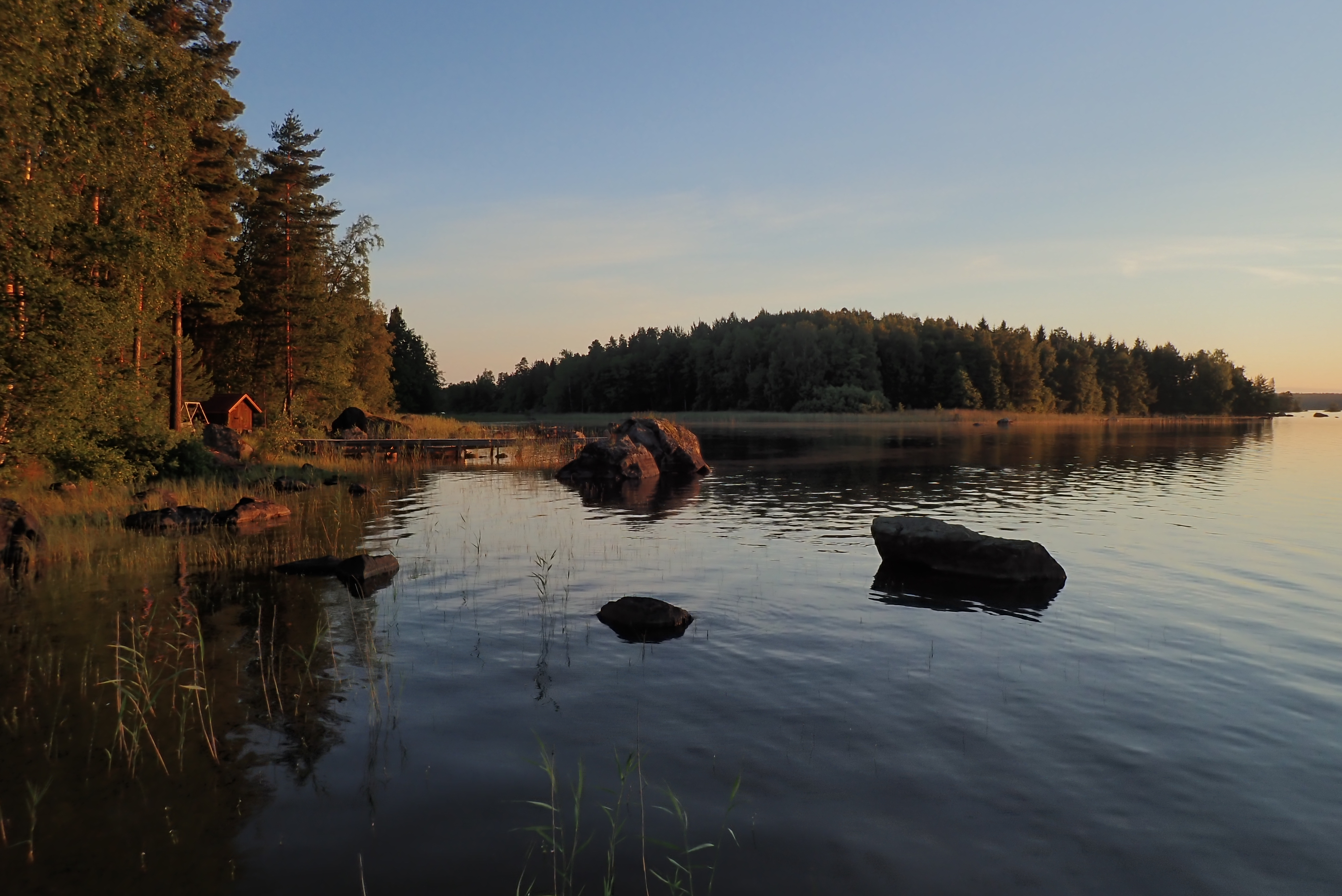

- Location within Finland
- Location: Pälkäne, Hämeenlinna
- Coordinates: 61°20′N 24°42′E
- Type: Lake
- Catchment area: Kokemäenjoki
- Basin countries: Finland
- Surface area: 43.889 km^{2} (16.946 sq mi)
- Average depth: 5.23 m (17.2 ft)
- Max. depth: 35.62 m (116.9 ft)
- Water volume: 0.23 km^{3} (190,000 acre⋅ft)
- Shore length^{1}: 283.97 km (176.45 mi)
- Surface elevation: 86.6 m (284 ft)
- Frozen: December–April
- Islands: Evinsalo
- Settlements: Luopioinen
- ^{1} Shore length is not a well-defined measure.

Kukkia is a medium-sized lake in Finland. It is a part of a chain of lakes that begins from the lakes Lummene, Vehkajärvi and Vesijako at the drainage divide between the Kokemäenjoki and Kymijoki basins and flows westwards from there through the Lake Kuohijärvi into Lake Kukkia. From Kukkia the chain of lakes drains into lake Mallasvesi through the lakes Iso-Roine, Hauhonselkä and Ilmoilanselkä, and the waters ultimately flow to the Gulf of Bothnia. The lake is part of the Kokemäenjoki basin and is located for the main part in the municipality of Pälkäne in the Pirkanmaa region and for a smaller part in the area of the city of Hämeenlinna in the Kanta-Häme region.

== See also ==
- List of lakes in Finland
