= Hauhonselkä =

River in the country of Finland

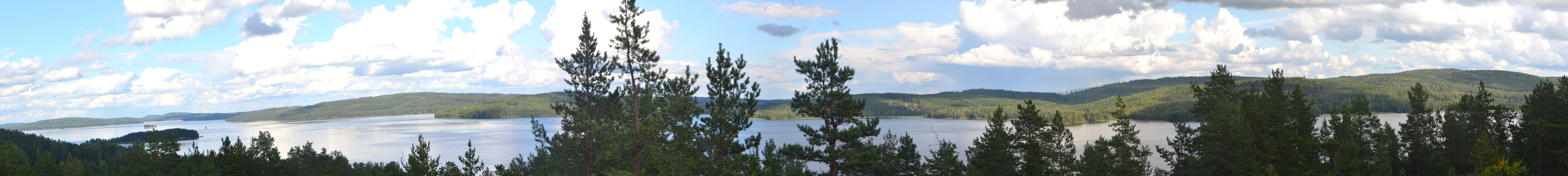
- Hauhonselkä of Päijänne from Paljaspää, Jyväskylä, Finland

- Location within Finland
- Location: Hämeenlinna
- Coordinates: 61°10′N 24°30′E
- Basin countries: Finland
- Surface area: 22 km^{2} (8.5 sq mi)
- Shore length^{1}: 63 km (39 mi)
- ^{1} Shore length is not a well-defined measure.

Hauhonselkä is a lake in Finland. It is part of a chain of lakes that begins from the lakes Lummene and Vesijako at the drainage divide between the Kokemäenjoki and Kymijoki basins and flows westwards from there through the lakes Kuohijärvi, Kukkia, Iso-Roine, Hauhonselkä and Ilmoilanselkä and ends into lake Mallasvesi. From Mallasvesi, the waters flow through Vanajavesi and Pyhäjärvi towards Kokemäenjoki in the west, and ultimately to the Gulf of Bothnia.

Hauhonselkä lake is located in the city of Hämeenlinna in the area of the former municipality of Hauho in the Kanta-Häme region and is a part of the Kokemäenjoki basin.

== See also ==
- List of lakes in Finland
