= Lummene =

- Location within Finland
- Location: Kuhmoinen
- Coordinates: 61°29′N 25°03′E
- Type: Lake
- Catchment area: Kymijoki, Kokemäenjoki
- Basin countries: Finland
- Surface area: 17.965 km^{2} (6.936 sq mi)
- Average depth: 4.18 m (13.7 ft)
- Max. depth: 30.8 m (101 ft)
- Water volume: 0.0751 km^{3} (60,900 acre⋅ft)
- Shore length^{1}: 118.49 km (73.63 mi)
- Surface elevation: 114.1 m (374 ft)
- Frozen: December–April
- Islands: Salonsaari
- Settlements: Kuhmoinen
- References: Järviwiki Web Service
- ^{1} Shore length is not a well-defined measure.

Lummene (also Lummenne) is a lake in Finland in the municipality of Kuhmoinen in the Central Finland region.

The lake is a bifurcation lake. One outflow from it is eastwards into the lake Päijänne, which is a part of Kymijoki basin and drains into the Gulf of Finland. Other outflow is into lake Vehkajärvi and from there into lake Vesijako that also is a bifurcation lake. From lake Vesijako there are two outflows: one eastwards into lake Päijänne and another outflow westwards through a chain of lakes that consists of the lakes Kuohijärvi, Kukkia, Iso-Roine, Hauhonselkä and Ilmoilanselkä, and ends into lake Mallasvesi, from which the waters flow through Vanajavesi and Pyhäjärvi towards the Kokemäenjoki and the Gulf of Bothnia in the west.

Lake Lummene has inspired cosmetics producer company Lumene to choose its trademark name.
