= Mallasvesi =

Lake in the country of Finland

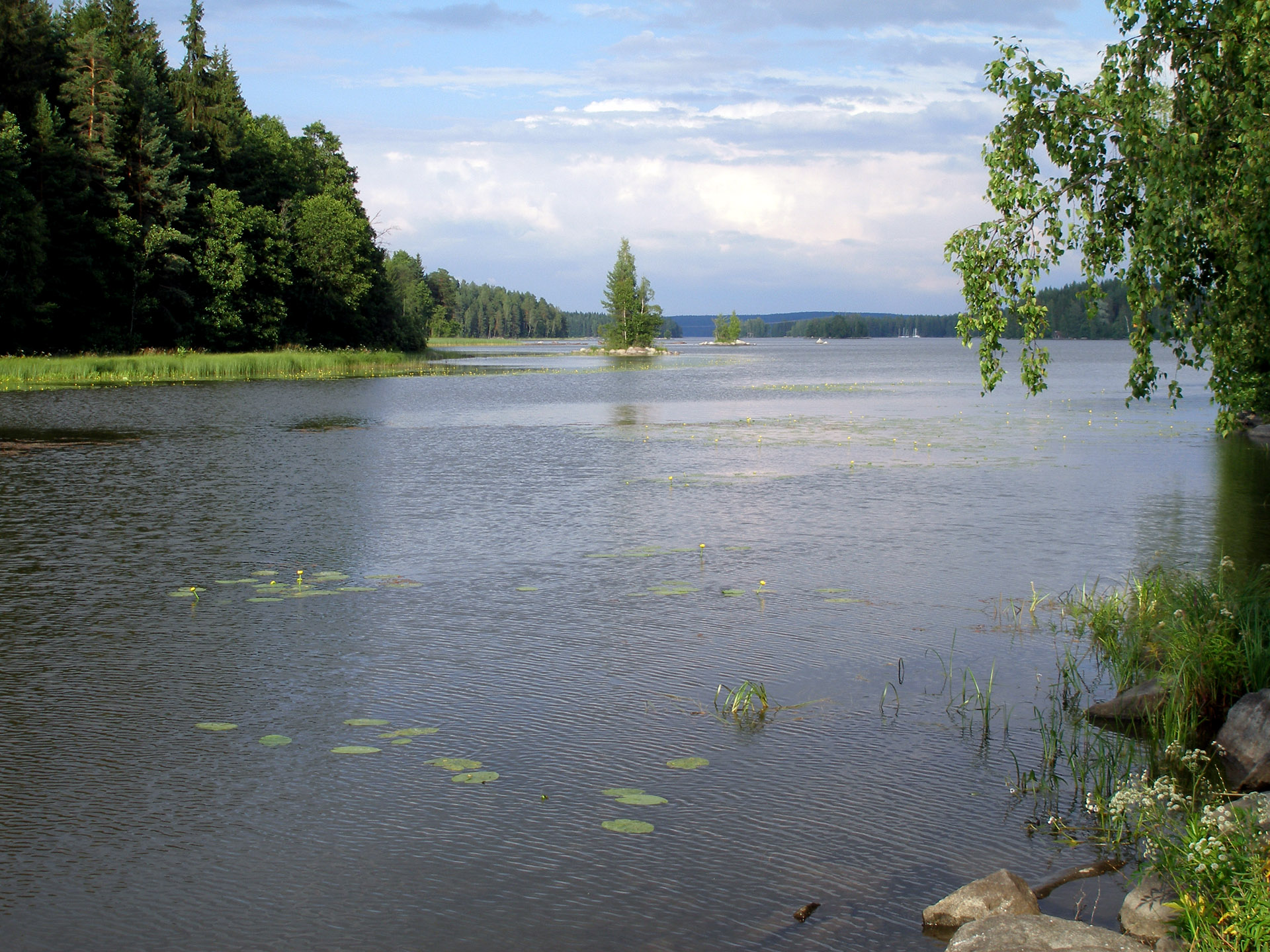
- Mallasvesi in Valkeakoski

- Location within Finland
- Location: Pälkäne, Valkeakoski
- Coordinates: 61°18′N 24°10′E
- Type: Lake
- Primary inflows: Kostianvirta, Sulkusalmi
- Primary outflows: Valkeakoski rapids
- Catchment area: Kokemäenjoki
- Basin countries: Finland
- Surface area: 55.711 km^{2} (21.510 sq mi)
- Average depth: 6.84 m (22.4 ft)
- Max. depth: 32.89 m (107.9 ft)
- Water volume: 0.384 km^{3} (311,000 acre⋅ft)
- Shore length^{1}: 159.37 km (99.03 mi)
- Surface elevation: 84.2 m (276 ft)
- Frozen: December–April
- Islands: Hausalo (0.94 m^{2}), Karhunsalo (0.37 m^{2})
- Settlements: Valkeakoski, Pälkäne
- ^{1} Shore length is not a well-defined measure.

Mallasvesi is a medium-sized lake in Finland. The lake is part of the Kokemäenjoki basin and located in the municipalities of Pälkäne and Valkeakoski in the Pirkanmaa region. It is a part of a chain of lakes that begins from the lakes Lummene, Vehkajärvi and Vesijako at the drainage divide between the Kokemäenjoki and Kymijoki basins and flows westwards through lakes Kukkia, Iso-Roine, Hauhonselkä and Ilmoilanselkä.

== See also ==
- List of lakes in Finland
