= Pälkäne =

- Municipality
- Pälkäneen kunta Pälkäne kommun
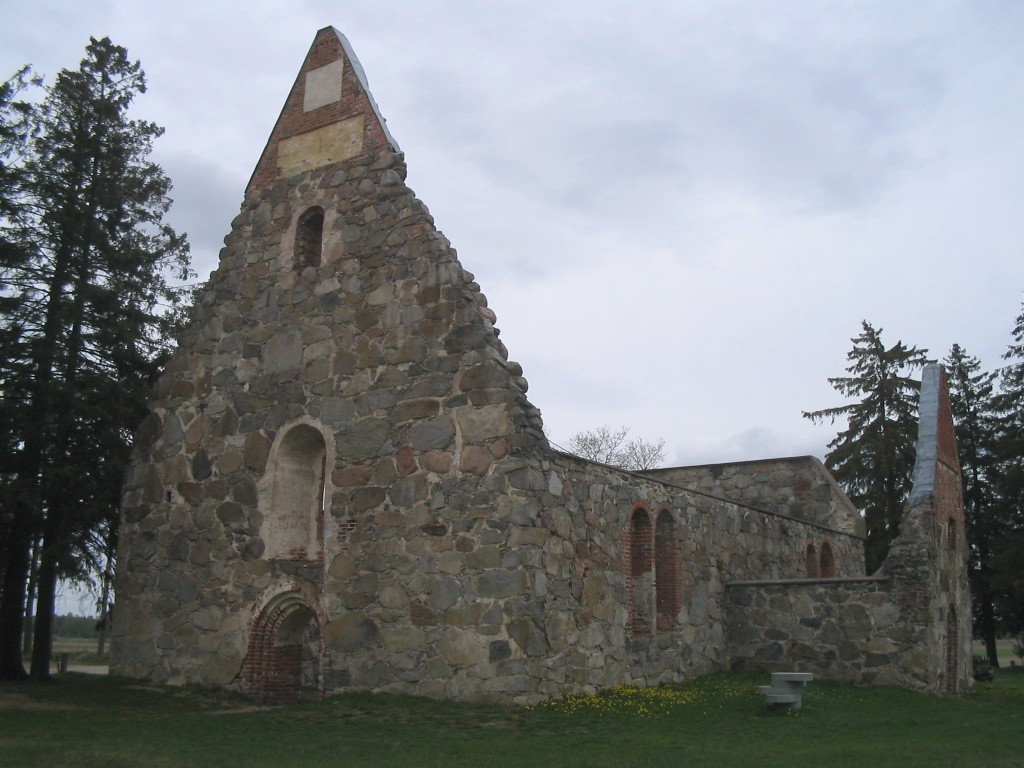
- Ruins of the medieval church in Pälkäne

- Coat of arms

- Location of Pälkäne in Finland
- Interactive map of Pälkäne
- Coordinates: 61°20.3′N 024°16′E
- Country: Finland
- Region: Pirkanmaa
- Sub-region: Tampere
- Charter: 1866
- Seat: Onkkaala

Government
  - Municipal manager: Pauliina Pikka

Area (2018-01-01)
  - Total: 738.15 km^{2} (285.00 sq mi)
  - Land: 560.71 km^{2} (216.49 sq mi)
  - Water: 177.65 km^{2} (68.59 sq mi)
  - Rank: 152nd largest in Finland

Population (2025-12-31)
  - Total: 6,146
  - Rank: 150th largest in Finland
  - Density: 10.96/km^{2} (28.4/sq mi)

Population by native language
  - Finnish: 95.6% (official)
  - Swedish: 0.3%
  - Others: 4.1%

Population by age
  - 0 to 14: 14.5%
  - 15 to 64: 55.9%
  - 65 or older: 29.5%
- Time zone: UTC+02:00 (EET)
  - Summer (DST): UTC+03:00 (EEST)
- Website: www.palkane.fi

Pälkäne (Finnish pronunciation: [ˈpælkæne]) is a municipality of Finland. It is part of the Pirkanmaa region. The municipality has a population of 6,146 (31 December 2025) and covers an area of 738.15 square kilometres (285.00 sq mi) of which 177.65 km^{2} (68.59 sq mi). The population density is 10.96 inhabitants per square kilometre (28.4/sq mi). Onkkaala is the administrative center of the municipality. Tampere is located 38 kilometres (24 mi) northwest of the center of Pälkäne.

The municipality is unilingually Finnish. Many people from Helsinki and the surrounding cities own summer cottages and residences in Pälkäne, making the small town very busy during summer vacation seasons. Pälkäne is a very popular summer vacation resort given its diverse services, high-quality swimming beach, beautiful nature and close location to big cities. From start of year 2007 Pälkäne and Luopioinen were merged to a new municipality of Pälkäne.

== Geography ==
=== Nature ===
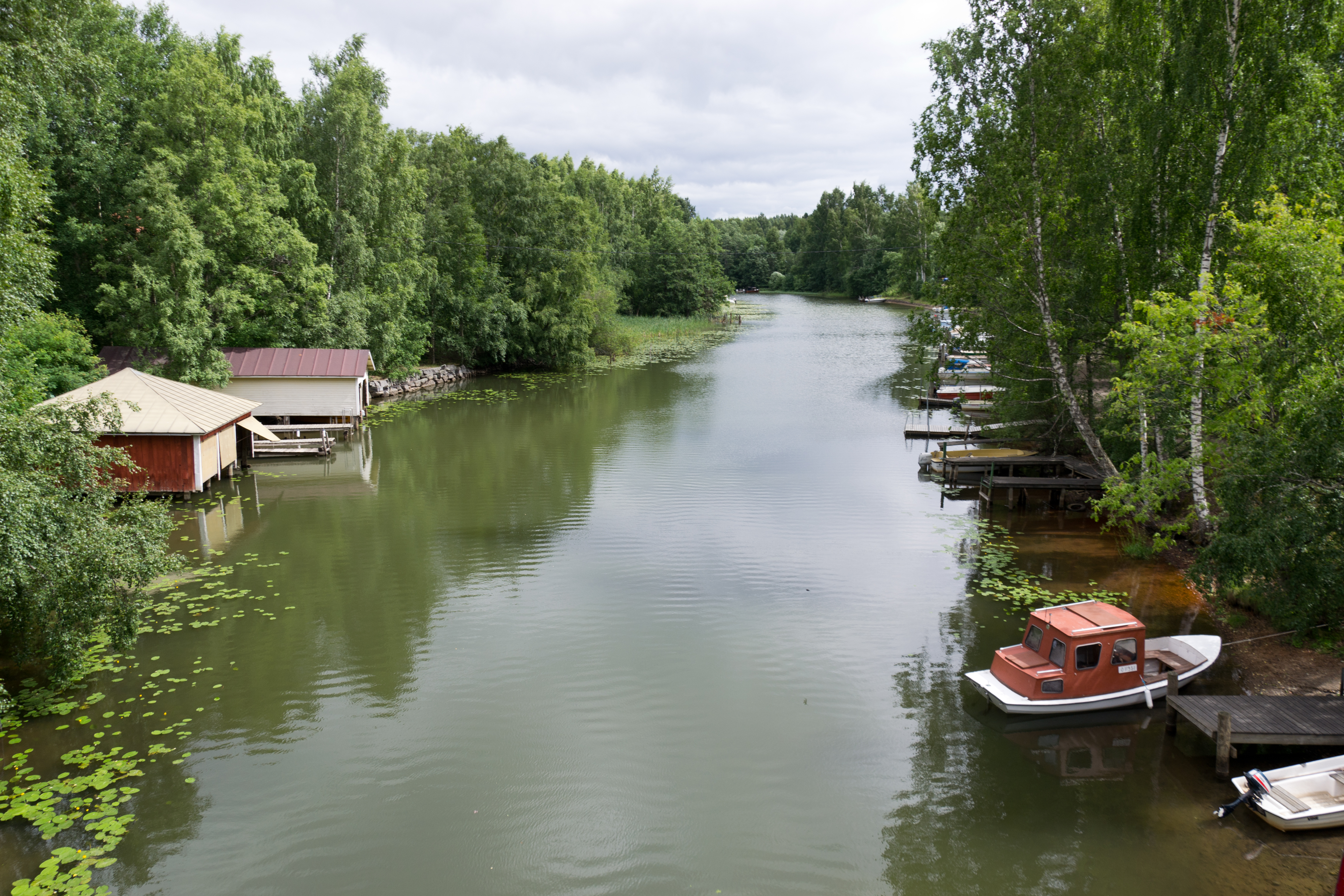
Kostianvirta flows through Pälkäne

The landscape of Pälkäne is dominated by several lakes, the largest of which are Lake Mallasvesi on the west side of Onkkaala and Lake Pälkänevesi on its east side, as well as Lake Roine on the Kangasala side and Lake Ilmoilanselkä on the Hauho (Hämeenlinna) side. Lake Kukkia is situated in the area of the former municipality of Luopioinen. In the western part of Pälkäne, Roine and Mallasvesi are separated by the rather large island of Hausalo.

The Kostianvirta River, which belongs part to the drainage basin of the Kokemäki River, flows between Lake Pälkänevesi and Lake Mallasvesi. As the average water level of both lakes is about 84 meters above sea level, the flow direction of Kostianvirta sometimes changes, especially due to the spring meltwater.

=== Villages ===
- Äimälä
- Aitoo
- Ämmätsä
- Epaala
- Evinsalo
- Haltia
- Harhala
- Huhtioinen
- Huntila
- Kaitamo
- Kajantila
- Kankahainen
- Kantokylä
- Kantola
- Kärväntälä
- Karviala
- Kaukkala
- Kinnala
- Kirpu
- Kollola
- Kotila
- Kouvala
- Kuisema
- Kukkola
- Kuohijoki
- Kuuliala
- Kyynärö
- Laitikkala
- Lemmettylä
- Lovensalo
- Luikala
- Luopioinen
- Mälkilä
- Mällinoja
- Miemola
- Mustilahti
- Myttäälä
- Okerla
- Oksala
- Onkkaala
- Padankoski
- Pappila
- Pitkäjärvi
- Pohjalahti
- Puutikkala
- Rautajärvi
- Ruokola
- Ruotsila
- Sairiala
- Salmentaka
- Sappee
- Säynäjärvi
- Seitsye
- Tauriala
- Tausti
- Tommola
- Töyräniemi
- Vahdermetsä
- Vuolijoki

== Culture ==
A former coat of arms of Pälkäne

=== Food ===
In the 1980s, Pälkäne's traditional parish dishes were called local sweetened potato casserole called tuuvinki, salted bream, slowly smoked meat, Tavastian limppu bread called varikoinen, sweet sahti, and plum kissel.

== People ==
- Matti Helenius-Seppälä (1870–1920)
- August Hyöki (1874–1960)
- Eemil Linna (1876–1951)
- Teemu Mäntysaari (born 1987)
- Väinö Sipilä (1897–1987)
- Toivo Salonen (born 1933)
- Mikko Leppilampi (born 1978)
- Riku Helenius (born 1988)

== See also ==
- Battle of Pälkäne
