= Hauho =

- Former municipality
- Hauhon kunta Hauho kommun
- Coat of arms

- Location of Hauho in Finland
- Coordinates: 61°10′20″N 024°33′45″E
- Country: Finland
- Region: Kanta-Häme
- Sub-region: Hämeenlinna sub-region
- Charter: 1868
- Consolidated: 2009

Area
  - Total: 443.37 km^{2} (171.19 sq mi)
  - Land: 354.53 km^{2} (136.88 sq mi)
  - Water: 88.84 km^{2} (34.30 sq mi)

Population (2008-12-31)
  - Total: 3,934
  - Density: 11.10/km^{2} (28.74/sq mi)
- Time zone: UTC+2 (EET)
  - Summer (DST): UTC+3 (EEST)

Hauho is a former municipality of Finland. It was situated in the province of Southern Finland and is today a part of the region of Kanta-Häme.

Hauho was amalgamated with the municipality of Hämeenlinna on 1 January 2009. Prior to the amalgamation, Hauho – which was unilingually Finnish – had a population of 3,934 (31 December 2008) and covered an area of 443.13 square kilometres (171.09 sq mi) of which 86.42 square kilometres (33.37 sq mi) was water. The population density was 11.1 inhabitants per square kilometre (29/sq mi).

It has been calculated that Hauho lies at Finland's "population-centre" (Weber point), that is to say, the point in Finland closest on average to the place of residence of every inhabitant of the country.

Lakes Iso-Roine, Hauhonselkä, and Ilmoilanselkä are located in Hauho.
