= Iso-Roine =

Lake in Pälkäne, Finland

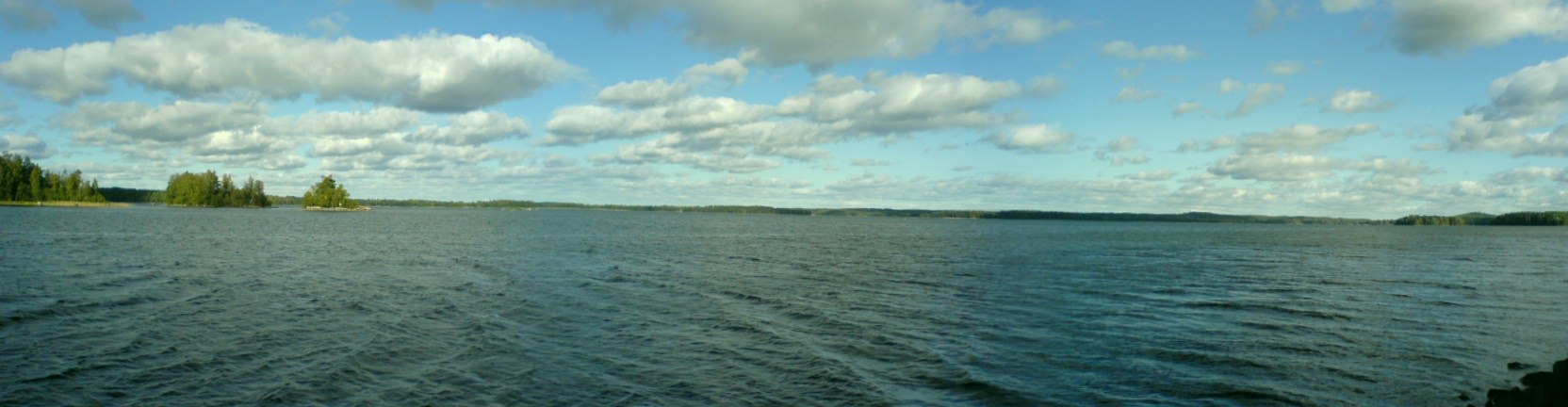

- Location within Finland
- Coordinates: 61°13′00″N 24°34′00″E
- Basin countries: Finland
- Surface area: 30.871 km^{2} (11.919 sq mi)
- Average depth: 7.17 m (23.5 ft)
- Max. depth: 73 m (240 ft)
- Water volume: 0.221 km^{3} (179,000 acre⋅ft)
- Shore length^{1}: 146.7 km (91.2 mi)
- Surface elevation: 84.2 m (276 ft)
- Frozen: December–April
- Islands: Lammassaari, Huhtisaari, Papinsaari
- Settlements: Hauho
- ^{1} Shore length is not a well-defined measure.

Iso-Roine (also Iso Roinevesi) is medium-sized lake in the Kokemäenjoki main catchment area in the Kanta-Häme region in Finland. The lake is located in the area of the city of Hämeenlinna. It is part of a chain of lakes that begins from the lakes Lummene and Vesijako at the drainage divide between the Kokemäenjoki and Kymijoki basins and flows westwards from there through the lakes Kuohijärvi and Kukkia into the Lake Iso-Roine, which in turn drains into lake Mallasvesi through the lakes Hauhonselkä and Ilmoilanselkä.

With a depth of more than 70 meters, this lake is one of the deepest lakes in Finland.

== See also ==
- List of lakes in Finland
