= Pyhäjärvi (Tampere region) =

Lake in Pirkanmaa, Finland

Lake Pyhäjärvi
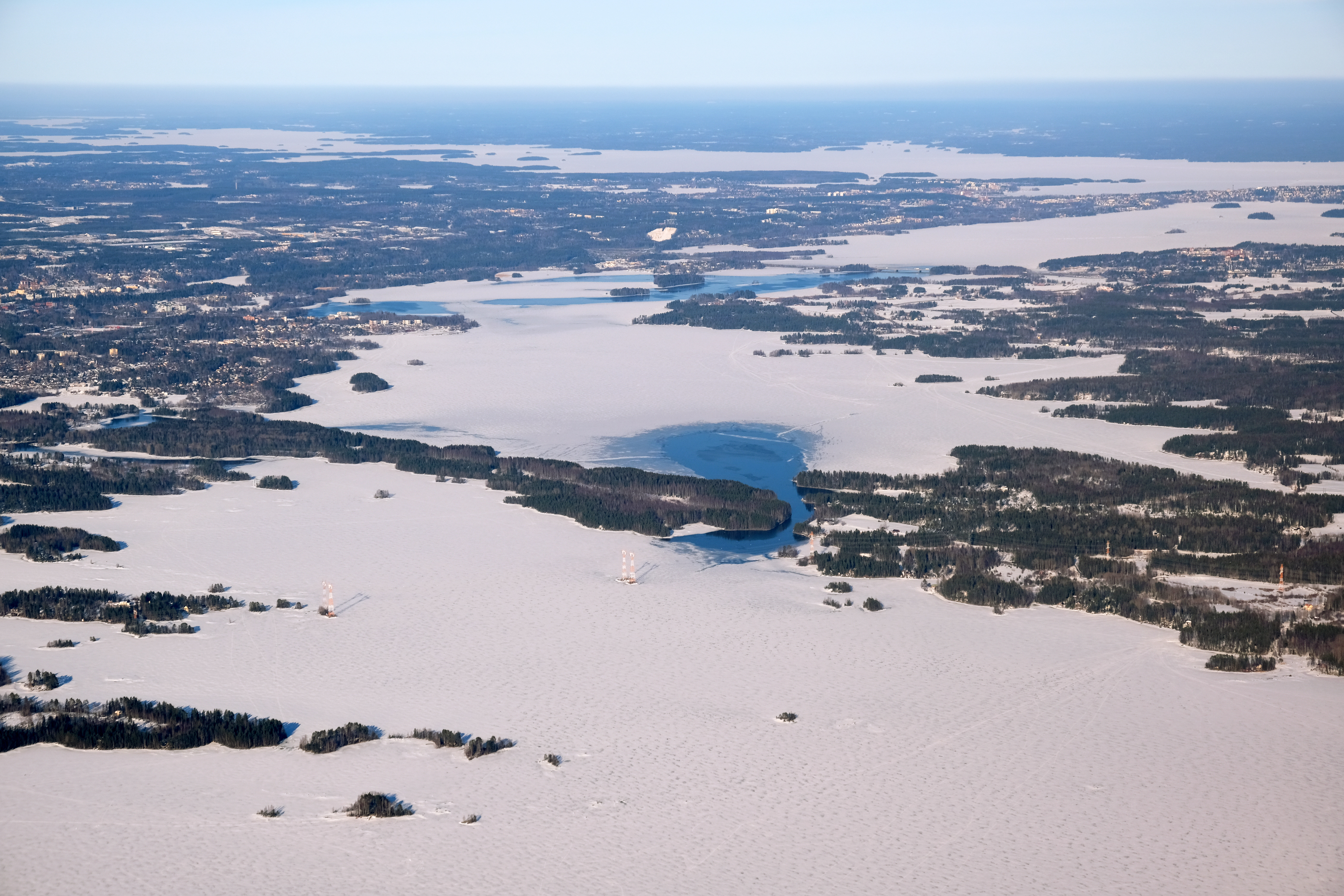
- Aerial view of Pyhäjärvi.

- Location within Finland
- Location: Pirkanmaa, Finland
- Coordinates: 61°29′N 023°40′E
- Primary inflows: Tammerkoski
- Primary outflows: Nokianvirta
- Basin countries: Finland
- Surface area: 121.61 km^{2} (46.95 sq mi)
- Max. depth: 46 m (151 ft)
- Surface elevation: 77.2 m (253 ft)
- Islands: Viikinsaari
- Settlements: Tampere, Nokia, Lempäälä

Pyhäjärvi (Finnish: [ˈpyhæˌjærʋi]) is a lake in southern Finland. Although the name means "holy lake" in modern Finnish, it probably originally meant "border lake". Pyhäjärvi is shaped like the letter C with the cities of Tampere and Nokia at the northern end, and the town of Lempäälä at the southern end.

The lake is fed by the water running through the Tammerkoski rapids in the center of Tampere from the north, and by the waters from lake Vanajavesi in the south. Due to the Tammerkoski rapids, the water in Pyhäjärvi is warmer and richer in ozone than that in the northern lake, Näsijärvi, which results in the life in this lake being richer, even though the water is more polluted.

A number of other lakes are also named Pyhäjärvi in Finland and its former territories.
