= Valkeakoski =

- Town
- Valkeakosken kaupunki Valkeakoski stad
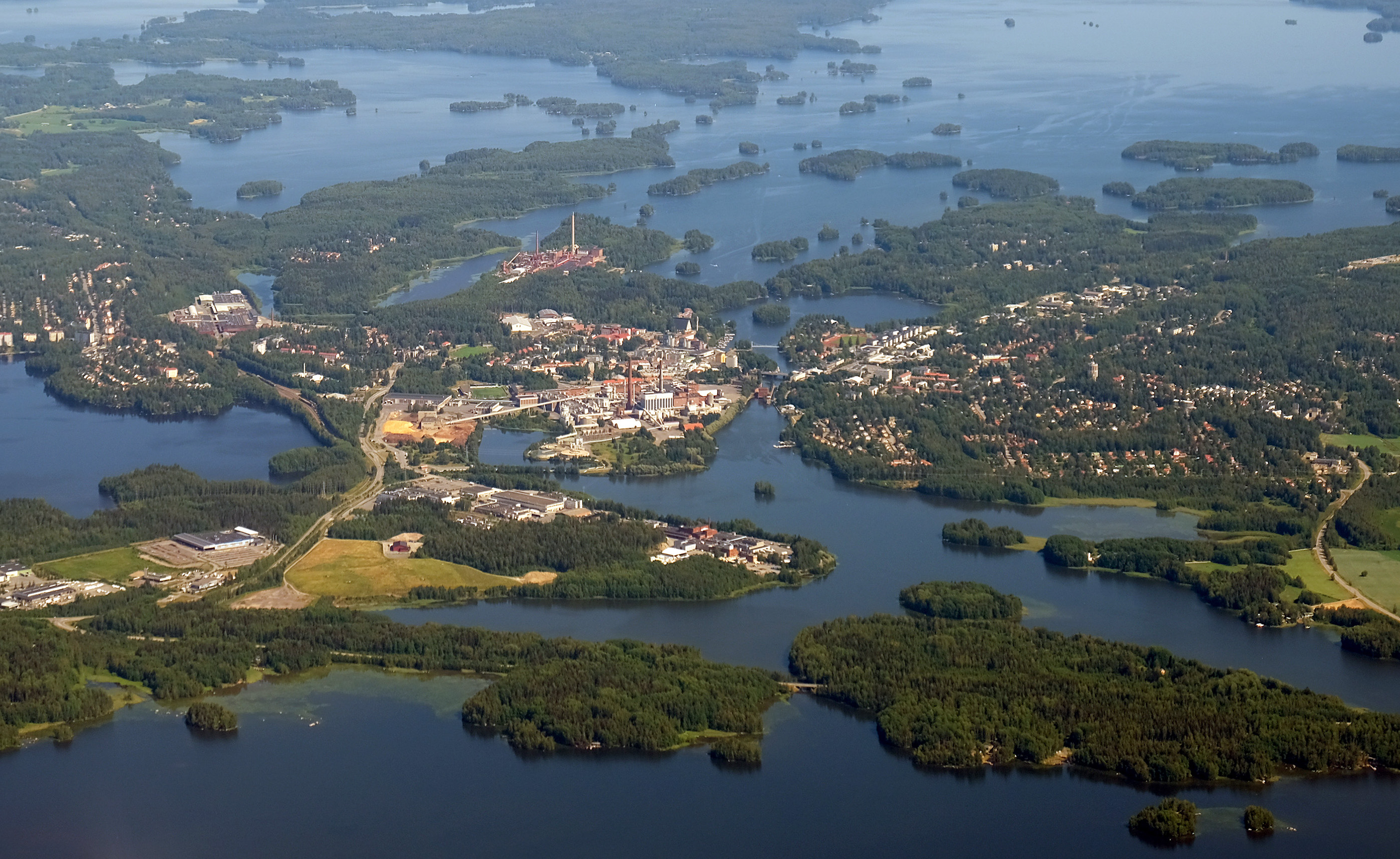
- Aerial view of Valkeakoski

- Coat of arms

- Location of Valkeakoski in Finland
- Interactive map of Valkeakoski
- Coordinates: 61°16′N 024°02′E
- Country: Finland
- Region: Pirkanmaa
- Sub-region: Southern Pirkanmaa
- Charter: 1923

Government
  - Town manager: Jukka Varonen

Area (2018-01-01)
  - Total: 372.03 km^{2} (143.64 sq mi)
  - Land: 272.05 km^{2} (105.04 sq mi)
  - Water: 100.06 km^{2} (38.63 sq mi)
  - Rank: 240th largest in Finland

Population (2025-12-31)
  - Total: 20,762
  - Rank: 51st largest in Finland
  - Density: 76.32/km^{2} (197.7/sq mi)

Population by native language
  - Finnish: 93.6% (official)
  - Swedish: 0.2%
  - Others: 6.2%

Population by age
  - 0 to 14: 15.5%
  - 15 to 64: 56.8%
  - 65 or older: 27.7%
- Time zone: UTC+02:00 (EET)
  - Summer (DST): UTC+03:00 (EEST)
- Website: www.valkeakoski.fi/en/

Valkeakoski (Finnish pronunciation: [ˈʋɑlkeɑˌkoski]; lit. "white rapids") is a town and municipality in Finland. It is located 35 kilometres (22 mi) south of Tampere, 45 km (28 mi) north of Hämeenlinna and 150 km (93 mi) north of Helsinki in the Pirkanmaa region. The municipality has a population of 20,762 (31 December 2025) and covers an area of 372.03 square kilometres (143.64 sq mi) of which 100.06 km^{2} (38.63 sq mi) is water. The population density is 76.32 inhabitants per square kilometre (197.7/sq mi).

The municipality is unilingually Finnish.

Valkeakoski is best known for its paper industry and domestically highly successful football team, FC Haka.

The town and the paper industry have both grown by the Valkeakoski rapids between the lake Mallasvesi in the north and the lake Vanajavesi in the south.

== History ==
The Valkeakoski area is known to have been inhabited since the Iron Age. More than a thousand years ago, the ridges on the area served as a foundation of the Rapola fort. In the following Middle Ages, the mill town Sääksmäki was the center of the area. However, industrialization towards the end of the 19th century increased the importance of what became the contemporary town of Valkeakoski. The channel of Valkeakoski was opened in 1869, and the first paper mill was completed in 1873, marking the beginning of a continuing tradition of the forest industry. The municipality of Sääksmäki, from which the town of Valkeakoski was detached in 1923 was consolidated with Valkeakoski in 1973.

== Districts, neighborhoods and villages ==
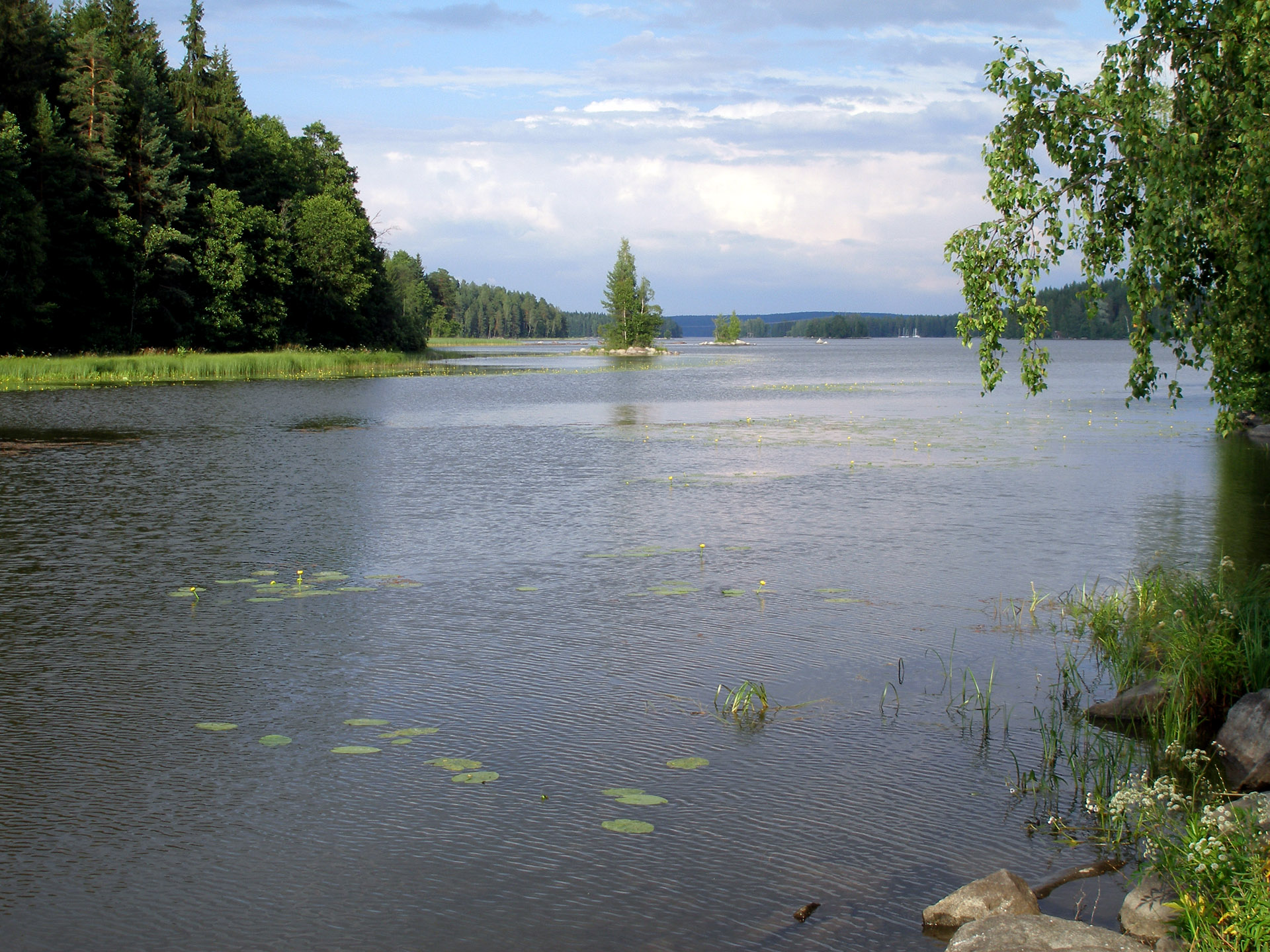
Kärsänlahti bay on lake Mallasvesi

=== Countryside and villages ===
The entire countryside of Valkeakoski consists mainly of the former Sääksmäki municipality areas.

  - Sääksmäki (consists of Huittula and Ritvala, Kemmola, Mälkiäinen, Haukila, Uskila, Tykölä, Viranmaa, Kasuri / Koivuniemi / Raija, Metsäkansa, Ylenjoki, Konho, Nikkarinhanko / Muti, Rantoo, Yli-Nissi, Kärjenniemi, Vedentaka, Kaapelinkulma, Kannistonmäki, Viuha, Mattila, Vuorentaka, Valto, Paino, Tarttila, Pyörönmaa and Vanhakylä)

=== Districts ===
There are 25 districts in what is considered the urban area of Valkeaskoki. These districts are further divided into neighborhoods. The districts and neighborhoods of Valkeakoski are:

1. 1st district
  - Tervasaari, Myllysaari, Tietola and Tehtaankatu
2. 2nd district
  - Ydinkeskusta, Tallinmäki and Kerhomaja
3. 3rd district
  - Kauppilanmäki, Yrjölä and Heikkilä
4. 4th district
  - Jyräänmäki, Haka-alue, Kaskela, Laiska, Lumikorpi, Naakanrinne, Naakka and Pässinmäki
5. Antinniemi
6. Roukko
7. 7th district
  - Matinmäki, Mäntylä, Roukonperä and Vääräkoivu
8. Lintula
9. Kirjasniemi
10. Ulvajanniemi
11. 11th district
  - Pohjankorpi and Tyry
12. 12th district
  - Juhannusvuori, Kokkola, Naakka, Raikas and Sassi
13. Jätevedenpuhdistamo
14. 14th district
  - Raija and Koivuniemi
15. Sointula
16. Eerola
17. Pispantalli
18. 18th district
  - Holmi and Varsanhäntä
19. Kärjenniemi
20. Irjala
21. Kemmola
22. Juusonranta
23. Valto
24. Mahlianmaa
25. Länsi-Lintula

In addition, outside of but in the vicinity of these districts lay Vanhakylä and Viuha.

== Sports ==
Valkeakoski is notable for the football team FC Haka and also other Haka sections, especially the cross-country skiing section. The "skiing Haka" is one of the most successful skiing teams in Finland. The other major local sports organization Koskenpojat has also been really successful, winning many national championships in aerobic gymnastics.

== Twin towns – sister cities ==
Valkeakoski is twinned with:

- Gotland, Sweden
- Kragerø, Norway (1954)
- Sokol, Russia (1971)
- Vechelde, Germany (1976)
- Jelenia Góra, Poland (1979)
- Nanchang, China (1997)
- Mariehamn, Åland Islands, Finland (1999)

== Notable persons from Valkeakoski ==
- Veikko Hakulinen
- Mika Kallio
- Kari-Pekka Laaksonen
- Pentti Linkola
- Iris Sihvonen
- Emil Wikström
- Juhani Peltonen
- Alpo Suhonen
- Antti Muurinen
- Jani Nyman

== Notable places and events ==
- National Football Museum
- Työväen Musiikkitapahtuma music festival (freely translated as Workers' Music Event)
- Tehtaan kenttä

== Gallery ==
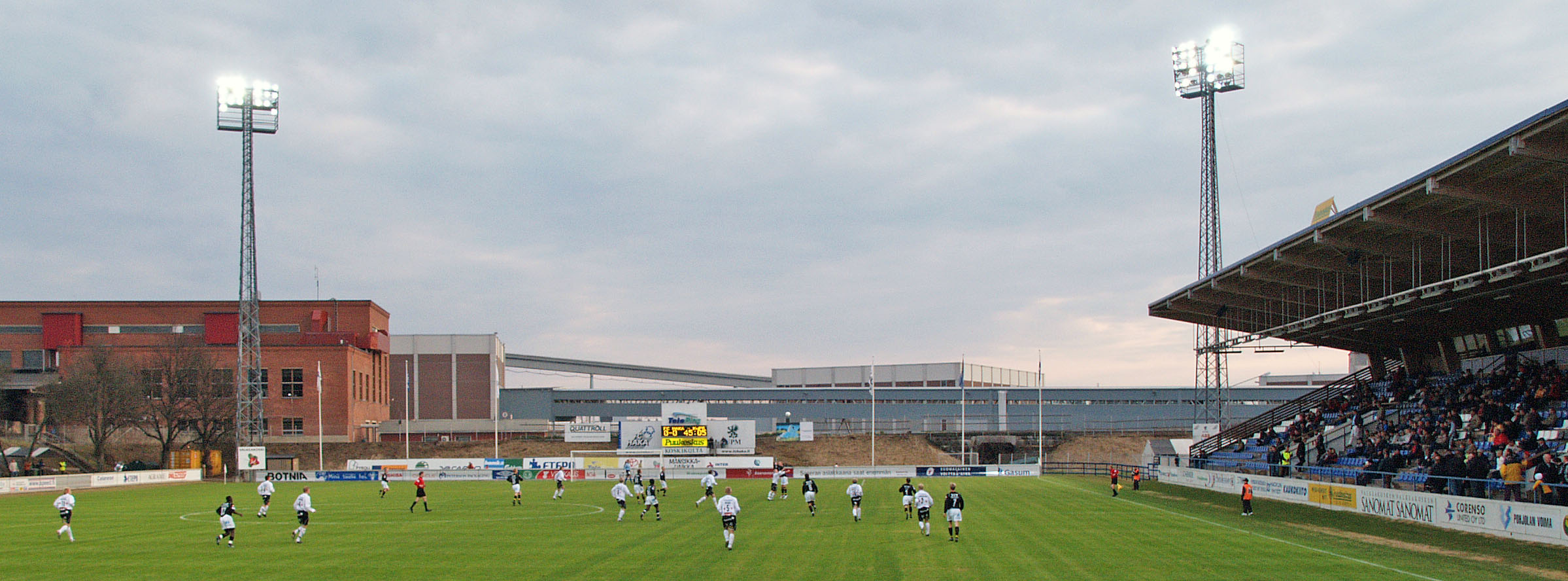
Tehtaan kenttä – the football stadium in Valkeakoski, Finland, home of the football team FC Haka Valkeakoski

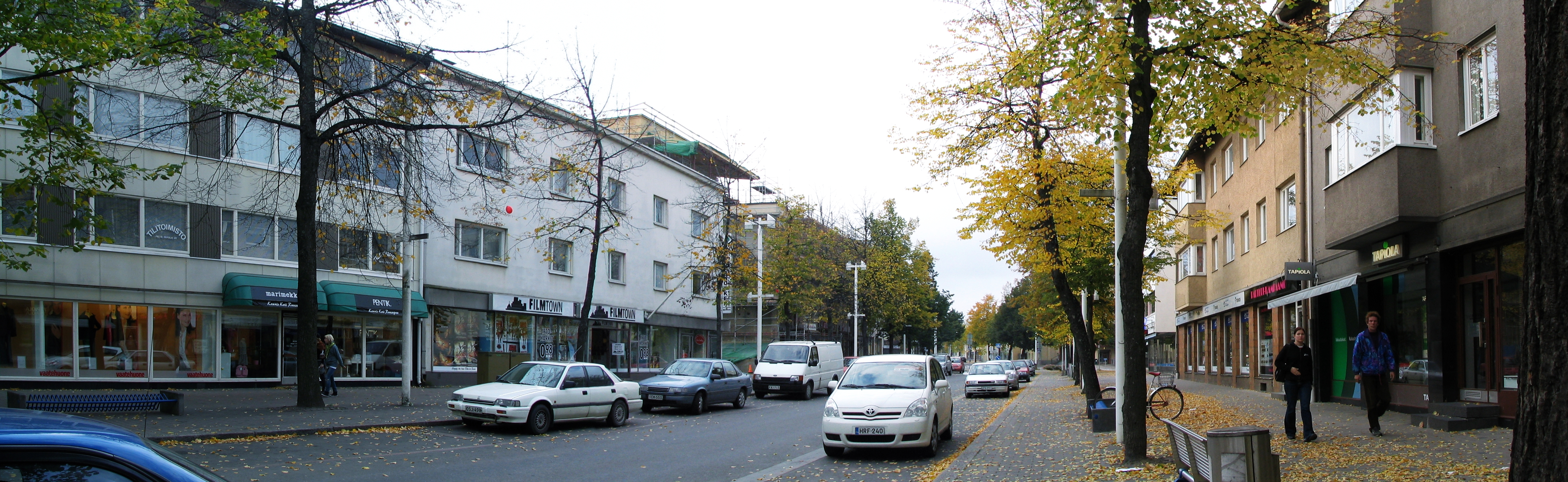
Valtakatu, the main shopping street of Valkeakoski

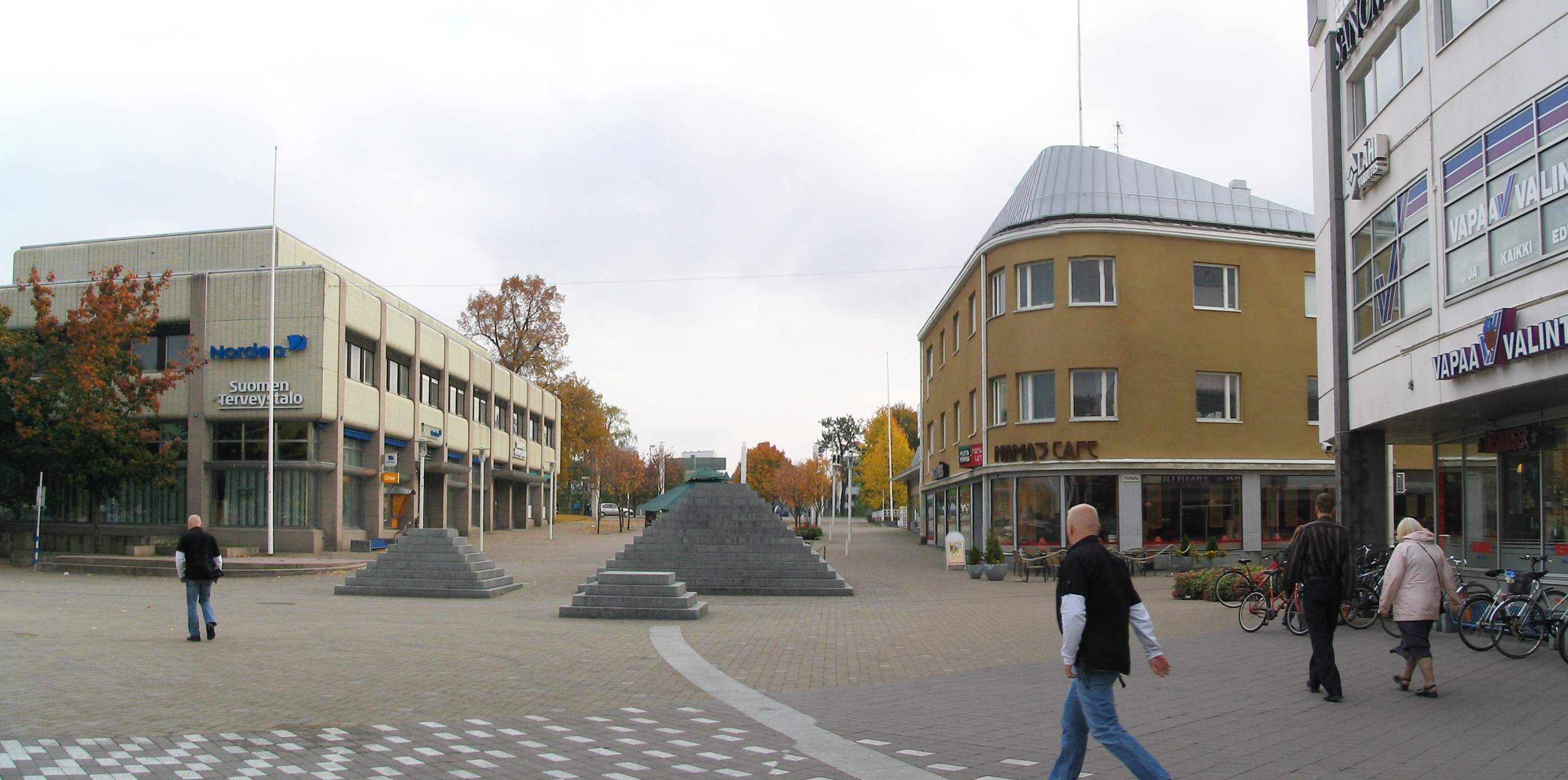
Downtown Valkeakoski

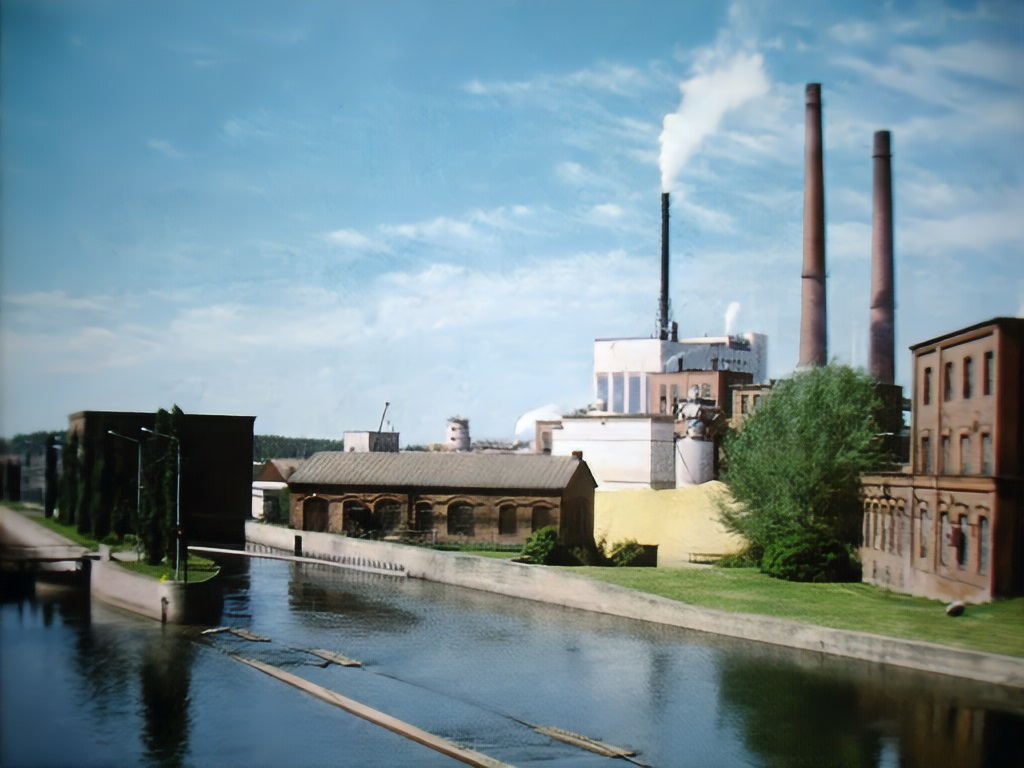
Factories in Valkeakoski
