= Pirkanmaa =

Region of Finland

Pirkanmaa Birkaland
- Region
- Region of Pirkanmaa; Pirkanmaan maakunta (Finnish); Landskapet Birkaland (Swedish)
- Coat of arms

- Pirkanmaa in Finland
- Coordinates: 61°42′N 23°43′E
- Country: Finland
- Historical province: Satakunta, Tavastia
- Capital: Tampere
- Other towns: Akaa, Ikaalinen, Kangasala, Mänttä-Vilppula, Nokia, Orivesi, Parkano, Sastamala, Valkeakoski, Virrat and Ylöjärvi

Government
  - Regional Mayor: Anna-Mari Ahonen

Area
  - Total: 14,469.39 km^{2} (5,586.66 sq mi)

Population (2022)
  - Total: 529,100
  - Density: 36.57/km^{2} (94.71/sq mi)

GDP
  - Total: €17.437 billion (2015)
  - Per capita: €34,546 (2015)
- Time zone: UTC+2 (EET)
  - Summer (DST): UTC+3 (EEST)
- ISO 3166 code: FI-11
- NUTS: 192
- Regional animal: White-tailed deer (Odocoileus albavirginianus)
- Regional bird: White wagtail (Motacilla alba)
- Regional fish: Asp (Aspius aspius)
- Regional flower: Bird cherry (Prunus padus)
- Regional stone: Orbiculite
- Regional lake: Lake Längelmävesi
- Website: pirkanmaa.fi

Pirkanmaa (Finnish: [ˈpirkɑmˌmɑː]; Swedish: Birkaland; Latin: Birkaria), also known as Tampere Region in government documents, is a region of Finland. It borders the regions of Satakunta, South Ostrobothnia, Central Finland, Päijät-Häme, Kanta-Häme and Southwest Finland. Most of the water area in the Kokemäki River watershed is located in the Pirkanmaa region, although Lake Vanajavesi is partly in the Kanta-Häme region. The region got its name from Pirkkala, which in the Middle Ages comprised most of present-day Pirkanmaa. Tampere is the regional center and capital of Pirkanmaa, and at the same time the largest city in the region.

The total population of Pirkanmaa was 529,100 on 30 June 2022, which makes it the second largest among Finland's regions after Uusimaa. The population density is well over twice the Finnish average, and most of its population is largely concentrated in the Tampere metropolitan area.

== History ==
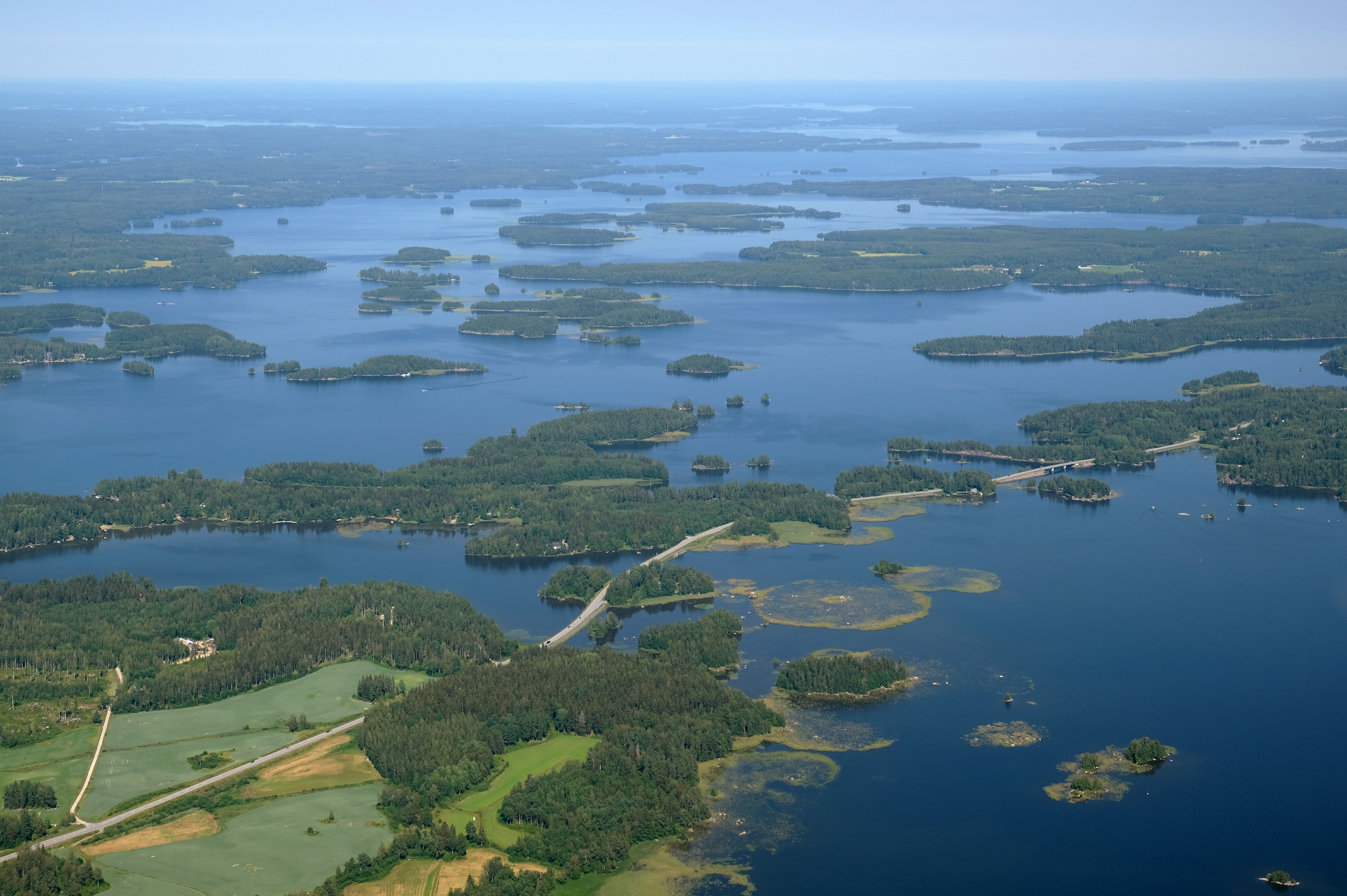
Aerial view of Längelmävesi, the regional lake of Pirkanmaa

Pirkanmaa has been inhabited for thousands of years. In the Bronze Age, agriculture replaced hunting, and in the Iron Age a settlement stretched from Eurajoki to Längelmäki, which was Finland's northernmost area of peasant culture from the 8th century. In the 11th century, the settlement was concentrated along River Kokemäenjoki and Lake Pyhäjärvi. In the 14th century, present-day Pirkanmaa was part of the historical Satakunta, the main part of which was Upper Satakunta and a small part of which was also Lower Satakunta. After the wilderness period, the absence of towns slowed down development. King Gustav III founded Tampere in 1775, and in the 1840s it became Finland's most important industrial centre. New inventions such as sawdust, cellulose and papermaking boosted development. Industries were established in Valkeakoski, Nokia and Mänttä, among others. Tampere became the centre of the province and a railway junction.

During the Finnish Civil War, Pirkanmaa was under the control of the Reds and Tampere was the centre of the Reds until the city surrendered to the Whites after a heavy battle in April 1918. After the war, industrialisation intensified. During the Winter War, Tampere and other cities were bombed. The County of Pirkanmaa was established in 1956. The county was also called Tammermaa, but gradually Pirkanmaa became the name of the region. In the 1950s, the only city in the province was Tampere, but from 1963 to 1977 the municipalities were made into cities. The number of municipalities decreased in the second half of the 20th century, and old place names were reintroduced as municipalities merged. In 1994 Finland was divided into 20 functional economic provinces, and Pirkanmaa was one of them.

== Municipalities ==
The region of Pirkanmaa consists of five sub-regions and 23 municipalities, 12 of which have city status (marked in bold).

=== Municipalities on the map ===
Cities and municipalities of Pirkanmaa.

=== Sub-regions ===
Tampere sub-region

- Hämeenkyrö (Tavastkyro)
- **Kangasala**
- Kuhmoinen (Kuhmois)
- Lempäälä (Lembois)
- **Nokia**
- **Orivesi**
- Pirkkala (Birkala)
- Pälkäne
- **Tampere** (Tammerfors)
- Vesilahti (Vesilax)
- **Ylöjärvi**

Northwest Pirkanmaa

- **Ikaalinen** (Ikalis)
- Kihniö
- **Parkano**

Upper Pirkanmaa

- Juupajoki
- **Mänttä-Vilppula** (Mänttä-Filpula)
- Ruovesi
- **Virrat** (Virdois)

South Pirkanmaa

- **Akaa** (Ackas)
- Urjala (Urdiala)
- **Valkeakoski**

Southwest Pirkanmaa

- Punkalaidun (Pungalaitio)
- **Sastamala**

=== List of municipalities ===
Coat of arms	Municipality	Population	Land area (km^{2})	Density (/km^{2})	Finnish speakers	Swedish speakers	Other speakers
coat of arms of Akaa	Akaa	16,429	293	56	97 %	0.2 %	3 %
Coat of arms of Hämeenkyrö	Hämeenkyrö	10,249	464	22	98 %	0.2 %	2 %
coat of arms of Ikaalinen	Ikaalinen	6,704	750	9	95 %	0 %	5 %
coat of arms of Juupajoki	Juupajoki	1,663	258	6	97 %	0 %	2 %
Coat of arms of Kangasala	Kangasala	34,379	658	52	96 %	0.3 %	4 %
coat of arms of Kihniö	Kihniö	1,670	357	5	98 %	0 %	2 %
Coat of arms of Kuhmoinen	Kuhmoinen	1,979	661	3	97 %	0 %	2 %
Coat of arms of Lempäälä	Lempäälä	25,041	270	93	96 %	0.3 %	3 %
coat of arms of Mänttä-Vilppula	Mänttä-Vilppula	9,109	535	17	95 %	0.2 %	5 %
Coat of arms of Nokia	Nokia	36,571	288	127	95 %	0.3 %	4 %
Coat of arms of Orivesi	Orivesi	8,858	800	11	97 %	0.1 %	3 %
coat of arms of Parkano	Parkano	6,011	853	7	96 %	0 %	4 %
Coat of arms of Pirkkala	Pirkkala	21,373	81	263	95 %	0.4 %	5 %
Coat of arms of Punkalaidun	Punkalaidun	2,546	361	7	96 %	0 %	4 %
Coat of arms of Pälkäne	Pälkäne	6,146	561	11	96 %	0.3 %	4 %
coat of arms of Ruovesi	Ruovesi	3,995	777	5	96 %	0.3 %	4 %
Coat of arms of Sastamala	Sastamala	23,332	1,429	16	96 %	0.2 %	4 %
Coat of arms of Tampere	Tampere	263,337	525	502	88 %	0.5 %	12 %
coat of arms of Urjala	Urjala	4,440	476	9	96 %	0.2 %	3 %
coat of arms of Valkeakoski	Valkeakoski	20,762	272	76	94 %	0.2 %	6 %
Coat of arms of Vesilahti	Vesilahti	4,532	301	15	97 %	0.4 %	2 %
coat of arms of Virrat	Virrat	6,126	1,163	5	95 %	0 %	5 %
Coat of arms of Ylöjärvi	Ylöjärvi	33,658	1,116	30	96 %	0.4 %	3 %
	Total	548,910	13,249	41	92 %	0.4 %	8 %

== Economy ==
The Gross domestic product (GDP) of the region was €18.3 billion in 2016, accounting for 8.5% of Finnish economic output. GDP per capita adjusted for purchasing power was €36,040 or 92% of the EU27 average in the same year. Pirkanmaa's GDP was the second highest among the regions and the seventh highest among the nineteen regions per capita.

The economic structure of Pirkanmaa typically focuses on services for post-industrial society. A nationally significant ICT concentration has grown in Tampere. Thanks to its population base, the city is also a major trading center. Industry's share of value added and jobs in Pirkanmaa is higher than the Finnish average. The region is one of Finland's main centers of manufacturing, has a long tradition of industrial activity and a good education network. The industry is largely concentrated in Tampere and its surroundings, such as towns of Nokia and Valkeakoski. Mänttä-Vilppula is also a major industrial center. Agriculture accounts for a small share of economic activity. In the western part of the region, agricultural production is dominated by dairy cattle, in the south by cereals, and in the north by forestry.

== Demographics ==
=== Population ===
Population size 1990–2025
Year	Population
1990	430,651
1995	440,734
2000	453,319
2005	471,409
2010	491,746
2015	508,448
2020	522,852
2025	548,910

=== Language ===
Languages in Pirkanmaa (2018)
Languages	percent
Finnish	94.8%
Russian	0.83%
Arabic	0.48%
Estonian	0.43%
Swedish	0.38%
Persian	0.35%
English	0.30%

Pirkanmaa is a rather linguistically homogeneous region: in 2018, almost 490,000 people, or about 95 per cent of the county's population, spoke Finnish as their mother tongue. For Finno-speakers, the national population share of Pirkanmaa was 10.1 per cent. In the 2010s, the number of Finnish-speakers has increased only in Uusimaa, Pirkanmaa and Northern Ostrobothnia, and slightly in Southwest Finland and Åland.

The Swedish-speaking settlement in Finland in the Middle Ages did not extend to the area of present-day Pirkanmaa, so the number and share of Finland Swedes in the province is relatively small today. In 2018, about two thousand people spoke Swedish as their mother tongue in Pirkanmaa. In 2017, 27 people spoke Sámi as their mother tongue in Pirkanmaa. The second most spoken language in Pirkanmaa is Russian—in 2018 it was used by four thousand people as their mother tongue.

== Regional council ==
The regional council is the main governing body for region and focuses primarily on urban planning. Like all regional councils, it is mandated by law.

== Politics ==
For parliamentary elections, the region of Pirkanmaa forms a single constituency, Pirkanmaa. As of 2023, the constituency elects 20 of the 200 members of the Parliament of Finland.

== See also ==
- Birkarls
- Finnish national road 12
- Kokemäki River
- Lake Längelmävesi
- Lake Näsijärvi
- Pirkanmaa Constituency
- Tampere metropolitan area
