= Kokemäenjoki =

River in southwestern Finland

Coordinates: 61°33′N 21°42′E

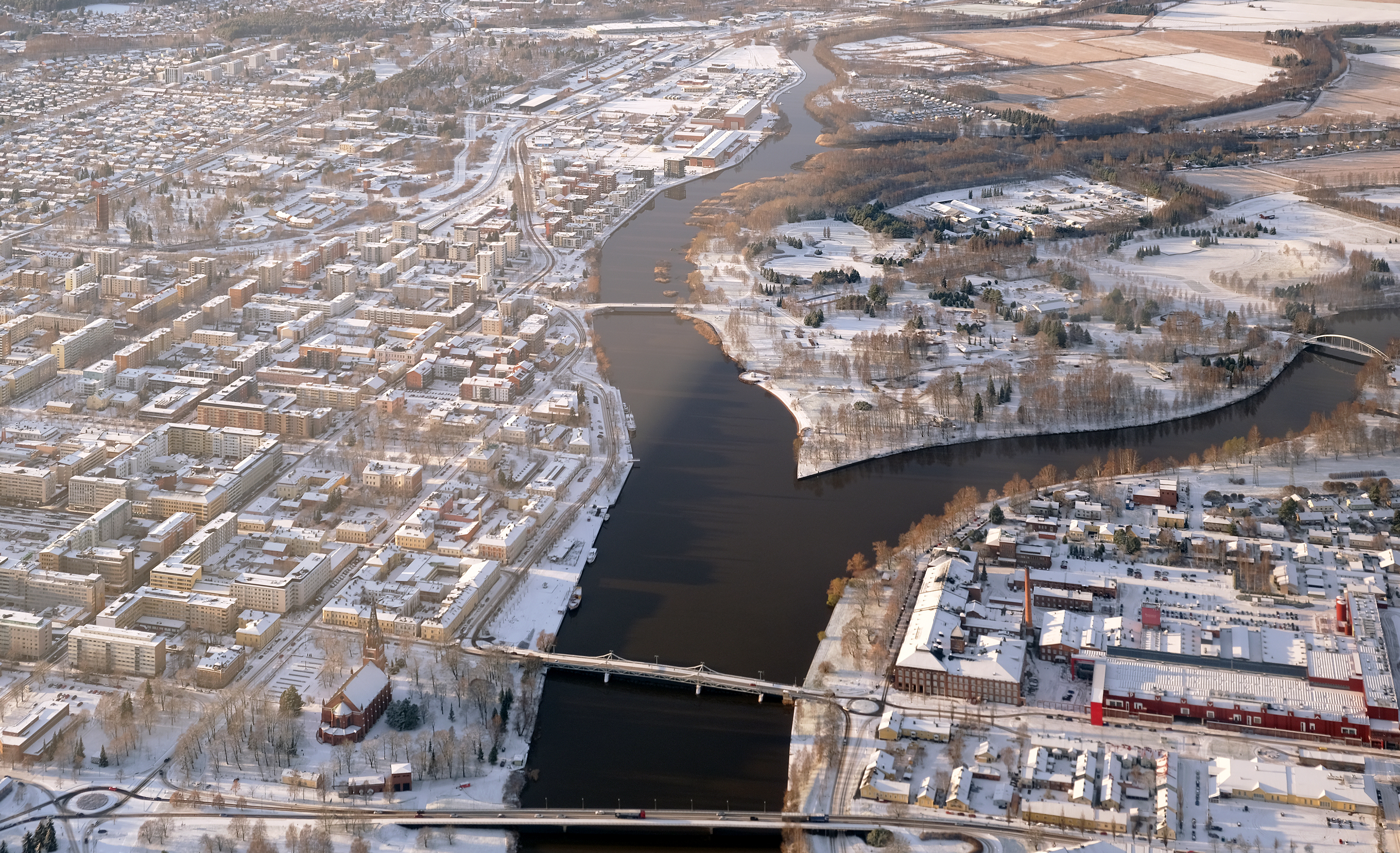
Kokemäenjoki river flows through Pori, Satakunta region.

The Kokemäenjoki (Finnish: [ˈkokemæe̯nˌjoki]) ("Kokemäki River", Swedish: Kumo älv) is a river in southwestern Finland.

== Geography ==
The river originates at Lake Liekovesi in the Pirkanmaa region, and flows 121 kilometres (75 mi) to the Gulf of Bothnia at Pori in the Satakunta region. Primary tributaries of the Kokemäenjoki are the Loimijoki, Kauvatsanjoki and Harjunpäänjoki rivers. The Kokemäenjoki river delta is the largest river delta in the Nordic countries and an important wildlife area.

In May 2025, millions of young fish were released into the river as part of a major spring stocking effort. This included the release of 14,000 two-year-old Atlantic salmon, 18,000 two-year-old sea trout and more than six million newly hatched migratory whitefish from the Harjavalta hatchery.

== See also ==
- Kokemäki Castle
- Kyrösjärvi
- Kulovesi
- Längelmävesi
- Rautavesi (Sastamala)
- Index: Kokemäenjoki basin
- List of rivers of Finland
