= Minna Palmroth =

Finnish professor in computational space physics

- Born: 10 May 1975 (age 51); Sahalahti, Finland
- Education: University of Helsinki
- Occupation: Space physicist

Minna Palmroth (born 10 May 1975) is a professor in computational space physics at the University of Helsinki; her particular area of interest is magnetospheric physics and solar wind - magnetosphere interactions.

== Life ==
Palmroth is from Sahalahti, a small village in the former municipality by the same name near the city of Tampere, Finland.

Palmroth graduated high school from Kangasala High School and completed her master's degree in physics from the University of Helsinki in 1999. She received her doctorate in philosophy majoring in physics in 2003. Palmroth completed her doctoral thesis in English about: Solar wind: magnetosphere interaction as determined by observations and a global MHD Simulation dealt with the interaction of the solar wind (the jet of particles originating from the sun) with the Earth with the magnetosphere based on observational data and a global magnetohydrodynamic simulation.

At the Finnish Meteorological Institute from 2011 to 2016 she led the Earth observation research team, and from 2013 to 2016, she was a space researcher there. Since the beginning of 2017, he has been a professor of space physics at the University of Helsinki. During the years 2018–2025, she will direct the Finnish Center of Excellence for Sustainable Space Science and Technology.

She has studied the need to address the tons of "space junk" that currently orbits the Earth.

== Honors and distinctions ==
Palmroth received the Väisälä prize in 2016. Since 2018, she has been a member of the Finnish Academy of Sciences and Letters. Palmroth is also a member of the Academy of Technical Sciences. In 2021, she was also invited to become a member of the Finnish Science Society. In 2022, she was awarded the JV Snellman Award. In 2022, she was invited to become a member of the Academia Europæa. In February 2023, Palmroth was awarded the Copernicus Medal for her pioneering work on the space environment simulator Vlasiator and her achievements in advancing space physics.
