= Sahalahti =

Sahalahti may refer to:

- Sahalahti (former municipality), Finland
- Sahalahti (village), Finland
