= Southeast Pirkanmaa =

- Former sub-region
- Country: Finland
- Region: Pirkanmaa
- Time zone: UTC+2 (EET)
  - Summer (DST): UTC+3 (EEST)

Southeast Pirkanmaa was a sub-region of the Pirkanmaa Region and one of the sub-regions of Finland. The sub-region ceased to exist in 2011 and it included two municipalities upon its dissolution on 1 January 2011, having started with four municipalities.

== Municipalities ==
Vaakuna	Kunta
Kuhmalahden vaakuna	Kuhmalahti
Pälkäneen vaakuna	Pälkäne
	Sahalahti
	Luopioinen
