= Armfelt =

Swedish noble families

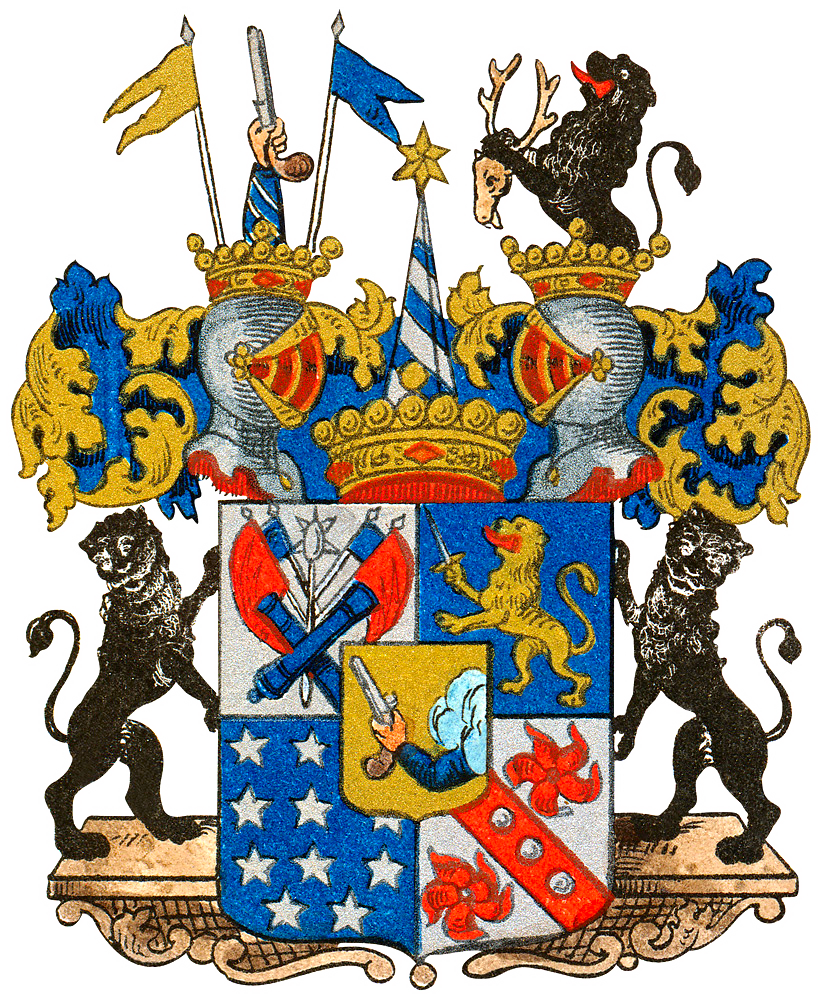
Armfelt family coat of arms

The Armfelt family (also Armfeldt) is a Swedish, Finnish and a Russian noble family. Members of this family were awarded with the title of Baron and Count in Sweden. There were two lines of the family, one living in Sweden, which died out in 1868 and the other one in Finland, that in 1952 has regained the right of representation at Sweden's Knighthood.

== Estates ==
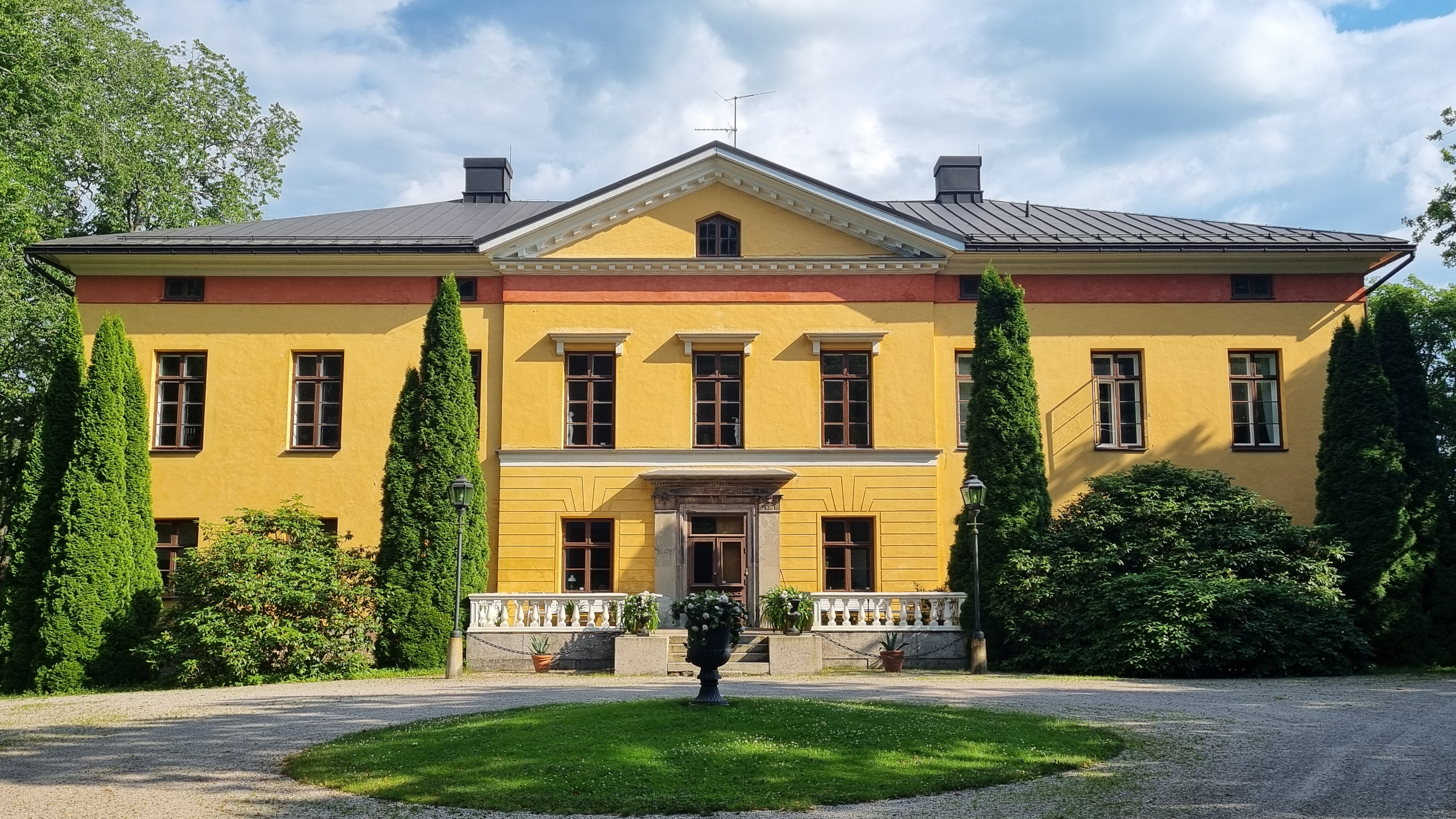
Wiurila Mansion. Architect Charles (Carlo) Bassi.

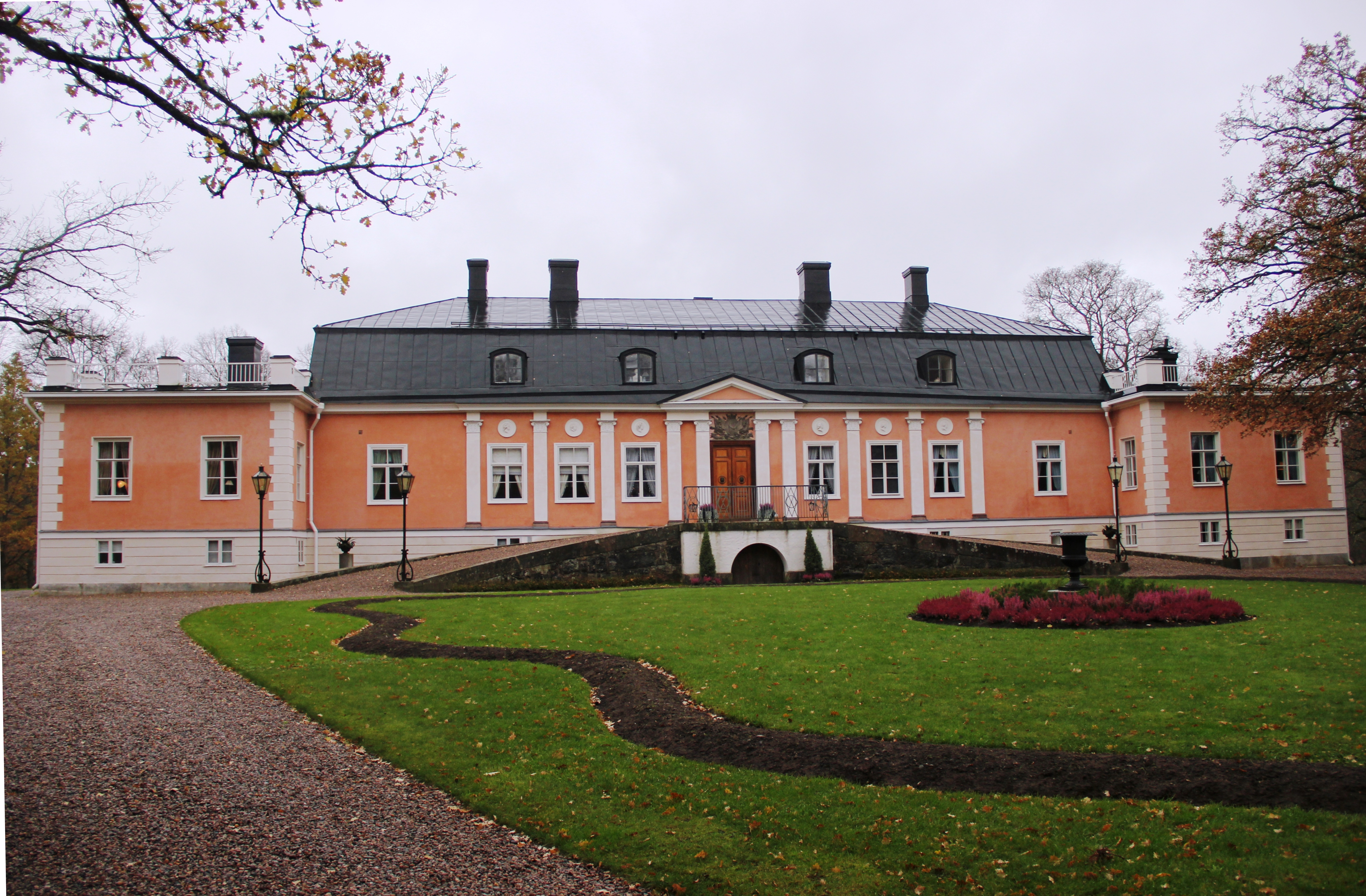
Joensuu Manor was the home of Count Gustaf Mauritz Armfelt.

The Armfelt family owned three large estates in Halikko, Salo: Wiurila Mansion, Vuorentaka Estate, and Joensuu Manor. Wiurila and Vuorentaka are owned by descendants of the family, while Joensuu was bought by Finnish banker Björn Wahlroos.

== Notable members ==
- Carl Gustaf Armfeldt (1666-1736), Swedish baron, general
- Claes Armfelt (1709-1769, Swedish baron, lieutenant colonel
- Carl Gustaf Armfelt (1724-1792), Swedish baron, major general
- Magnus Wilhelm Armfelt (1725-1795), Swedish baron, major general
- Gustaf Mauritz Armfelt (1757–1814), Finnish count, general, courtier and diplomat
- August Philip Armfelt (1768-1839), Finnish baron, owner of Wiurila Manor, chamberlain in the Russian imperial court
- Alexander Armfelt (1794-1876), Finnish count, Minister–Secretary of State for Finland
- Gustaf Magnus Armfelt (1792-1856), Finnish count, lieutenant general, governor, senator
- Carl Magnus Vilhelm Armfelt (1797–1878), Finnish count, major general
- Gustaf Vilhelm Arthur Armfelt (1821–1880), Finnish count, major general
- Alexander Johan Fredrik Armfelt (1826–1898), Finnish rear admiral
- August Magnus Gustaf Armfelt (1826–1894), Finnish count, chamberlain in the Russian imperial court
- Mauritz Wladimir Armfelt (1827–1888), Finnish count, active state councillor and equerry in the Russian imperial court
- Gustaf Johan Philip Armfelt (1830–1880), Finnish baron, author
- Carl Magnus Mauritz Armfelt 1836–1890), Finnish count, industrialist, philanthropist
- Carl Alexander Armfelt (1850–1925), Finnish count, chamberlain and hofmeister in the Russian imperial court
- Alexander Armfelt (1862–1941), Finnish count, chamberlain and active state councillor in the Russian imperial court
- Carl August Reinhold Lars Armfelt (1862–1942), Finnish count, owner of the Wiurila Manor
- Carl Eugen Armfelt (1863–1908), Finnish count, architect
- Alexandra Zheleznova-Armfelt (1870–1933), Gustaf's granddaughter, a composer and collector of Russian folk music.
- Karl Gustaf Hjalmar Armfelt (1873–1959), Finnish goldsmith
- Carl Armfelt (b. 1956), Finnish composer

== See also ==
- The National Biography of Finland
- Swedish-speaking Finns
