= Pohja, Kangasala =

Pohja
- Village
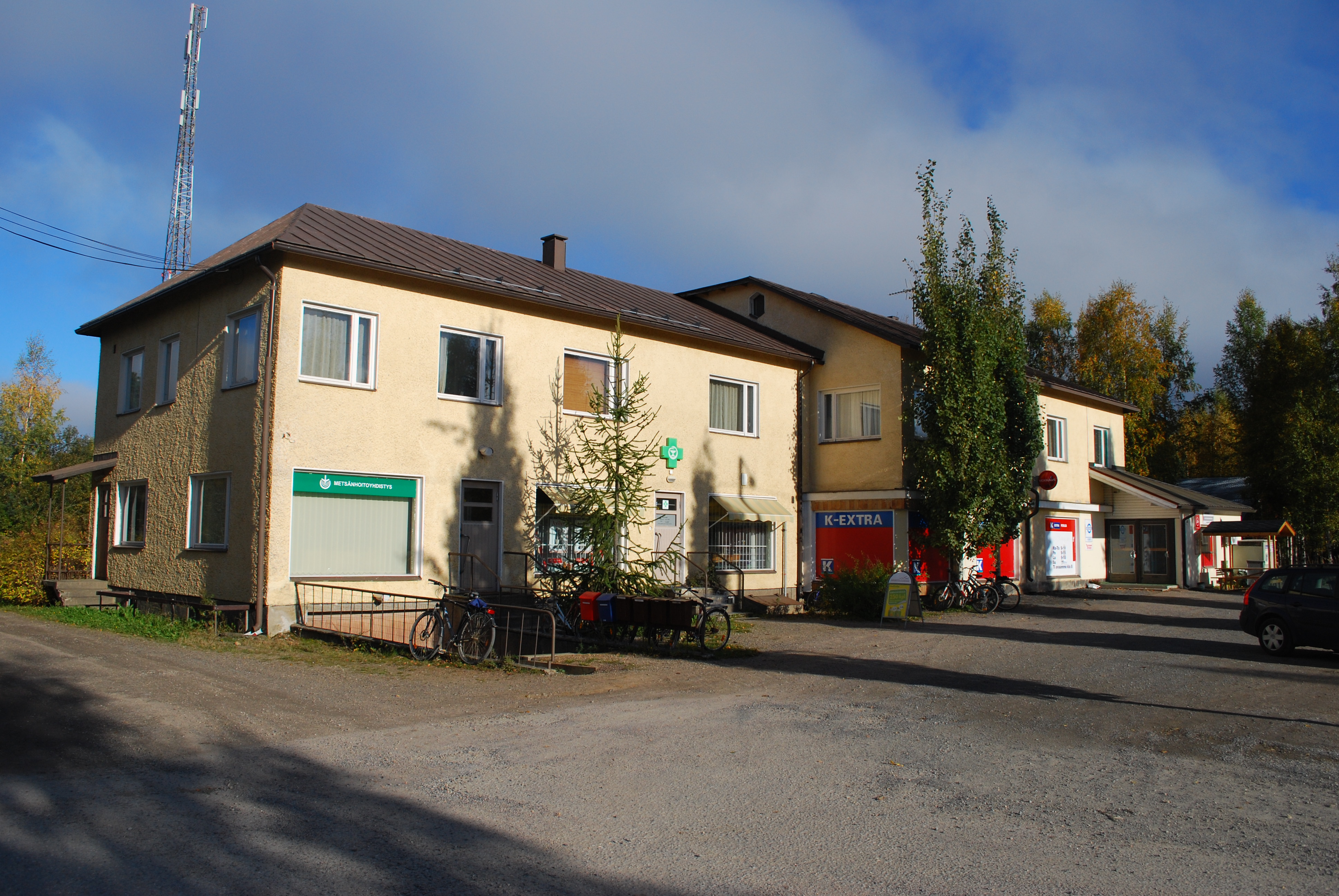
- Stores in the village centre in 2010.

- Location in Finland
- Coordinates: 61°28′53.05″N 24°42′12.01″E
- Country: Finland
- Region: Pirkanmaa
- Municipality: Kangasala
- Time zone: UTC+2 (EET)
  - Summer (DST): UTC+3 (EEST)
- Postal code: 36840

Pohja is a village in the eastern part of the Kangasala town and former administrative center of the former Kuhmalahti municipality in Pirkanmaa, Finland. The village was established in the Middle Ages, but the first written mention of it is in a land register from 1543.

The village has a Kuhmalahti library and post office. The village is also home to a Pentecostal church founded in 1947.

== See also ==
- Finnish regional road 325
