= Finnish regional road 325 =

Road in Finland

Regional Road 325
- Yhdystie 325 (Finnish); Förbindelseväg 325 (Swedish)
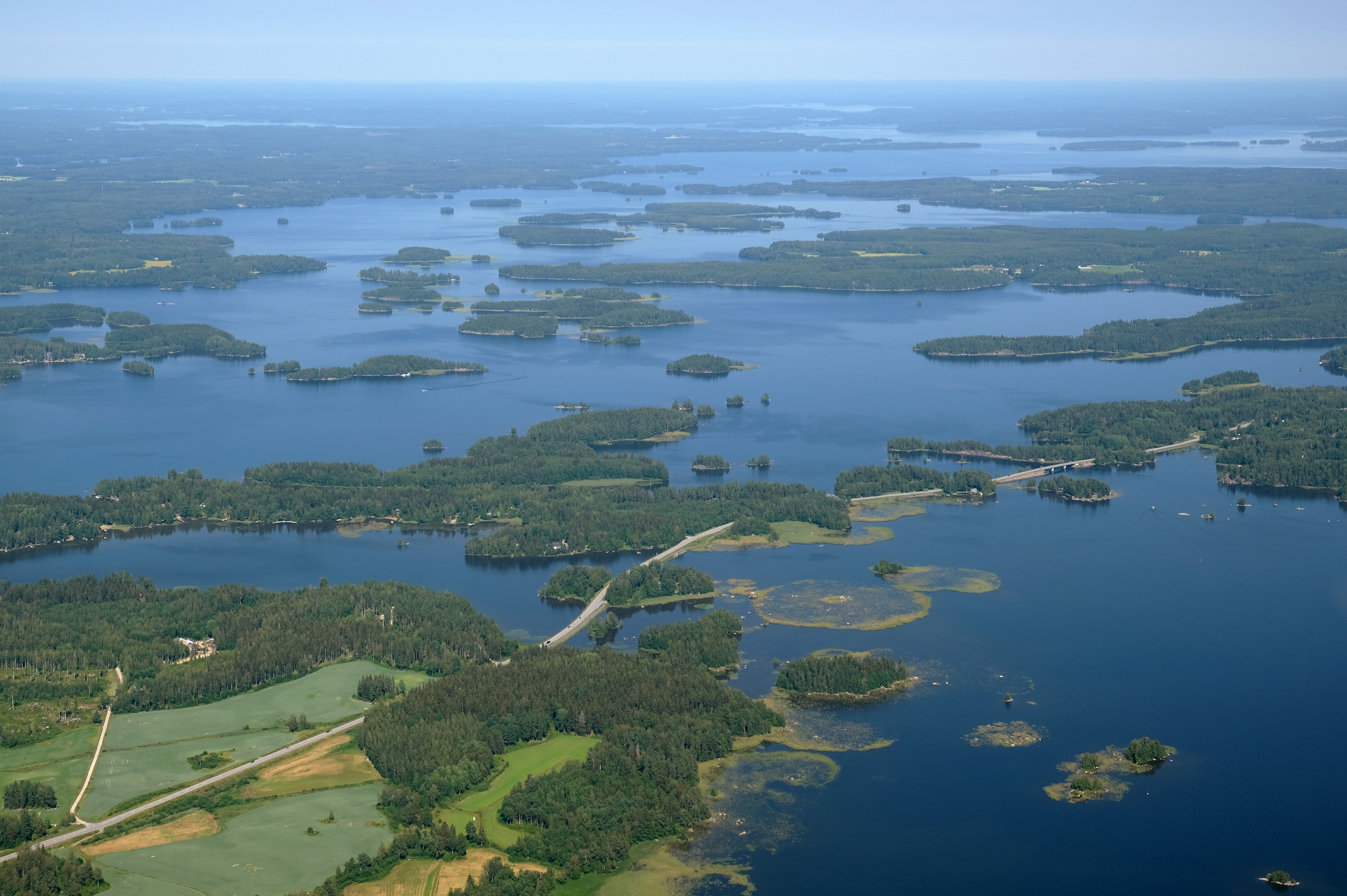

Route information
- Length: 60 km (37 mi)

Major junctions
- From: Huutijärvi, Kangasala
- To: Poikkijärvi, Kuhmoinen

Location
- Country: Finland

Highway system
- Highways in Finland

Finnish regional road 325 (Finnish: Seututie 325, Swedish: Regionalväg 325) is the road in Pirkanmaa, Finland. At the western end it starts in the village of Huutijärvi in Kangasala and at the eastern end in the village of Poikkijärvi in Kuhmoinen, thus connecting highways 12, 58 and 24.

In 2020, the busiest section of the road was its initial section from Huutijärvi to Sahalahti. The average daily traffic (ADT) on the section was 4,200 vehicles per day. Traffic between Sahalahti and Pohja was 1,400–2,200 vehicles per day. The quietest section of the road was east of Pohja. Traffic between Pohja and Poikkijärvi was 500–700 vehicles per day.

== Route ==
- Kangasala
  - Huutijärvi
  - Sahalahti
  - Kuhmalahti
  - Pohja
  - Vehkajärvi
- Kuhmoinen
  - Sappee
  - Poikkijärvi

== See also ==
- Suomenselkätie
