= Thelning =

Thelning is a Scandinavian surname. Notable people with the surname include:

- Åke Thelning (1892–1979), Swedish Army officer and horse rider
- Emanuel Thelning (1767–1831), Swedish-born, Finnish painter
