= Kangasala railway station =

Former railway station in Kangasala, Finland

Kangasala
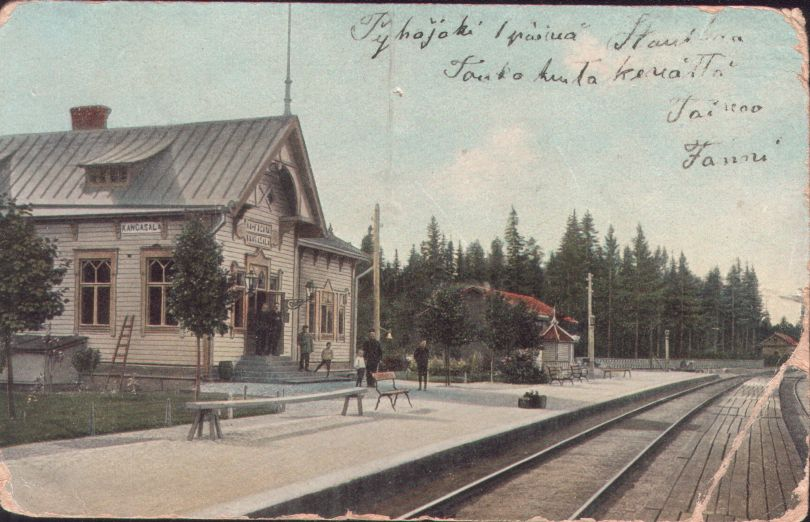

General information
- Location: Asema, Kangasala; Finland
- Coordinates: 61°29′54″N 023°59′29″E
- System: Closed VR station
- Operator: VR Group
- Line: Tampere–Haapamäki

Construction
- Architect: Bruno Granholm
- Architectural style: National Romantic

Other information
- Station code: Kg

History
- Opened: 15 November 1898
- Closed: 23 May 1993
Location

The Kangasala railway station (Finnish: Kangasalan rautatieasema, Swedish: Kangasala järnvägsstation) is a closed station located in the town of Kangasala, Finland, in the district and village of Asema. It was located along the Tampere–Haapamäki railway, and its nearest open stations are Tampere in the southwest and Orivesi in the northeast.

== History ==
=== Halimaa ===
The project of the old Ostrobothnian railway from Tampere to Vaasa via Haapamäki and Seinäjoki was initiated during the end of the 1870s. During the planning stages of the line, a dominant question was whether it should be built around the western or eastern side of lake Näsijärvi. The eastern option was settled on, making it cut through the municipality and parish of Kangasala through its northern side, some 5 kilometres (3.1 mi) away from the parish village. The construction of the railway was initiated in 1879, completed in 1882, and it was opened for traffic in 1883. On the territory of Kangasala were the villages and stations of Suinula and Siitama, further away from the municipal church to the north, with the former most commonly being used by travellers bound for the surroundings of the church. The Halimaa halt was opened in 1888 to serve the parish village, being placed about 5 kilometres (3.1 mi) further towards Tampere compared to Suinula. A post office was opened at the halt on 1 June 1895.

Halinmaa quickly became a busy halt, even overtaking the full fledged station of Suinula in this aspect. After arriving in Halinmaa, travellers could continue to the Kangasala parish village by stagecoach. Demands began to arise to upgrade it to the status of a station, culminating in the municipality making an official proposal in 1895, which was accepted. The station, now called Kangasala after its parent municipality and the village it was meant to serve, was placed approximately 1 kilometre (0.62 mi) further south along the line than Halinmaa was. Not only did the change bring the station closer to the parish village, but the former location of the halt on a hill surrounded by bedrock was also seen as problematic in terms of future land use.

=== Kangasala ===
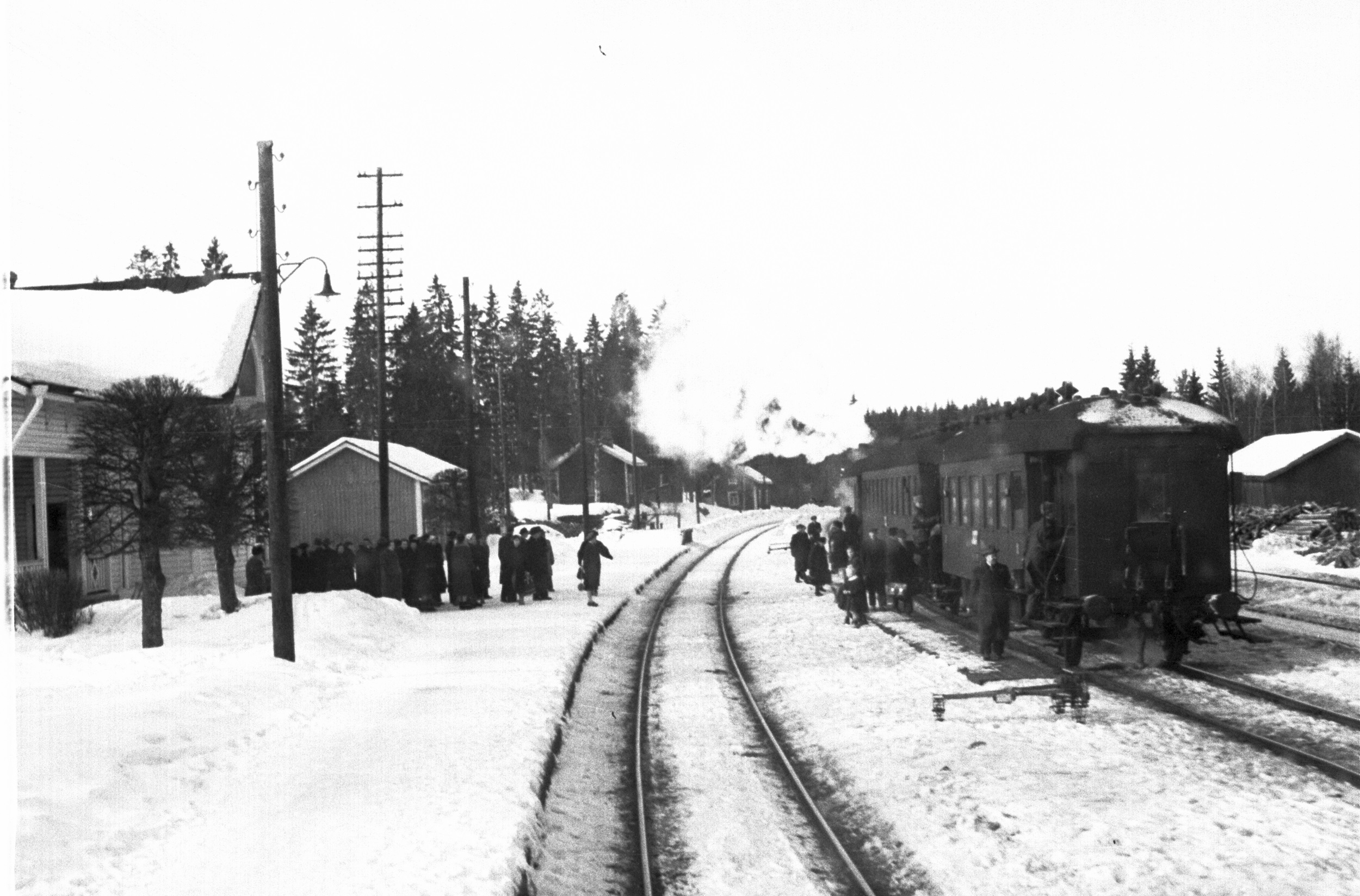
Kangasala in the 1950s

Upon the foundation of the station, a village began to form around in the mostly uninhabitated area. Some industry developed as well; the Halimaa sawmill was founded in the 1920s, operating for about 30 years. Passenger numbers at Kangasala grew quickly over its first two decades: 16,098 in 1900, 19,079 in 1905, 26,569 in 1910, and 36,512 in 1920. At first, the railyard had four switches, the number of which later expanded to six, and at its fullest extent, approximately 1.3 kilometres (0.81 mi) of track.

Shortly after the establishment of the station, the possibility of building a railway between Tampere and Lahti was considered. It was planned that the line would diverge from the Ostrobothnian line in either Vatiala (8.5 kilometres (5.3 mi) to the east from Tampere) or Kangasala (12.4 kilometres (7.7 mi) from Tampere). The plan also included a station in the parish village of Kangasala, as well as a halt in Kaivanto. The municipality pledged to finance the project with a share of 15,000 markka. The plan was met with resistance by the city of Hämeenlinna as it was advocating for a competing plan for a railway connecting it with Jyväskylä, but neither line was ever built.

=== Decline and closure ===
In the 1920s, bus transport was quickly developing in Finland, and it started to become the dominating method of public local transportation. The effects were felt in Kangasala as well, due to the inconvenient location of the railway and its stations compared to the center of the municipality. The station was downgraded to the status of a pysäkki in 1964. The final stationmaster of Kangasala, Kalervo Niinimäki, ended his work on 27 May 1972, and the station was officially made unstaffed in 1977 due to the closure of freight services at the station. The rail yard was dismantled in 1990, effectively making Kangasala a halt, and trains stopped calling there on 23 May 1993. The closure was meant to happen earlier on in the year, but was postponed seemingly by accident due to an error in the timetable planning.

== Architecture ==
The Kangasala station building was constructed in 1898. It was designed by Bruno Granholm, and is representative of the National Romantic style; unlike the vast majority of other smaller stations at the time, it was built using specifically designed blueprints, instead of stock ones. The station's premises also included a residential building, as well as several other buildings related to the living quarters. The station building was expanded in 1922 with an additional wing for a waiting room that also included a large porch. Some of the ornamental details of the design were also simplified around this time.
