= Alexandra Zheleznova-Armfelt =

Finnish–Russian composer (1866–1933)

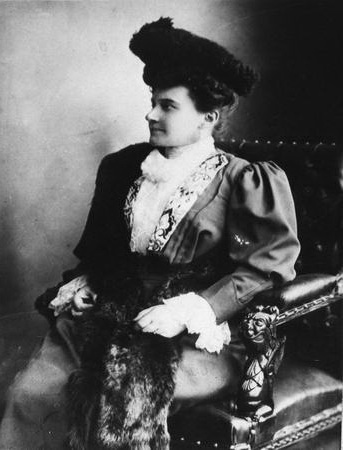
Mrs. Zheleznova née Armfelt ca. 1900

Alexandra Vladimirovna Zheleznova (Russian: Александра Владимировна Железнова; born Alexandrine Armfelt; 16 September 1866 – 6 March 1933) was a Finnish-Russian composer.

== Biography ==
Born Countess Alexandrine Armfelt into a Finnish noble family in Turku, Grand Duchy of Finland, great granddaughter of Count Gustaf Mauritz Armfelt, she received a broad education as a child and started to compose at an early age. Her first work was published in 1894. She was a member of the circle surrounding Anton Rubinstein and Mily Balakirev.

In 1895, she married Vladimir Zheleznov, a St. Petersburg-born officer of Ural Cossack descent. She stayed with her husband as he was posted in the Ural District in 1896–1897 and developed an interest in Russian folk music, and together with her husband published a collection of Cossack songs (Пѣсни уральских казаков) in 1899. Her most productive period was 1903–1914, based in St. Petersburg, during which she published a number of romances for cello, violin and piano. She divorced her husband in 1912.

During World War I and the Russian Revolution, she lost her former husband and her sons. After 1917, she became a pianist in the cinema and gave piano lessons. She died in Leningrad.

Her daughter Xenia (Russian: Ксения Железнова-Осечкина), and grandson Vsevolod Osechkin (Russian: Всеволод Осечкин), restored and published much of the composer's legacy.

== Sources ==
- Carpelan, Tor: Ättartavlor för de på Finlands riddarhus inskrivna ätterna, vol. 1, A–G, p. 61. Helsingfors 1954.
- Rukopolev, Vsevolod & Öhrström, Eva: Alexandra Zheleznova-Armfelt: Rysk tonsättarinna med rötter i Sverige
- "The manuscripts didn't burn" – article in Moskvichka magazine (2008).
