= Gustaf Magnus Armfelt =

Finnish-Swedish-Russian courtier

Lieutenant General Count Gustaf Magnus Armfelt
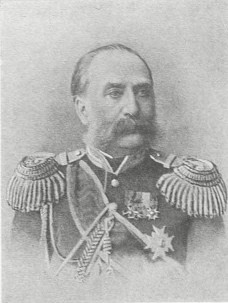
- Armfelt in generals uniform ca. 1850.
- Born: 2 April 1792; Helsinki, Sweden
- Died: 10 October 1856 (aged 64); Helsinki, Finland, Russian Empire
- Burial place: Halikko Church
- Military career
- Allegiance: Sweden; Russian Empire
- Branch: Swedish Army; Russian Army
- Service years: 1809–1830
- Rank: Lieutenant General
- Unit: Life Guards
- Conflicts: Napoleonic Wars

Gustaf Magnus Armfelt (Russian: Густав Густавович Армфельт, romanized: Gustav Gustavovich Armfelt; April 2, 1792 – July 8, 1856) was a Swedish-Finnish-Russian lieutenant general, governor, count, chamberlain, and statesman.

== Biography ==
Armfelt's parents were General, Count Gustaf Mauritz Armfelt (1757–1814) and Countess Hedvig Ulrika De la Gardie (1761–1832). He attended a military school in Berlin and in 1809 he became a cornet of the Life Guards of Horse of the Swedish army. However, Armfelt resigned from the Swedish army, moved to Finland, and in 1811 entered the service of the Russian imperial army as a second lieutenant. From 1812 he served in the 3rd Finnish Jaeger Regiment and participated in the war against Napoleon from 1812 to 1815. Armfelt became a lieutenant in 1812 and captain in 1814. He resigned from service in 1816 as a lieutenant colonel, but returned to the army as early as 1817. Armfelt served from 1817 to 1819. On the staff of the Vyborg battalion of the Finnish Jaeger Regiment and then in 1819–1820 as the first adjutant of the Finnish Corps Division of the Headquarters of the Finnish Division and as an adjutant of the Emperor. He was then 1st Commander of the Finnish Infantry Regiment 1820–1827 and 1st Commander of the Finnish sharpshooter brigade from 1827 to 1830 until the disbandment of the Finnish Army. Armfelt was promoted to colonel in 1819 and major general in 1828. He resigned from the army service as a true state councilor in 1830.

Armfelt was governor of Vaasa Province from 1830 to 1832 and governor of Uusimaa Province (from 1838 as governor) from 1832 to 1847. He received the rank of chamberlain of the imperial court in 1831 and was promoted to lieutenant general in 1834. Armfelt was last a member of the Senate's finance department from 1847 to 1853 and inspector of the Finnish sharpshooter battalions in 1854–1855. Until 1852, he owned Elimo Manor in Pohjan parish and then Käpylä Manor in Helsinki.

Armfelt was married from 1819 to Englishwoman Louise Cuthbert-Brooke (1801–1865) whose father was Colonel Thomas Brooke of the British Army. Their son was Major General Gustaf Wilhelm Artur Armfelt (1821–1880).

== Gallery ==
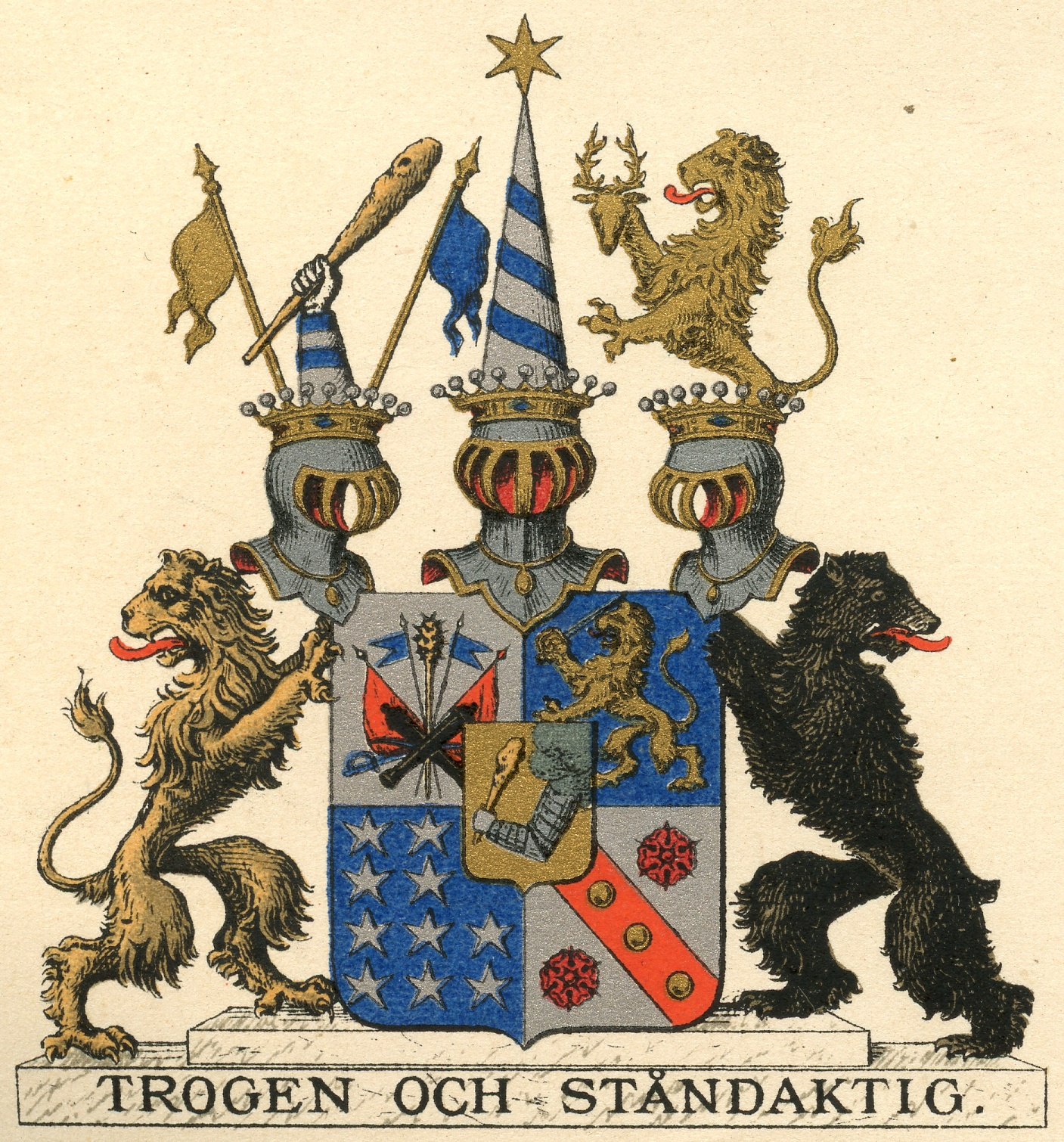
Coat of Arms of the Counts of Armfelt

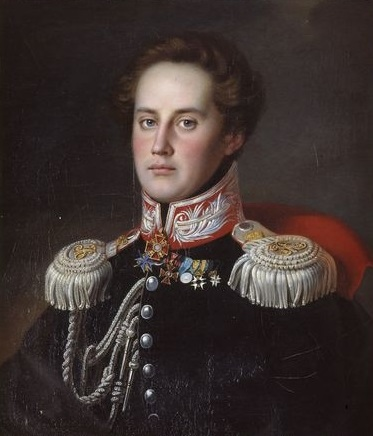
Colonel Gustaf Magnus Armfelt c. 1819

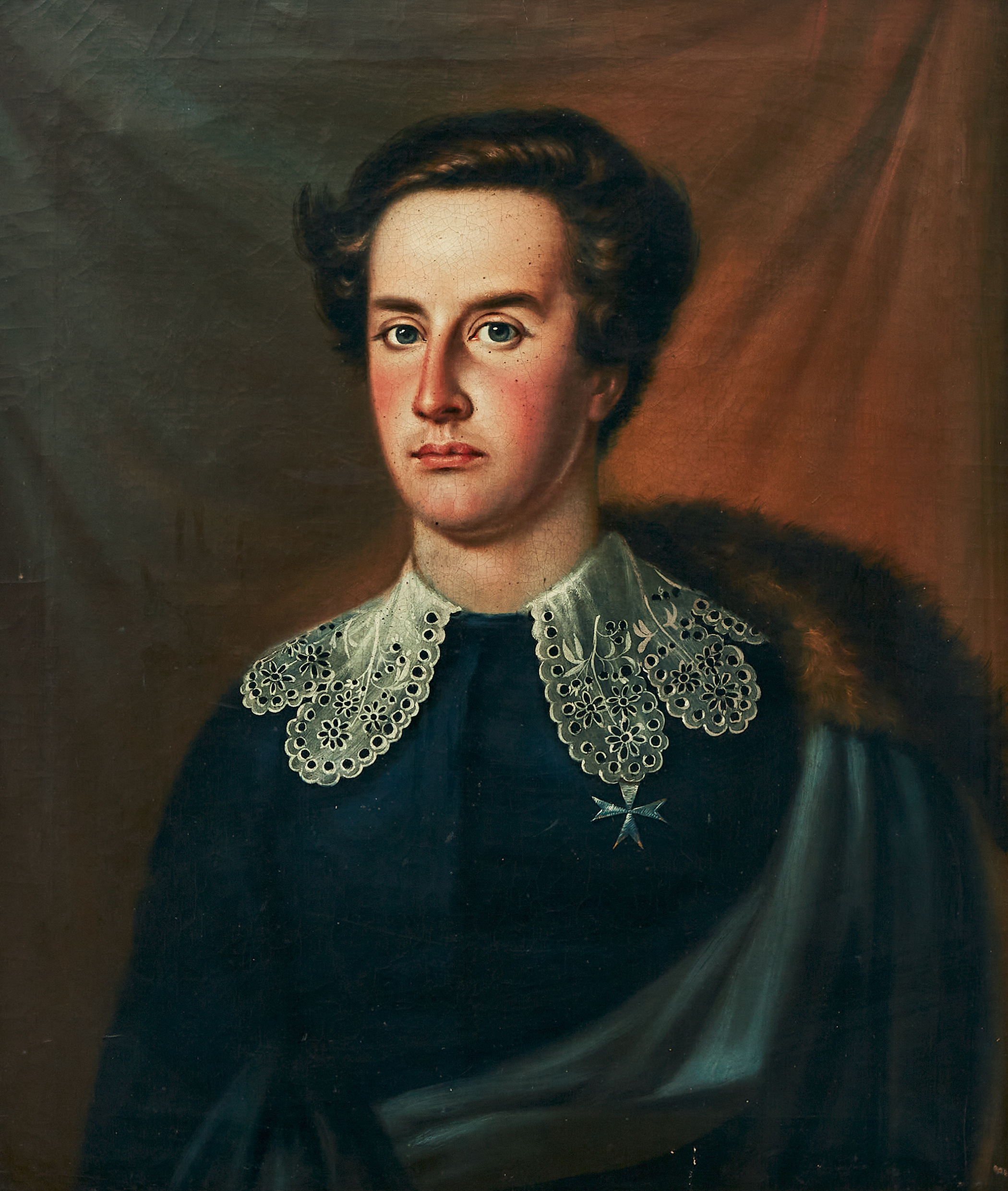
Gustaf Mauritz Armfelt, c. 1825

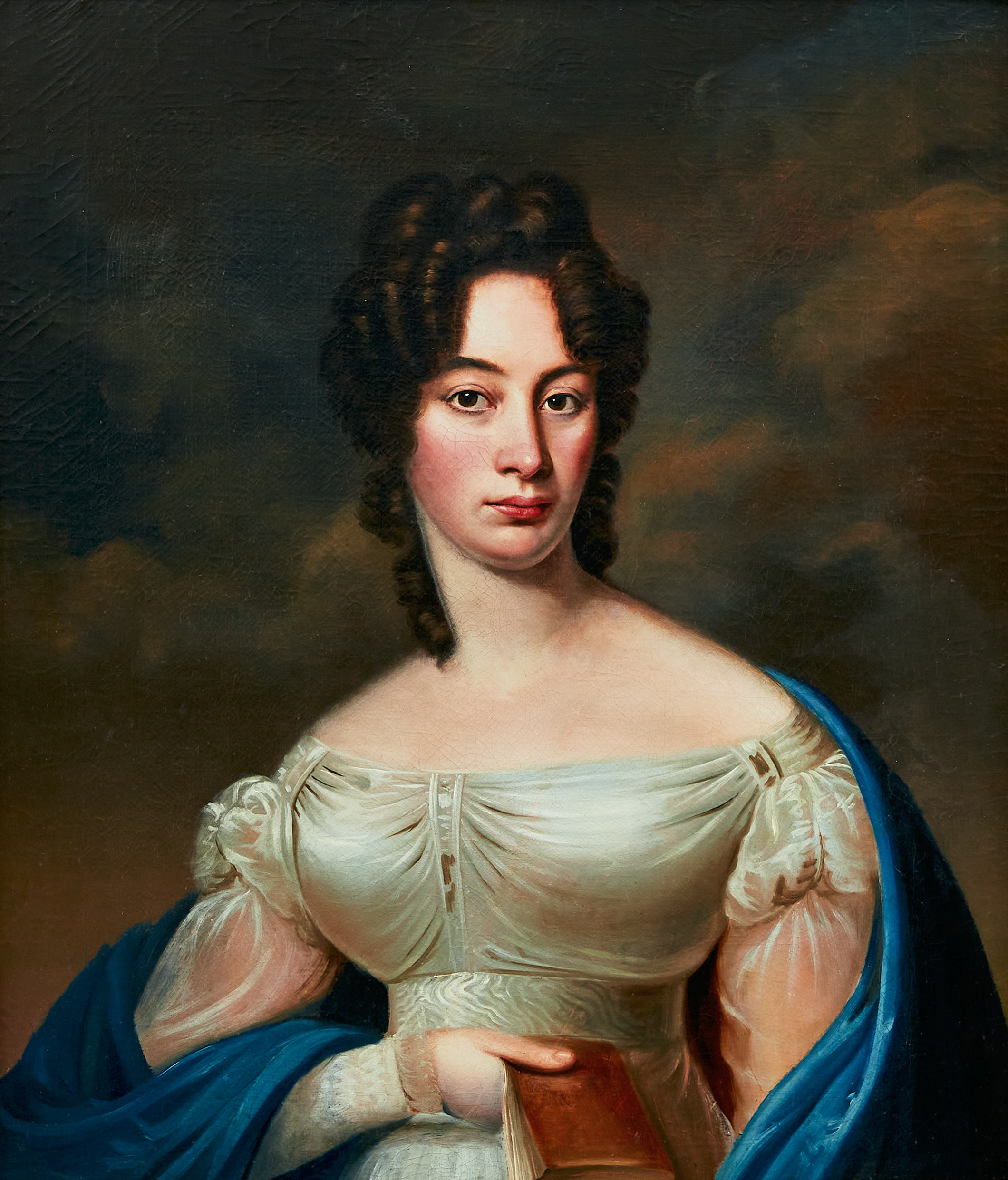
Louise Cuthbert Armfelt, his wife, c. 1825

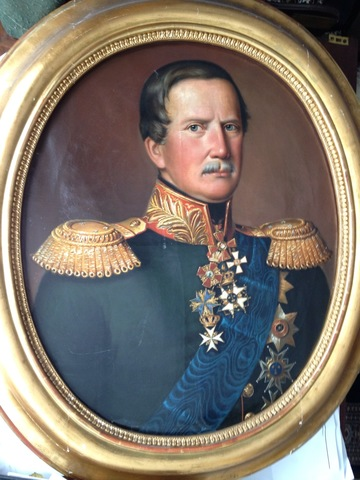
General Lieutenant Gustaf Magnus Armfelt c. 1847

== Honours ==
- (Kingdom of Prussia) Recipient of the Pour le Mérite, 1814.
- (Sovereign Military Order of Malta) Knight of the Order of Malta, latest 1819.
- (Russian Empire) Knight of the Order of St. Stanislaus, 1st Class, 1833.
- (Russian Empire) Knight of the Order of St. Anna, 1st Class, 1836.
- (Russian Empire) Knight of the Order of St. Vladimir, 2nd Class, 1843.
- (Russian Empire) Knight of the Order of St. George, 4th Class, 1843.
- (Sweden) Grand Cross of the Order of the Sword, 1847.
- (Russian Empire) Knight of the Order of the White Eagle, 1850.

== See also ==
- Gustaf Mauritz Armfelt
- Armfelt
- Magnus Brahe
- Stanislaus von Engeström
