= Kuhmalahti =

- Former municipality
- Kuhmalahden kunta Kuhmalahti kommun
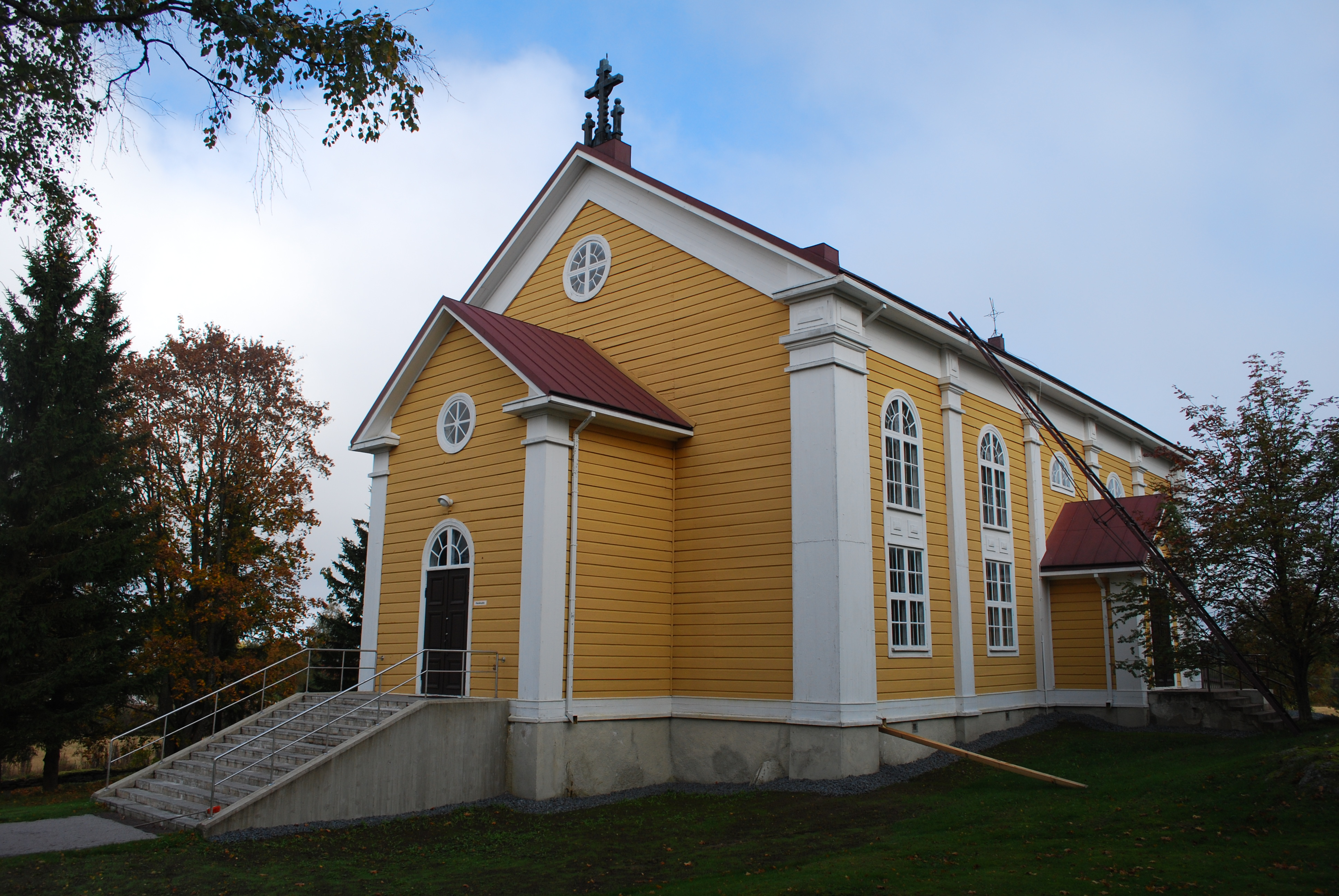
- Church

- Coat of arms

- Location of Kuhmalahti in Finland
- Coordinates: 61°30.3′N 024°34′E
- Country: Finland
- Region: Pirkanmaa
- Sub-region: South Eastern Pirkanmaa
- Charter: 1865
- Consolidated: 2011
- Seat: Pohja

Government
  - Municipal manager: Jarmo Kivineva

Area
  - Total: 220.67 km^{2} (85.20 sq mi)
  - Land: 168.50 km^{2} (65.06 sq mi)
  - Water: 52.17 km^{2} (20.14 sq mi)

Population (2010-10-31)
  - Total: 1,047
  - Density: 6.214/km^{2} (16.09/sq mi)

Population by native language
  - Finnish: 98.9% (official)
  - Swedish: 0.2%
  - Others: 0.9%

Population by age
  - 0 to 14: 14.6%
  - 15 to 64: 62.1%
  - 65 or older: 23.3%
- Time zone: UTC+2 (EET)
  - Summer (DST): UTC+3 (EEST)
- Website: www.kuhmalahti.fi

Kuhmalahti (Swedish: Kuhmalahti, also Kuhmalax) is a former municipality of Finland. It was consolidated with the municipality of Kangasala on January 1, 2011.

It was located in the Pirkanmaa region. The municipality had a population of 1,047 (31 October 2010) and covered a land area of 168.50 square kilometres (65.06 sq mi). The population density was 6.21 inhabitants per square kilometre (16.1/sq mi).

The municipality was unilingually Finnish.

== People born in Kuhmalahti ==
- Kaarina Kari (1888–1982)
- Yrjö Leiwo (1884 – 1964)

== See also ==
- Finnish regional road 325
