= Kaarina Kari =

Finnish physician, teacher and writer (1888–1982)

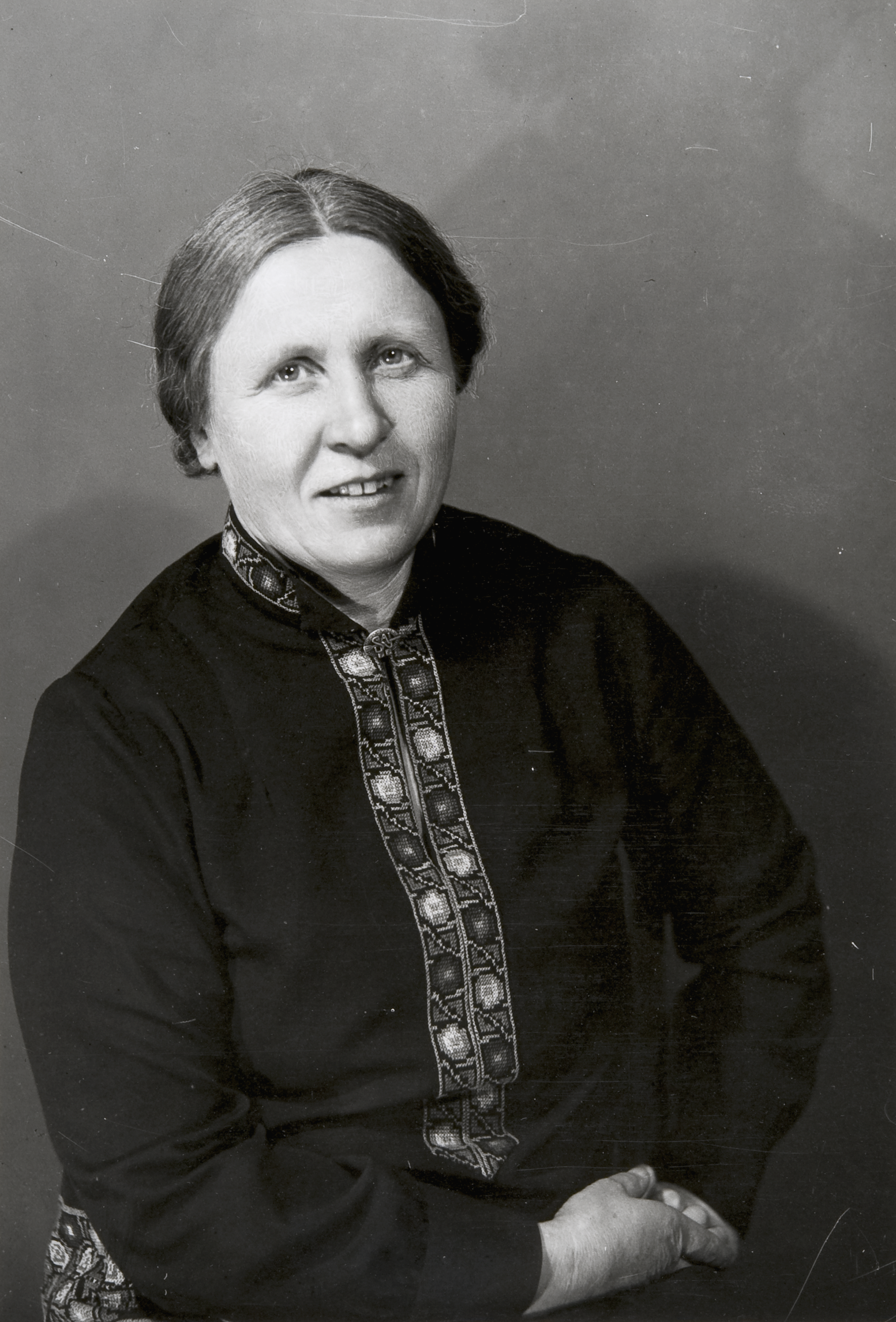
- Kari in 1932
- Born: 17 December 1888; Kuhmalahti, Pirkanmaa, Finland
- Died: 21 March 1982 (aged 93); Helsinki, Finland
- Organization: Finnish Women's Physical Education Association

Kaarina Kari (17 December 1888 – 21 March 1982) was a Finnish physician, gymnastics teacher and writer. She served as president of the Finnish Women's Physical Education Association, led the Finnish women's gymnastics team at the 1936 Summer Olympics and was one of the first pleasure hikers to hike Halti, Finland's highest fell.

== Biography ==
Kari was born in Kuhmalahti, Pirkanmaa, Finland, in 1888. Her father, Kaarlo Gustav Salin, changed his name to Kaarlo Kustaa Kari and worked as a priest.

Kari founded a school in Tampere and in 1908. After moving to Helsinki, she joined the Helsingin Naisvoimistelijat (Helsinki Women Gymnasts) and the Friends of Finnish Folk Dance organisations.

Kari graduated as a licentiate in medicine in 1925, in order to have a better foundation for her gymnastics teaching. She then worked as gymnastics teacher and school doctor at the Finnish Normal Lyceum for Girls in Helsinki. Kari was awarded the title of professor in 1959.

Kari served as president of the Finnish Women's Physical Education Association (Finnish: Suomen naisten lijkuskasvatusliitto (SNLL), now the Finnish Gymnastics Association) from 1921 to 1954, succeeding Anni Collan. She was a member of the Helsinki City Council from 1926 to 1928 and a member of the State Sports Board from 1945 to 1953.

In 1927, Kaarina Kari was on a study trip in Sweden and observed the practice where schoolchildren used their vacation time for guided fell skiing trips. After returning to Finland, Kari organized ski trips for schoolchildren and created the Finnish ski holiday model based on Swedish practice. She wrote to the Ministry of Education's camping board and proposed that railway discounts be granted to school groups for skiing trips. Kari was also the first Finn to start developing gymnastics for the elderly.

At the 1936 Summer Olympics in Berlin, Germany, Kari led the Finnish women's gymnastics team.

Kari, Anna Lehtonen and Inkeri Arajärvi were the first pleasure hikers to hike Halti, Finland's highest fell. She covered the hike in her book The Conquest of Halt (1978). She also published health care textbooks that were used in schools and educational literature on abstinence and against cigarette smoking.

Kari died in 1982 in Helsinki, aged 93.

== Awards ==
- Cross of Merit of the Red Cross of Finland (1941)
- Order of the Cross of Liberty, 4th Class (1942)
- Knight of the Order of the Lion of Finland, First Class (1944)
- Finnish Olympic Cross of Merit, First Class (1952)
- The Great Cross of Merit of Finnish Sports and Culture of Physical Exercise (1954)
