= Bohman =

Bohman is a surname. Notable people with the surname include:

- Gösta Bohman (1911–1997), Swedish politician
- Hanna Bohman, Canadian model and fighter with the Kurdish YPJ militia
- Lennart Bohman (1909–1979), Swedish Olympic boxer
- Luděk Bohman (born 1946), Czech sprinter
- Ludvík Bohman (born 1973), Czech sprinter
- Martin Bohman (born 1980), Czech Olympic bobsledder
- Mikael Bohman (born 1979), Swedish ice hockey goaltender
- Tom Bohman, American mathematician

== Other uses ==
- Bohman & Schwartz, defunct automobile manufacturer in the United States

== See also ==
- Boris Böhmann (born 1964), German conductor and composer
