= Battle of Elgsö =

1789 battle

- Part of the Russo-Swedish War (1788–90)
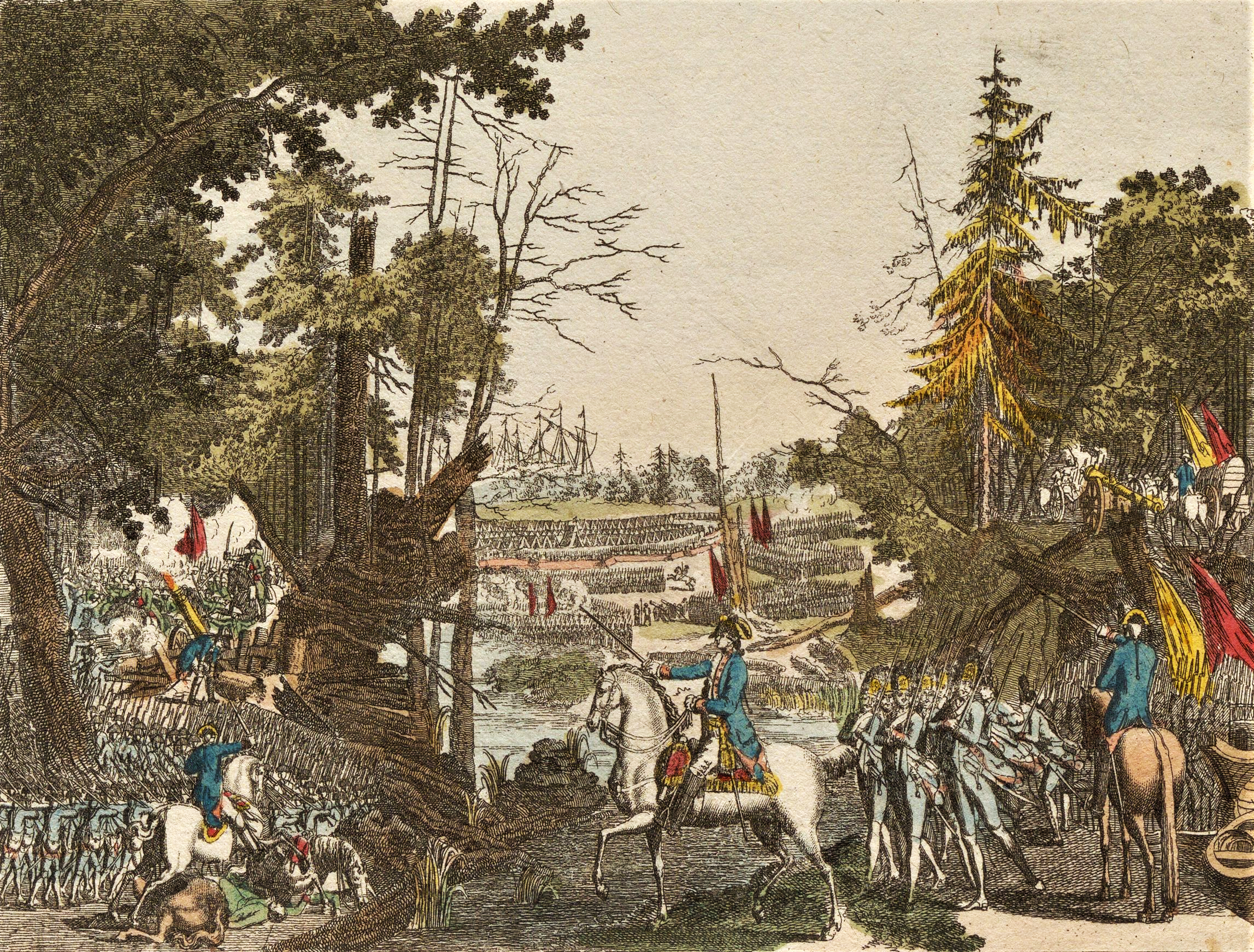
- Battle of Elgsö, as depicted in Nordischer Kriegsschauplaz
Date	September 30, 1789
Location	Elgsö, Barösund, Finland
Result	Swedish victory

Belligerents
Sweden	(Russia) Russian Empire

Commanders and leaders
Gustaf Mauritz Armfelt	James Trevenen

Strength
500 men	440 men

Casualties and losses
60 killed and wounded	200 killed, wounded and captured

The Battle of Elgsö took place on September 30, 1789, during the Russo-Swedish War (1788–1790). Sweden won over the Russian Empire.

In September 1789 a Swedish force under the command of Gustaf Mauritz Armfelt, numbering 4,000 men, was sent towards Barösund where the Swedes and Russians had actively been fighting each other with ships of various sizes. The Russians threatened the Swedes with a landing operation, and Armefelt was supposed to interrupt their plans. On 30 September he launched an attack with 500 men on the Russians stationed at the island of Elgsö, consisting of 10 cannons and 440 men under the general command of James Trevenen. In the battle, the Swedes lost 12 killed and 46 wounded, the Russians had approximately 150 killed and wounded and 52 captured. The Russian field artillery was captured; they had to evacuate the island and no longer posed a great threat to the Swedes.
