= Tom Bohman =

American mathematician

Tom Bohman is an American mathematician who is a former head of the Department of Mathematical Sciences and is a Alexander M. Knaster Professor at Carnegie Mellon University.
