= Emanuel Thelning =

Swedish-born, Finnish painter (1767–1831)

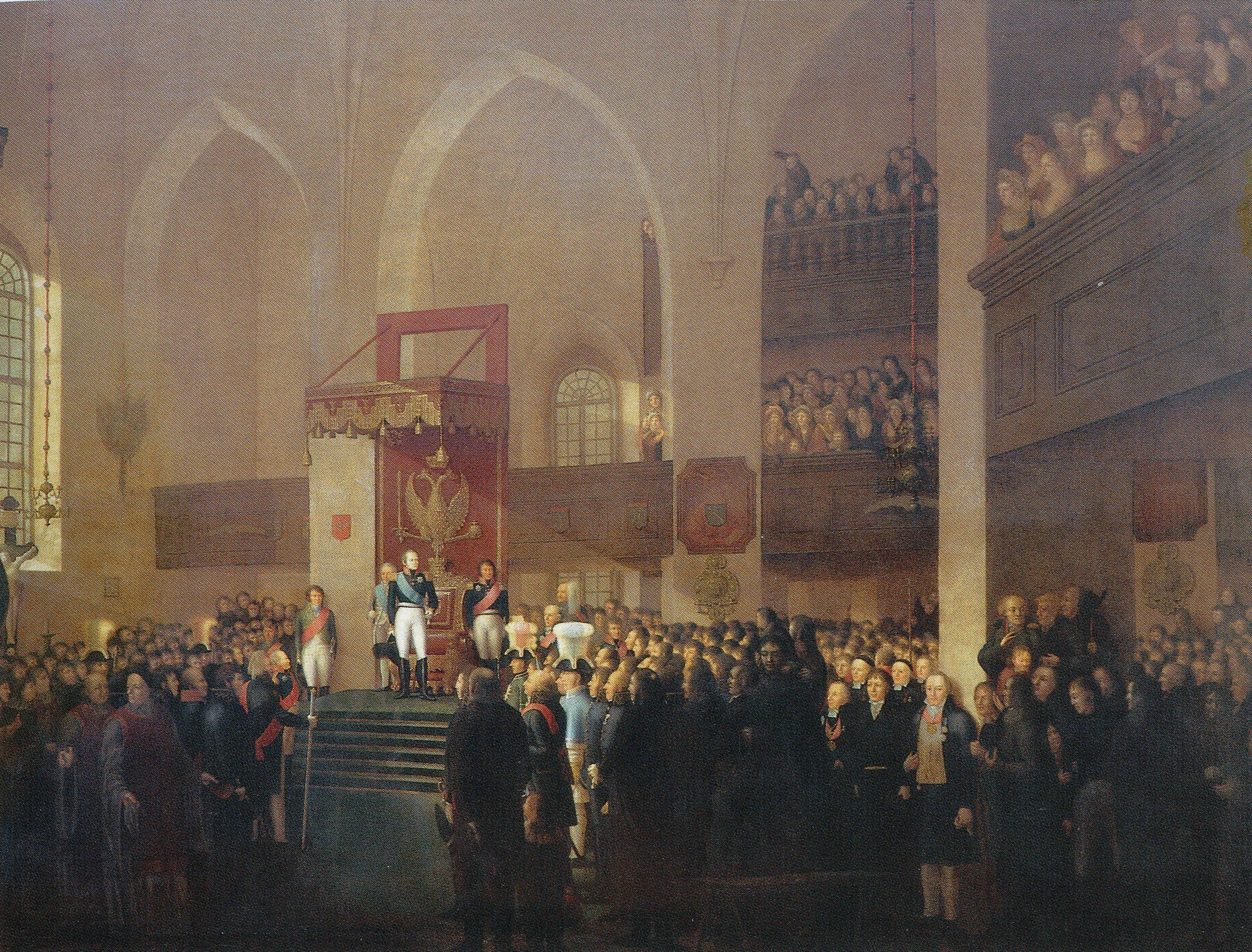
The Opening of the Diet of Porvoo (1812)

Emanuel Thelning (24 January 1767 – 8 May 1831) was a Swedish-born, Finnish painter.

== Biography ==
Thelning was born in Västergötland, and studied at the Royal Swedish Academy of Arts, probably with Carl Gustaf Pilo and Louis Jean Desprez. He moved to Helsinki in 1798 and lived in Laajasalo. He painted religious-themed works and altarpieces for church commissions as well as portraits. He was also earliest portrayers of the local Kangasala landscape. Thelning painted the Vihti church altarpiece (1798), the Diet Balls (1809), and The Opening of the Diet of Porvoo (1812) which is considered to be Thelning's main work. He also painted a portrait of Johan Sederholm, which belongs to the Helsinki City Art Museum's collection. He moved to St. Petersburg in 1820, where the state paid a 600 rubles annual pension for his Diet of Porvoo painting. The piece he did not sell himself, but his widow sold it, and it is now located in the Diocesan Office of Porvoo. He died in Saint Petersburg, aged 64.

== Other sources ==
- Aimo Reitala: Thelning, Emanuel (1767-1831), national biography online. 14/02/2008. Helsinki: Finnish Literature Society.
