= Gustaf Mauritz Armfelt =

Finnish-Swedish-Russian courtier (1757–1814)

His Excellency The High Well-born Count Gustaf Mauritz Armfelt
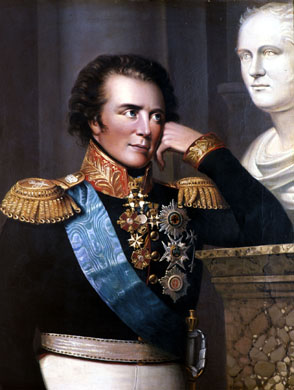
- Armfelt standing next to the bust of Alexander I by Johan Erik Lindh, 1845 copy
- Born: 31 March 1757; Tarvasjoki, Sweden
- Died: 19 August 1814 (aged 57); Tsarskoye Selo, Russian Empire
- Burial place: Halikko Church
- Spouse: Hedvig Ulrika De la Gardie (m. 1785)
- Children: 8
- Military career
- Allegiance: Sweden; Russia
- Branch: Swedish Army; Russian Army
- Service years: 1780–1810
- Rank: General of the Infantry
- Units: Life Guards
- Commands: Nyland Infantry Regiment
- Conflicts: Russo-Swedish War (1788–1790); Battle of Elgsö; Battle of Partakoski; Battle of Savitaipale; War of the Third Coalition; War of the Fourth Coalition; Great Sortie of Stralsund; Franco-Swedish War; Dano-Swedish War of 1808–09; Battle of Lier
- Awards: Royal Order of the Seraphim; Order of the Sword; Lord of the Realm

Count Gustaf Mauritz Armfelt (Russian: Густав-Маврикий Максимович Армфельт, romanized: Gustav-Mavrikiy Maksimovich Armfel't; 31 March 1757 – 19 August 1814) was a Finnish-Swedish count, baron, courtier, general and diplomat who was later in Russian service.

In Finland, he is considered one of the greatest Finnish statesmen. His advice to Alexander I of Russia was of utmost importance for securing the autonomy of the Grand Duchy of Finland.

== Early ife ==
Armfelt was born in Tarvasjoki, Finland, into the noble Armfelt family on 31 March 1757. His father was major general, baron Magnus Vilhelm Armfelt and his mother was baroness Maria Catharina Wennerstedt. His brother was baron August Philip Armfelt. He was the great grandson of Charles XII of Sweden's general, Carl Gustaf Armfeldt.

== Career in the Kingdom of Sweden ==
In 1774, Armfelt became an ensign in the guards, but his frivolous behaviour involving a duel provoked the displeasure of Gustav III of Sweden. As a result, he thought it prudent to go abroad 1778. Subsequently, however, in 1780, Armfelt met the king again at Spa in the Austrian Netherlands and completely won over the previously disgruntled monarch with his natural amiability, intelligence and social gifts. Henceforth, his fortune was made. At first, he was given the position of maître des plaisirs in the Swedish court, but it wasn't long before more serious affairs were entrusted to him. He took part in negotiations with Catherine II of Russia in 1783, and, during the Russo-Swedish War of 1788–1790, he was one of the king's most trusted and active counsellors.

He displayed great valour in the field during this time. In 1788, when the Danes unexpectedly invaded Sweden and threatened Gothenburg, Armfelt organized the Dalecarlian levies under the king's direction and led them to victory. He remained absolutely faithful to King Gustav when nearly the whole of the Swedish nobility fell away from him. Armfelt distinguished himself in the later phases of the Russo-Swedish War, eventually becoming the Swedish plenipotentiary who negotiated the war's demise with the Treaty of Värälä in August 1790. Armfelt had been seriously wounded in the battle of Savitaipale in June 1790. During the reign of Gustav III, his influence was paramount in Sweden, though Armfelt protested against his master's headstrong championship of the Bourbons.

== Diplomacy ==
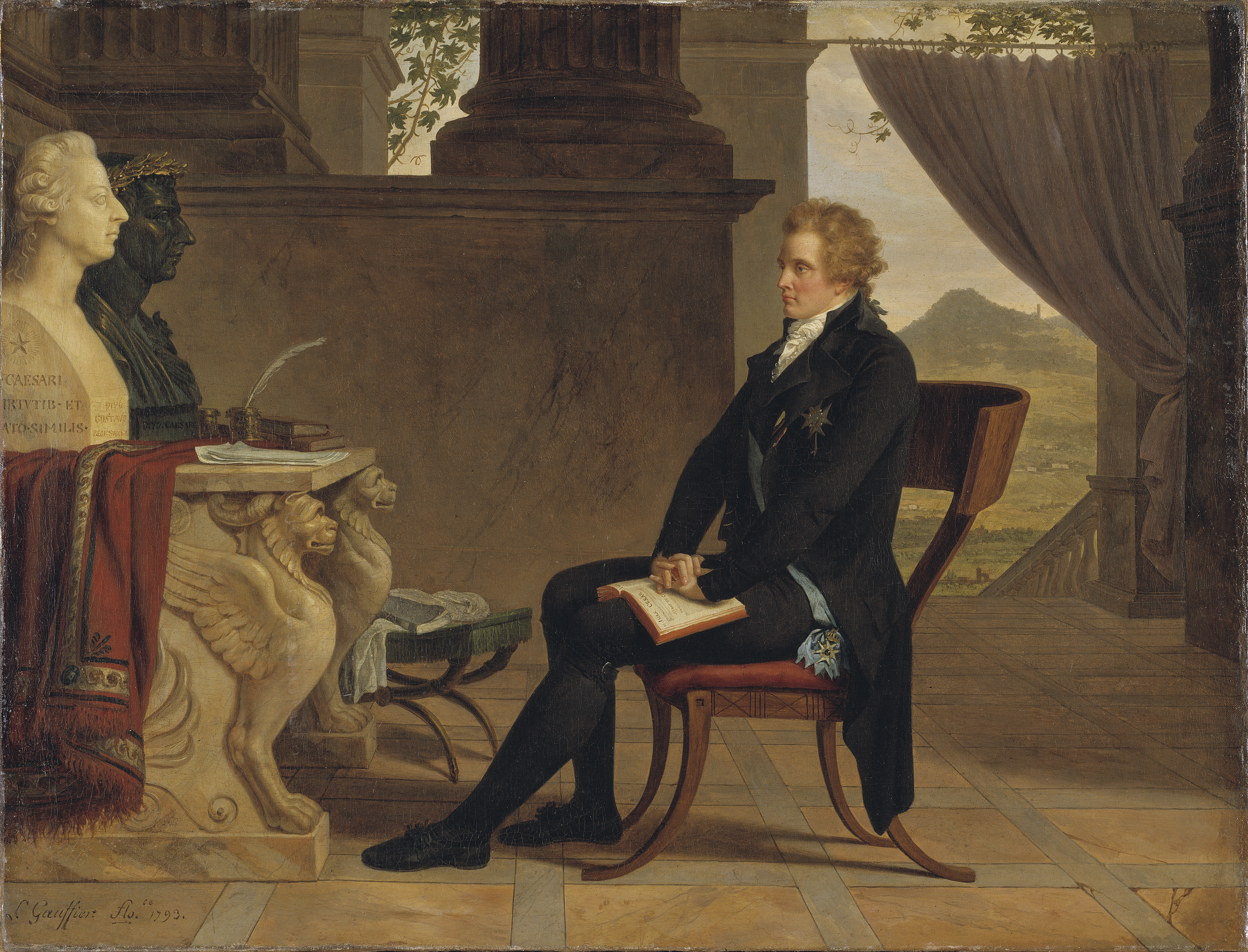
Gustaf Mauritz Armfelt in Florence in 1793 by Louis Gauffier.

On his deathbed in 1792, King Gustav III committed the care of his son to Armfelt and appointed him to the Privy Council, which was to advise the new regent, the king's younger brother, Charles. Armfelt was also appointed as the Governor of Stockholm, but the new regent was staunchly anti-Gustavian and sent Armfelt to serve as the Swedish ambassador to Naples to get rid of him.

From Naples, Armfelt began secret communications with Empress of Russia Catherine the Great, arguing that she should bring about by means of a military intervention a change in the Swedish government in favour of the Gustavians. The Armfelt Conspiracy, though, was discovered by spies for the regent, who immediately sent a Swedish man-of-war to Naples to seize him. With the assistance of the exiled British Queen Caroline, he was just barely able to escape. He fled to Russia, where he was interned at Kaluga 1794–1797. At home, he was condemned to death as a traitor and his property confiscated. His mistress, Magdalena Rudenschöld, was judged for complicity and pilloried on the Riddarhus Square before being imprisoned for two years in Stockholm.

== Against Napoleon's France ==
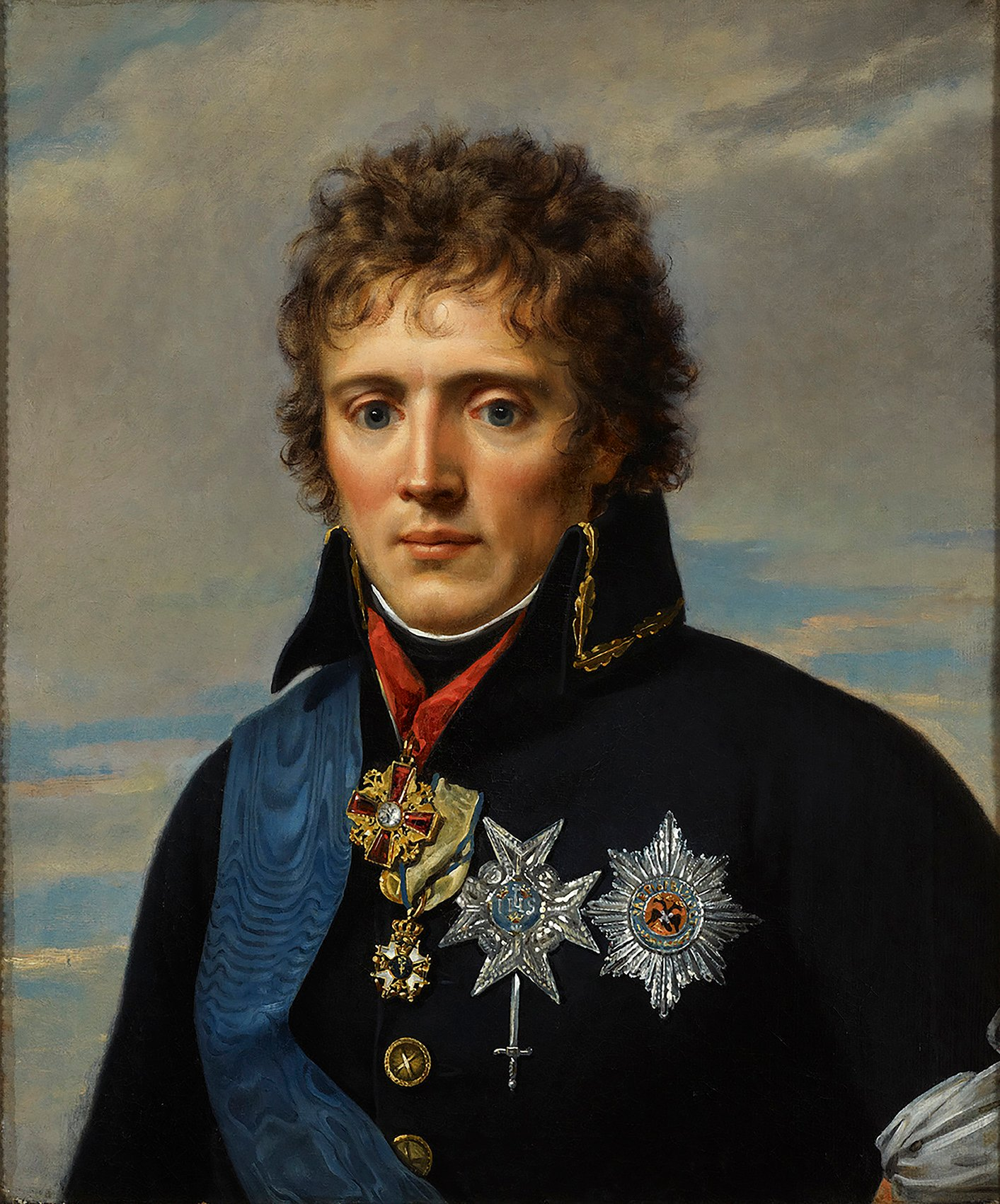
Armfelt by Joseph Maria Grassi 1799–1801.

When Gustav IV of Sweden attained his majority, Armfelt was completely rehabilitated and sent as Swedish ambassador to Vienna in 1802, but was obliged to quit the post two years later for sharply attacking the Austrian government's attitude towards Napoleon Bonaparte. From 1805 to 1807, he was the commander-in-chief of the Swedish forces in Pomerania, where he displayed ability and delayed the conquest of the duchy for as long as possible; the Great Sortie of Stralsund was particularly successful. On his return home, he was appointed commander-in-chief of the Norwegian frontier, where he was stifled in his duties by the constant flow of ordres, contre-ordres et désordres from his master.

== Imperial Russia and the Grand Duchy of Finland ==
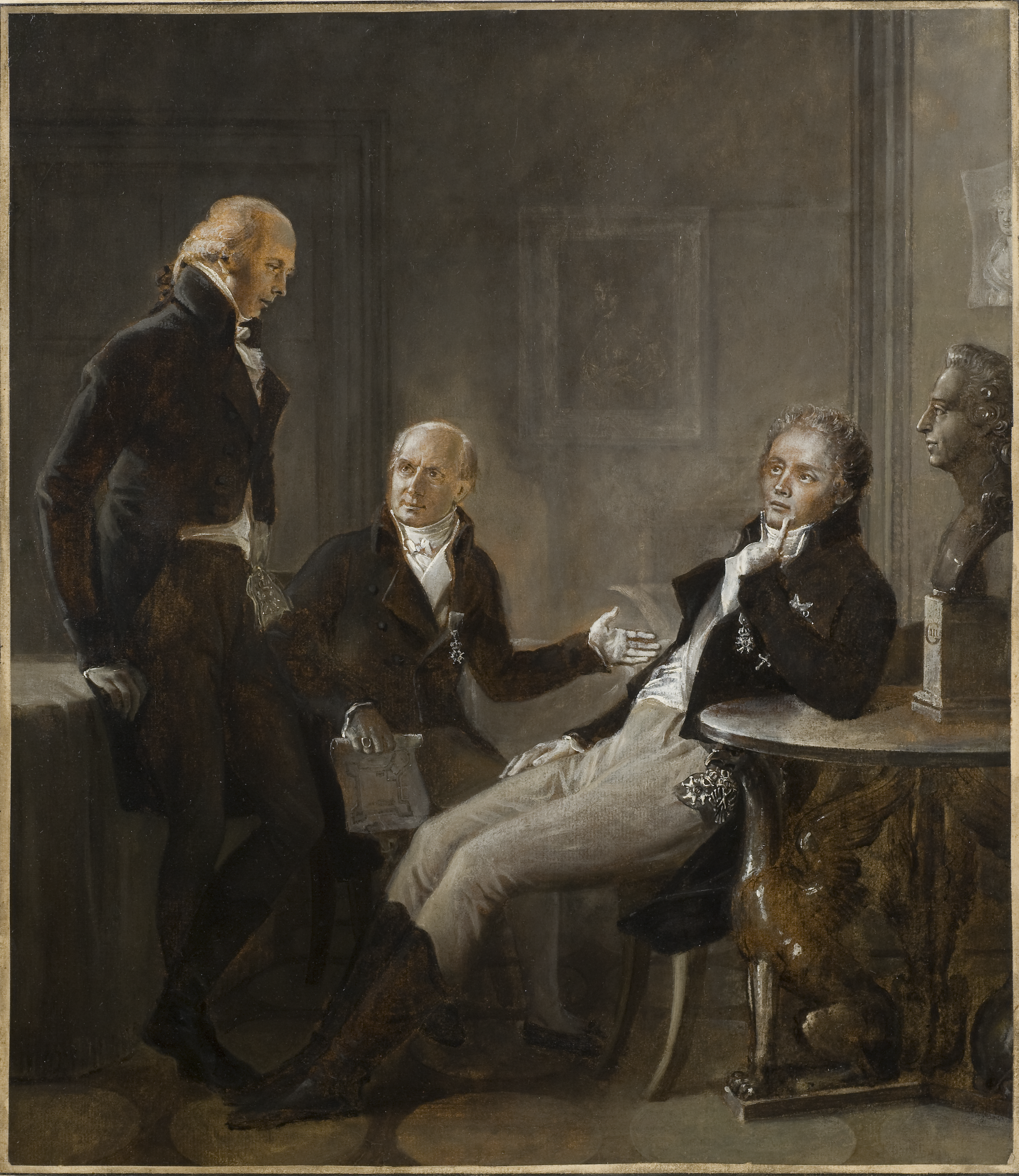
Three Gustavians – Johan Fredrik Aminoff, Johan Albrecht Ehrenström, and Gustaf Mauritz Armfelt – emerged as significant figures in the newly formed Grand Duchy of Finland.

Armfelt was firmly opposed to the revolutionaries who overthrew Gustav IV and exiled his family in the Coup of 1809. He was the most courageous of the deposed king's supporters and resolved afterwards to retire to Finland, which had been ceded to Russia.

Armfelt's position greatly improved in Russia. After deposing Speransky he exercised almost as much influence over Emperor Alexander I as Adam Czartoryski. He contributed more than anyone else to Finnish independence with his plan to turn the Grand Duchy of Finland into an autonomous state within the Russian Empire.

Armfelt, who had been Chancellor of the Royal Academy of Turku from 1791 to 1792, was again made the chancellor of institution, which had been renamed Imperial Academy, in 1812. He held the position for two years. In 1812, the grateful Emperor raised him to the rank of Count.

He served as the Minister State Secretary of Finland, the Grand Duchy's highest representative, in St Petersburg 1812–14. He was also briefly Governor-General of Finland in 1813.

He died at Tsarskoe Selo near Saint Petersburg on 19 August 1814.

== Titles ==
- Russia Count (1812)
- Sweden Baron (1757)

== Honours ==
- Denmark Order of the Elephant Grand Cross (1787)
- Sweden Order of the Sword Knight (1789)
- Russia Order of Saint Anna 1st Class (1789)
- Russia Order of Alexander Nevsky Silver Star with diamonds (1789)
- Russia Order of St. Andrew Silver Cross with diamonds (1789)
- Sweden Order of the Sword Grand Cross (1789)
- Sweden Order of the Seraphim Knight (1789)
- Sweden Lord of the Realm

== Legacy ==
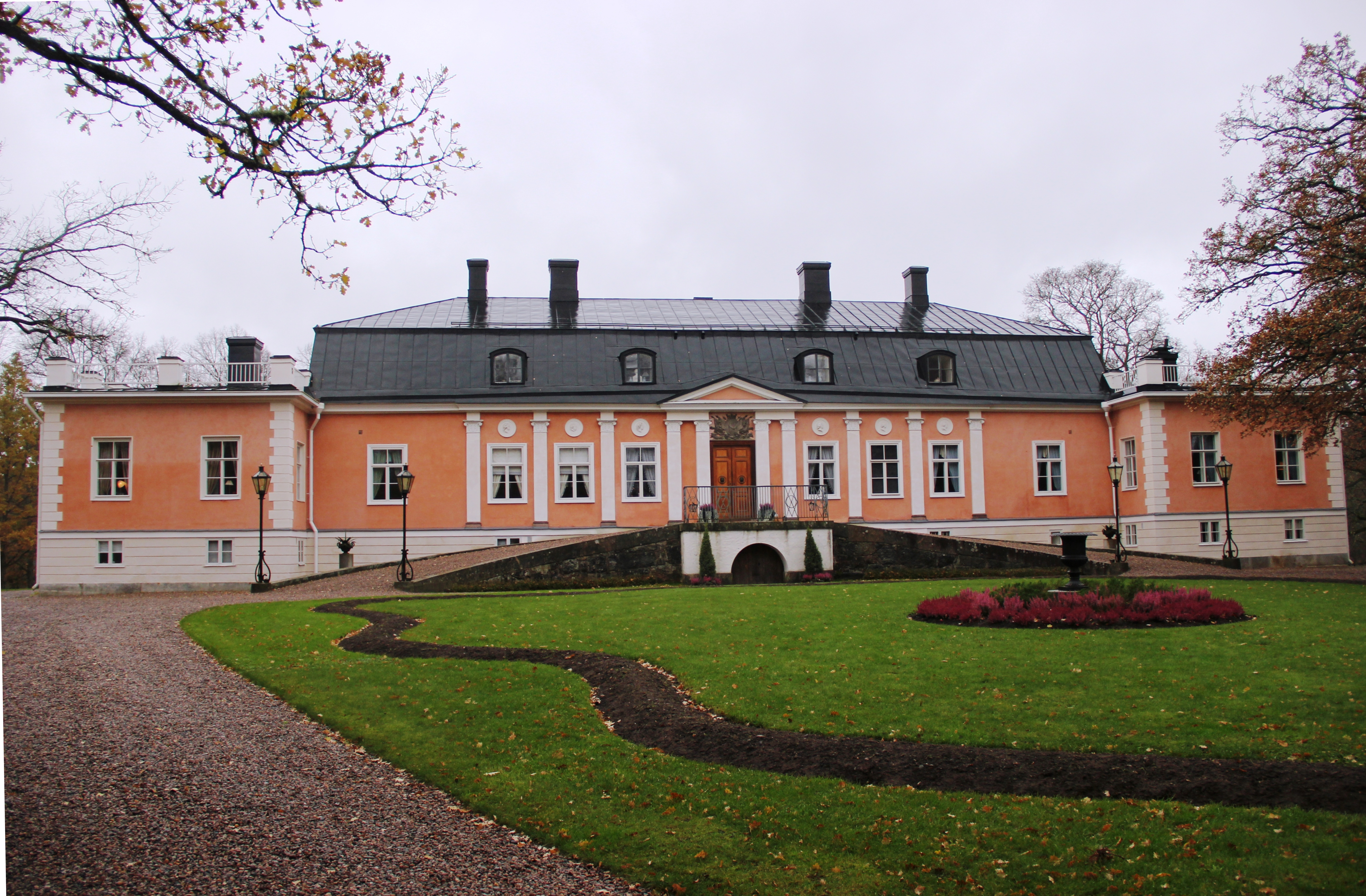
Joensuu Mansion was the estate of Armfelt in Halikko, Finland.

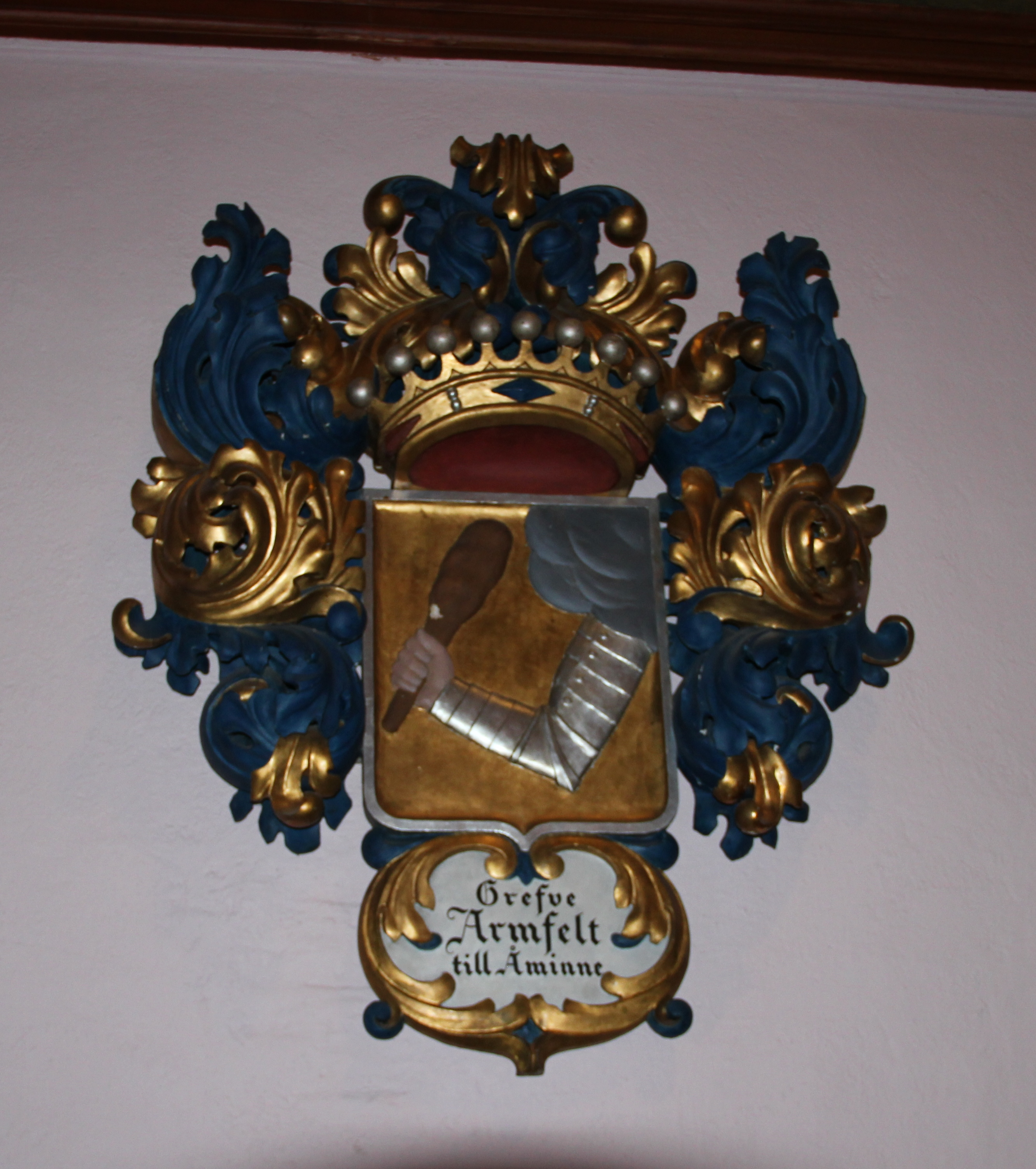
Armfelt coat of arms at Halikko Church.

Together with Count Georg Magnus Sprengtporten, Armfelt is regarded as one of the fathers of Finnish independence. Because of his unpopularity among the anti-Gustavian Swedish nobility and the fact that he "turned Russian", Armfelt has been a somewhat mysterious and generally unknown character in Swedish history.

Ignorance of Armfelt's accomplishments persisted for well over a century in Sweden and only recently has a more nuanced, positive approach to Armfelt emerged there. In Finland, he has always been regarded as a patriot and statesman.

Ambassador Ilkka Pastinen, who translated Stig Ramel's book about Armfelt from Swedish to Finnish, describes Armfelt's estate, Joensuu Mansion, as significant for the Finns, comparable to how Mount Vernon, the private home of President George Washington, is significant for Americans. Armfelt supported the American Revolutionary War.

Because Armfelt chose to remain loyal to Finland and its people, rather than its former ruler, he was labeled as a traitor in Sweden and sentenced to death for treason. The Swedish people could not accept at the time the loss of Finland, which had been part of the realm for over 600 years. Their anguish was exacerbated by the fact that the province had been lost to Sweden's archenemy, Russia. Armfelt's death sentence, however, had no actual meaning outside of Sweden as there was never a realistic Swedish attempt to recapture Finland. Politicians threatened action mainly to gain favour among the nobles and populace. In 1812, Sweden allied with Russia, and the sentence was annulled.

== Family ==
In 1785, Armfelt married Countess Hedvig Ulrika De la Gardie (1761–1832), daughter of Count Carl Julius De la Gardie and his wife, Countess Magdalena Christina Stenbock.

They had the following eight children:

1. Countess Maria Magdalena Catharina Augusta Armfelt, (1786–1845), married Count Axel Adolf Piper-Ängsö (1778–1827) and had issue;
2. Baron Gustaf Fredrik Armfelt (1788–1789);
3. Baron Carl Armfelt, born and died 1788;
4. Baron Magnus Armfelt, born and died 1788;
5. Count Gustaf Magnus Armfelt, (1792–1856), major-general, married Louise Cuthbert-Brook, Lady of Joensuu (1801–1865);
6. Count Alexander Armfelt, (1794–1876), captain, Finnish minister secretary of state, privy councillor, married firstly Baroness Siri Oxenstierna (1801-1841); married secondly Aline Demidov (1808-1898) and had issue from both marriages;
7. Baron Constantin Armfelt, (1796–1797);
8. Count Carl Magnus Wilhelm Armfelt, (1797–1878), married Baroness Adelaide Sohvia Vlhelmiina Karoliina von Stedingk (1802–1863; div. 1834); married secondly Ulrika Christina Vilhelmina Bohman (1818–1892), and had issue from both marriages.

From the affair with the actress Mademoiselle L'Eclair in Paris, Armfelt had an illegitimate son, Maurice L'Eclair (1780–1841). From the affair with Princess Wilhelmine, Duchess of Sagan, Armfelt had an illegitimate daughter, Countess Adelaide Gustava Aspasie (Vava) Armfelt (1801–1881). Maurice was knighted in 1816 in Sweden as Mauritz Clairfelt and became a general; Vava was adopted in 1812 into the Armfelt family. He also had an out of wedlock daughter with Princess Ekaterina Nikolaevna Galitzina (1764–1832), Princess Ekaterina Gagarina (1794–1835).

== See also ==
- Armfelt family
- Georg Magnus Sprengtporten

Cultural offices
Preceded by First holder	Swedish Academy, Seat No.14; 1786–1794	Succeeded by Malte Ramel
Preceded by Johan Murberg	Swedish Academy, Seat No.17; 1805–1811	Succeeded by Gustaf af Wetterstedt
Political offices
Preceded by Fabian Steinheil	Governor-General of Finland; 1813–1814	Succeeded by Fabian Steinheil
