= Kangasala =

- City
- Kangasalan kaupunki Kangasala stad
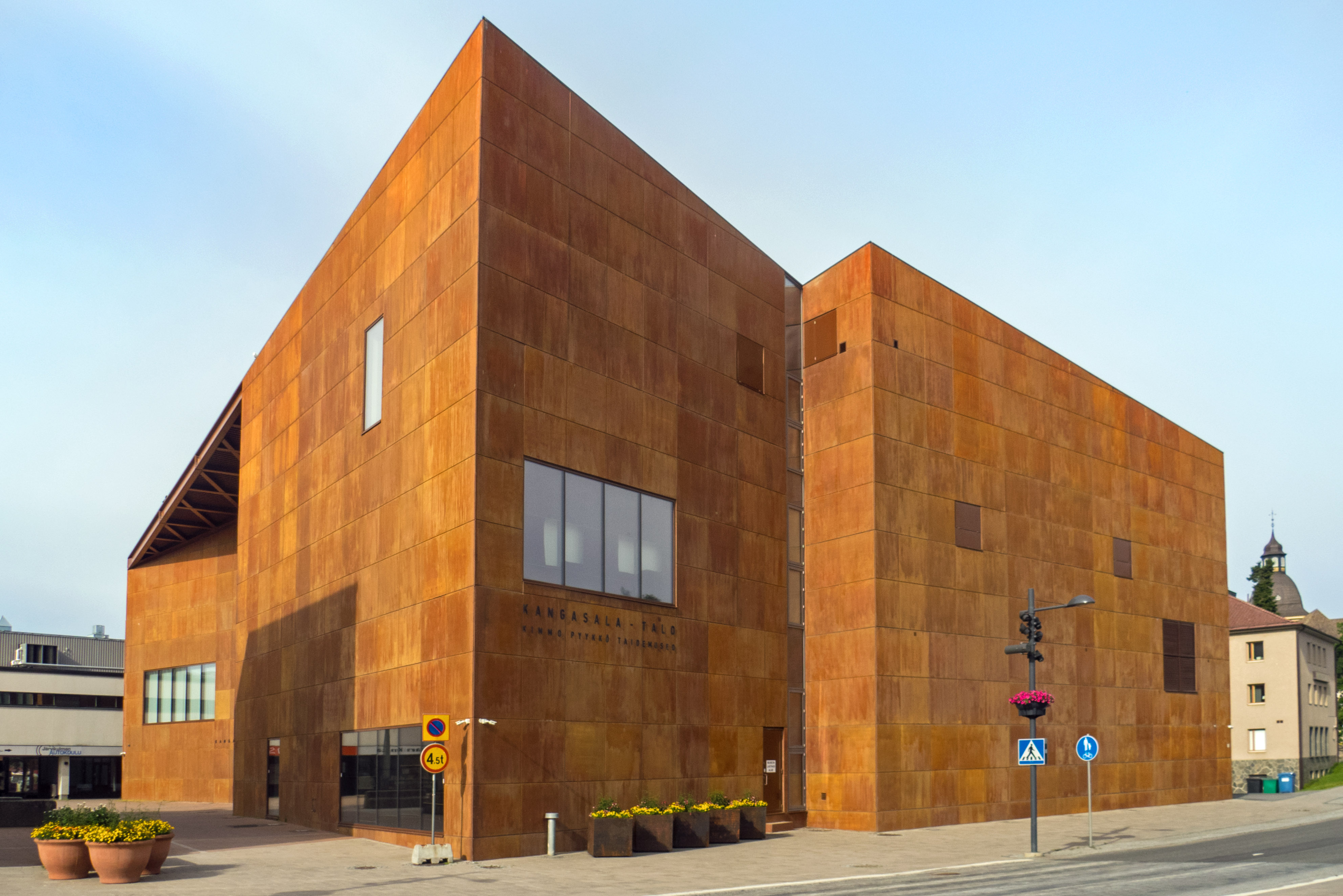
- Kangasala-talo, cultural building in Kangasala

- Coat of arms

- Interactive map of Kangasala
- Coordinates: 61°28′N 024°04′E
- Country: Finland
- Region: Pirkanmaa
- Sub-region: Tampere
- Metropolitan area: Tampere
- Charter: 1865

Government
  - City manager: Oskari Auvinen

Area (2018-01-01)
  - Total: 870.86 km^{2} (336.24 sq mi)
  - Land: 658.02 km^{2} (254.06 sq mi)
  - Water: 212.83 km^{2} (82.17 sq mi)
  - Rank: 130th largest in Finland

Population (2025-12-31)
  - Total: 34,379
  - Rank: 34th largest in Finland
  - Density: 52.25/km^{2} (135.3/sq mi)

Population by native language
  - Finnish: 95.8% (official)
  - Swedish: 0.3%
  - Others: 3.9%

Population by age
  - 0 to 14: 18.8%
  - 15 to 64: 60.2%
  - 65 or older: 20.9%
- Time zone: UTC+02:00 (EET)
  - Summer (DST): UTC+03:00 (EEST)
- Website: www.kangasala.fi

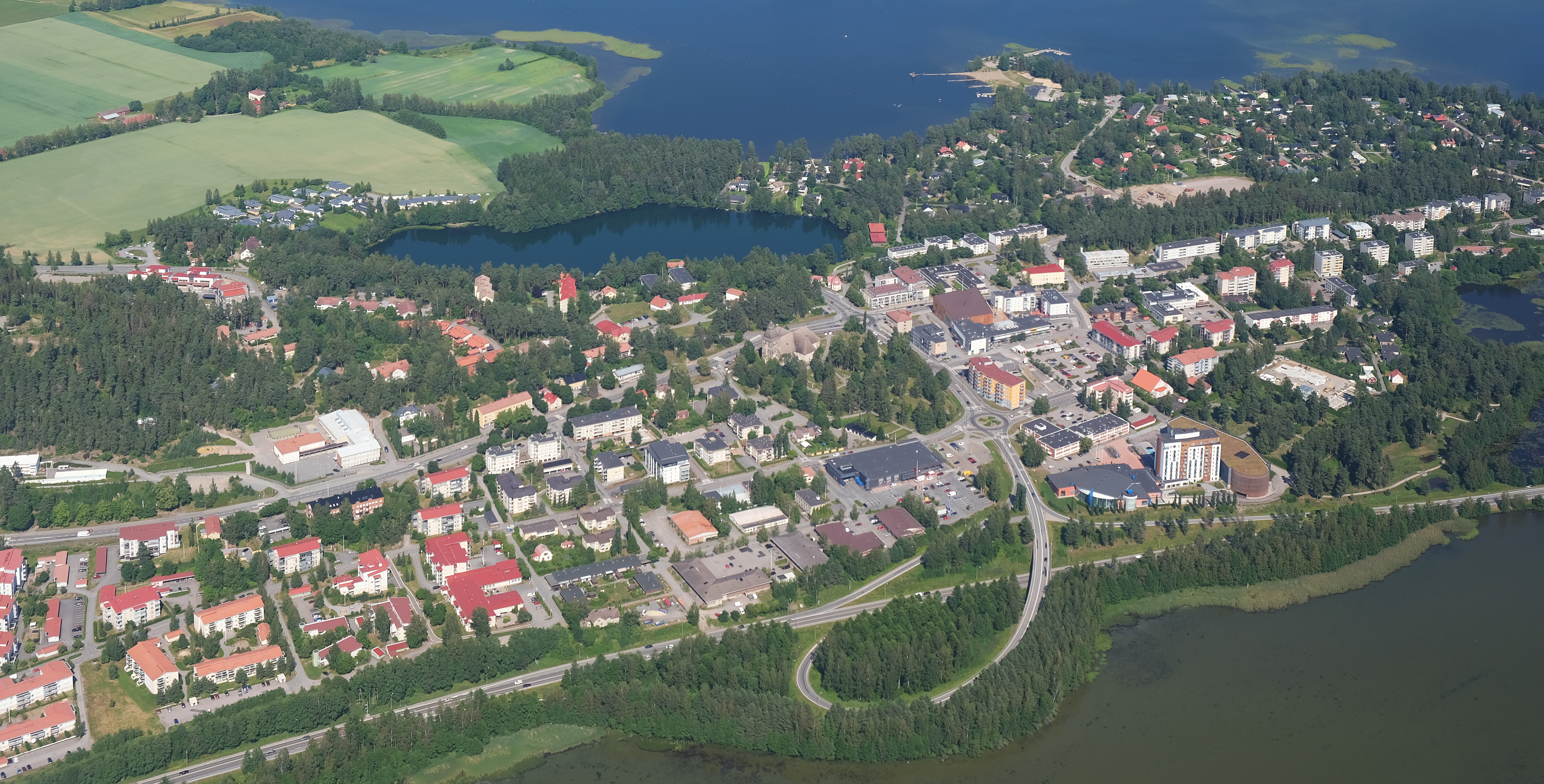
Aerial view of the town.

Kangasala is a town in Finland, located in the Pirkanmaa region. It lies to the east of the regional capital, Tampere. The population of Kangasala is approximately 34,000, while the metropolitan area has a population of approximately 428,000. It is the 34th most populous municipality in Finland.

Kangasala was founded in 1865. The town covers an area of 870.86 km^{2} (336.24 sq mi) of which 212.83 km^{2} (82.17 sq mi) is water. The population density is 52.25 inhabitants per square kilometre (135.3/sq mi).

Kangasala is known for its mansions, such as Liuksiala, where the Swedish queen Karin Månsdotter lived as a widow, and Wääksy. Kangasala has a long history of tourism due to its cultural aspect, especially its museums. The landscape includes ridges and lakes. For example, the lakes Roine, Längelmävesi and Vesijärvi are located in Kangasala. These lakes are mentioned in Topelius' poem. Lake Vesijärvi is known as the lake with the scenic view described in the poem.

The municipality of Sahalahti was merged with Kangasala in 2005 and the municipality of Kuhmalahti in 2011.

== Tourism ==
=== Springs ===
Kangasala was known to be a popular destination in the 18th century. At that time, the waters of Kuohu Spring (Kuohunlähde) were believed to have healing powers on those who ventured into it and Kangasala became known among tourists as a place to rest. Refreshing in a health spa, bathing, taking outdoor exercise and "taking the waters" were popular amongst the aristocracy. It was also the reason why the first tourists came to Kangasala to spend their holidays there.

A water well building was built by the Kuohu Spring, which was later followed by a separate restaurant and hotel. Spa tourism if often considered to be a predecessor of modern holiday making. However, at the time, it was primarily a pastime of the nobles and the prosperous bourgeoisie only.

=== Ridges ===
The golden age of spa tourism lasted about a hundred years, as interest in health springs began to decline in the 1840s. The artists of the Romantic period admired nature and frequently praised its beauty. Artists were drawn to Kangasala to view the landscapes. Amongst university students, wandering their homeland's natural environment became a way of showing patriotic love.

In 1775, the king of Sweden, Gustav III, was so taken by the scenery of the Syrjänkorkee ridge that he believed it to have been the very place where Satan tempted Jesus and promised him all the wonders of the world. Syrjänkorkee also made an impression on the Russian tsar and Grand Duke of Finland, Alexander I, in 1819. Thus, it was later renamed Keisarinharju, which can be translated as 'Emperor's Ridge'.

In addition to Keisarinharju, there are three other ridges that are popular panoramic sightseeing locations. The largest and highest of these is Kirkkoharju, also called Helaamäki, which stretches from Vatiala to the church of Kangasala. Kuohunharju (Kuohu Ridge) and Vehoniemenharju (Vehoniemi Ridge) are also well known for their views. Haralanvuori, or Haralanharju, located in Suinula, northern Kangasala, is a rocky hill, despite its second name.

=== A Summer's Day in Kangasala ===
In the Summer of 1853, Helsinki suffered from a cholera epidemic. Zacharias Topelius escaped the disease by retreating to the countryside. He visited lieutenant-colonel Aminoff's farm near Haralanvuori with his female acquaintance, Lotta Lindqvist. Topelius became fond of the views from the "Harjula ridge" and wrote his famous poem "A Summer's Day in Kangasala". Later, Gabriel Linsén composed a melody for the poem. From 1995, the melody has been the provincial hymn of the Pirkanmaa region, and it is one of the most widely known Finnish melodies.

=== Landscapes ===
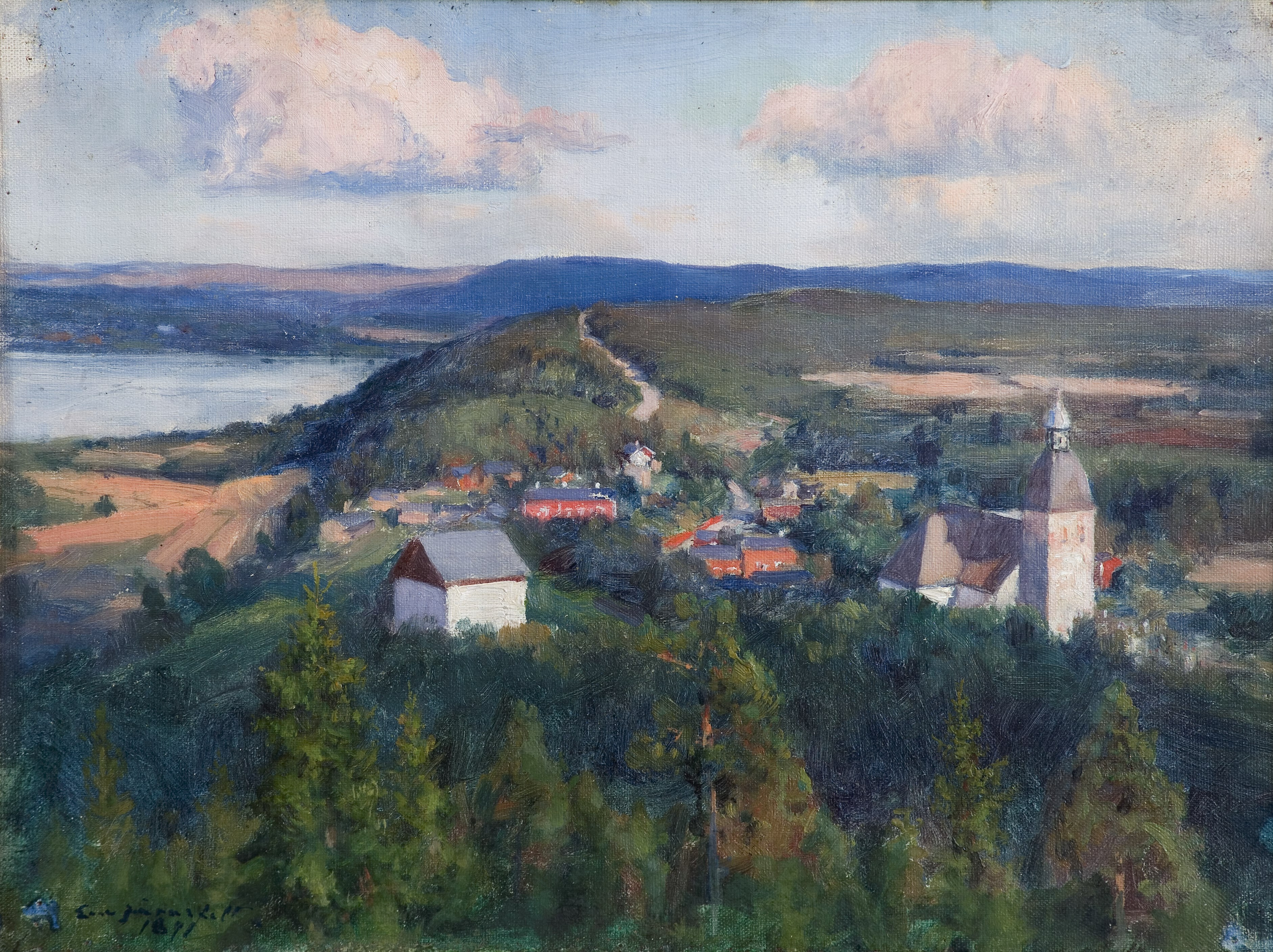
Landscape from Kangasala by Eero Järnefelt in 1891

The landscapes of Kangasala made an impression on other Finnish authors as well. Poets like Frans Mikael Franzén, Johan Jakob Nervander, Emil von Qvanten, and Johan Ludvig Runeberg wrote about the environment.

These landscapes were a source for an arising sense of nationality and arts that were means of concretizing the admiration and pride directed at them. In particular, the early 19th-century art of painting, with its idyllic portraits of country and nature, expresses the intellectual world of Romanticism. The countryside is filled with fields, forests, hills, ridges, lakes, and rivers.

In the 19th century, Kangasala's landscapes were painted by several famous painters. The earliest portrayers of the local landscape include Emanuel Thelning, a Swede sent to Kangasala by baron Gustaf Mauritz Armfelt, after he himself had visited the healing spring of Kuohu in 1811, and the German Carl von Kügelgen, royal painter of Alexander I, who painted at least three paintings representing Kangasala. His workpiece Vues pittoresques de la Finlande, which includes 15 lithographs, is often considered the start of Finnish landscape painting. The Hermitage in St. Petersburg contains pieces of art by von Kügelgen.

Other artists who painted Kangasala were Werner Holmberg, Einar Ilmoni, Eero Järnefelt, Hjalmar Munsterhjelm, Sigurd Wettenhovi-Aspa and Magnus von Wright, who painted six paintings on Kangasala in the 1860s.

The invention of dry plate photography in 1882 made taking photographs easier and cheaper. Furthermore, landscape photography has started to gain popularity in the city. As far as is currently known, the first actual landscape photographs in Kangasala were taken by Gustin Lojander in 1893. His series of photographs presented the landscapes and sightseeing of Kangasala.

The increased popularity of landscape photography decreased artists' interest in the province of Tavastia (Häme). The search for the roots of Finnishness has now turned towards Karelia (Karjala). Still, Kangasala wasn't forgotten by artists. The number of local artists – who often were landscapists of their home district – kept on growing. Photographs helped in making the nation aware of Kangasala's landscapes. At the end of the 19th century, advances in the printing press made it possible to spread pictures throughout the country in the form of affordable picture postcards.

=== Observation towers ===
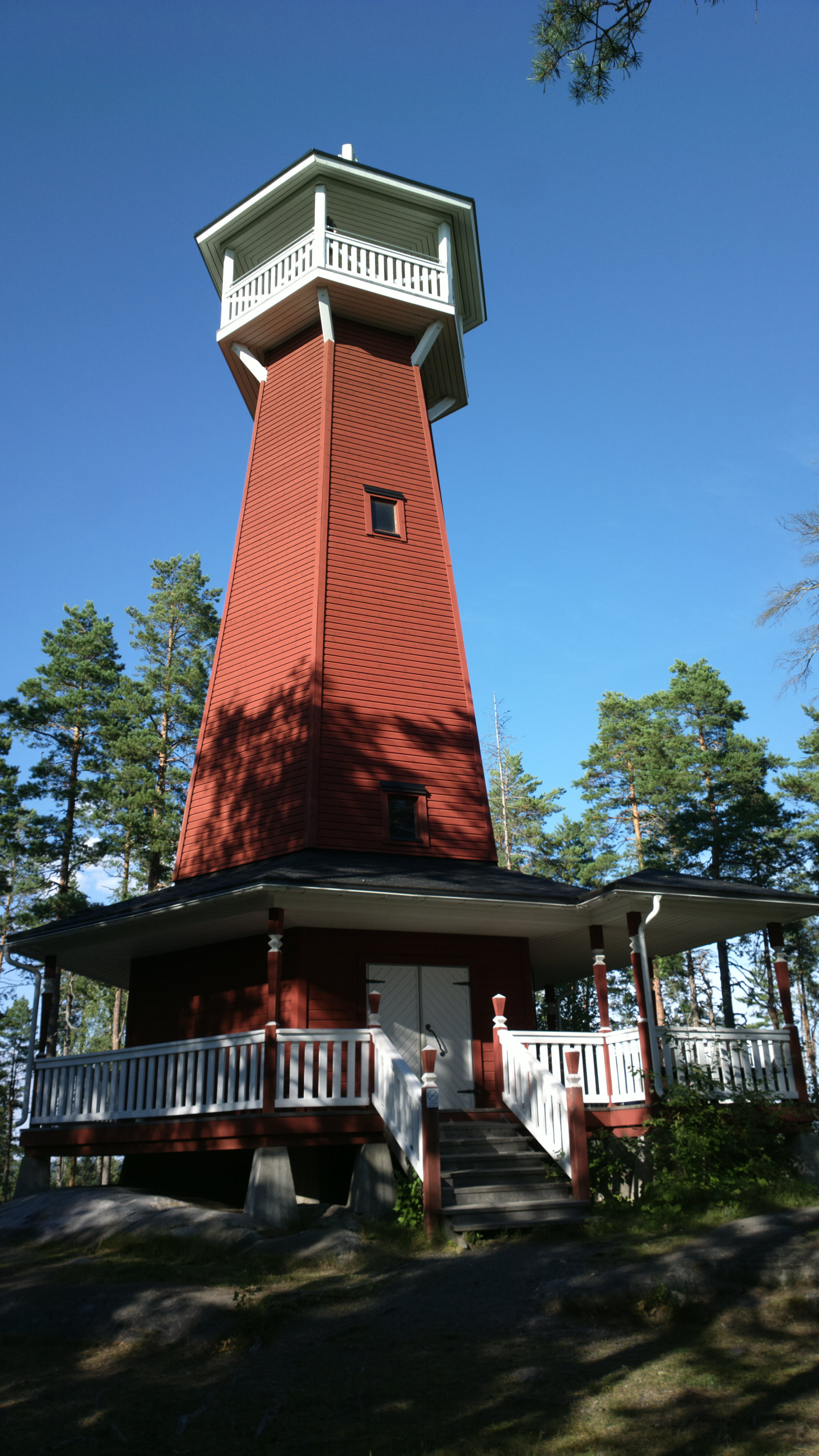
The rebuilt Haralanharju Observation Tower in 2013

The artists' descriptions of Kangasala lured more and more travelers to the parish. People had to climb high, even up the trees, to be able to see the views. Although the ridgetops were relatively treeless at that time – because of the sawmill industry's great demand for wood – the construction of observation towers was considered necessary to provide new viewpoints. Many lookout spots (except Kuohunharju) got their own observation towers in the 1880s or 1890s. The first observation tower was built on Keisarinharju in 1881. A panoramic pavilion had been built there at the time of the visit of Alexander I, but it had already vanished by the 1850s. The towers at Haralanharju and Keisarinharju were destroyed by an arsonist in 2006 and 2007. Now only the towers at Vehoniemenharju and Kirkkoharju remain, but plans were in progress for rebuilding both towers within a year of the first arson. The Haralanharju tower was rebuilt and finished in 2008, however the Keisarinharju tower was never built into its original height. Instead a shorter observation spot known as Keisarinportaat was built on its place.

The ridges of Kangasala and Tampere are part of the same ridge formation. Travelers often used to visit both the ridges of Kangasala and Pyynikinharju (Pyynikki Ridge) in Tampere. Together, they were the most popular tourist attractions in Western Finland. In 1890, approximately 800 visitors came to Kangasala, 1,200–1,400 visited Pyynikki, and Imatra, the most popular tourist attraction in Finland at the time, was a destination for about 5,000 tourists.

The ideological conceptions created by the artist had a great influence on the Finnish sense of nationality, as had picture postcards and the lake views from the observation towers. When the period of Russification began at the end of the 19th-century, Finnish nature worked as an upbringing force for national self-esteem and as a unifier of Finnish culture. Kangasala played a role in that development.

== Demographics ==
Population size 1990–2025
Year	Population
1990	24,407
1995	25,106
2000	25,630
2005	27,927
2010	29,675
2015	30,607
2020	32,214
2025	34,379

== Notable residents ==
- Karin Hansdotter, mistress of King John III of Sweden, was given the Wääksy Manor in 1561.
- Karin Månsdotter, queen of Sweden, lived in the Liuksiala Manor until her death in 1612
- Finnish politician and journalist Agathon Meurman was born and lived in Kangasala, and owned the Liuksiala manor.
- Finnish author Jalmari Finne was born and lived in Kangasala.
- Finnish actor Markku Peltola lived in Kangasala.
- A Finnish Internet hit Marko Vanhanen lives in Kangasala.
- Finnish educator Sofia Hagman, founder and manager of the first Folk high school in Finland.
- Finnish musician Noora Louhimo, former lead vocalist of Battle Beast <https://www.youtube.com/watch?v=-ikD8c8ZwqU>

== See also ==
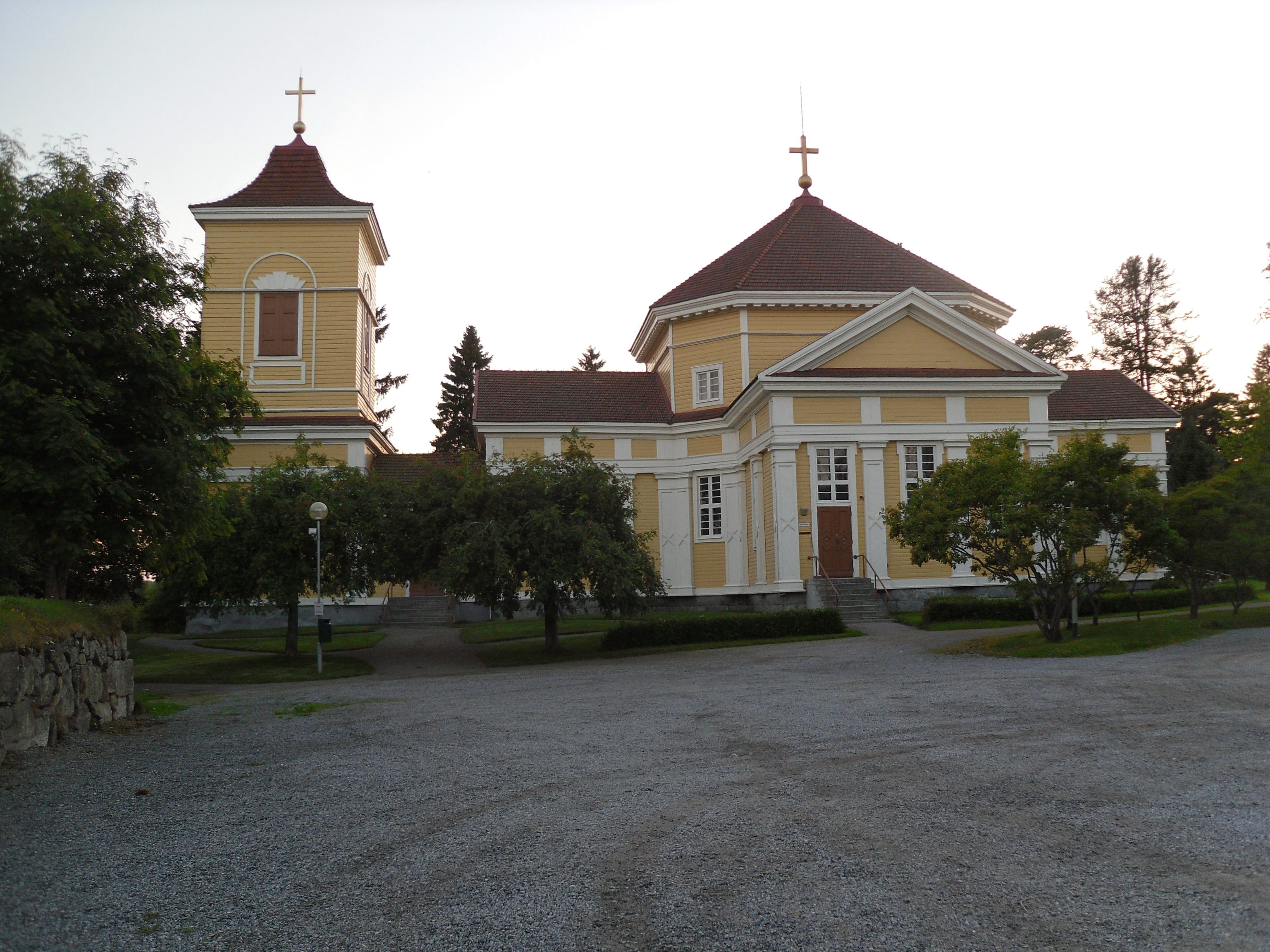
A 19th century wooden church in the Sahalahti village

- Finnish national road 12
- Finnish national road 58
- Lake Kaukajärvi
- Kangasala railway station
- Sahalahti (village)
- Culture of Finland
