= Sahalahti (village) =

- Village
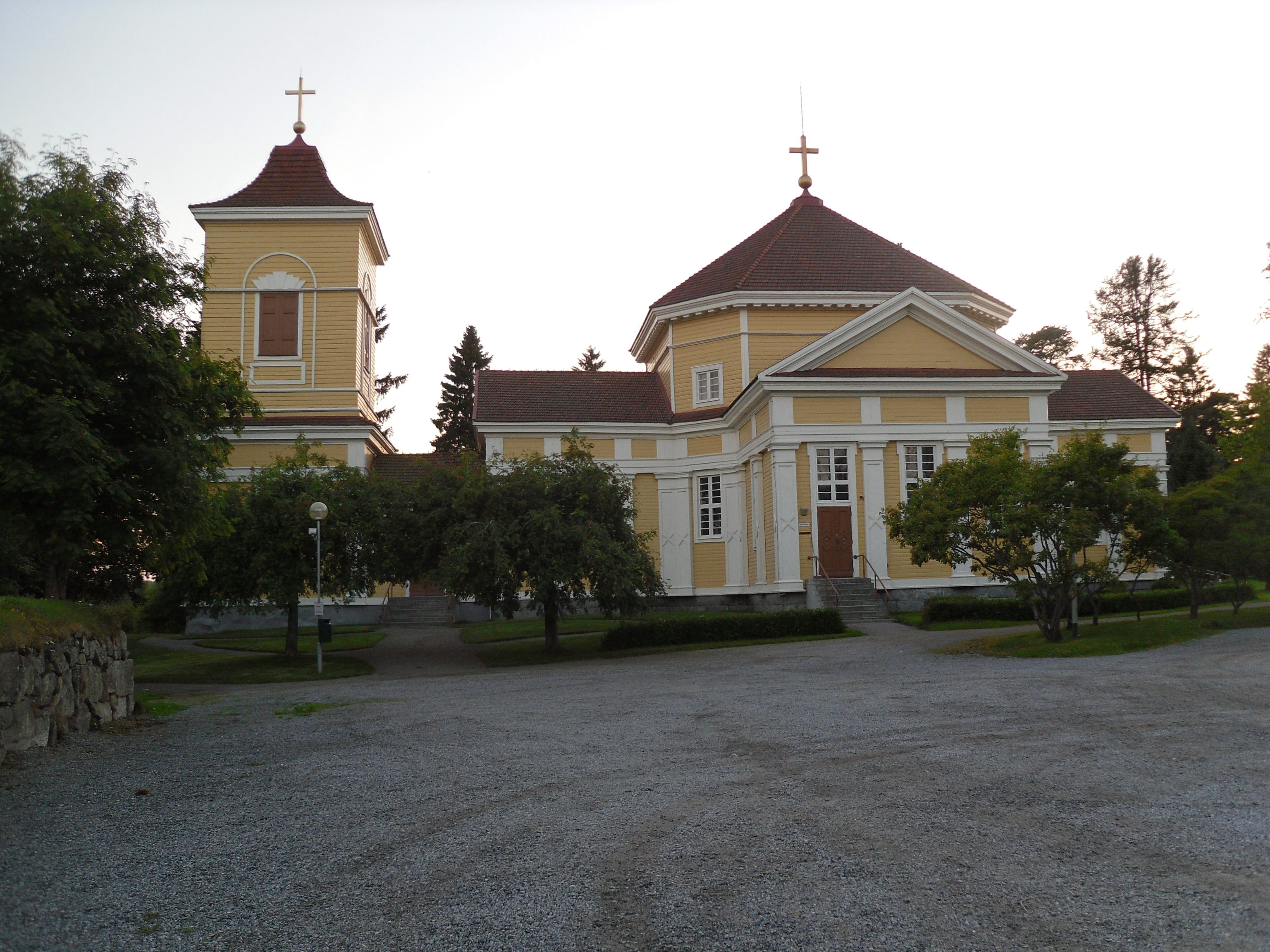
- Sahalahti Church

- Location in Finland
- Coordinates: 61°28′31.05311″N 24°19′48.89726″E
- Country: Finland
- Region: Pirkanmaa
- Municipality: Kangasala

Area
  - Total: 3.27 km^{2} (1.26 sq mi)

Population (31 December 2018)
  - Total: 1,195
  - Density: 3,654/km^{2} (9,460/sq mi)
- Time zone: UTC+2 (EET)
  - Summer (DST): UTC+3 (EEST)
- Postal code: 36420

Sahalahden kirkonkylä (lit. 'Sahalahti church village') is an urban area in the eastern part of the Kangasala town and former administrative center of the former Sahalahti municipality in Pirkanmaa, Finland. At the end of 2018, the urban area had 1,195 inhabitants. It is 17 kilometres (11 mi) from the village to the town center of Kangasala and 34 kilometres (21 mi) to the city of Tampere. Lake Kirkkojärvi is located to the south of the settlement.

The Sahalahti Church is an Empire style wooden church designed by architect Carl Ludvig Engel, and built in 1827–1829. The services in Sahalahden kirkonkylä include a parish center, a health center, a grocery store, a comprehensive school and a kindergarten.

== See also ==
- Finnish regional road 325
