= Sahalahti (former municipality) =

Former municipality of Finland

Coordinates: 61°28′N 24°19′E

Coat of arms of Sahalahti

Sahalahti is a former municipality of Finland. It was located in the province of Western Finland and was part of the Pirkanmaa region. The municipality had a population of 2,229 (2003) and covered an area of 171.96 km² of which 35.09 km² was water. The population density was 16.3 inhabitants per km². Sahalahti joined to Kangasala on 1 January 2005. Its original administrative center was the village by the same name.

The municipality was unilingually Finnish.
