= Koskikeskinen =

Lake in Jämsä, Finland

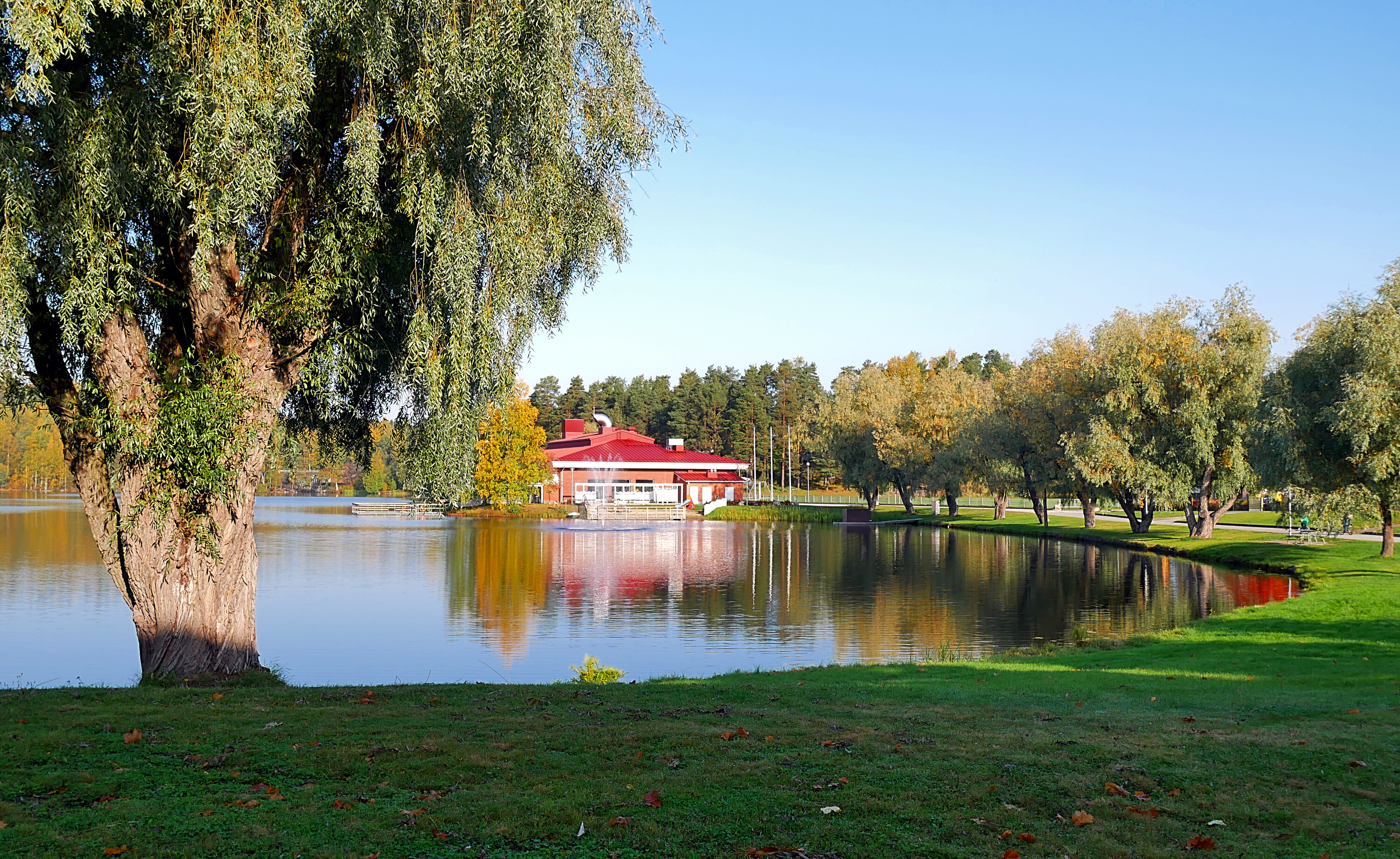
- Interactive map of Koskikeskinen
- Location: Jämsä (Jämsänkoski)
- Coordinates: 61°55′13″N 25°09′46″E
- Basin countries: Finland
- Max. length: 650 metres (2,130 ft)
- Max. width: 500 metres (1,600 ft)
- Surface area: 13,961 km^{2} (5,390 sq mi)

Koskikeskinen is a lake located in central Jämsänkoski, Central Finland. Koskikeskinen is a backwater between two rapids that belong to the Jämsänjoki route. The lake is surrounded by the urban area of Jämsänkoski. Koskikeskinen is 96 meters above sea level. The area is 14 hectares and the coast is 2.41 kilometers long. The lake is part of the Kymi River's drainage basin.

== Features of the lake ==
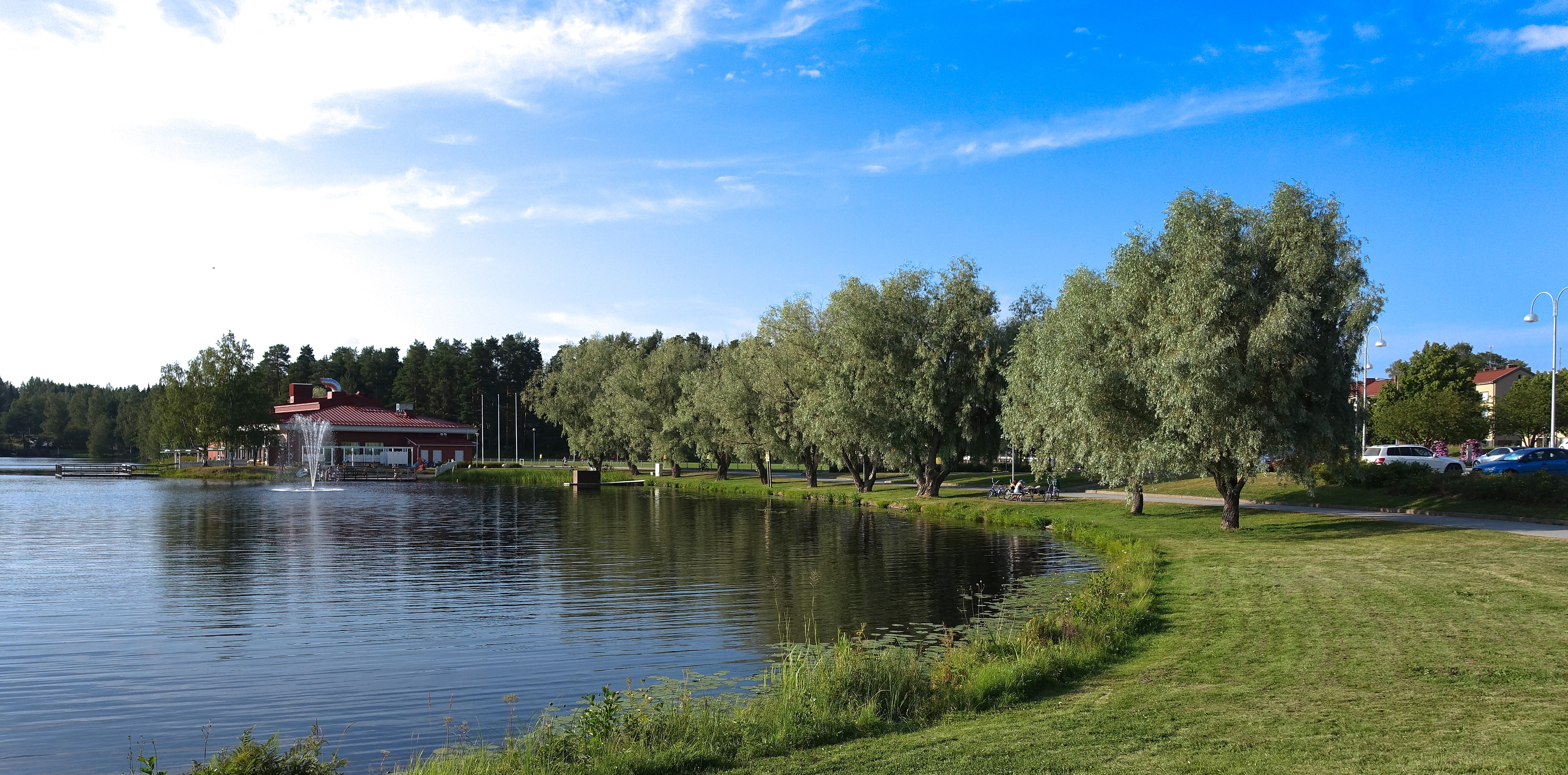
View of Koskikeskinen 2021

Koskikeskinen is 650 meters long, 500 meters wide and covers an area of 14.0 hectares. It is located in the upper reaches of Jämsänjoki below the lake Kankarisvesi. The short river bed of the Jämsänjoki starts from the Kankarisvesi, which descends through two parallel rapids, Naiskoski and Rekolankoski, into the Koskikeskinen. The Rekolankoski power plant operates on the western route, while the Naiskoski is used as a spillway. The Jämsänjoki continues south from Koskikeskinen for about 14 kilometers, discharging into the Päijänne. The surface of Koskikeskinen is 5.6 meters below Kankarisvesi and around 13 meters below Jämsänjoki. The river flows through a pipe under the Jämsänkoski paper mill. The old river bed is located under the mill and has been turned into a tunnel used as another spillway. These water systems greatly affect the ecology of the lake and its water situation. There are two small islets in the lake.

== Northeastern part ==
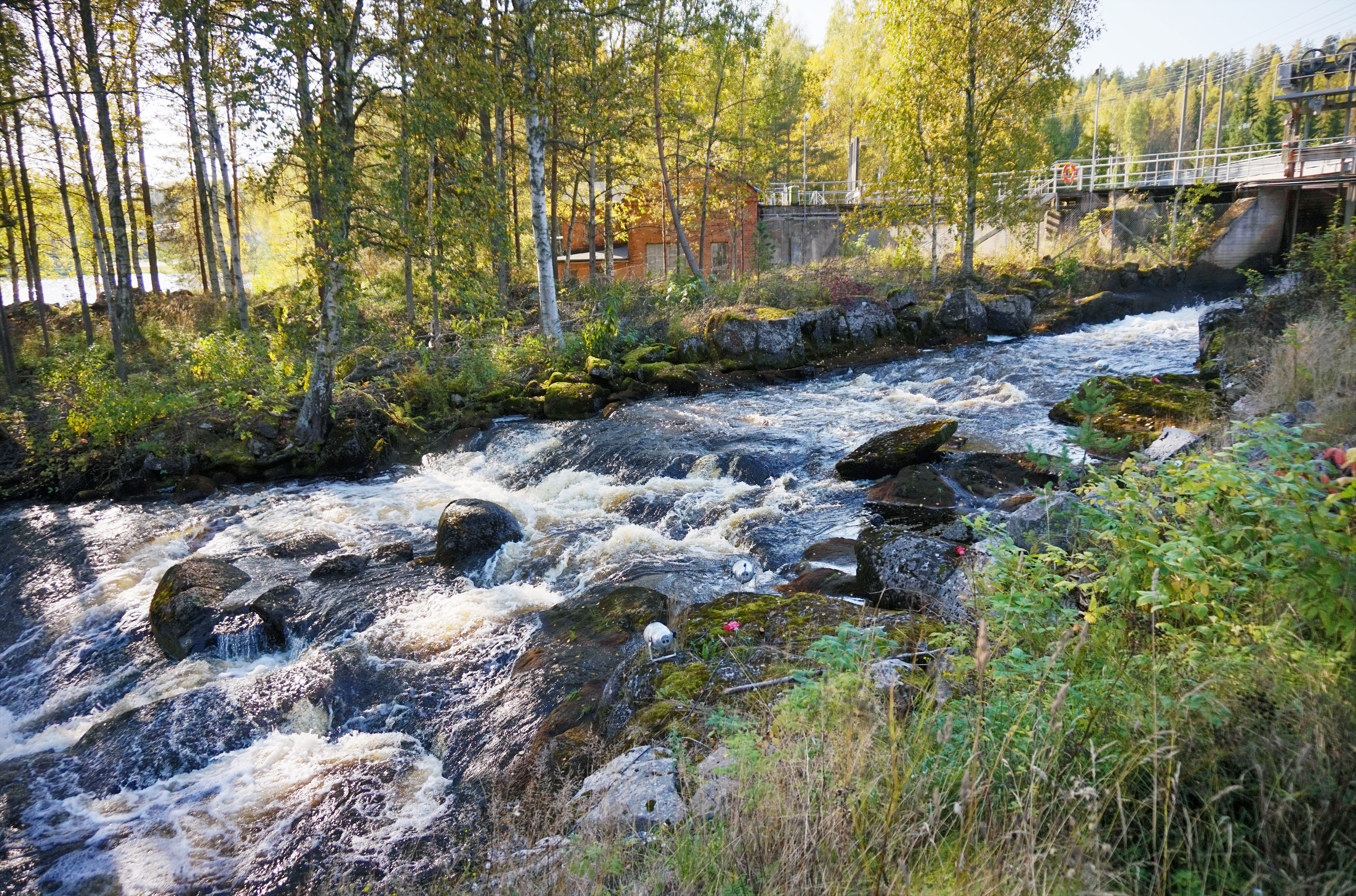
The Naiskoski rapids.

The bay in the northwestern part of the lake is called Viikinlahti, which is about two hectares in size. It was once isolated by the factory line of the industrial area. Today, the former railway is a light traffic route and a wooden footbridge crosses the mouth of the bay. The southern and southwestern shores of Koskikeskinen are dominated by the industrial environment of Jämsänkoski. Right on the southern shore of Koskikeskinen is the factory company's old clubhouse and a red brick paper warehouse.

== West bank ==
On the west bank of Koskikeskinen is Pässinmäki, where art exhibitions are organized. The historic industrial environment of Naiskoski and Rekolankoski, where power plants and old factories have been converted into restaurants, is located on the lake's northern shore. There is a small residential area on the western side of the lake. The highway 56 crosses the Rekolankoski, while Patalankoski is crossed by the oldest bridge in the industrial area.
