= Häme Province =

Former province of Finland

Häme Province Hämeen lääni Tavastehus län
- Province of Finland
- 1831–1997
- Coat of arms
- Capital: Hämeenlinna
- Area
  - Coordinates: 61.0000°N 24.4414°E
  - 1 January 1993: 22,246 km^{2} (8,589 sq mi)
- Population
  - 1 January 1993: 688,200
- History
  - Established: 1831
  - Disestablished: 1997
Preceded by	Succeeded by
County of Nyland and Tavastehus	Western Finland; Southern Finland

Häme Province (Finnish: Hämeen lääni, Swedish: Tavastehus län), or Tavastia, was a province of Finland from 1831 to 1997.

In 1997 the southern parts with Kanta-Häme, Päijät-Häme was merged with the province of Uusimaa and Kymi into the new province of Southern Finland. The northern part with Pirkanmaa was merged with the provinces of Vaasa, Central Finland, Turku and Pori into the new province of Western Finland.

The province corresponds roughly to the current regions of Kanta-Häme, Päijät-Häme and Pirkanmaa.

== Maps ==
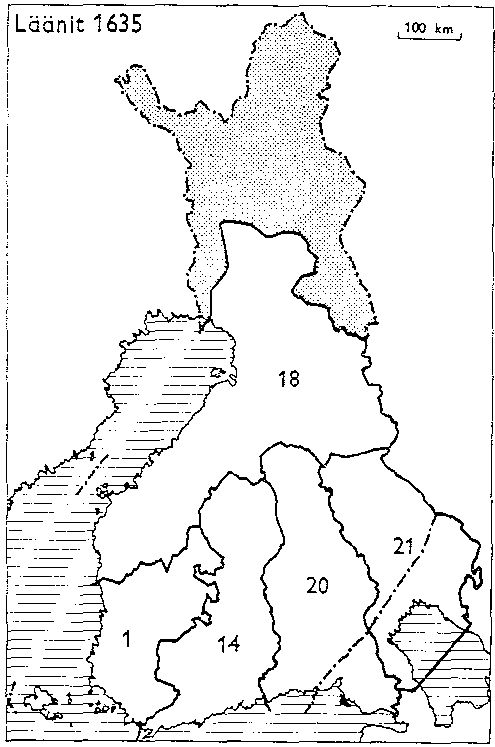
Provinces of Finland 1634: 1: Turku and Pori, 14: Nyland and Tavastehus, 18: Ostrobothnia, 20: Viborg and Nyslott, 21: Kexholm

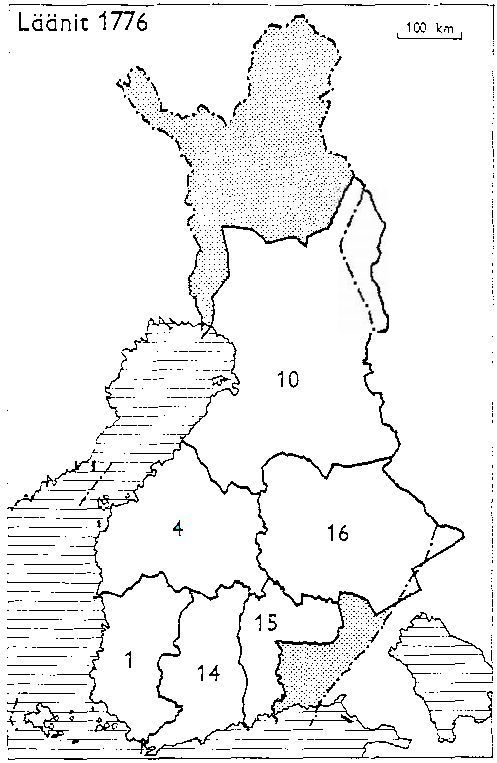
Provinces of Finland 1776: 1: Turku and Pori, 4: Vaasa, 10: Oulu, 14: Nyland and Tavastehus, 15: Kymmenegård, 16: Savolax and Karelia

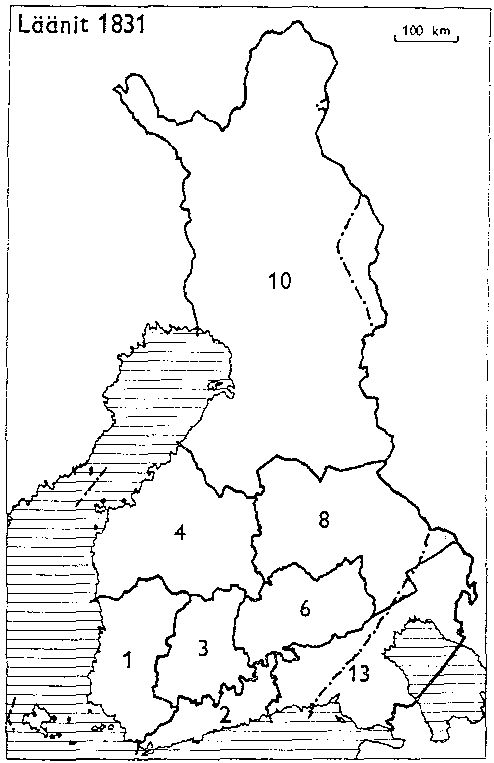
Provinces of Finland 1831: 1: Turku and Pori, 2: Uusimaa, 3: Häme, 4: Vaasa, 6: Mikkeli, 8: Kuopio, 10: Oulu, 13: Viipuri

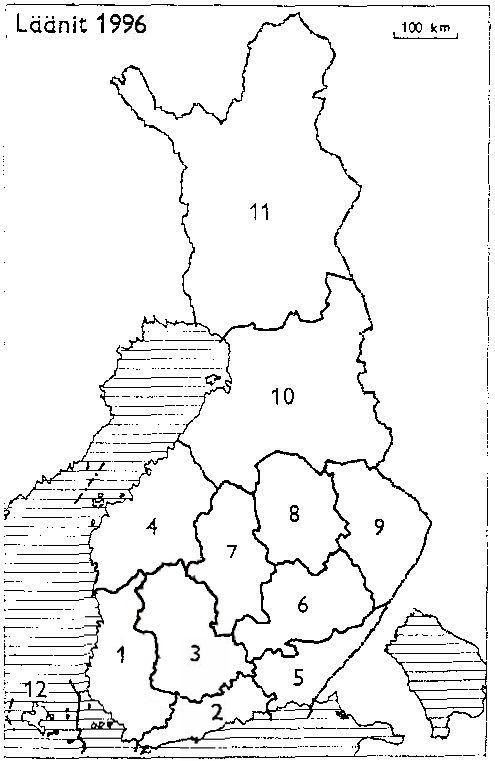
Provinces of Finland 1996: 1: Turku and Pori, 2: Uusimaa, 3: Häme, 4: Vaasa, 5: Kymi, 6: Mikkeli, 7: Central Finland, 8: Kuopio, 9: Northern Karelia, 10: Oulu, 11: Lapland, 12: Åland

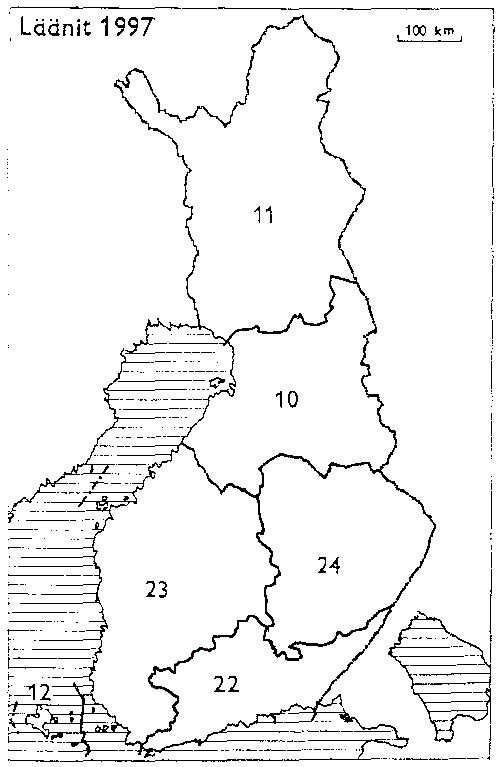
Provinces of Finland 1997: 10: Oulu, 11: Lapland, 12: Åland, 22: Southern Finland, 23: Western Finland, 24: Eastern Finland

== Municipalities in 1997 (cities in bold) ==
- Asikkala
- **Forssa**
- Hattula
- Hauho
- Hausjärvi
- Hollola
- Humppila
- Hämeenkoski
- Hämeenkyrö
- **Hämeenlinna**
- **Ikaalinen**
- Janakkala
- Jokioinen
- Juupajoki
- Kalvola
- Kangasala
- Kihniö
- Kuhmalahti
- Kuorevesi
- Kuru
- Kylmäkoski
- Kärkölä
- **Lahti**
- Lammi
- Lempäälä
- Loppi
- Luopioinen
- Längelmäki
- Mouhijärvi
- **Mänttä**
- Nastola
- **Nokia**
- **Orivesi**
- Padasjoki
- **Parkano**
- Pirkkala
- Pälkäne
- Renko
- **Riihimäki**
- Ruovesi
- Sahalahti
- Tammela
- **Tampere**
- **Toijala**
- Tuulos
- Urjala
- **Valkeakoski**
- Vesilahti
- Viiala
- Viljakkala
- Vilppula
- **Virrat**
- Ylöjärvi
- Ypäjä

== Former municipalities (disestablished before 1997) ==
- Aitolahti
- Akaa (re-established 2007)
- Eräjärvi
- Hämeenlinnan mlk
- Koijärvi
- Messukylä
- Pohjaslahti
- Somerniemi
- Sääksmäki
- Teisko
- Tottijärvi
- Tyrväntö
- Vanaja

== Governors ==
- Carl Klick 1831
- Johan Fredrik Stichaeus 1831–1841
- J. V. Snellman 1831 (acting)
- Carl Otto Rehbinder 1841–1863
- Samuel Werner von Troil 1863–1865
- Clas Herman Molander 1865–1869
- Hjalmar (Sebastian) Nordenstreng 1870–1875
- Edvard (Reinhold) von Ammondt 1875–1887
- Torsten Costiander 1887–1895
- Edvard Boehm 1895–1899
- Gustaf Axel von Kothen 1900–1901
- Isidor Svertschkoff 1901–1904
- Alexander Pappkoff 1904–1906
- Ivar (Sune) Gordie 1906–1910
- Arthur Brofeldt 1910–1911 (acting)
- Rafael Knut Harald Spåre 1911–1917
- Kustaa Adolf Saarinen 1917–1918 (acting)
- Antti Tulenheimo 1918–1919
- Albert von Hellens 1919–1930
- Sigurd Mattsson 1930–1959
- Jorma Tuominen 1959–1972
- Valdemar Sandelin 1973–1979
- Risto Tainio 1979–1994
- Kaarina Suonio 1994–1997
