= Jussila =

Jussila is a Finnish surname. Notable people with the surname include:

- Asko Jussila (born 1963), Finnish football manager
- Eetu Jussila (1882–1973), Finnish farmer and politician
- Esko Jussila (born 1934), Finnish skier
- Kustaa Jussila (1879–1964), Finnish farmer and politician
- Mauno Jussila (1908–1988), Finnish politician
- Osmo Jussila (1938–2019), Finnish historian
- Roope Jussila (1943–2013), Finnish diplomat
