= Battle of Länkipohja =

16 March 1918 battle of the Finnish Civil War

- Part of the Finnish Civil War
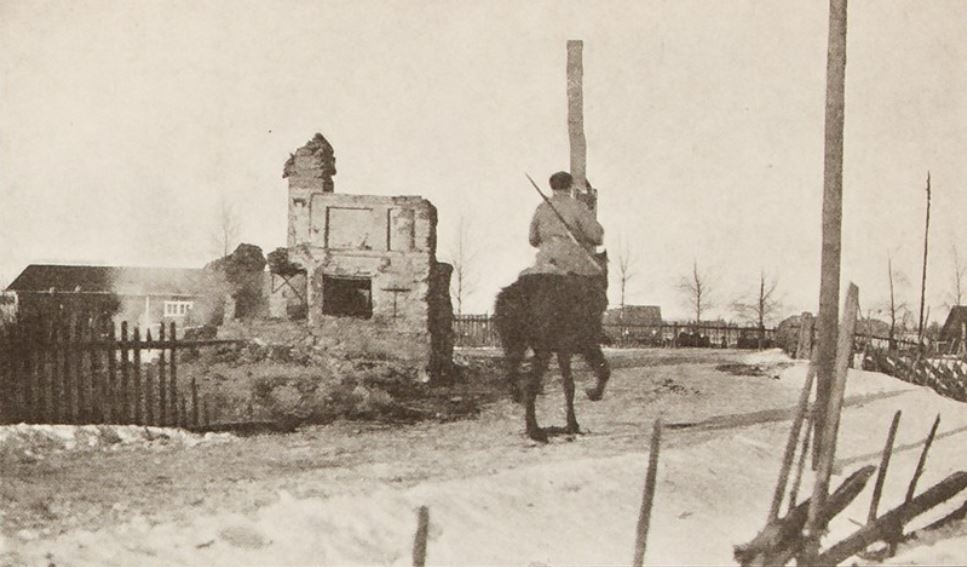
- A White cavalryman passing the ruins of a house.
Date	16 March 1918
Location	Längelmäki, Finland 61°44′09″N 24°47′44″E
Result	White victory

Belligerents
Finnish Whites	Finnish Reds

Commanders and leaders
K. F. Wilkman; Torsten Aminoff; Oskar Wilkman; Aarne Heikinheimo	Eino Siukola; Vihtori Hurri (WIA); Leander Viljanen †

Strength
2,500	c. 1,000

Casualties and losses
37 killed	20–60 killed in the battle, at least 70–100 executed
- Location within Finland

The Battle of Länkipohja (Finnish pronunciation: [ˈlæŋkiˌpohjɑ]) was a Finnish Civil War battle fought in the village of Länkipohja (now part of the Jämsä municipality) on 16 March 1918 between the Finnish Whites and the Finnish Reds. Together with the battles fought in Kuru, Ruovesi and Vilppula between 15 and 18 March, the Battle of Länkipohja was one of the first military operations related to the Battle of Tampere, which was the decisive battle of the Finnish Civil War. The battle is known for its bloody aftermath as the Whites executed 70–100 capitulated Reds. One of the executions was photographed and the images have become some of the best known pictures of the Finnish Civil War.

== Background ==
The village of Länkipohja is located by the Tampere–Jyväskylä highway, 60 kilometers northeast of Tampere which was the main base for Red Guards on the Tavastia Front. The Reds took control in Länkipohja on 10 February. It was one of the northernmost areas occupied by the Reds. Their intention was to proceed to the town of Jyväskylä in Central Finland and reach the Haapamäki–Jyväskylä and Jyväskylä–Pieksämäki railways. As the Whites launched their offensive against Tampere, Länkipohja's location was strategically important as the village closed the way to the town.

Preceding clashes occurred on 12 March, as 360 men of the Red Guards from Urjala, Jämsä and Hämeenlinna attacked the village of Eväjärvi, 9 kilometres north of Länkipohja, but the offensive failed. At the same time, a White Guard unit from Kuortane invaded Länkipohja from the east. They were pushed back as the Reds returned from Eväjärvi. Several Reds were killed and the local Red commander Vihtori Hurri was severely wounded, but the Whites had no fatalities.

== Battle ==
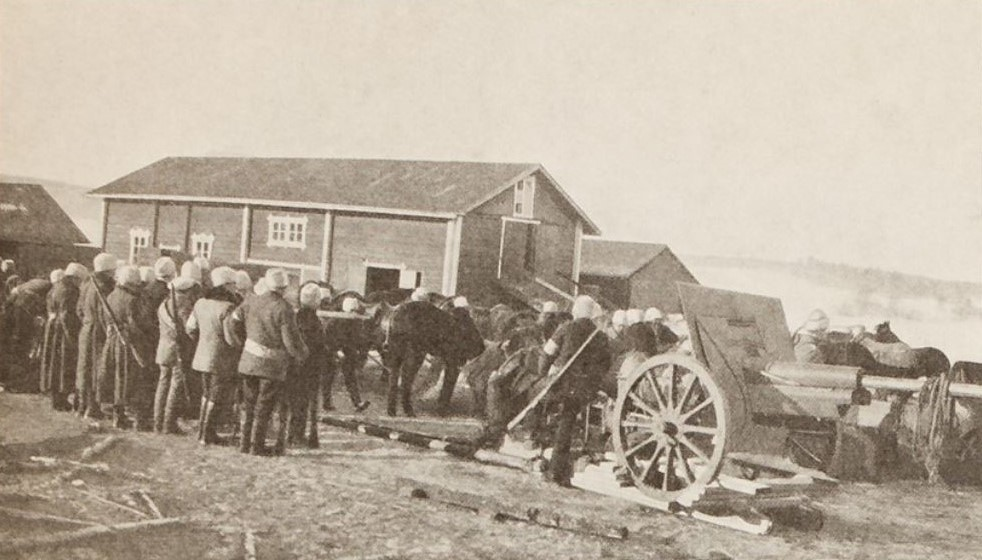
White Army briefing in the morning.

As the White Army launched their major offensive against Tampere, their plan was to take Länkipohja, then attack Orivesi 25 kilometres west of Länkipohja and cut the Tampere–Haapamäki railway. The White troops were commanded by the colonel K. F. Wilkman. The 2,500-men regiment was divided into three battalions which were led by the major Torsten Aminoff, rittmeister Oskar Wilkman and captain Aarne Heikinheimo. They were supported by an artillery battery commanded by the Swedish volunteer Nils Palme and a reserve battalion under the command of the major Sixten Öberg.

The number of Red Guard fighters in Länkipohja is unknown, but most likely there were about 1,000 Reds. The Swedish count Archibald Douglas, who fought for the Whites, estimated about 2,000 fighters. According to the Red commander Vihtori Hurri, a couple of days before the battle the number of Reds was only 552. The Red Guards came from the nearby villages of Längelmäki, Jämsä and Orivesi, and from the southern Finland from Urjala, Hämeenlinna, Tuusula, Kerava, Mäntsälä, Espoo and Helsinki. The Helsinki Red Guard had sent its famous A-komppania (the "A Company"). It was one of the Red elite units, composed of strength sports athletes and gymnasts.

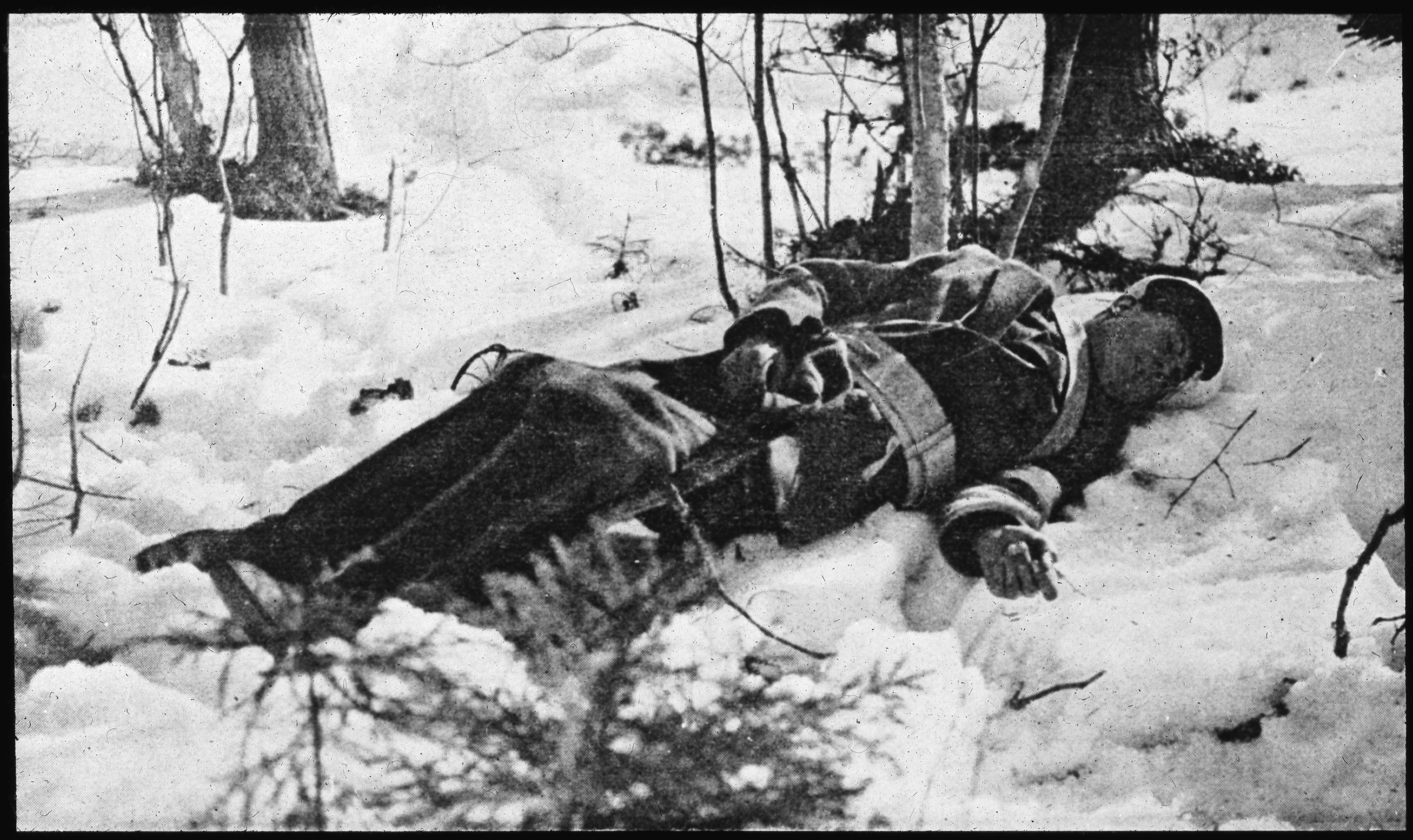
A White soldier killed in the battle.

The Reds were aware of the oncoming offensive. For example, the newspaper Työmies wrote a day before how the Whites had gathered their troops in the Länkipohja area. In the night before the battle, a large number of civilians fled the village. The Reds had built their main defensive line to the Hirsikangas Hill, two kilometres north of Länkipohja. They had felled a large number of trees, then piled the cut logs on both sides of the road and soaked them with water. In the below zero temperature, the stacks of wood were now covered by thick ice. The structure extended more than 50 meters on both sides of the road. As the trees in the slopes were cut, the attacking Whites had to cross a wide open ground covered in deep snow.

The Whites attacked Länkipohja from three directions; rittmeister Wilkman from north, major Aminoff from east and captain Heikinheimo from west. The White offensive was launched at 7 AM with heavy artillery fire. The shelling destroyed several buildings in both Länkipohja and the nearby village of Vilkkilä where the Heikinheimo battalion was to strike. Most of the Reds remained in the village. The defensive post on Hirsikangas Hill was occupied by only 80 fighters of the Tuusula and Helsinki Red Guards. The Urjala Red Guard was placed behind them, while the rest were defending the eastern and western flanks. The Aminoff battalion, which attacked from east, was stopped in a less than an hour as well as the Heikinheimo battalion in Vilkkilä, two kilometres west of Länkipohja. The Wilkman battalion attacking the main defensive line was forced to retreat at 10 AM. With the help of Öhman reserves, Wilkman soon launched a new offensive and finally reached the Red positions. The battle was now fought with bayonets and knives and the outnumbered Reds were forced to retreat. The wounded Reds remaining in the defensive posts were killed.

As the Red defense collapsed, Wilkman was now able to enter Länkipohja, only to be hit by their own men as the Aminoff battalion mistook them for Reds. Finally the Whites took the village at 3 PM as the Reds fled south across the frozen lake Längelmävesi. After Länkipohja was lost, the only remaining Reds were now the 300 fighters of Tuusula Red Guard who were still resisting in Vilkkilä. The Wilkman battalion attacked from their rear and the battle was over in the late afternoon. Most of the Reds managed to flee, but about 100 surrendered believing that they would be treated as prisoners of war. However, all the surrendered Reds were executed. Leander Viljanen, the commander of the Tuusula Red Guard, hid from the Whites and committed suicide the next day.

== Executions and casualties ==
The executions started immediately after the fighting ceased. They were carried out by the battalions of Oskar Wilkman and Sixten Öberg. The firing squads were led by the Jäger officers Bjarne Wegelius and Jarl Wegelius. The number of executed is estimated between 70 and 100, including several local civilians. The number of Reds killed in the battle is estimated 20–60. The White casualties were 37 men, including two Swedish volunteers.

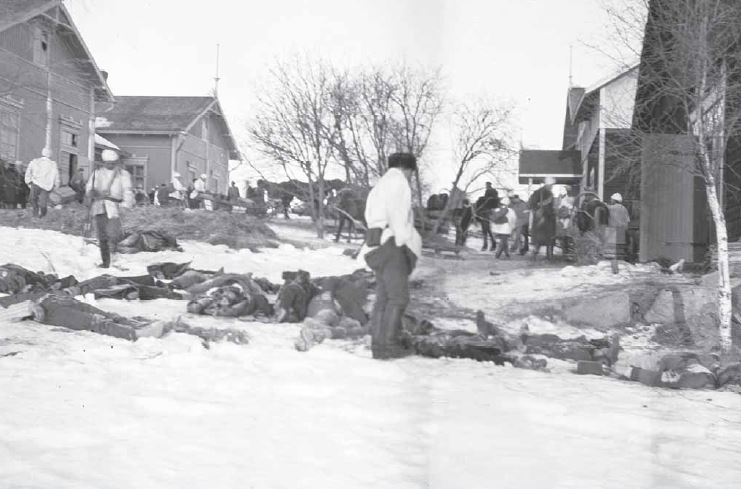
Executed Reds in Vilkkilä after the battle.

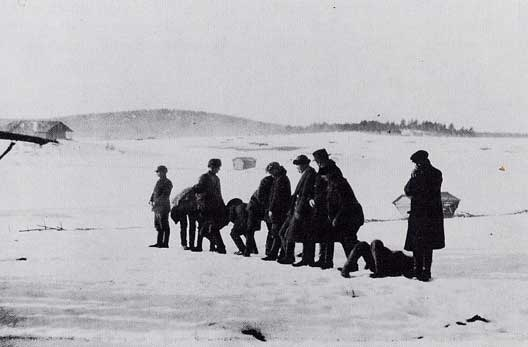
A White firing squad executes Red prisoners (photo taken by Harald Netvig).

== Natvig photographs ==
The battle was photographed by the Norwegian Red Cross medic Harald Natvig. His images on the Finnish Civil War are featured in the book Fra den finske frihedskrig 1918: Vestarméen, published in late 1918. In Länkipohja, Natvig also took a series of three photographs on the execution of 13 surrendered Red Guard fighters, who were found hiding in a basement and shot on 17 March. The first image shows the firing squad preparing for the execution, the second shows the Red Guard fighters being hit by bullets, and the last one shows a White officer giving a death blow to a suffering victim. The last two images of the series are among the best-known images of the Finnish Civil War.

== Commemoration ==
The memorial of the fallen Whites was erected in 1938 by the Hirsikangas Hill. Next to the present-day National road 9 is the memorial of two killed Whites, father Matti Laurila and son Ilmari Laurila. Fallen and executed Reds were buried in a mass grave by the Längelmäki Church. The memorial was erected in 1946.
