= Koskenpää =

- Former municipality
- Koskenpään kunta Koskenpää kommun
- Coat of arms

- Location of Koskenpää in Finland
- Coordinates: 62.0812515°N 25.1424508°E
- Country: Finland
- Region: Central Finland
- Established: 1926
- Merged into Jämsänkoski: 1969
- Seat: Koskenpään kirkonkylä

Area
  - Land: 352.5 km^{2} (136.1 sq mi)

Population (1968-12-31)
  - Total: 1,980

Koskenpää is a village and former municipality of Finland in the Central Finland region. It was consolidated with Jämsänkoski in 1969, which in turn was consolidated with Jämsä in 2009.

It bordered Jämsänkoski, Jämsä, Kuorevesi, Keuruu, Petäjävesi and Korpilahti. The distance to Jämsä is roughly 26 kilometres (16 mi).

== Geography ==
=== Villages ===
Villages include:

- Koskenpää or Koskenpään kirkonkylä
- Kalmavirta
- Sahloinen
- Hankaperä
- Lylyniemi
- Mäkikylä

=== Lakes ===
Significant lakes include Iso Rautavesi, Kalmavesi and Salosvesi.

== History ==
The history of Koskenpää is deeply connected to the history of Jämsä. The area was originally a part of the Jämsä parish and the name Koskenpää originally referred to the parts of the parish beyond the Jämsänkoski rapids. It was also known as Koskenpäällystä.

The idea of separating Koskenpää from Jämsä appeared in the 1880s due to Koskenpää's distance from Jämsä proper. Koskenpää was defined as a chapel community in 1901, which became a separate parish in 1912. The municipality was formed later in 1926 along with Jämsänkoski.

Koskenpään Tervatehdas Oy, a tar production factory, was founded in 1909 and was closed in the 50s. It also produced charcoal and turpentine.

Koskenpää was consolidated with Jämsänkoski in 1969, while Jämsänkoski was consolidated with Jämsä in 2009. The area of the former Koskenpää municipality has its own village association, Koskenpää ry.

== Services ==
There are over 30 businesses in Koskenpää.

=== Sauna production ===
The barrel-shaped sauna (tynnyrisauna) was invented in Koskenpää by Esko Niinimäki, who converted a large barrel from the defunct tar factory into a sauna. This sauna became an attraction and soon the production of barrel saunas was started in Koskenpää. Tynnyrimökit Oy still produces barrel saunas in the area of Koskenpää.

=== Education ===
Koskenpää has one school covering classes 1 to 6 (ala-aste). Grades 7-9 attend the Jämsänkoski school instead.

=== Travel ===
Like many other smaller settlements in Central Finland, Koskenpää has many summer homes, both private and rentable.
