= Hallinportti Aviation Museum =

- Hallinportin ilmailumuseo
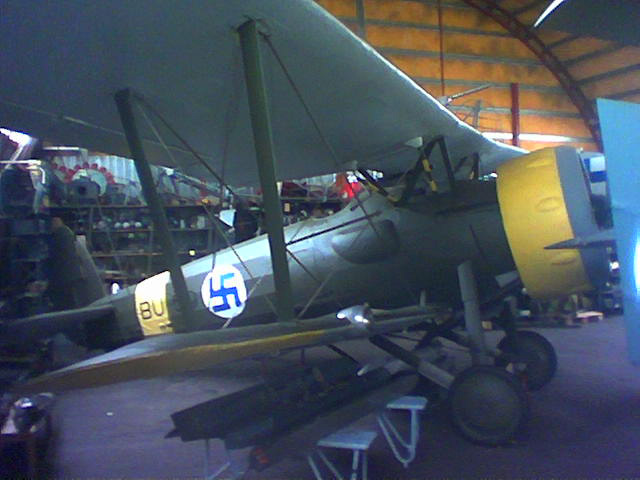
- A Bristol Bulldog at Hallinportti

- Location within Finland
- Location: Halli Airport, Kuorevesi, Jämsä, Finland
- Coordinates: 61°51′26″N 024°49′16″E
- Type: Aviation museum
- Website: www.museo24.fi

The Hallinportti Aviation Museum (Finnish: Hallinportin ilmailumuseo) is an aviation museum, located at Halli Airport in Kuorevesi, Jämsä, Finland.

== Aircraft ==
- MiG-15 UTI
- IVL D.26 Haukka II
- Bristol Bulldog IV
- Aero A-11
- Rumpler 6B
- VL Sääski II
- Caudron G.3
- a wide collection of aviation equipment
