= Aarne Heikinheimo =

Aarne Silvio Heikinheimo
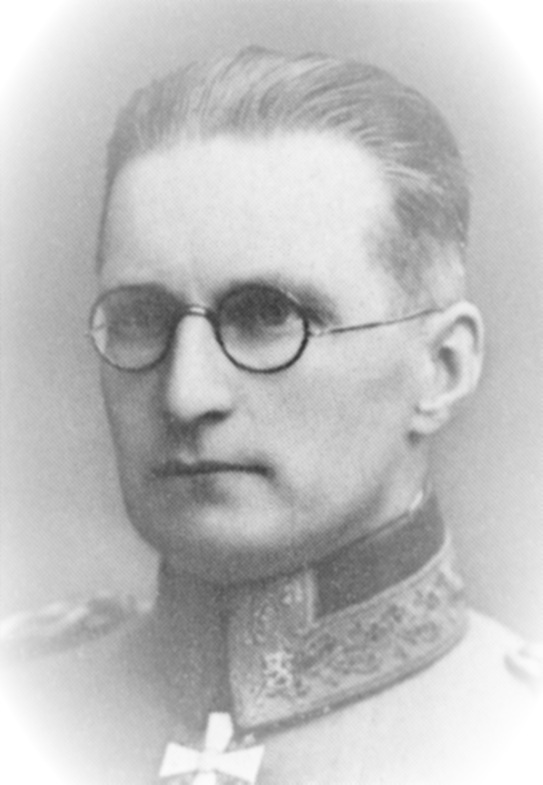
- Born: March 20, 1894; Tornio, Lapland, Grand Duchy of Finland
- Died: January 24, 1938 (aged 43); Harakka, Finland
- Burial place: Oulu Cemetery, Oulu, Finland
- Military career
- Allegiance: German Empire; Finnish Whites; Finland
- Branch: Imperial German Army; Finnish Army
- Service years: 1918 — 1938
- Rank: Major General of Prison
- Conflicts: World War I; Finnish Civil War; Battle of Länkipohja

Aarne Silvio Heikinheimo (March 20, 1894 – January 24, 1938) was a Finnish Major General. He is well known for his service in the Finnish Civil War against the Red Guards.

== Biography ==
=== Early life ===
Heikinheimo was born on March 20, 1894, in Tornio. His parents were chief forester Johan Henrik Heikel and Sally Armida Thauvón. He was married in 1919 to Sylvi Amalia Jurvelius. Heikinheimo enrolled as a student at the Finnish Co-educational School in Oulu in 1913 and joined the North Ostrobothnian Association. He continued his studies at the Department of Mechanical Engineering of the Helsinki University of Technology in 1913 to 1914. He followed teaching at the Military Academy Commander's Course in 1925 and attended the General Department of the Military Academy from 1926 to 1927.

=== World War I ===
Heikinheimo was one of the first volunteers to aim for a Pfadfinder military training course in Germany in the Lockstedter Lager training area in Northern Germany. He enrolled in the camp on February 25, 1915. He was placed in the 1st Company of the group. He was later stationed in the Royal, Prussian Jaeger Battalion in the 1st Company of the 27th. He took part in the fighting in the First World War on the eastern front of Germany on the Misse, the Gulf of Riga and the Aa. He attended the motorboat driver and machine gun station courses in Libya in the summer of 1917 and the car course in Schaulen in August 1917 and the blasting course in Libya in the autumn of 1917.

=== Finnish Civil War ===
He arrived in Finland with the command of the oberzugführer Friedel Jacobsson on January 30, 1918, and joined the Perä-Pohjola Conservation Corps in Tervola. He was seconded as a team leader in the battles against Tervola and Tornio. After the conquests of Tervola and Tornio, he was appointed Commander of the City of Kemi on February 7, until on March 5, he was appointed Commander of the Perä-Pohjola Battalion . He led his battalion to battles in Vilkkilä, Haavisto (Orivesi), Tervaniemi, Lempäälä, Vesilahti, Karku and Tyrvää. In the final stages of the Civil War, he was given the task of forming a regiment in Eastern Uusimaa in Lahti.

=== Life after the Civil War and death ===
After the Civil War, Heikinheimo was appointed Adjutant of the 1st Division as of July 1, 1918, and later interim Chief of Staff, from which he was transferred on 15 August 1918 as Commander of the Finnish White Guard I Battalion and further Commander on September 11, 1918, to the Vyborg Regiment II Battalion. Heikinheimo served as Chairman of the 2nd Division Court of Honor in 1920 and as Chairman of the 3rd Division Court of Honor in 1921 and 1925. He served as a member of the Bicycle Special Committee in 1922 He served as a member of the Winter Equipment Committee in 1924 and as chairman of the Field Equipment Committee from 1931 to 1934, and as chairman of the Bylaws Committee in 1934. He served as a member of the Mikkeli City Parish's extended church council from 1933 to 1934. He was promoted to commander of the Second Bicycle Battalion on April 27, 1921, and to commander of the Viborg Regiment on August 15, 1924. From August 12, 1926, he served as commander in the Jääkäri Brigade, from where he was promoted to Division 3 on June 9, and was assigned as an infantry inspector. He died accidentally in test firing at Harakka after the explosion of a grenade launcher pipe on January 24, 1938. He has been buried in Intiö Cemetery in Oulu, right next to the heroes' graves.

== Bibliography ==
- Publications of the Military History Office of the Ministry of Defense IV, Biography of Finnish Jaegers, WSOY Porvoo 1938.
- Publications of the Department of Military Science XIV, Biography of Finnish Jaegers 1975, Vaasa 1975 ISBN 951-99046-8-9.
