= Reidar Hedman =

Finnish educator and politician

Lennart Reidar Armas Hedman (17 June 1896 Vanaja – 26 October 1961 in Tullinge, Stockholm County, Sweden) was a Finnish educator, eugenicist and far-right politician. He had a master's degree in philosophy. He had studied genetics at the University of Helsinki under Harry Federley.

Reidar Hedman was the director of the Perttula Education Institute for the Feeble-Minded, the first Finnish-language developmental disability institution founded by his father Edvin Hedman, in 1927–1944. Hedman specialized in eugenics and racial hygiene and supported a comprehensive forced sterilization program for the mentally handicapped. Hedman believed that human intelligence was the basis of all spiritual life and could not be elevated through education, for example.

== Politics ==
Hedman was one of the founders of the Patriotic People's Movement (IKL).

During the Continuation War, he was one of the main recruiters for his Finnish SS battalion. He represented the Nazi wing of the IKL, which criticized the passivity of the IKL leadership during the war and called for it to give way to the more radical forces. According to Hedman, the IKL should radicalize into an openly Nazi party.

Hedman's supporters in the IKL politicians included Aarne Kauhtio, Editor-in-Chief of Hämeen Sanomat, Yrjö Saarinen, Kustaa Jussila and Hilja Riipinen.

After the Moscow armistice of 1944, Hedman moved to Germany, where he lectured on eugenics to Finnish SS men who remained in Germany.

Hedman died in Sweden in 1961.
