= Länkipohja =

Village in Jämsä, Finland

Coordinates: 61°43′44″N 024°47′17″E

Länkipohja (Finnish pronunciation: [ˈlæŋkiˌpohjɑ]) is a locality in Jämsä, Finland, located by the lake Längelmävesi. It was the administrative center of the municipality of Längelmäki, which was divided between Jämsä and Orivesi in 2007.

== History ==
The village of Länkipohja was populated in the early 16th century and was mentioned as Lengellmapohia, a transcription of the original name, Längelmäpohja, in 1560. The name Längelmäpohja was used until the 18th century, when the current name Länkipohja appears.

It is known of the 1918 Finnish Civil War Battle of Länkipohja. The Länkipohja railway station was opened in 1948 as the first part of the Orivesi–Jyväskylä railway was completed. It was closed in 1987.
