= Haapasalo =

Haapasalo is a Finnish surname. Notable people with the surname include:

- Alli Haapasalo (born 1977), Finnish filmmaker
- Kreeta Haapasalo (1813–1893), Finnish musician
- Mimmi Haapasalo (1881–1970), Finnish salesperson and politician
- Ville Haapasalo (born 1972), Finnish actor
