= Halli Airport =

Halli Airport Hallin lentoasema
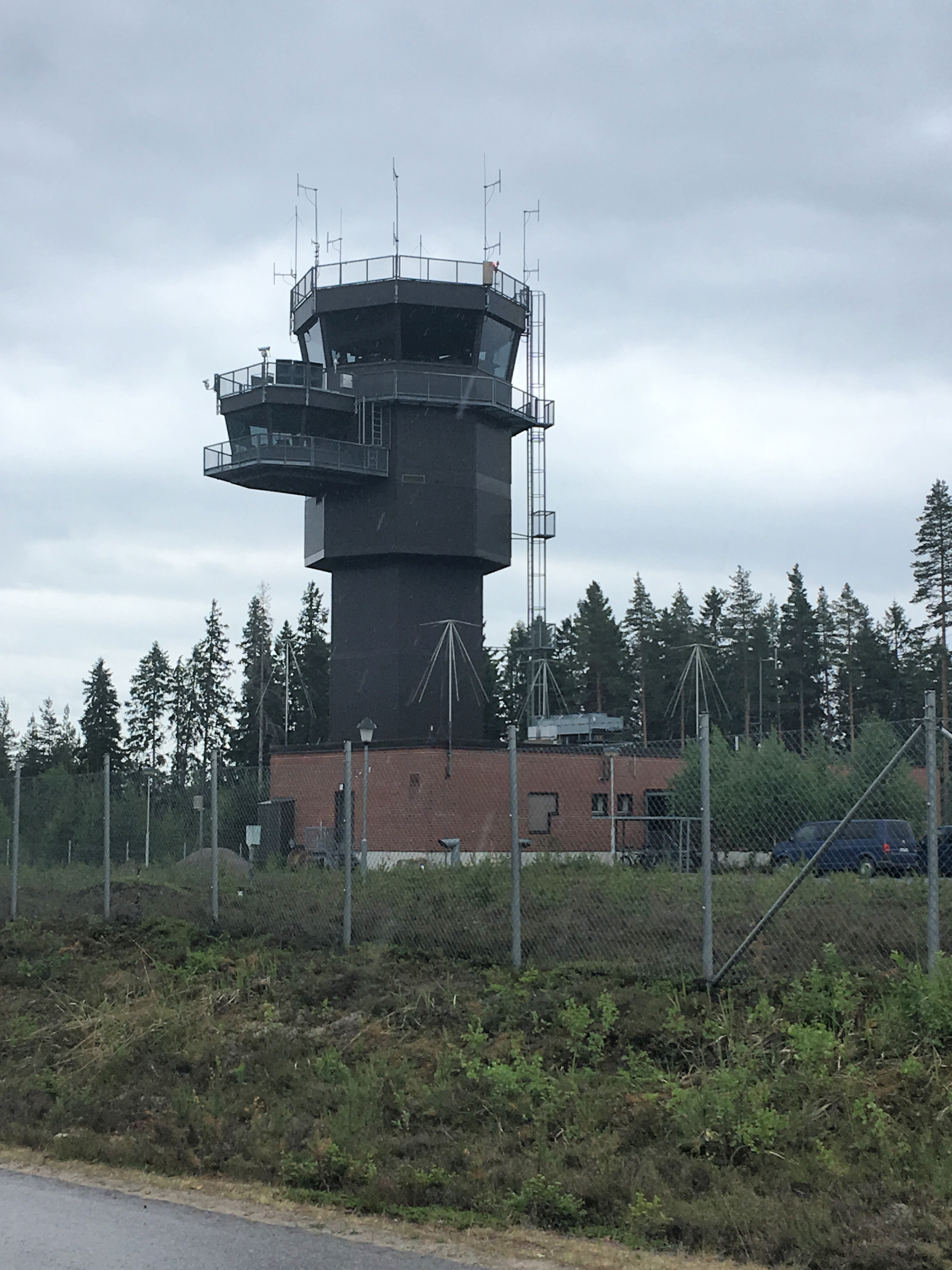
- IATA: KEV; ICAO: EFHA

Summary
- Airport type: Military
- Operator: Finavia, Finnish Defence Forces
- Location: Kuorevesi, Jämsä, Finland
- Elevation AMSL: 481 ft (147 m)
- Coordinates: 61°51′23″N 024°47′21″E

Map
- Location within Finland

Runways
Direction	Length		Surface
Direction	m	ft	Surface
08/26	2,600	8,530	Asphalt

Statistics (2010)
- Passengers: 15
- Landings: 1,951
- Source: AIP Finland; Statistics from Finavia

Halli Airport (IATA: KEV, ICAO: EFHA) (Finnish: Hallin lentoasema) is a military airport located in Kuorevesi, Jämsä, Finland, 23 kilometres (14 mi) west of Jämsä town centre. The Aircraft and Weapon Systems Training Wing of the Finnish Air Force was based at the airport until the end of the year 2013, when it was disbanded. The Hallinportti Aviation Museum is located near the airport.

== See also ==
- List of the largest airports in the Nordic countries
