= Hämeenlinnan maalaiskunta =

- Former municipality
- Hämeenlinnan maalaiskunta Tavastehus landskommun
- Location of Hämeenlinnan mlk in Finland
- Country: Finland
- Province: Häme Province
- Region: Kanta-Häme
- Merged into Hämeenlinna, Vanaja and Renko: 1948
- Seat: Hätilä

Area
  - Land: 108.87 km^{2} (42.03 sq mi)

Population (1940)
  - Total: 3,276

Hämeenlinnan maalaiskunta (abbreviated as Hämeenlinnan mlk, Swedish: Tavastehus landskommun) is a former municipality of Finland in the former Häme Province, now in Kanta-Häme. It was split between Hämeenlinna, Vanaja and Renko in 1948.

== Geography ==
=== Villages ===
- Hätilä
- Järviöinen
- Kirstula
- Luhtiala
- Ojoinen
- Pikku-Parola
- Vuorentaka

These villages have mostly been absorbed by Hämeenlinna and are now districts of it.

== History ==
Division of the municipality

There was an Iron Age hillfort located in Luhtiala (Aulanko), which was demolished in the 13th century as the Häme Castle was built nearby.

The area was originally part of the Vanaja parish.

Ojoinen was first mentioned in 1329, while Hätilä was first mentioned in 1374. The nearby hill, nowadays used for military training, is known as Hätilänvuori. There is also a Hätilä in Tyrvää, most likely having some historical connection.

The town of Hämeenlinna was established in 1639. The "rural chapel community" of Hämeenlinna was established from the northernmost villages of Vanaja (see Villages) in 1778. It became a separate parish and municipality in 1904.

Aulanko was formed out of four farms in Luhtiala in 1927.

The municipality was dissolved in 1948. Parts of it were given to Hämeenlinna, Vanaja and Renko. Vanaja became a part of Hämeenlinna in 1967, while Renko became a part of it in 2009, therefore the territory of the former Hämeenlinnan maalaiskunta is now entirely within Hämeenlinna.

=== Coat of arms ===
As Hämeenlinnan mlk was dissolved before the 8th of April, 1949 (when rural municipalities were allowed to adopt coats of arms), it never had an official coat of arms. The artist Tapani Talari has designed an unofficial coat of arms (Note: Unofficial coats of arms are copyrighted material, therefore they cannot be uploaded onto Commons.) for Suomen Kuntaliitto ry.
