= Rengo (disambiguation) =

Rengo may refer to:

- Rengo, a city in Chile, located in the O'Higgins Region
- RENGO, an umbrella organization that represents the interests of union members in Japan
- Rengo (board game), a four-player variant of the board game Go
- Rengo Co., Ltd., a Japanese packaging company
- Renko (previously known as "Rengo"), a former municipality of Finland
