= Hegman =

Hegman is a surname. Notable people with the surname include:

- Bob Hegman (born 1958), American baseball player
- Mike Hegman (born 1953), American football player

== See also ==
- Hedman
- Hegman Lake Pictograph, Native American pictograph, located on Hegman Lake in Minnesota, USA
- Herman (name)
