= William Mäkinen =

Finnish ice hockey player

- Born: June 19, 1995 (age 29); Jamsankoski, Finland
- Height: 6 ft 0 in (183 cm)
- Weight: 174 lb (79 kg; 12 st 6 lb)
- Position: Defense
- Shoots: Left
- Mestis team Former teams: KeuPa HT; SaiPa
- NHL draft: Undrafted
- Playing career: 2014–present

William Mäkinen (born June 19, 1995) is a Finnish professional ice hockey player. He is currently playing for KeuPa HT of the Finnish Mestis.

Mäkinen made his Liiga debut playing with SaiPa during the 2014–15 Liiga season.
