= Aimo Jokinen =

Finnish cyclist

Personal information
- Born: 2 April 1931 Eräjärvi, Finland
- Died: 21 July 2014 (aged 83)

Cycling career
- Sport: Cycling

Aimo Jokinen (born 2 April 1931 – 21 July 2014) was a Finnish cyclist. He competed in the 4,000 metres team pursuit event at the 1952 Summer Olympics.
