= Kankarisvesi =

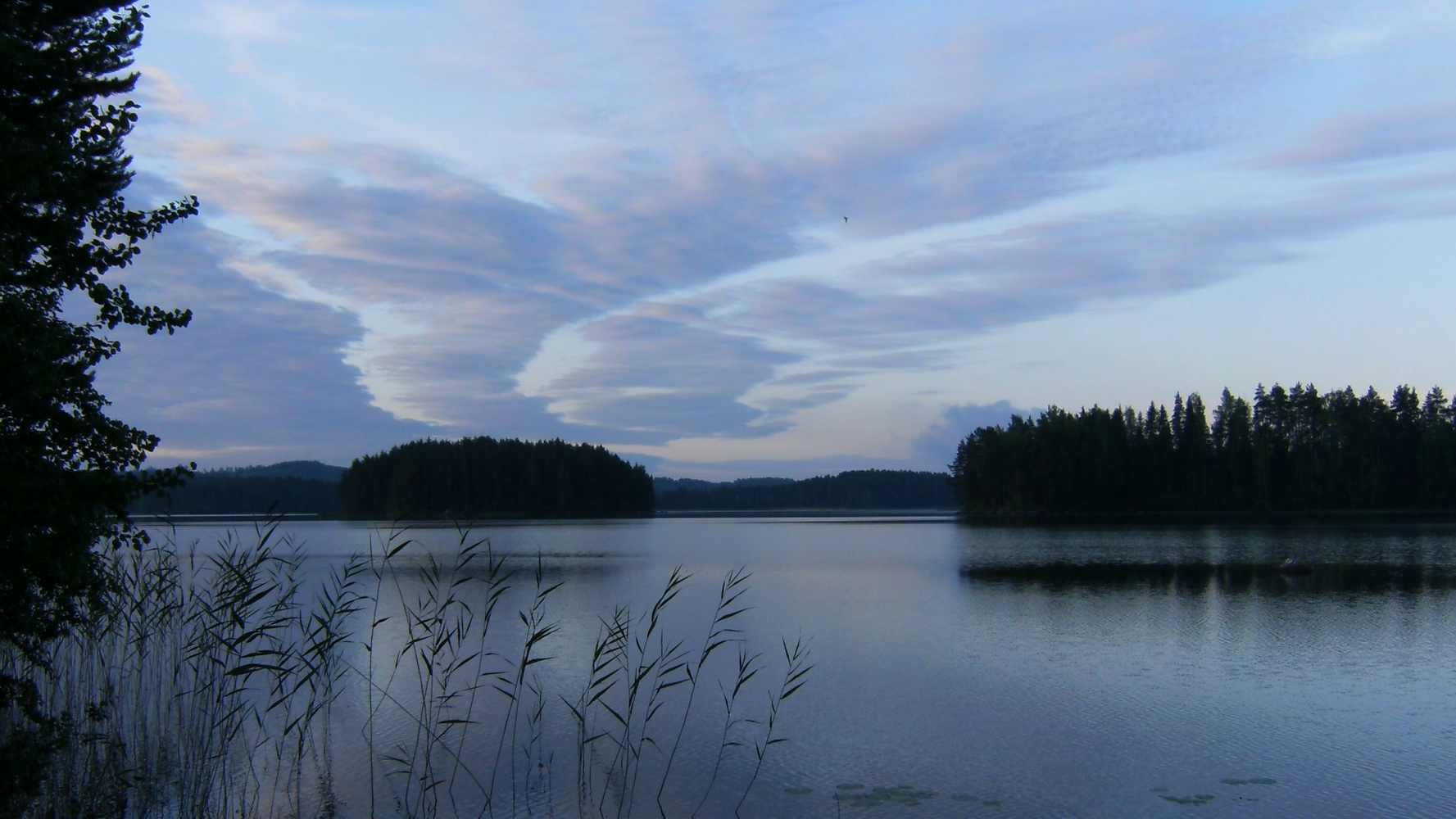

- Location within Finland
- Location: Jämsä
- Coordinates: 61°58′10″N 25°08′30″E
- Type: Lake
- Primary inflows: Luomenkoski rapids
- Primary outflows: Rekolankoski rapids, Jämsänjoki
- Catchment area: Kymijoki
- Basin countries: Finland
- Surface area: 8.292 km^{2} (3.202 sq mi)
- Average depth: 4.1 m (13 ft)
- Max. depth: 23.6 m (77 ft)
- Water volume: 0.034 km^{3} (28,000 acre⋅ft)
- Shore length^{1}: 62.46 km (38.81 mi)
- Surface elevation: 97.8 m (321 ft)
- Islands: Vihatinsalo
- Settlements: Luomenkylä
- ^{1} Shore length is not a well-defined measure.

Kankarisvesi is a rather small lake of Finland. It belongs to the Kymijoki main catchment area. It is located in Jämsä in the region of Keski-Suomi. It is also a part of Jämsä catchment area. The lake is narrow and about 10 kilometers long. It is a part of 75 kilometer canoeing route named Wanha Witonen from Petäjävesi to Arvaja on the lake Päijänne. The southern part of the lake is an area for sport rowing.

== See also ==
- List of lakes in Finland
