= Vanaja (Finland) =

Former municipality

- Former municipality
- Vanajan kunta Vånå kommun
- Coat of arms

- Location of Vanaja in the Häme Province
- Coordinates: 61°00′13″N 024°28′10″E
- Country: Finland
- Province: Häme Province
- Merged into Hattula, Hämeenlinna, Janakkala and Renko: 1967
- Seat: Hattelmala

Area
  - Land: 300.4 km^{2} (116.0 sq mi)

Population (1966-12-31)
  - Total: 6,636

Vanaja is a former municipality of Finland. It was located in Häme Province about 100 kilometres (60 mi) north of Helsinki. It is also speculated that it might have been the name for an Iron Age and early Middle Ages settlement found opposite to the Häme Castle.

The municipality bordered Hämeenlinna, Hattula, Hauho, Tuulos, Lammi, Janakkala and Renko. Before 1948, it bordered Hämeenlinnan maalaiskunta instead of Hattula.

== History ==
=== Iron Age Finnish settlement ===
Vanaja is a name commonly used about the excavation site of an Iron Age settlement in central Häme (Tavastia), Finland, opposite to the later Häme Castle in Varikonniemi. According to some interpretations it was a proto-urban settlement, but this is contested. The settlement existed roughly during the 6th to 13th centuries. It is possibly the "town of Vanai" mentioned once in a Novgorod chronicle that describes how it was destroyed by Novgorodian forces in 1311 CE.

The men of Novgorod went in war over sea to the country of the Germans, against the Finnish (Yem) people, with Prince Dmitri Romanovich and having crossed the sea they first occupied the Kupets ("Merchant") river, they burned villages, and captured people and destroyed the cattle. And there Konstantin the son of Ilya Stanimirovich was killed by a column that went in pursuit. They then took the whole of the Black river, and thus following along the Black river they reached the town of Vanai and they took the town and burned it. And the Germans fell back into the citadel. For the place was very strong and firm, on a high rock, not having access from any side. And they sent with greeting, asking for peace, but the men of Novgorod did not grant peace, and they stood three days and three nights wasting the district. They burned the large villages, laid waste all the cornfields, and did not leave a single horn of cattle; and going hence, they took the Kavgola river and the Perna river, and they came out on the sea and returned all well to Novgorod.

It has been suggested that the site was abandoned after the attack. As another possible result from the war, the present-day Häme Castle was built on the opposite shore of the Vanajavesi lake soon (some researchers, however, have dated the earliest building phase of the castle to the late 13th century). It took however more than 300 years before there was a town next to it again: Hämeenlinna was established 1639.

According to preliminary estimations, the site was about 5.5 hectares (14 acres), making it about half the size of the Björkö settlement in Sweden. Excavations have so far covered only a small fraction of the area, and its nature as a town-like settlement or just an ordinary rural site has been disputed. The site was found in 1986.

=== Vanaja afterwards ===
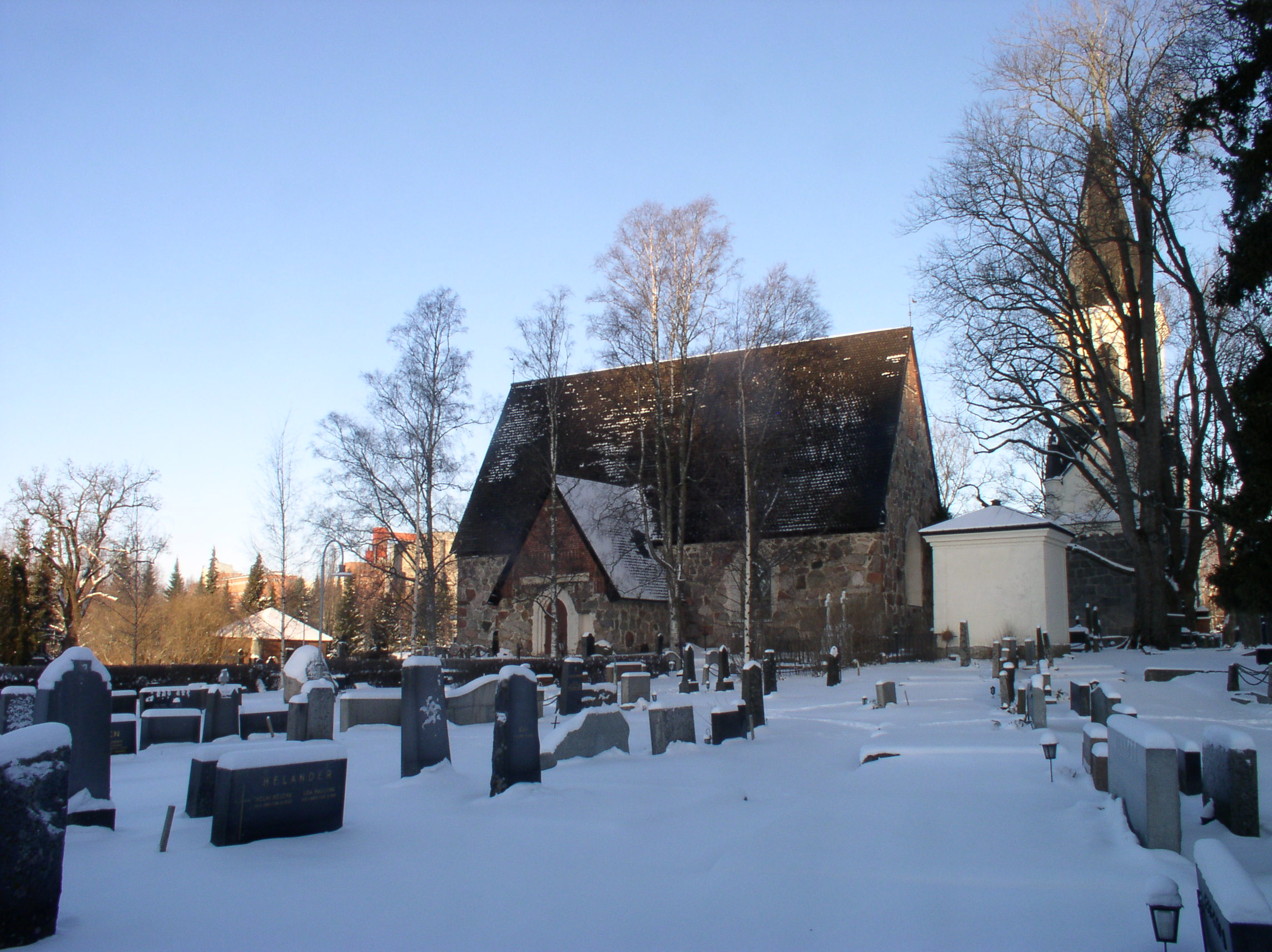
The medieval church of Vanaja

Vanaja (Swedish: Vånå) parish was first mentioned in 1324, 13 years after the Novgorod invasion.

The Vanaja parish used to cover all of the area around the Häme castle. The administrative division was also known as Mäskälä after the village of Mäskälä. The town of Hämeenlinna was established in 1639 around the castle. The two had separate parishes until they were merged in 1803, being separated again in 1904. At the same time, the territories of the Hämeenlinna parish that were not parts of the town itself became Hämeenlinnan maalaiskunta, which in 1948 was divided between Hämeenlinna, Vanaja and Renko. Vanaja was divided between Hämeenlinna, Janakkala, Renko and Hattula in 1967. Most of the municipality is now part of Hämeenlinna, as Renko was merged into Hämeenlinna in 2009.

The medieval church of Vanaja is located about 3 km (2 mi) south-east of the Iron Age settlement, on a cape, that may have served as the local place of sacrifice. The oldest Swedish name (Vaan-ö) of the municipality probably originated from the name of the cape, which during springtime floods used to be an island. There was an episcopal manor nearby in the 14th and 15th century.
