= Tyyne Salomaa =

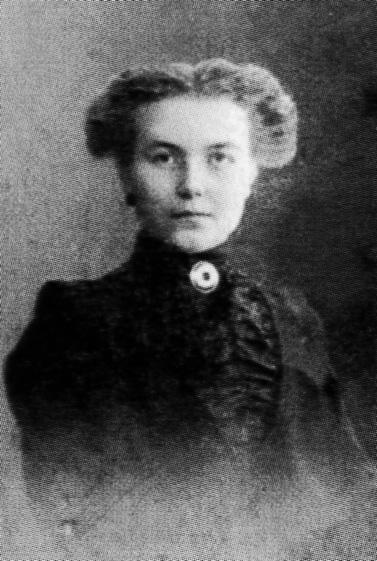
Tyyne Salomaa in the 1920s

Tyyne Siviä Salomaa (née Eriksson; 4 April 1891 – 26 February 1938; name as Soviet citizen Тюне Генриховна Саломаа) was a Finnish seamstress and politician. Born in Kuorevesi, she was a member of the Parliament of Finland from 1916 to 1917. During the Finnish Civil War in 1918, she sided with the Reds and after the defeat of the Red side went into exile in Soviet Russia. She joined the Communist Party of Finland (SKP) and the Communist Party of the Soviet Union and settled in the Karelian ASSR, where she worked as a teacher at a party school, as the director of an orphanage and in other functions. As one of the victims of the Great Purge, she was expelled from the Communist Party on 23 October 1937, arrested by the NKVD on 17 January 1938, sentenced to death and shot in Petrozavodsk on 26 February 1938. She was posthumously rehabilitated (exonerated) by Soviet authorities in 1957.
