= Immi Hellén =

Finnish poet (1861–1937)

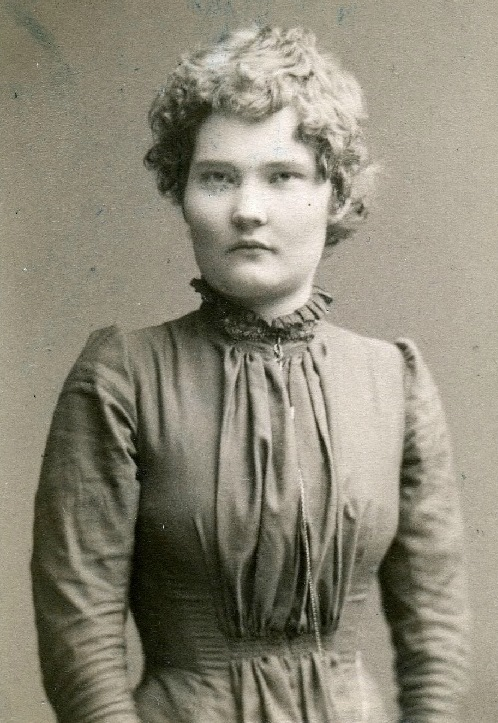
- Hellén in the early 1880s
- Born: 14 January 1861; Kuorevesi, Finland
- Died: 20 January 1937 (aged 76); Helsinki, Finland
- Resting place: Hietaniemi Cemetery
- Education: Jyväskylä Teacher Seminary
- Occupation: Poet
- Writing career
- Notable work: Joulukirkkoon

Ingeborg "Immi" Hellén (14 January 1861 – 20 January 1937) was a Finnish poet. Hellén's most famous works are poems for children and nursery rhymes.

Her poems were later collected in two books: Lapsuuden lauluja (1991) and Punaposki, kultasuu (2000).

== Life ==
Immi Hellén was born in Kuorevesi and studied at a Swedish girls' school in Tampere and in 1884 graduated as an elementary school teacher at the seminary in Jyväskylä. She then worked as a teacher in Vaasa and from 1885 to 1927 in Helsinki. She was involved in the temperance movement and the animal welfare community. Hellén wrote more than a thousand poems, most of which were published in children's magazines. She died in Helsinki.

In Kuorevesi, poetry competitions were held in her honour in 1998, 2001 and 2004.

== Poems ==
Some of Hellén's most famous poems include:

- Kotiin
- Paimenpoika
- Oravan pesä
- Joulukirkkoon
- Enkeli ohjaa (the lyrics of the song "Suojelusenkeli" are based on the poem)

== Works ==
- Aune: nuorisolle. Otava, 1896.
- Lasten runoja 1: Kodin ja koulun varalle. Werner Söderström, 1898.
- Lasten lauluja. Collected by Immi Hellén. WSOY, 1899.
- Eeva Aarnio: kertomus nuorille. Werner Söderström, 1901.
- Joulukirja nuorisolle nousevalle. Zachris Schalin, transl. Immi Hellén. Werner Söderström, 1901.
- Kotitanhuvilla. Written by pseudonym Tohtori-Eno, transl. Immi Hellén. Otava, 1915.
- Mustan Kotkan kapteeni. C. M. Bennett, transl. Immi Hellén. Valistus, 1929.
- Lasten runokirja: Suomen pojille ja tytöille omistettu. Valistus, 1930.
- Alakansakoulun lukemisto. Together with Tyyni Kontuniemi and J. K. Santala. Valistus, 1930.
- Jouluilta satumaassa: viisi pientä satunäytelmää. Astrid Wång-Mariani, ill. Margit Broberg, transl. Immi Hellén. Kuvataide, 1930.
- Runoja. Ed. Ilona Merikoski, ill. Alf Danning ja Heikki Paaer. Valistus, 1951.
- Ihmeitten ihme: Rudolf Koivun kuvittamia satuja. Ill. Rudolf Koivu, fairy tales by Immi Hellén and others, ed. Marja Peltonen. Valistus, 1977.
- Haltiattarien linna. Ill. Venny Soldan-Brofeldtin, Alexander Paischeffin and Onni Muusarin. Fairy tales by Immi Hellén and others, ed. Marja Peltonen. Valistus, 1978.
- Punaposki, kultasuu: runoaarteita. Karisto, 2000.
- Lasten riemut: luonnonkirjaa lukemassa. Immi Hellén, ed. Anna-Liisa Alanko. WSOY, 2008
- Hyvää huomenta, punahilkka!. Ed. Tuula Korolainen, ill. Karoliina Pertamo. Tammi, 2011.
- Äidin perintö : kokoelma Immi Hellénin kirjeitä ja runoja perintöjen aarrearkusta. Ed. Riitta Erwe. Immi Hellén seura, 2011.

== Literature ==
- Alanko, Anna-Liisa (1997). Kotiveräjältä maailman turuille: Kansalliset kasvatusaatteet Immi Hellénin runoissa (PhD thesis). Joensuun yliopiston kasvatustieteellisiä julkaisuja. Vol. 35. Joensuu: Joensuun yliopisto. ISBN 951-70849-3-5. ISSN 0781-0334.
- Jyväskylän seminaari 1863–1937 (register). Valistus 1937.
