= Martti Peltonen =

Finnish mechanic and politician

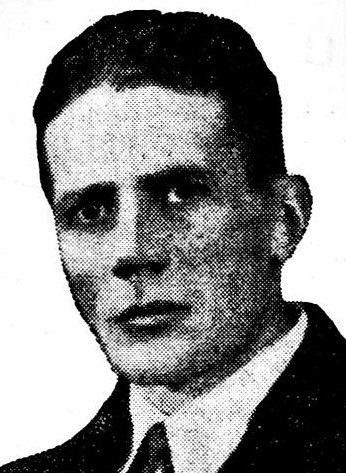
Member of the Parliament of Finland Martti Peltonen (1901-1903).

Martti Herman Peltonen (31 August 1901, Orivesi - 3 October 1973) was a Finnish mechanic and politician. He was imprisoned in 1918 for having sided with the Reds during the Finnish Civil War. He was a member of the Parliament of Finland from 1939 to 1945, representing the Social Democratic Party of Finland (SDP).
