= Jämsänkoski =

- Former municipality
- Jämsänkosken kunta Jämsänkoski kommun
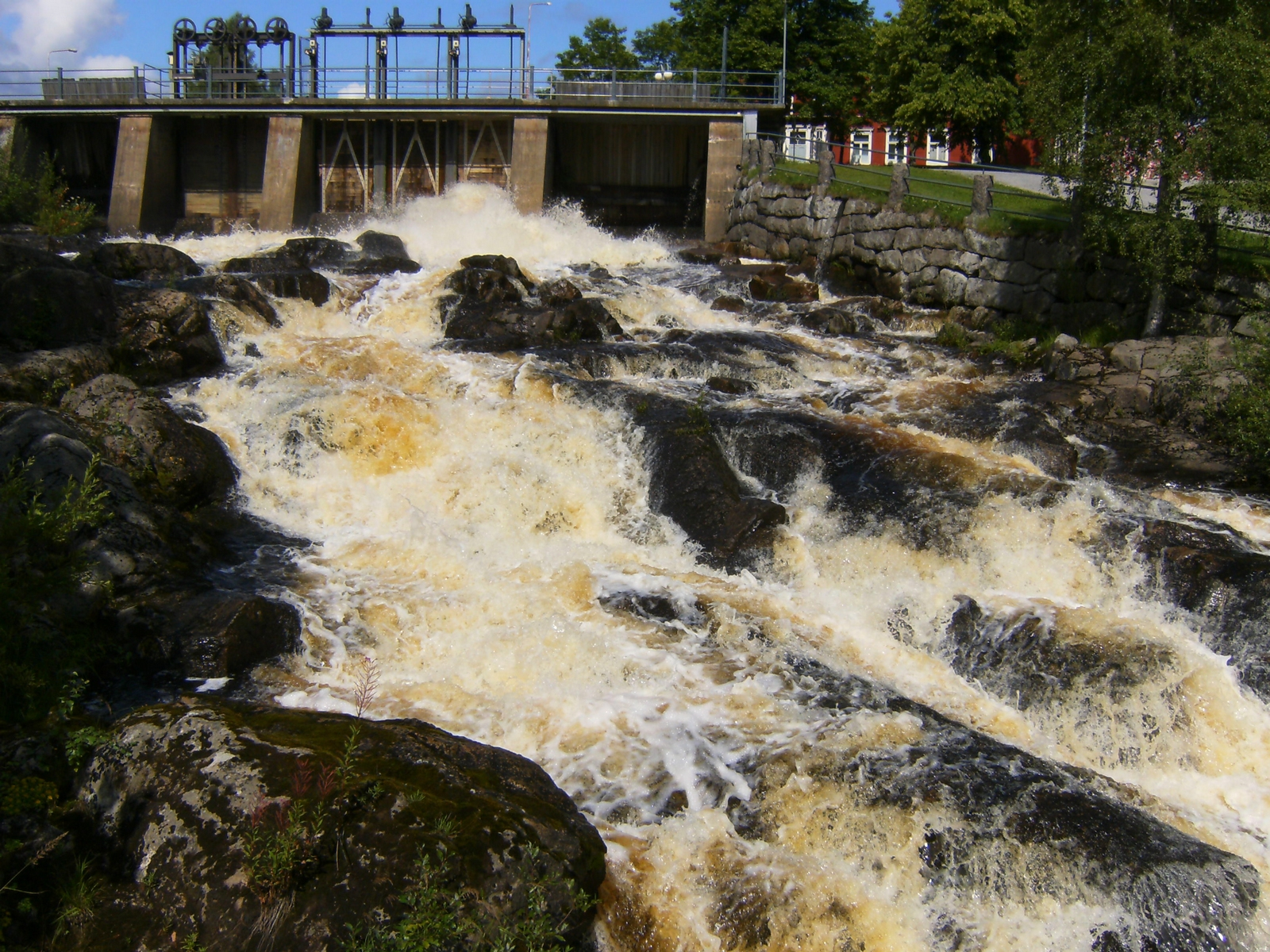

- Coat of arms

- Location of Jämsänkoski in Finland
- Coordinates: 61°55′05″N 25°10′15″E
- Country: Finland
- Region: Central Finland
- Established: 1926
- Merged into Jämsä: 2009
- Seat: Jämsänkosken keskustaajama

Area
  - Land: 401.75 km^{2} (155.12 sq mi)

Population (2008)
  - Total: 7,351

Jämsänkoski is a former town and municipality of Finland in the Central Finland region. It is located near Lake Päijänne and the Jämsänjoki river. The town had a population of 7,351 in 2008. It covered an area of 448.67 km² of which 48.02 km² is water. The population density was 16.9 inhabitants per km².

The municipality of Koskenpää was consolidated with Jämsänkoski in 1969, while Jämsänkoski was consolidated with Jämsä in 2009.

== History ==
Linnasenmäki, the remains of an Iron Age hillfort, are located in the southern part of Jämsänkoski near the paper mill. The area may have had Stone Age settlement as well.

Jämsänkoski was originally only the name of the rapids in the Jämsänjoki river. The area was originally a part of the Jämsä parish.

A sawmill has existed by the rapids since the 1790s. Paper production started in 1888, when Elieser Johansson and Per Benjamin Köhlin established a cellulose factory in the area. The settlement of Jämsänkoski grew around the factories. Jämsänkoski got its own parish in 1925 and became a separate municipality in 1926. The Jämsänkoski church was built in 1935.

The municipality of Koskenpää was consolidated with Jämsänkoski in 1969. Jämsänkoski became a town in 1986. In 2009, Jämsänkoski became a part of Jämsä once again.

== Economy ==
The paper mill owned by UPM Kymmene is the largest employer of Jämsänkoski.

== Twinnings ==
- Luunja Parish, Estonia

== Notable people ==
- William Mäkinen (born 1995) - ice hockey player
