= Hedman =

Hedman is a Swedish surname. It is an ornamental name composed of the elements hed "heath", "moor" + man "man".

In 2014, the surname was most frequently found in Sweden, followed by the United States and Finland.

Notable people with the surname include:

- Al Hedman (born 1953), former Jamaican-born English professional darts player
- Anton Hedman (born 1986), Swedish ice hockey player
- Deta Hedman (born 1959), English darts player
- Drew Hedman (born 1986), American baseball coach
- Ernst G. Hedman (1867–1933), Finnish architect who co-founded Grahn, Hedman & Wasastjerna
- Graham Hedman (born 1979), British short-distance runner
- Gustaf Erik Hedman (1777–1841), Finnish master painter
- Heikki Hedman (1940–2022), Finnish tennis player
- Henrik Hedman (born 1968), Swedish businessman and racing driver
- Magnus Hedman (born 1973), Swedish footballer
- Marina Hedman (born 1944), retired Swedish pornographic actress
- Martha Hedman (1883–1974), Swedish-American actress
- Mika Hedman (born 1965), Finnish former professional tennis player
- Oscar Hedman (born 1986), Swedish ice hockey player
- Reidar Hedman (1896–1961), Finnish educator, eugenist, and politician
- Rudi Hedman (born 1964), English retired professional footballer
- Sigrid Hedman (1855–1922), Swedish spiritist
- Ture Hedman (1895–1950), Swedish gymnast
- Victor Hedman (born 1990), Swedish hockey player

== See also ==
- Hedmanska gården – cultural monument in Malmö
- Rosenvingeska huset – cultural monument in Malmö
- Beijerska huset – cultural monument in Malmö
