= Josua Järvinen =

Finnish politician

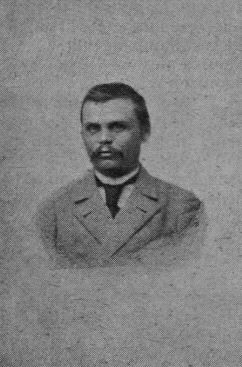

Josua Järvinen (4 February 1871 in Orivesi – 28 February 1948) was a Finnish schoolteacher, inspector of schools and politician. He was a member of the Parliament of Finland from 1907 to 1911, representing the Social Democratic Party of Finland (SDP).
