= Eetu Jussila =

Finnish politician

Sulo Eetu Jussila (7 September 1882, in Orivesi – 15 June 1973) was a Finnish farmer and politician. He was a member of the Parliament of Finland from 1929 to 1930 and again from 1931 to 1933, representing the Agrarian League. He was the younger brother of Kustaa Jussila.
