= Mimmi Haapasalo =

Finnish politician

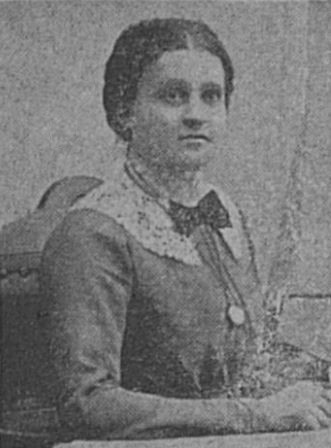
Image of Mimmi Haapasalo

Vilhelmiina (Mimmi) Haapasalo (née Jokinen; 16 November 1881 in Kuorevesi – 16 May 1970) was a Finnish salesperson and politician. She was a member of the Parliament of Finland from 1913 to 1916, representing the Social Democratic Party of Finland (SDP).
