= Misse =

Small forest bogs found in the Black Forest.

Missen (singular: misse) are small, shallow, forest bogs in pine (Pinus sylvestris)-dominated woods that form on crests, saddles, hollows or plateaus in the hills or mountains. They only have a thin layer of peat of between 30 and 100 centimetres thick. The term misse is local to the Northern Black Forest and also surfaces as Miß, Müsse or Müß. These names probably derive from the German Moos ("moss") because peat mosses (Sphagnum) play a key role in their development. Due to the poor tree growth associated with them, however, it could also stand for mies ("bad").

Missen are most common on plateaus where the precipitation is heavy and the drainage is poor. But event silted-up tarns and shallow tarn soils may have missen on their hillsides (Hillside or swamp bogs). Floristically and depending on location, missen may transition into raised bogs, whereby ombrotrophes, i.e. areas exclusively fed by rainwater, (initially) are formed, albeit they only have a small surface area.

== Formation ==
Missen are formed on base-poor soils that have a tendency to become waterlogged. In addition, other climatic factors such as high levels of precipitation, a relatively short vegetation period and a cool, moist, montane climate are basic pre-requisites. Human exploitation may also favour the emergence of missen. The introduction of stall feeding in the 19th century forced forest farmers to use the ground vegetation as bedding. On poor bunter sandstone soils raw humus is laid down as a result of the constant removal of nutrients. The blueberry (Vaccinium myrtillus), an indicator of acidicism, becomes the dominant type of dwarf shrub. Moor grass (Molinia caerulea, M. arundinacea) colonises the shore areas in dense tussocks.

== Literature ==
- Landesanstalt für Umweltschutz Baden Württemberg: Beiheft No.73, "Verbreitung der Missen, Missen im Landkreis Calw", Karlsruhe, 1993, ISSN 0342-6858
- Volker Späth, Institut für Landschaftsökologie und Naturschutz, Bühl: Heft Nr.3 "Nationalparkvorschlag Nordschwarzwald", 1992, ISSN 0934-1277
