= Jämsänjoki =

Coordinates: 61°49′N 25°15′E

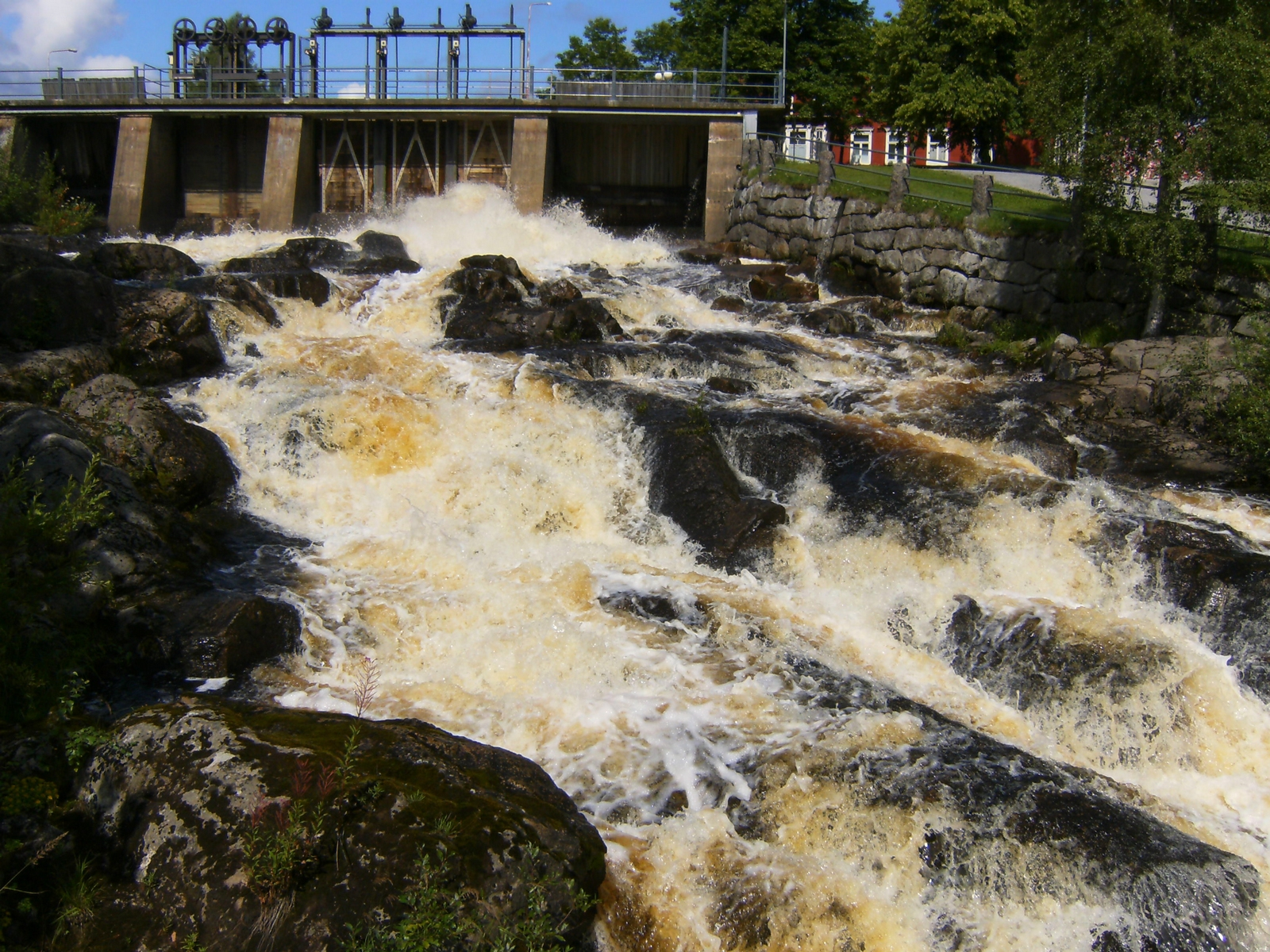

Location
- Country: Finland

Physical characteristics
- Length: 15 km (9.3 mi)

Jämsänjoki is a river in Finland in the town of Jämsä in Central Finland region. It is 15 kilometres (9 mi) long and has a watershed of about 1,448 square kilometres (559 mi^{2}). The river flows from Kankarisvesi into the Lake Päijänne, from which the waters flows into the Gulf of Finland through the Kymijoki river.

== See also ==
- List of rivers of Finland
