= Längelmäki =

- Former municipality
- Längelmäen kunta Längelmäki kommun
- Coat of arms

- Location of Längelmäki in Finland
- Coordinates: 61°43′45″N 024°48′00″E
- Country: Finland
- Province: Häme Province
- Region: Pirkanmaa
- Merged into Jämsä and Orivesi: 2007
- Seat: Länkipohja

Area
  - Land: 496.88 km^{2} (191.85 sq mi)
  - Water: 73.33 km^{2} (28.31 sq mi)

Population (2006-12-31)
  - Total: 1,644

Längelmäki is a former municipality of Finland. Längelmäki was divided in 2007 between Jämsä and Orivesi. Längelmäki is situated by the lake Längelmävesi, from which it has got also its name. The administrative center of Längelmäki was the village of Länkipohja.

Its western parts are now part of the Pirkanmaa region and the eastern part are part of the Central Finland region. The municipality had a population of 1,734 (2003) and covered an area of 496,88 km^{2} of which 73,33 km^{2} was water (2006). The population density was 3.5 inhabitants per km^{2}.

The municipality was unilingually Finnish.

== History ==
Längelmäki was first mentioned in 1506. At the time it was called Längelmä and it was a part of the Orivesi parish. In 1640, Längelmäki became a separate parish. The church was built in the village of Karvia, but Länkipohja, originally called Längelmäpohja, was a more significant village. The name Längelmä was still occasionally used for the parish until the 20th century.

Kuorevesi was a part of Längelmäki until 1873. In 2007, Längelmäki was divided between Orivesi and Jämsä.
