= Roope Jussila =

Finnish diplomat

Roope Jussila (19 April 1943 – 11 December 2013) was a Finnish diplomat.

Jussila was born in Varkaus. He was employed by the Ministry for Foreign Affairs for almost 40 years. His foreign places of residence were Marseille, San Francisco, Lagos, Ankara, Alger, Tunis and Prague. Jussila said during the Algerian civil war in 1994, half a year alone Chargé d'Affaires of the Embassy of Finland in Algiers on the functioning of the other embassy staff moved because of troubled conditions in Tunis. He was then acting Chargé d'Affaires in Tunis from 1995 to 1996.

Jussila published his memoirs in 2009 Diplomaattisia mustelmia eli miten selviytyä kissojen kanssa maailmalla. He had cats as pet animals, and as an expert in cat care, he was assisting, for example, when President Tarja Halonen's cats Miska and Rontti moved to Mäntyniemi. He died in Helsinki, aged 70.

Jussila appeared in Jaakko Pakkasvirta's 1968 film Vihreä leski.
