= Kuorevesi =

- Former municipality
- Kuoreveden kunta Kuorevesi kommun
- Coat of arms

- Location of Kuorevesi in Finland
- Coordinates: 61°51′N 24°47′E
- Country: Finland
- Province: Häme Province/Western Finland Province
- Region: Pirkanmaa
- Established: 1873
- Merged into Jämsä: 2001
- Seat: Halli

Area
  - Land: 334.2 km^{2} (129.0 sq mi)

Population (2000-12-31)
  - Total: 2,750

Kuorevesi is a former municipality in Finland. It was part of the Pirkanmaa region in western Finland. In the year 2001 it was consolidated into the town of Jämsä in the Central Finland region. The name of the municipality came from the Lake Kuorevesi that is situated in its area.

== History ==
The name of Kuorevesi is derived from the lake's name, which literally means "smelt water".

Kuorevesi was first mentioned in 1449 as Kohrevesi, though this may have referred to the lake. The area was a part of the Kangasala parish until 1540 and Orivesi until 1640, after which it became a part of the Längelmäki parish separated from Orivesi in the same year. Kuorevesi acquired its first proper church in 1683. Kuorevesi became a separate municipality in 1873 and a parish in 1881. It remained independent until 2001, when it was merged into Jämsä.

== People born in Kuorevesi ==
- Immi Hellén (1861 – 1937)
- Nestori Toivonen (1865 – 1927)
- Mimmi Haapasalo (1881 – 1970)
- Martti Haukioja (1999 – )
- Liisa Rantalaiho (b. 1933), sociologist
- Tyyne Salomaa (1891 – 1938)
- Ulla Juurola (1942 – )
