= Eräjärvi =

- Former municipality
- Eräjärven kunta Eräjärvi kommun
- Coat of arms
- Interactive map of Eräjärvi
- Country: Finland
- Region: Pirkanmaa

Area
  - Metro: 153.7 km^{2} (59.3 sq mi)

Population
  - Density: 0/km^{2} (0/sq mi)
  - Metro: ca. 900
- Time zone: UTC+02:00 (EET)
  - Summer (DST): UTC+03:00 (EEST)
- Postal code: 35220
- Website: www.erajarvi.net

Eräjärvi is a former municipality of Finland. It is located 20 km from Orivesi, and 50 km from Tampere . It was an independent municipality until 1973. After 1973 part of Orivesi city (population ca. 9,000). It has a church that was built in 1821, as part of Orivesi parish.

== Villages ==
- Uiherla
- Vihasjärvi
- Haapaniemi
- Hietalahti
- Järvenpää
- Kauppila
- Vedentausta
- Hirtolahti
- Kuivanen
- Koppala
- Leväslahti

== Organisations and non-governmental organisations active in Eräjärvi ==
- The Development Organisation of Eräjärvi village (Eräjärven Kehittämisyhdistys ry), registered in 1991
- Eräjärvi Sports Club (Eräjärven Urheilijat ry): Sport activities, Erälinna building and Rönni entertainment centre
- Eräjärven Työväen Näyttämö. Rönni Summer theatre and Eräjärvi tupa theatre
- Water organisation of Eräjärvi region – building and connecting households to waterline
- Eräjärvi association: Collecting historical memorandum from Eräjärvi, Stone and mineral museum
- Leväslahti small farmers association – Collecting historical memorandum, village hall
- Järvenpää-Vihasjärvi village association – market, trips, village activities
- Eräjärvi schools parents association – Taking care of school children's interest
- Circus Supiainen – local circus group for children
- Finnish Red Cross –Eräjärvi jaosto – First aid groups for children, fund raising
