= Kustaa Jussila =

Finnish politician

Kustaa Aadolf Jussila (8 October 1879, in Orivesi – 9 February 1964) was a Finnish politician. He was a member of the Parliament of Finland from 1936 to 1939, representing the Patriotic People's Movement (IKL). He was the elder brother of Eetu Jussila.
