= Orivesi =

- Town of Orivesi
- Oriveden kaupunki Orivesi stad
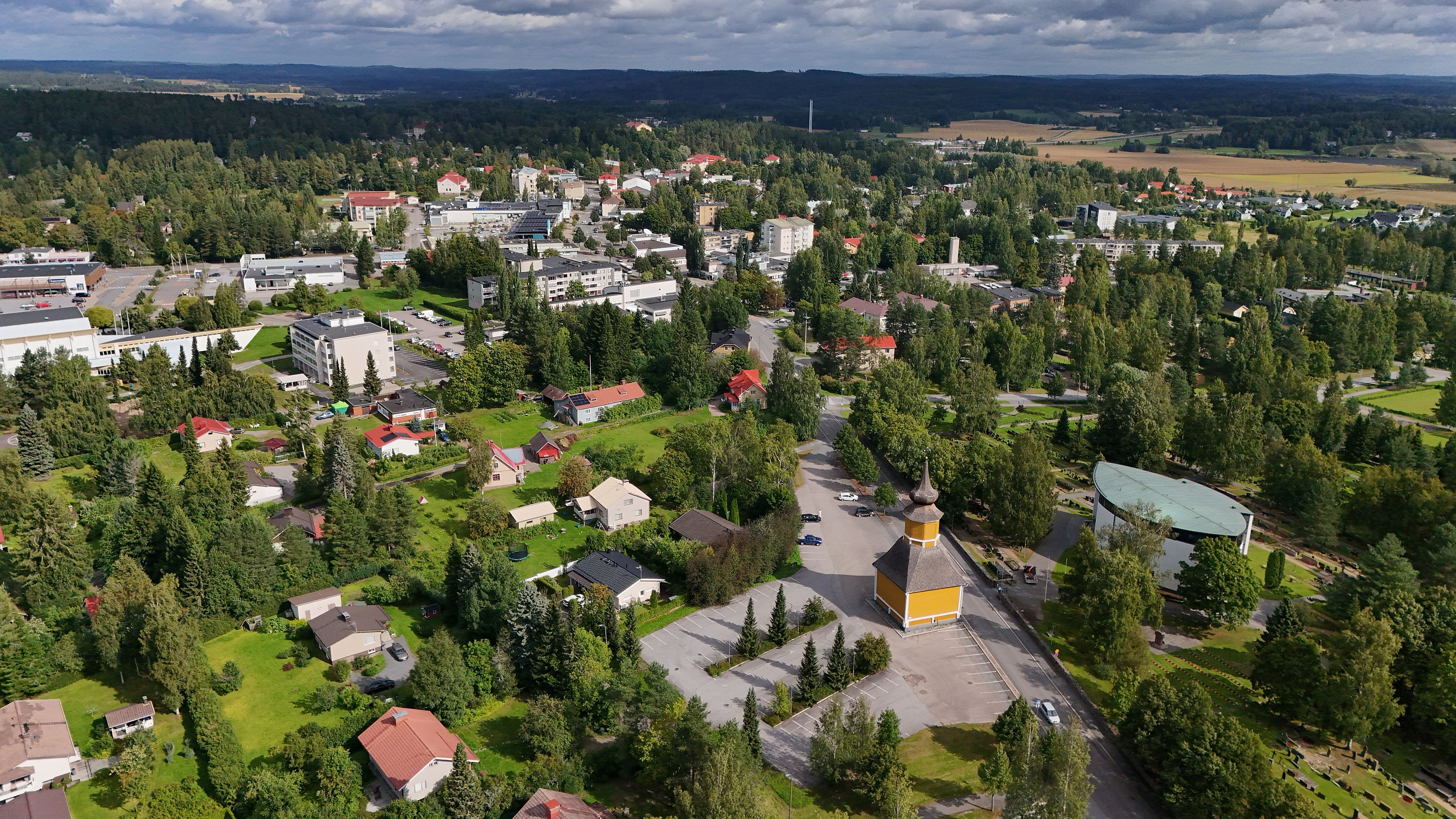
- Orivesi center

- Coat of arms
- Etymology: "ori" = stallion + "vesi" = water, lake
- Location of Orivesi in Finland
- Interactive map of Orivesi
- Coordinates: 61°40.5′N 024°21.5′E
- Country: Finland
- Region: Pirkanmaa
- Sub-region: Tampere
- Metropolitan area: Tampere
- Charter: 1869
- Town: 1986

Government
  - Town manager: Juha Kuusisto

Area (2018-01-01)
  - Total: 960.09 km^{2} (370.69 sq mi)
  - Land: 799.72 km^{2} (308.77 sq mi)
  - Water: 160.53 km^{2} (61.98 sq mi)
  - Rank: 100th largest in Finland

Population (2025-12-31)
  - Total: 8,858
  - Rank: 112th largest in Finland
  - Density: 11.08/km^{2} (28.7/sq mi)

Population by native language
  - Finnish: 97% (official)
  - Swedish: 0.1%
  - Others: 2.9%

Population by age
  - 0 to 14: 14.6%
  - 15 to 64: 55.3%
  - 65 or older: 30.1%
- Time zone: UTC+02:00 (EET)
  - Summer (DST): UTC+03:00 (EEST)
- Website: orivesi.fi

Orivesi (Finnish pronunciation: [ˈoriˌʋesi]) is a town in Finland, located in the Pirkanmaa region. It lies to the northeast of the regional capital, Tampere. The population of Orivesi is approximately 9,000, while the metropolitan area has a population of approximately 428,000. It is the 112th most populous municipality in Finland.

Orivesi has an area of 960.09 square kilometres (370.69 sq mi) of which 160.53 km^{2} (61.98 sq mi) is water. The population density is 11.08 inhabitants per square kilometre (28.7/sq mi). The municipality official language is monolingually Finnish.

Orivesi was founded in 1869. It was municipality until 1986 when it became a city of Finland. The municipality of Eräjärvi was consolidated with Orivesi in 1973. A part of the municipality of Längelmäki was consolidated with Orivesi in 2007. Today, neighbouring municipalities are Juupajoki, Jämsä, Kangasala, Kuhmoinen, Ruovesi and Tampere. The distance from Orivesi to Tampere is 43 kilometres (27 mi). The town center of Orivesi is located by the Lake Längelmävesi.

Orivesi was the location of the Oriveden Opisto art school which moved to Tampere in 2018.

== Geography ==
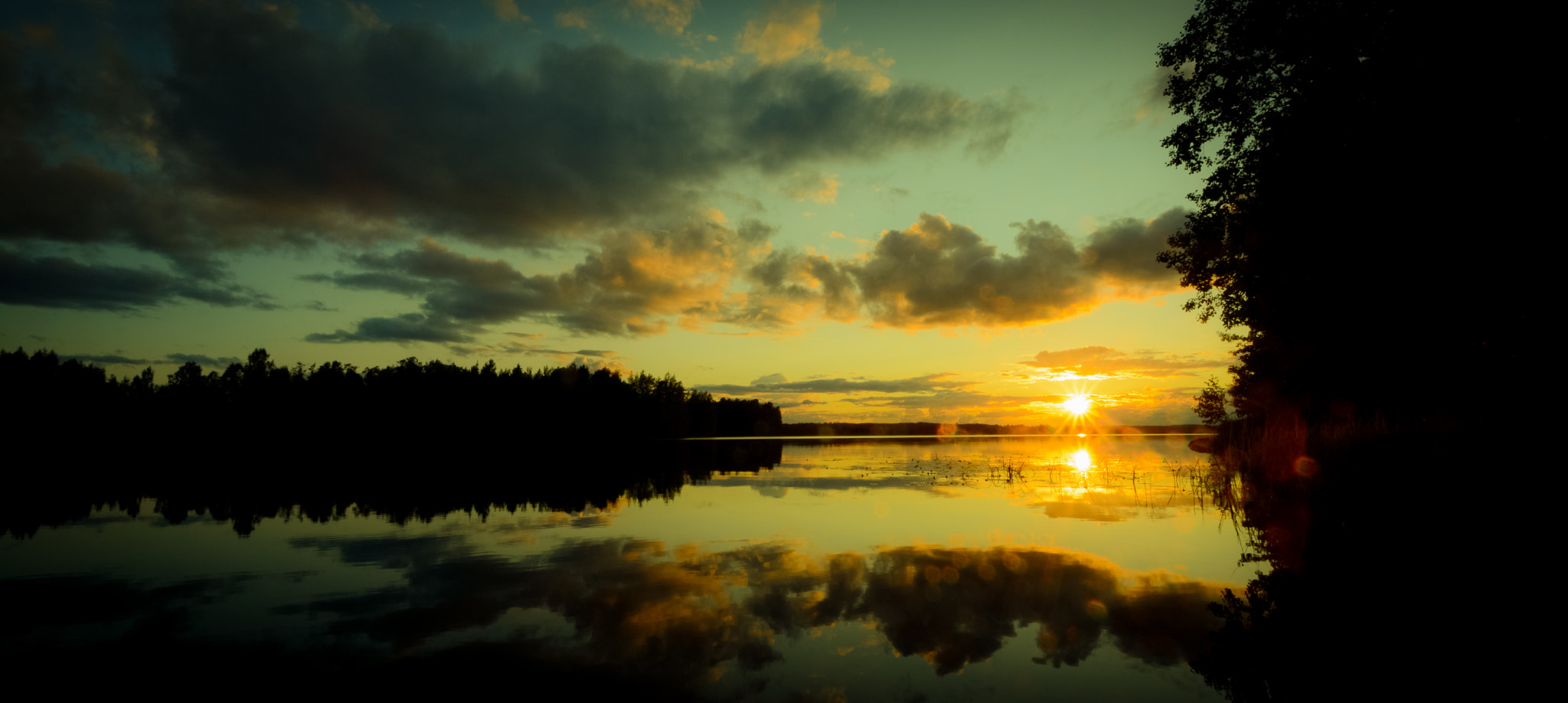
Sunset over the lake Eräjärvi at Orivesi

Orivesi has more than 350 lakes. The landscape of Orivesi is mostly dominated by Lake Längelmävesi, into which most of the area's water basis fall. The northeastern end of Kangasala's Lake Vesijärvi also extends to the Orivesi area. Some of the lakes in the western part of Orivesi flow into Lake Näsijärvi. The largest ridges in the town, which extend more than 200 meters above sea level, are located in the northwest near the borders of Tampere and Ruovesi. The average altitude of the terrain is 100–150 meters.

There is a gold mine opened in 1990 in Orivesi, from which more than 15 tons of gold have been mined.

== Culture ==
=== Food ===
In the 1980s, blood sausage and mustikkapöperö were named Orivesi's traditional parish dishes.

=== Sports ===
Orivesi is home to the Oriveden Fortuna, an ice hockey club founded in 1968, which trains in the Orivesi Ice Rink. Orivesi also has a football club, Oriveden Tuisku.

== People ==
- Juho Lehmus (1858 – 1918)
- Josua Järvinen (1871 – 1948)
- Kustaa Jussila (1879 – 1964)
- Eetu Jussila (1882 – 1973)
- Martti Peltonen (1901 – 1973)
- Antero Kivi (1904 – 1981)
- Aimo Jokinen (1931 – )
- Tarmo Koivisto (1948 – )
- Juha Kivi (1964 – )
- Tapio Saramäki (1953 – )

== See also ==
- Finnish national road 58
- Lake Orivesi
- Orimattila
