= Renko, Finland =

Former municipality in Finland

Coordinates: 60°53′35″N 24°17′00″E

Location of Renko in Finland

Renko is a former municipality of Finland. It was consolidated with Hämeenlinna on 2009-01-01.

It was located in the province of Southern Finland and is part of the Kanta-Häme region. The municipality had a population of 2,378 (30 November 2008) and covered an area of 290.85 square kilometres (112.30 sq mi) of which 12.32 km^{2} (4.76 sq mi) is water. The population density is 8.54 inhabitants per square kilometre (22.1/sq mi).

The municipality is unilingually Finnish. The municipality has previously also been known as "Rengo" in Swedish documents, but is today referred to as "Renko" also in Swedish.
