= Jämsä =

- Town
- Jämsän kaupunki Jämsä stad
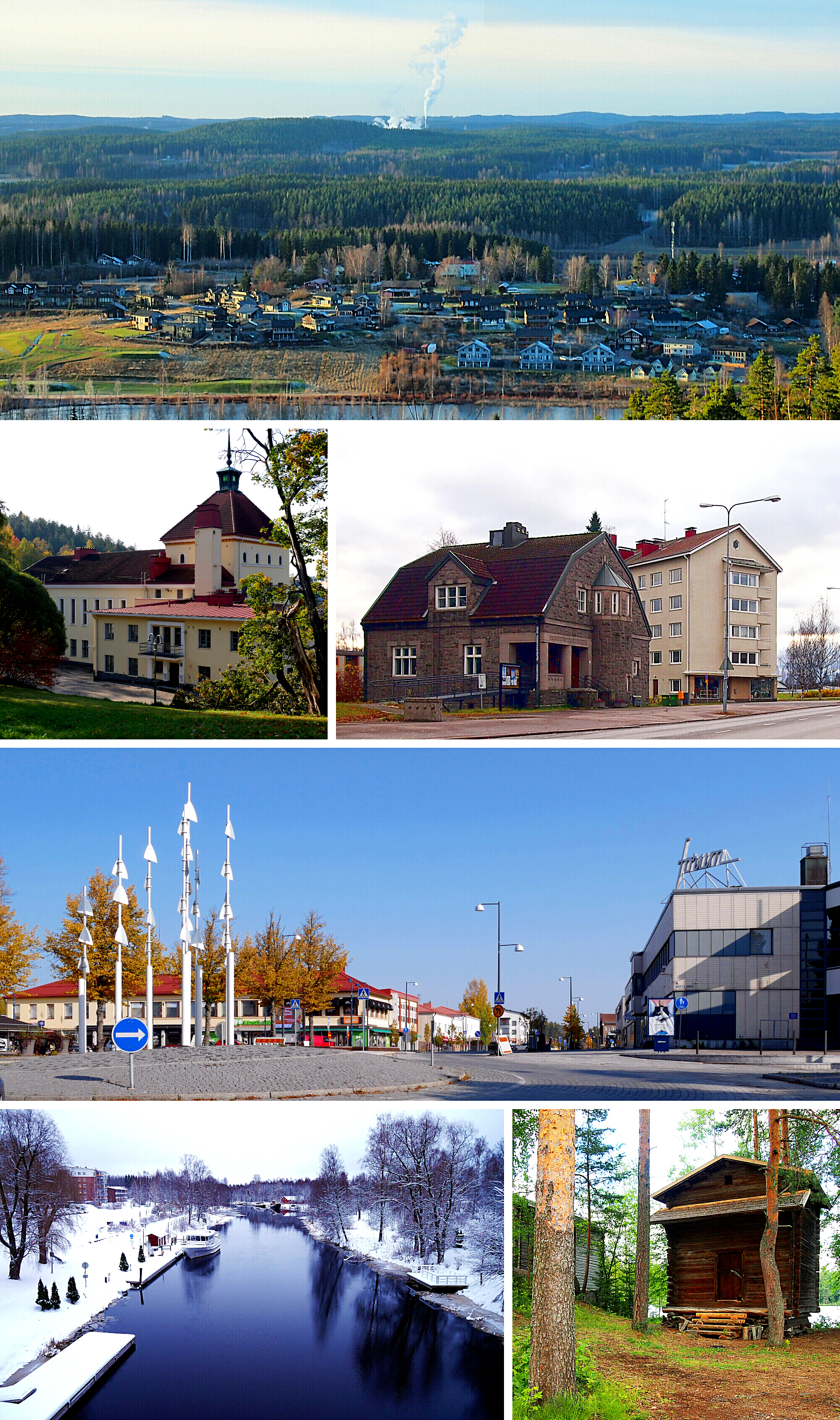
- Montage of Jämsä

- Coat of arms

- Location of Jämsä in Finland
- Interactive map of Jämsä
- Coordinates: 61°52′N 025°11′E
- Country: Finland
- Region: Central Finland
- Sub-region: Jämsä
- Charter: 1866

Government
  - Town manager: Hanna Helaste

Area (2018-01-01)
  - Total: 1,823.90 km^{2} (704.21 sq mi)
  - Land: 1,571.41 km^{2} (606.72 sq mi)
  - Water: 252.57 km^{2} (97.52 sq mi)
  - Rank: 39th largest in Finland

Population (2025-12-31)
  - Total: 19,020
  - Rank: 62nd largest in Finland
  - Density: 12.1/km^{2} (31/sq mi)

Population by native language
  - Finnish: 94.9% (official)
  - Swedish: 0.1%
  - Others: 4.9%

Population by age
  - 0 to 14: 12.6%
  - 15 to 64: 55.1%
  - 65 or older: 32.3%
- Time zone: UTC+02:00 (EET)
  - Summer (DST): UTC+03:00 (EEST)
- Website: jamsa.fi

Jämsä (Finnish pronunciation: [ˈjæmsæ]) is a town and municipality of Finland. It is located in the Central Finland region, about 58 kilometres (36 mi) southwest of Jyväskylä. The municipality has a population of 19,020 (31 December 2025), which makes it the second most populous town of the Central Finland after Jyväskylä. It covers an area of 1,823.90 square kilometres (704.21 sq mi) of which 252.57 km^{2} (97.52 sq mi) is water. The population density is 12.1 inhabitants per square kilometre (31/sq mi).

The municipality is officially Finnish-speaking.

The municipality of Kuorevesi was consolidated with Jämsä in 2001. The municipality of Längelmäki was partly consolidated with Jämsä in 2007. The municipality of Jämsänkoski was consolidated with Jämsä in the beginning of 2009.

== Geography ==
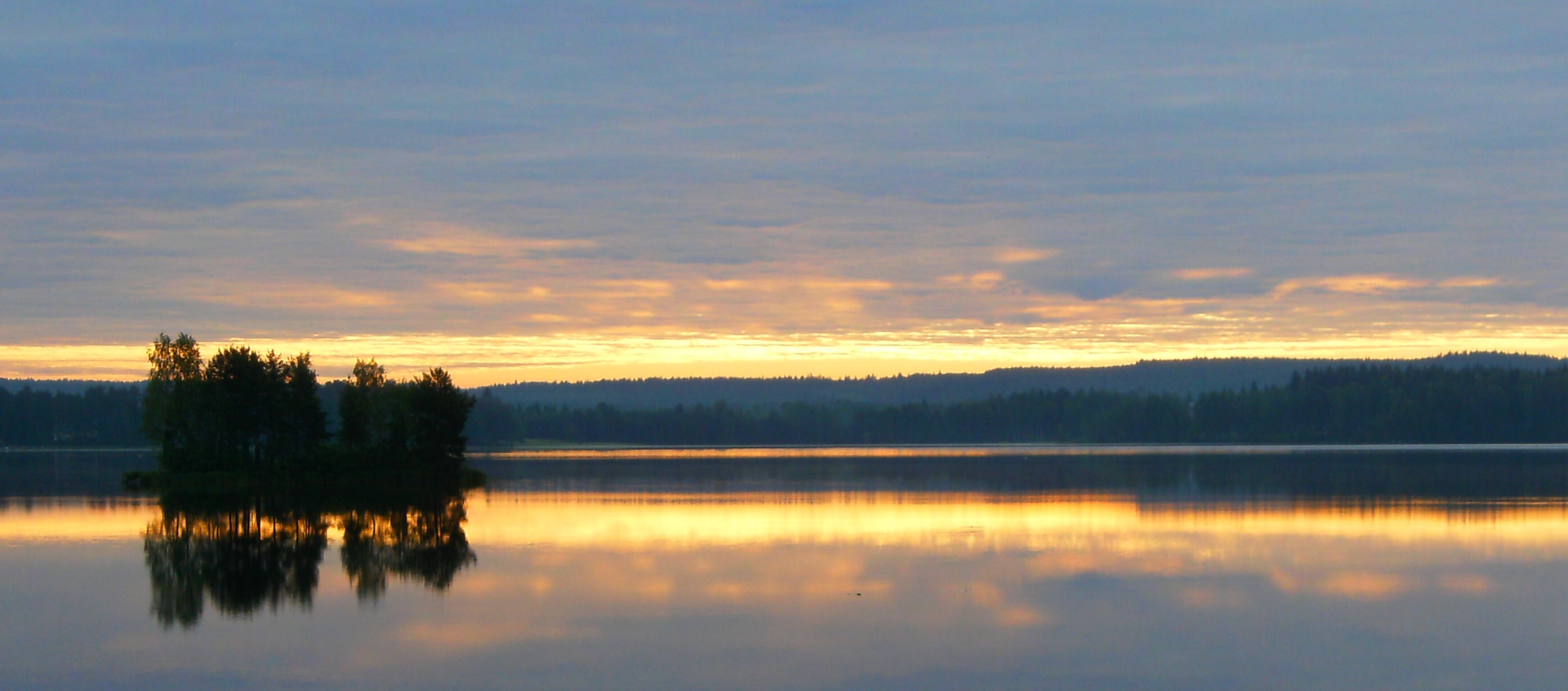
Lake Kankarisvesi in Jämsä

There are all together around 465 lakes in Jämsä; the largest lakes are Päijänne, Koljonselkä and Lake Kuorevesi. Jämsä is located on the watershed of the main catchment areas of the Kokemäki River and the Kymi River. The eastern and central areas of the municipality belong to the Kymi River watershed, the western ones to the Kokemäki River watershed. The catchment area of the Jämsä route of the first division phase of the Kymijoki main catchment area covers almost the entire area of Koskenpää and Jämsänkoski as well as the center of Jämsä and the central part of Jämsänniemi. The Great Päijänne area of the first division of the Kymi River watershed covers the eastern, south-eastern and southern areas of Jämsä. The catchment area of the Längelmävesi and Hauho routes of the first division of the Kokemäki River main catchment area covers the southwestern part of Jämsä, i.e. the southern part of Längelmäki and Kuorevesi. The catchment area of the Keuruu route in the first division phase of the Kokemäki River watershed covers the western and north-western part of Jämsä, i.e. the northern part of Kuorevesi and the westernmost parts of Koskenpää.

The bedrock of Jämsä belongs to the abyssal rock area of the Central Finland. The predominant species are coarse-grained granodiorites and granites, which are often porphyry and weathered in places. Rapakivi granite rock has also been found in the vicinity of Jämsä. The geological formation of the Inner Finland, which is similar to the Salpausselkä formations but younger than them, runs from Hämeenkangas in the north-west of Tampere through Orivesi and Jämsä to Laukaa. The meltwater of the Weichselian glaciation associated with its formation and melting has shaped several Jämsä valleys. The meltwater of the glacier flowed through the numerous transition valleys of the present-day Jämsä area.

== Economy ==
Jämsä is the center of Finnish aeronautics industry: the aircraft factory and aeronautical engineering offices of Patria is located at Halli Airport in Jämsä.

Jämsä hosts the former Kaipola paper mill, active from 1952 to 2021, where UPM used to employ around 400 workers until its closure. The site was sold to a real estate company and rented for various uses as of 2026, when it was being considered for sale a redevelopment.

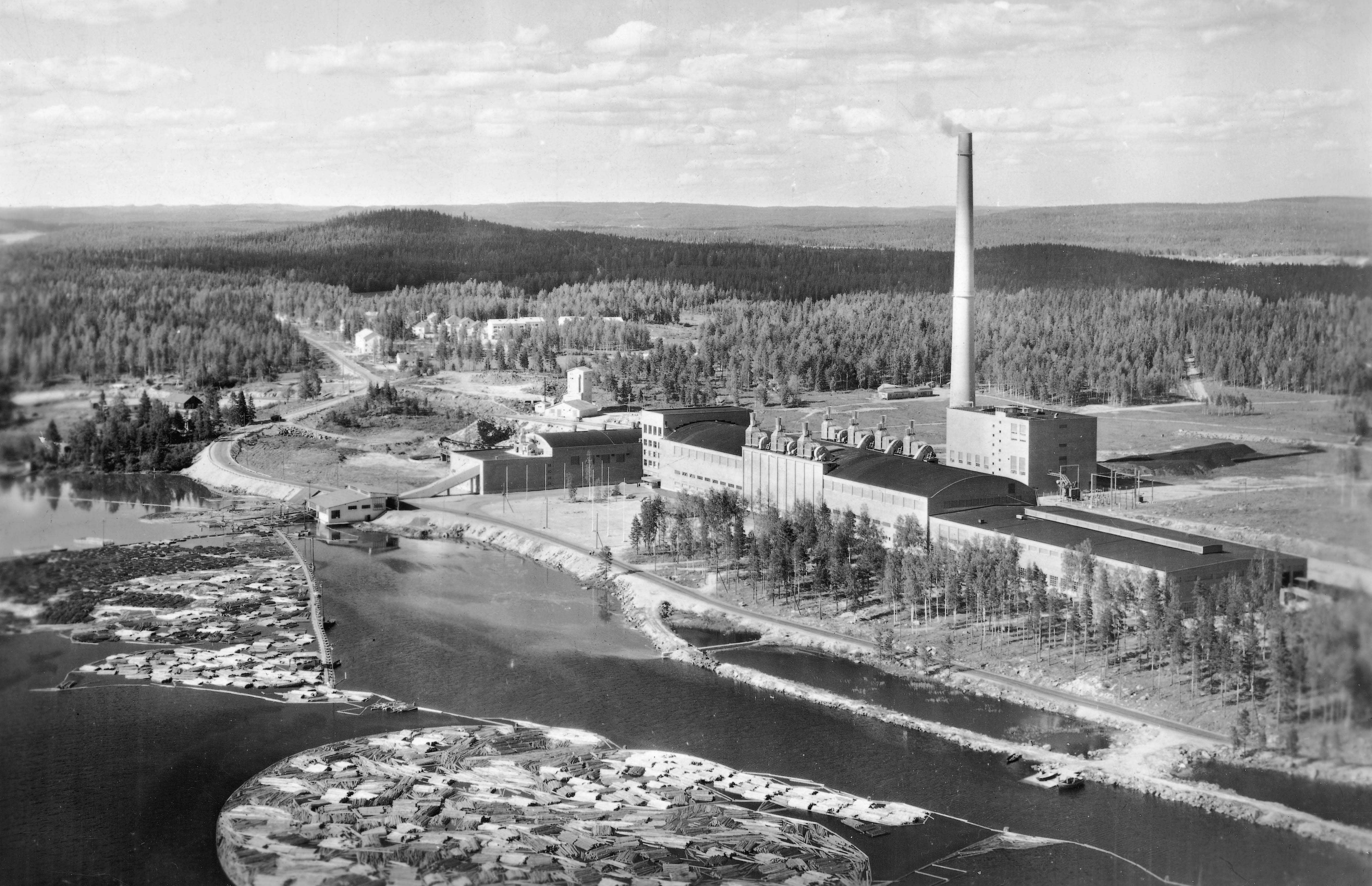
Kaipola paper mill in the 1950s

== Culture ==
=== Food ===
In the 1980s, Jämsä's traditional parish dishes were called liponen (meat cooked with turnip chips and barley groats), piimätalkkuna and grandma's buns.

=== Sports ===
Jämsänkosken Ilves is a sports club in Jämsä.

Himos Skiresort is located in Jämsä.

Pitkävuori ski jumping hill is located in Jämsä, near Kaipola, built in 1964, but unused since 1995. Car manufacturer Audi used the hill to shoot two commercials for its cars in 1986 and 2005, showcasing in Quattro all-wheel drive system.

== See also ==
- Längelmäki
- Länkipohja
- Battle of Länkipohja
- Jämsänkoski
- Jämsänkosken Ilves
- Jämsä sub-region
- Finnish national road 58
