= Goodman (shopping centre) =

Goodman Shopping Center
- Kauppakeskus Goodman
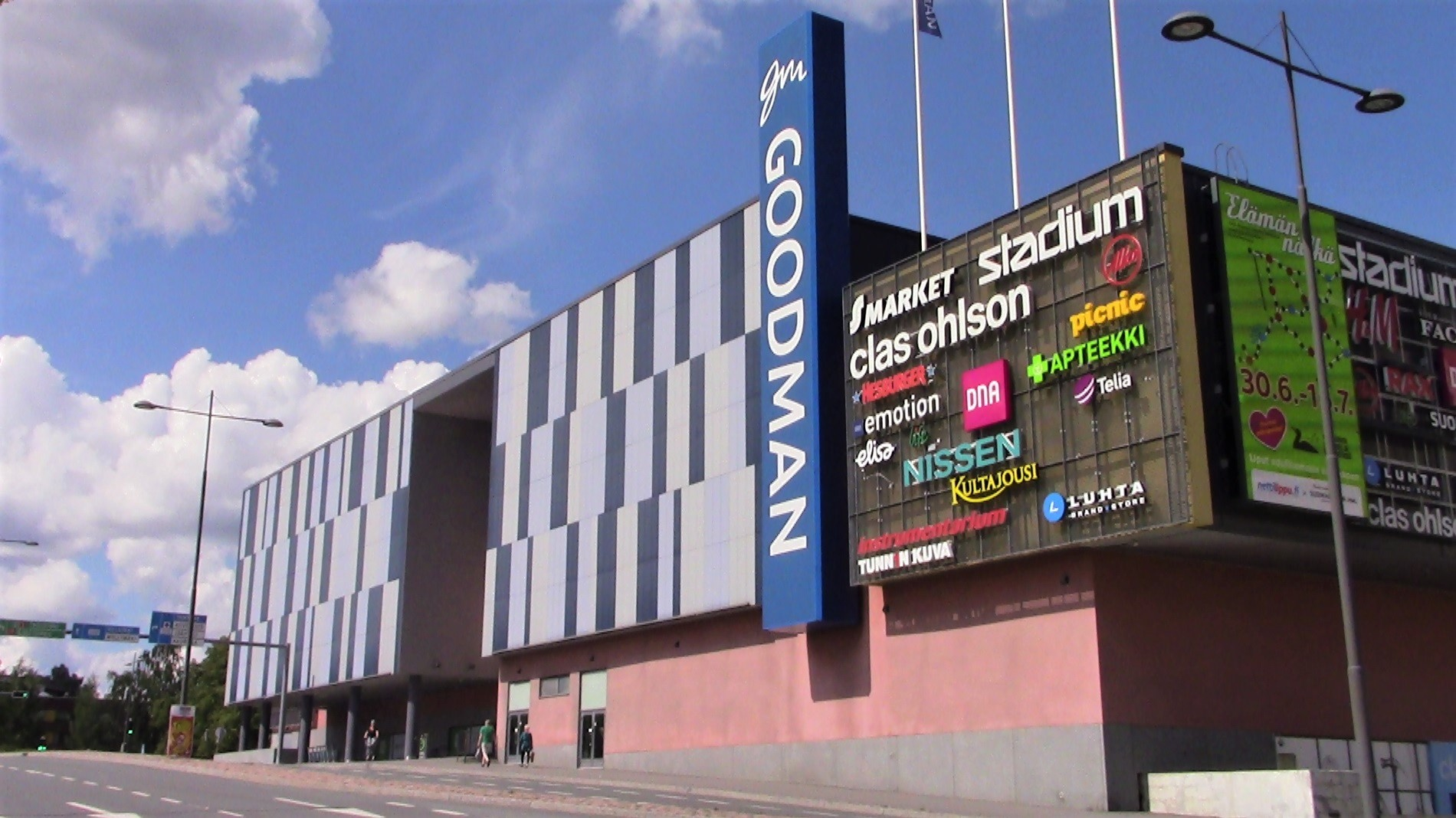
- Exterior of Goodman in 2023
- Location: Hämeensaari, Hämeenlinna, Finland
- Coordinates: 60°59′36″N 24°27′22″E
- Address: Kaivokatu 7
- Opened: October 30, 2014
- Owner: Keva
- Num. of stores: 68
- Floor area: 26,000 m²
- Floors: 4
- Parking: 629
- Website: kauppakeskusgoodman.fi/en/

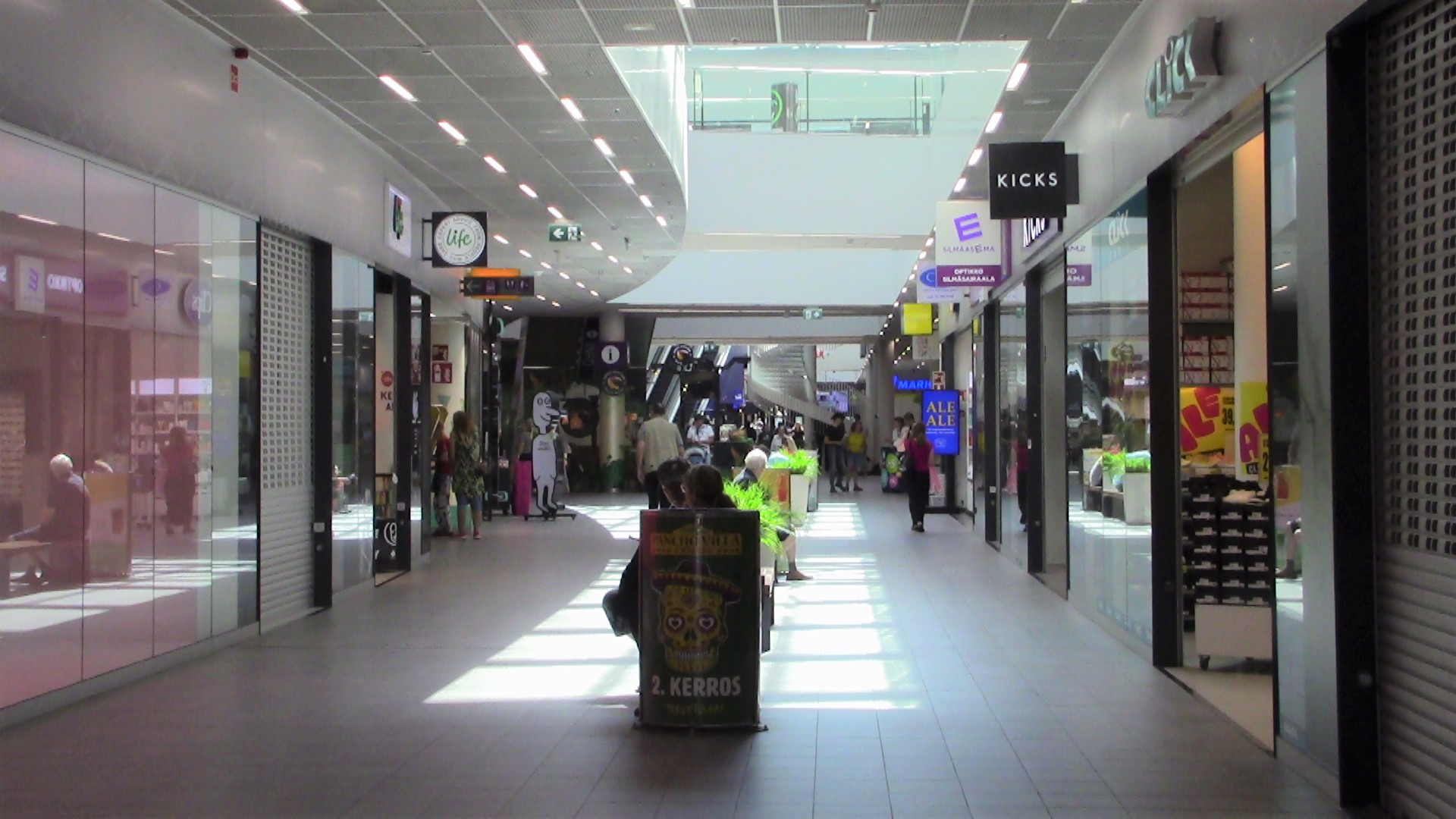
Goodman's corridor on the first floor.

Goodman is a shopping center located in the Hämeensaari district of the Hämeenlinna city center in Kanta-Häme, Finland, and it was opened on October 30, 2014. It is located on a deck built above Highway 3 (Helsinki–Tampere Highway), which runs through the city as a motorway. There are about 70 stores in the shopping center, many of which are new in Hämeenlinna. In the initial phase, the shopping center was implemented by the city of Hämeenlinna, the Finnish Transport Infrastructure Agency, the Häme Ely Center, HAMK Häme University of Applied Sciences and the construction company NCC.

In May 2012, Keva bought the shopping center from NCC and in November 2013 named it Goodman. The name of the shopping center comes from singer-composer Irwin Goodman (1943–1991), who was born and influenced in Hämeenlinna. According to Keva, Irwin Goodman is probably the most famous resident of Hämeenlinna, born in the 20th century, and the shopping center is "built just for life." In the marketing phase, the shopping center was known as Hämeenlinna Center (Hämeenlinnakeskus). However, on social media, the name of the mall has been criticized and considered poorly chosen.
