= Evo, Hämeenlinna =

Village in Hämeenlinna, Finland

Coordinates: 61°11.33′N 25°06.29′E

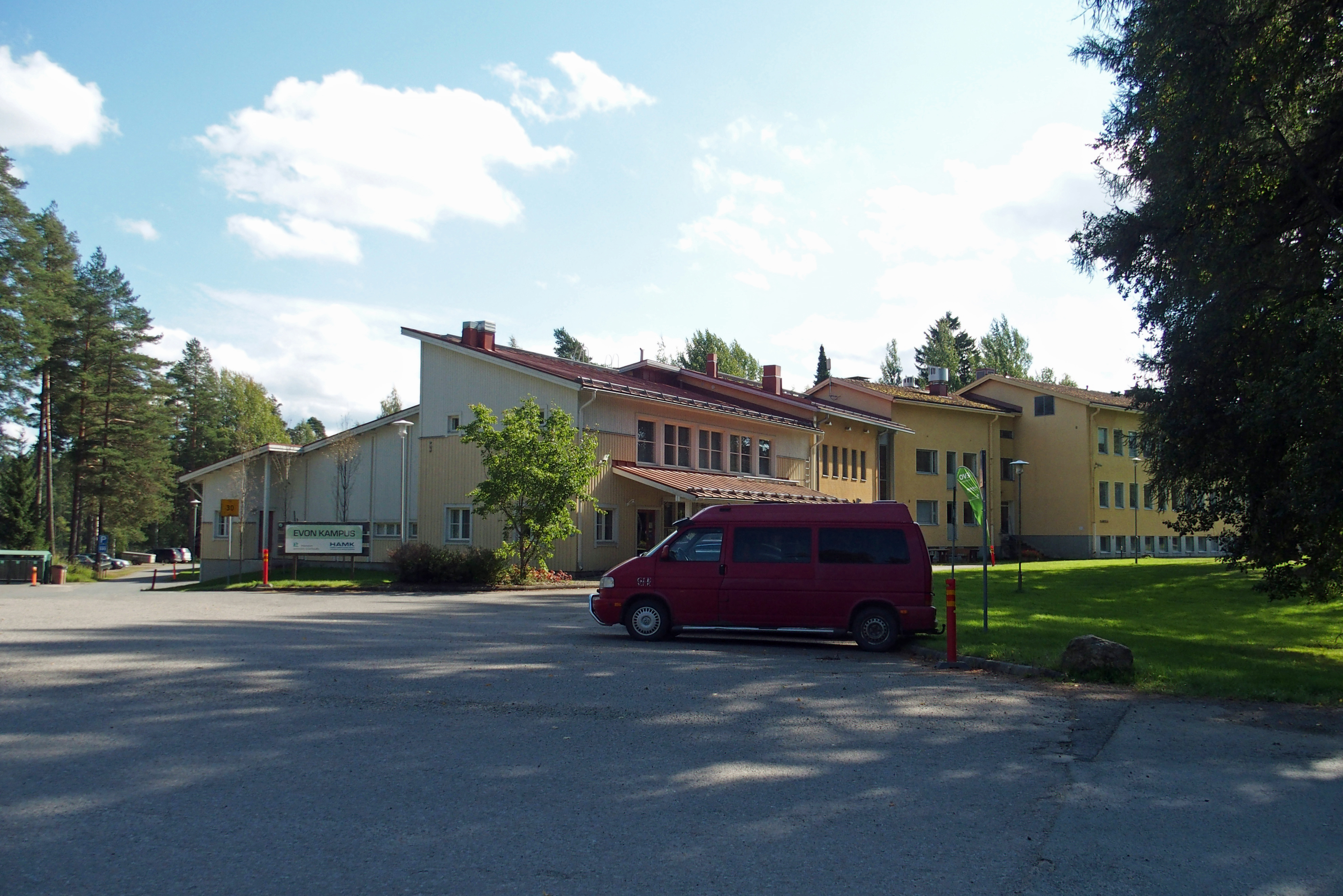
A forestry school of Evo

Evo is a village located along the main road 53 in the former municipality of Lammi, now part of the city of Hämeenlinna in the region of Kanta-Häme, Finland. It has a lot of tourism and recreational activities related to the nearby forest nature. The local camping area was established in 1994, and it extends to the area of Lammi and Padasjoki.

Among other things, the Niemisjärvi recreational fishing area and the forest education unit, HAMK Evo Forestry School, operating by Häme University of Applied Sciences and the Häme Vocational Institute, are located in the village.
