= Battle of Hämeenlinna =

1918 battle of the Finnish Civil War

- Part of the Finnish Civil War
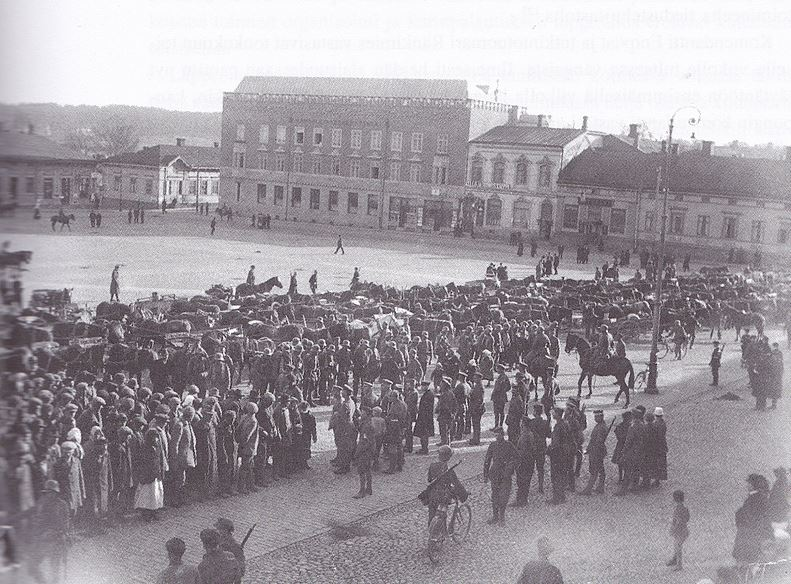
- Red Guardsmen gathered at the market following the White victory in the city.
Date	26 April 1918
Location	Hämeenlinna
Result	German and White victory

Belligerents
German Empire; Finnish Whites	Finnish Reds

Commanders and leaders
(German Empire) Konrad Wolf (German Empire) Lothar von Brandenstein (German Empire) Godert von Reden	Tuomas Hyrskymurro

Units involved
(German Empire) Baltic Sea Division	Hämeenlinna Red Guard

Strength
Unknown	30+

Casualties and losses
Unknown	20 died in the combat 20+ civilian casualties

The Battle of Hämeenlinna was a battle within the Finnish Civil War that took place in the city of Hämeenlinna, Finland on 26 April 1918.

== Before the Battle ==
The local White Guard was established in October 1917, and the local Hämeenlinna Red Guard in November 1917. When the declaration of Red Finland was made on the 26 January 1918, Hämeenlinna remained relatively peaceful and many working-class people attended a meeting following the declaration of the New Government in Helsinki with many people agreeing to be reserved and to wait for following events within the brewing Civil War, before declaring any allegiance to the new Red Government in Helsinki. This led to the Red Guard commander Eero Haapalainen urging people to rise up in the city on 29 January 1918, via a telephone call, however this did not have any effect. Later prompting on the same day for the Turku Red Guard accompanied with some Hämeenlinna Red Guardsmen to take over the city, and set up their defenses at a hotel by Linnankatu and the Town Hall building. Later also taking over the Bank of Finland there and the telephone exchange. Towards the beginning of April, the local Red Guardsmen began to practice terror within the city, leading to arrests and murders committed by the Reds. Some White Guardsmen were arrested in the Häme Castle.

== Battle of Hämeenlinna ==
Following the German Baltic Sea Division capture of Helsinki on 13 April, they continued up the Finnish Main Line towards Hämeenlinna, the 95th Reserve Infantry Brigade captured the villages of Janakkala and Leppäkoski on 25 April, and captured Turenki the next morning. Major Lothar von Brandenstein had reached Hämeenlinna first, however his advance was being blocked by the Red Guards. Major Godert von Reden had also begun his move towards Hämeenlinna via the railway line.

At approximately 1 o'clock on 26 April, the German Baltic Sea Division initiated the encirclement of the city, this caused panic amongst the local Red Guardsmen and civilians, prompting many of them to flee to the east in hopes of reaching Bolshevik Russia. The Baltic Sea Division destroyed the Hämeenlinna railway station via grenades. The Baltic Sea Division began to march towards the city centre from the directions of Harviala, the Red Guardsmen moved towards Idänpää to try and hold back the Baltic Sea Division back in order to protect the refugees moving northward.

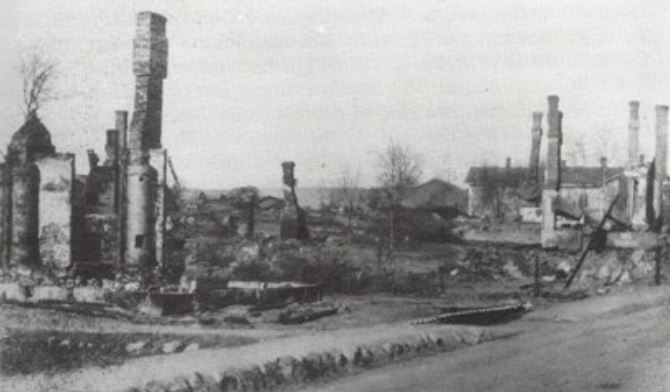
Idänpää following the bombardment

The Baltic Sea Division began to bombard Idänpää and other parts of the city with artillery-fire from Miemala in Vanaja, this left Idänpää in ruins. The Baltic Sea Division entered the city centre at 5'o'clock in the afternoon when the city center was almost entirely deserted, with only refugees left, the Baltic Sea Division was later followed by some Whites. The fleeing refugees consisting of women, children and some unarmed Red Guardsmen were shot at by the Germans and the damage was immense, around 20+ people died due to the firing at refugees. The Red Guard surrendered and raised white flags on-top of the roof of the Town Hall and provincial government house later that same day. The Whites arrested in the Häme Castle were released from captivity, they had all been unharmed by their Red captors. Following the capture of the city, Lothar von Brandenstein was made the commandant of Hämeenlinna.

=== Following the battle ===
Following the capture of the city, the White troops immediately began with home inspections and arrests of those suspected to have worked with the Red Guards. The White Guard also established the Hämeenlinna prison camp, which was famous for its brutality and harsh discipline. More than 10,000 people were in the Hämeenlinna camp and around 2,300 people died there. Major General Martin Wetzer of the White Guard, and General Harald Hjalmarson of the Swedish Brigade arrived to Hämeenlinna the day following the capture of the city.
