= Hämeenlinna Market Square =

Square in Hämeenlinna, Finland

Coordinates: 60°59′47.73692″N 24°27′54.41641″E

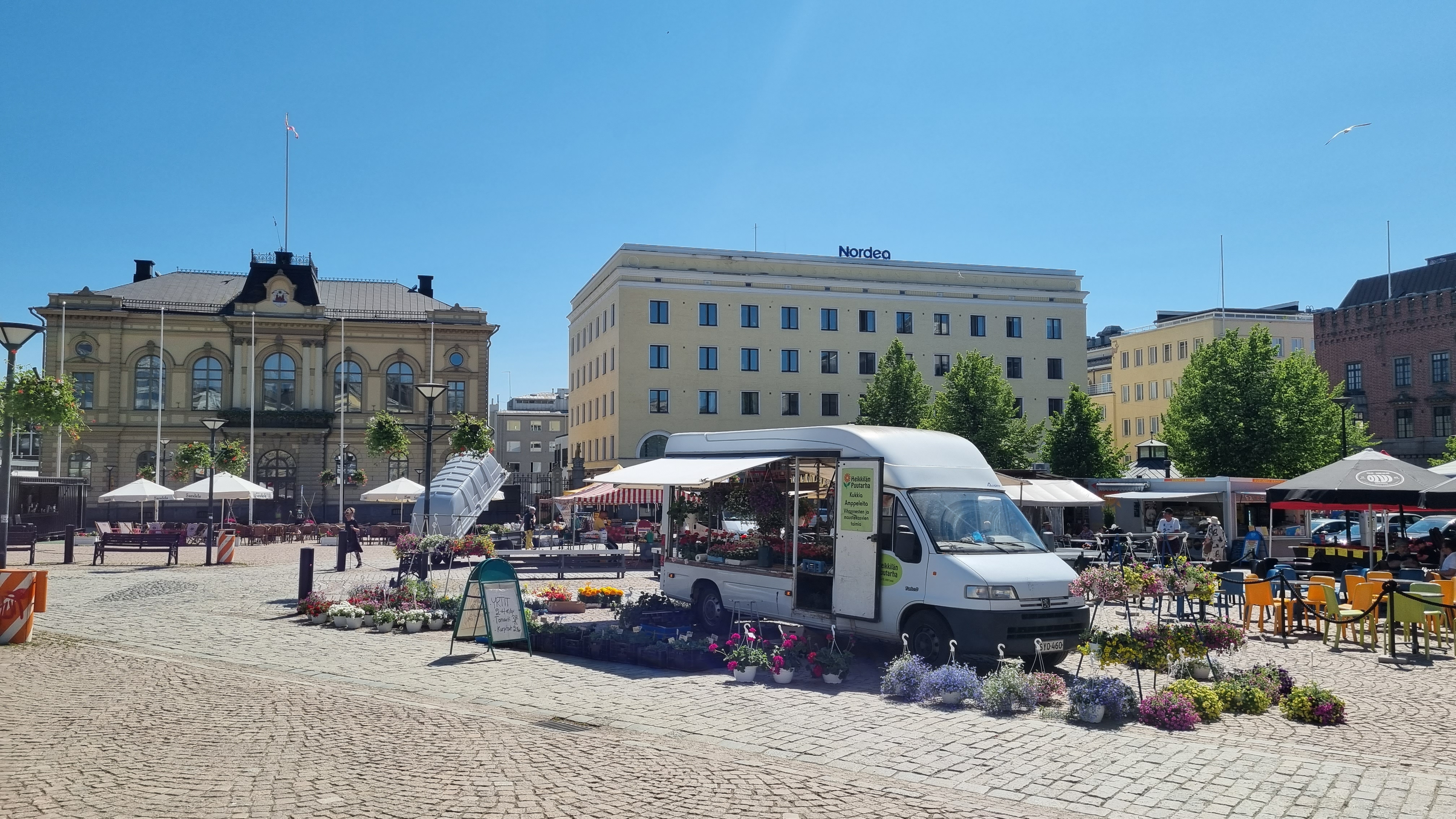
The market square in June 2023

The Hämeenlinna Market Square (Finnish: Hämeenlinnan kauppatori) is the most significant town square in the city center of Hämeenlinna in Kanta-Häme, Finland, where most of the city's market square trade takes place. The market square is located in the Saaristenmäki district on the same site where it was already located in the 1775 town plan. In the new plan drawn up by C. L. Engel in 1832 after the Great Fire of Hämeenlinna, the market and the streets surrounding it remained in their old places. The market square hosts many events and fairs, especially during the summer, and the monthly festival, for example, is held on the first Tuesday of each month. The market has also hosted concerts and other public events.

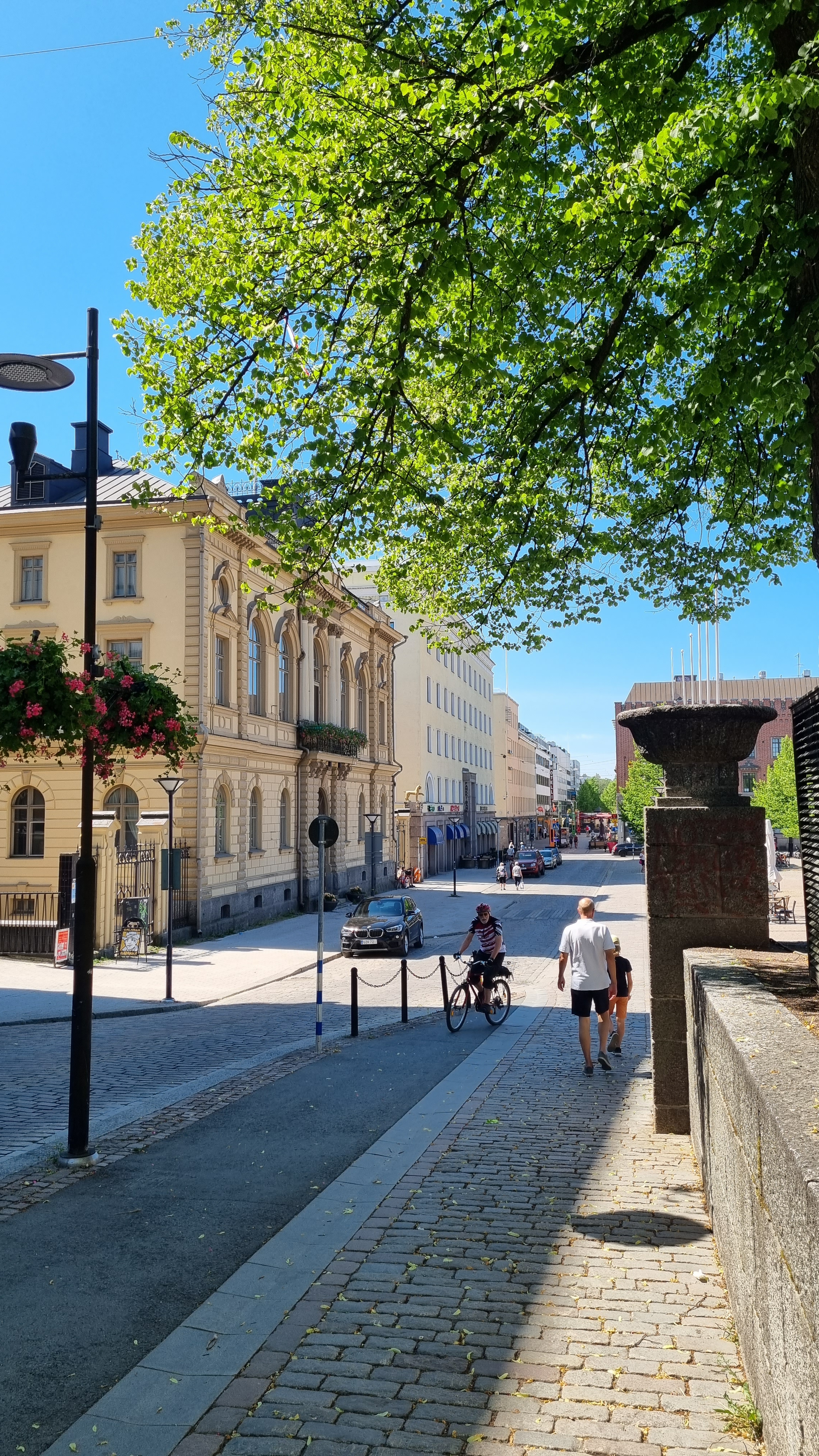
Raatihuoneenkatu next to the Market Square.

The market covers the whole block, measuring 100 m in the east-west direction and 85 m in the north-south direction. In the western part of the square, however, there is a kiosk building and a small parking lot, and on the eastern side there is a similarly sized square park, which means that the actual area that will be used as a square resembles a square. The market square is bordered by the Raatihuoneenkatu, Linnankatu, Hallituskatu and Sibeliuksenkatu streets.

There are many buildings from different eras and styles on the edge of the market square. The most significant of these are the Hämeenlinna Church (Jean Louis Desprez, 1798), the former County Government House (C. L. Engel, 1834) and the Hämeenlinna Town Hall (Alfred Cawén, 1888). In addition, the Linna Shopping Center is located in the block to the west of the square. The market park has a fountain, two market pavilions built in the 1910s and statues of Paavo Cajander and Larin-Kyösti. The park was designed by Armas Lindgren in 1910.

== Gallery ==
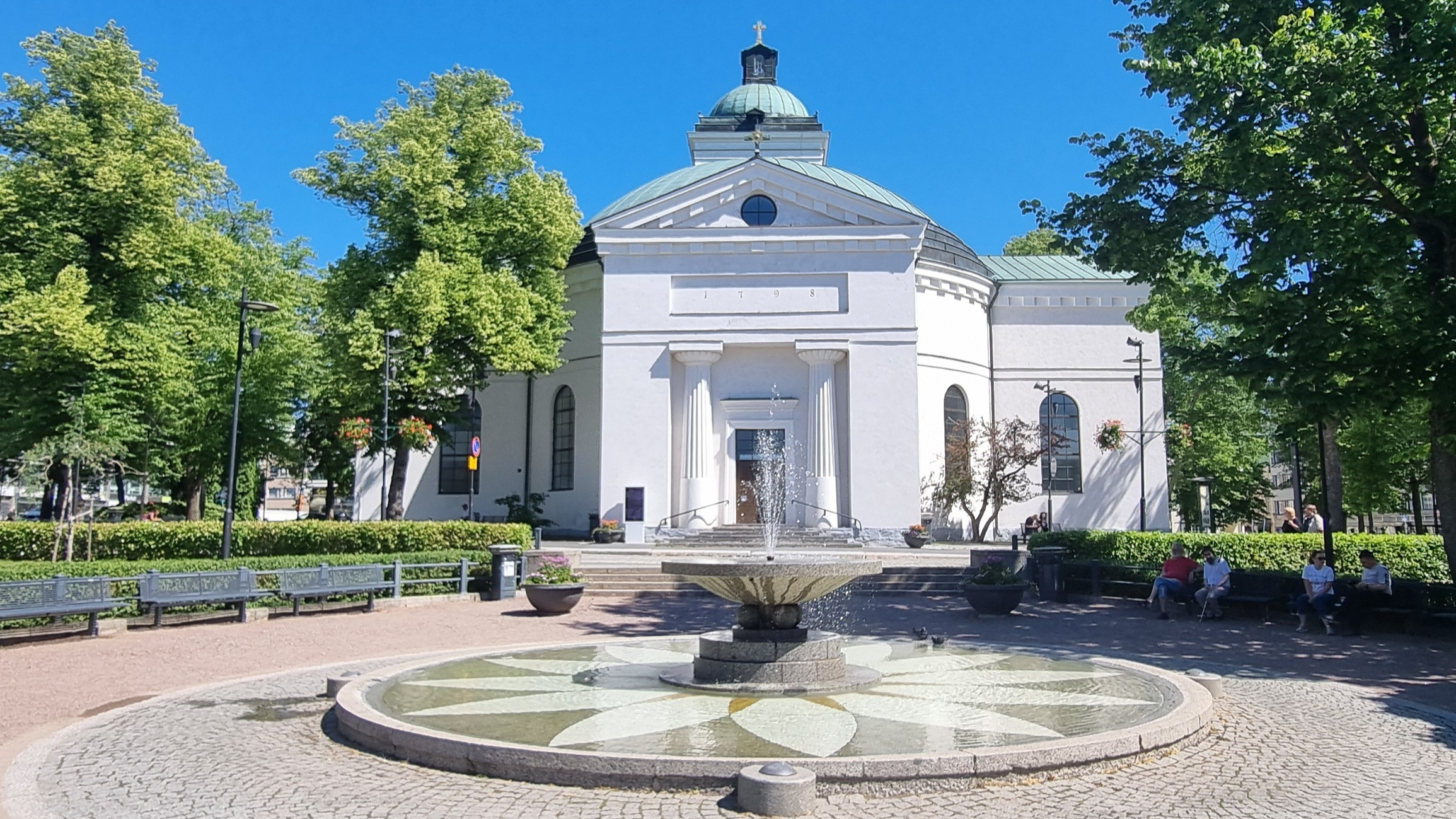
The Church of Hämeenlinna by architect Louis Jean Desprez. The church was completed in 1798.

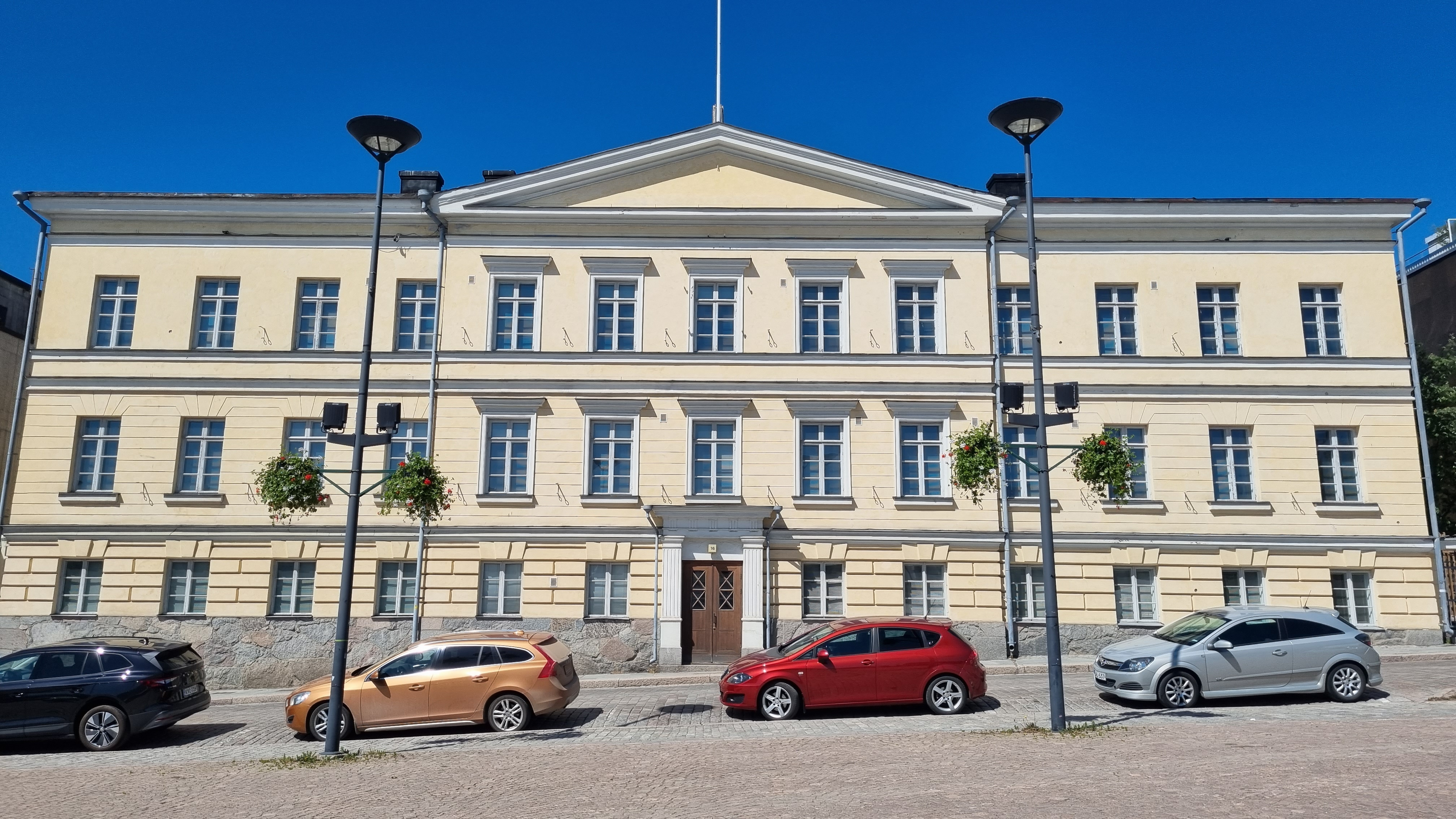
Hämeenlinna Governor Palace designed by Carl Ludvig Engel in 1834.

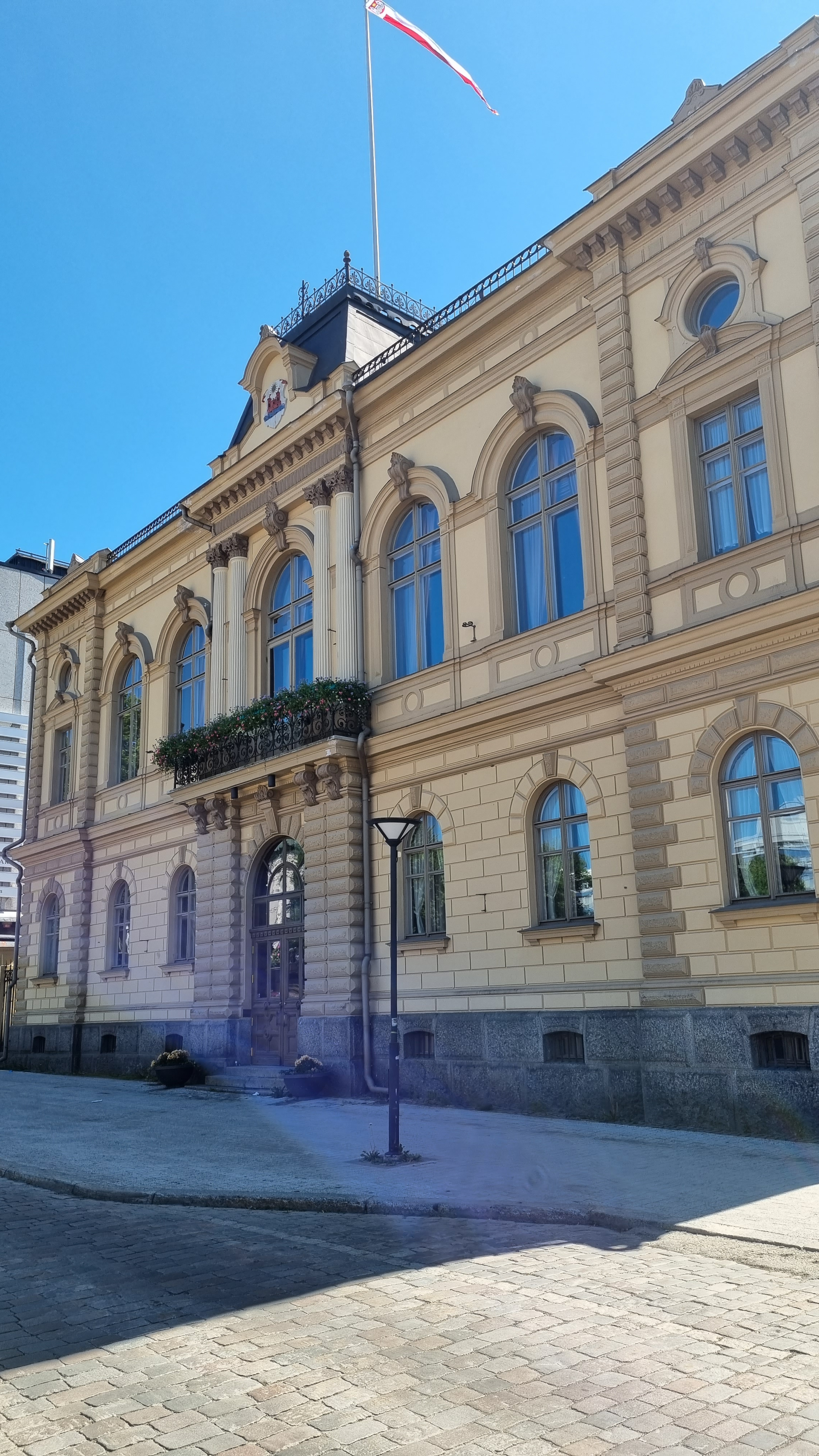
Town Hall was designed by Alfred Cawén in 1888.

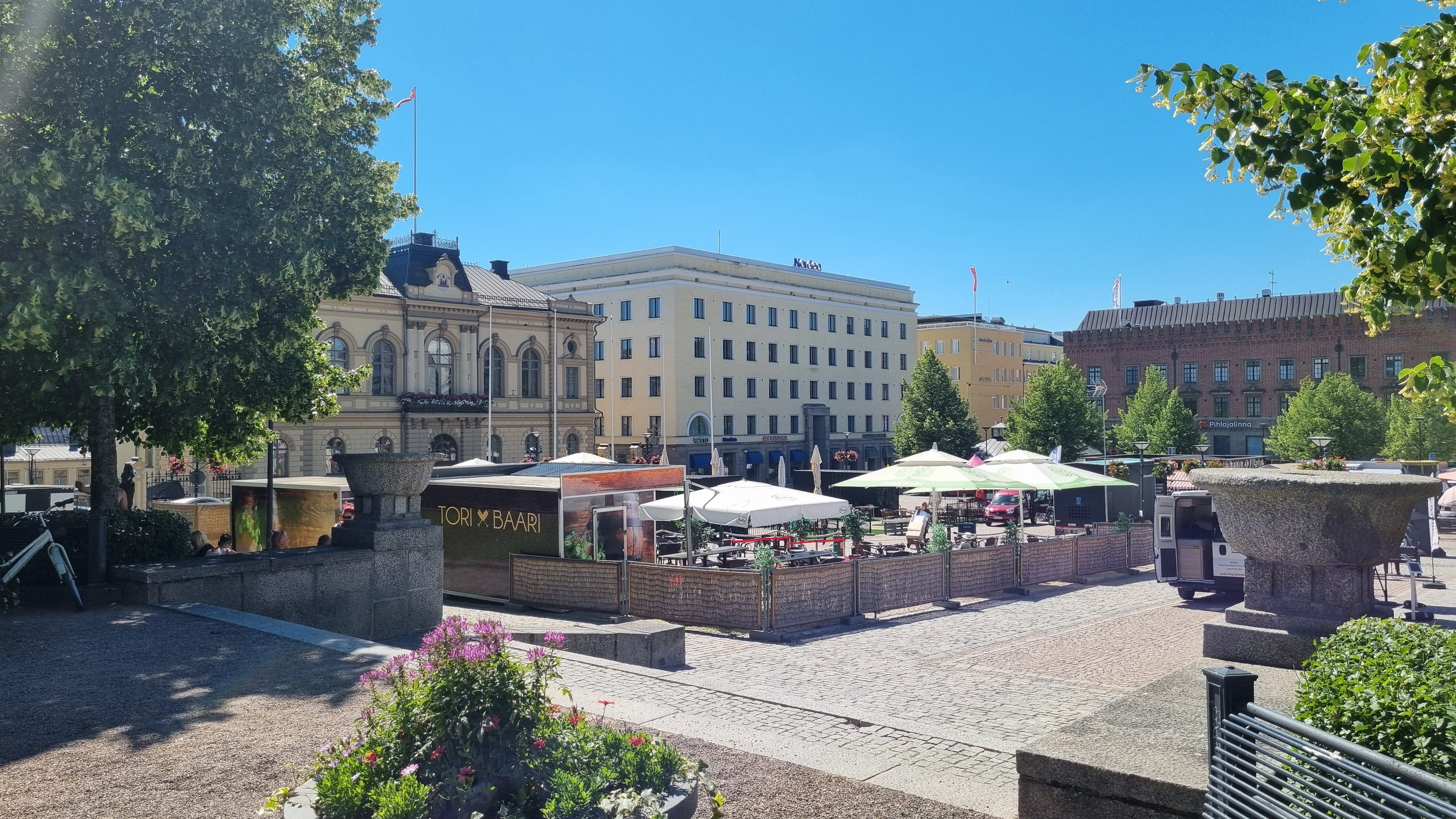
Market Square.
