= Hämeenlinna =

City in Kanta-Häme, Finland

Hämeenlinna Tavastehus
- City
- Hämeenlinnan kaupunki Tavastehus stad City of Hämeenlinna
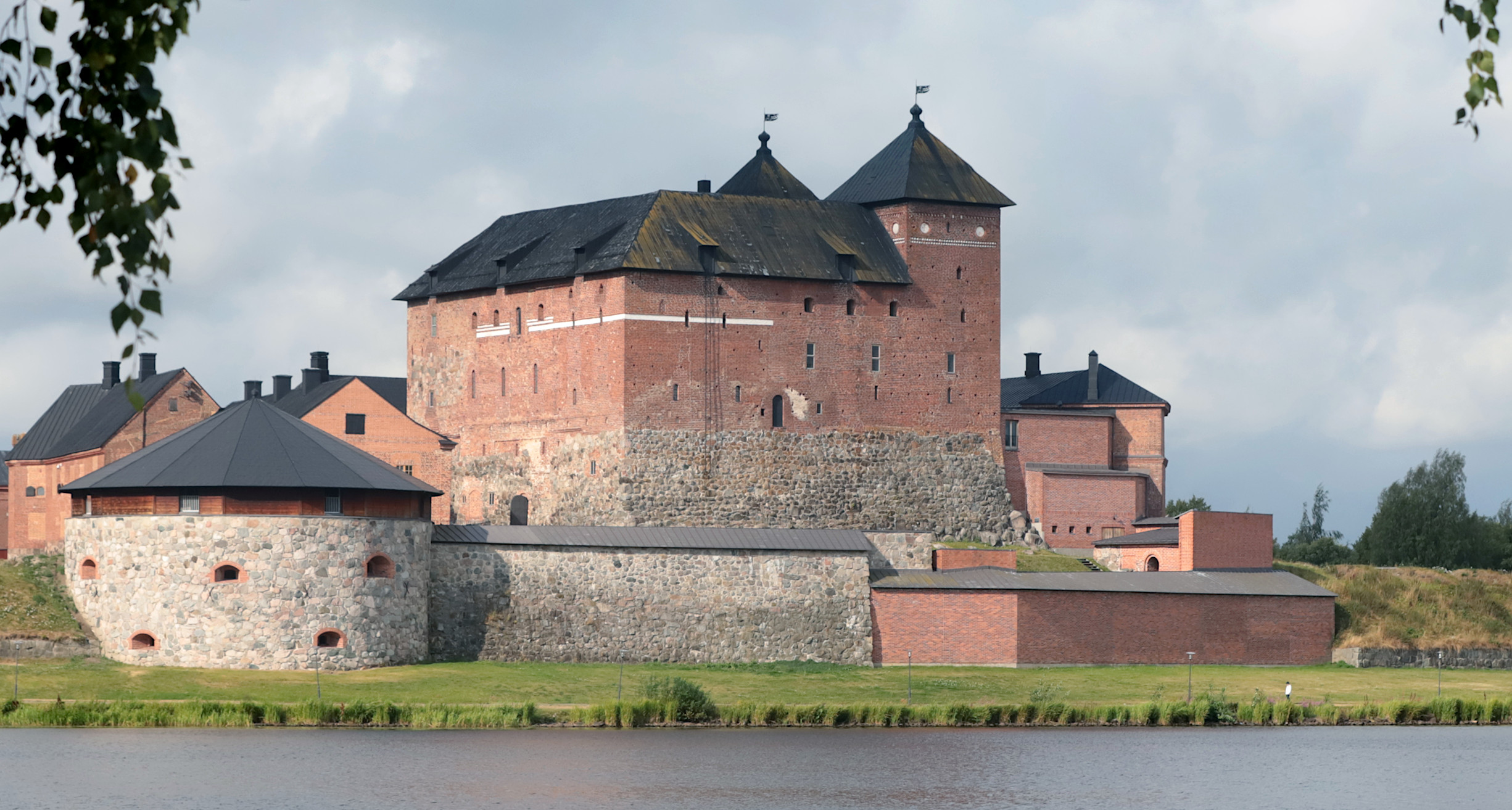
- Häme Castle, the most notable attraction in Hämeenlinna.

- Coat of arms
- Nickname: Hämpton
- Location of Hämeenlinna in Finland
- Interactive map of Hämeenlinna
- Coordinates: 60°59′40″N 24°28′00″E
- Country: Finland
- Region: Kanta-Häme
- Sub-region: Hämeenlinna
- Charter: 1639

Government
  - City manager: Olli-Poika Parviainen

Area (2018-01-01)
  - Total: 2,031.53 km^{2} (784.38 sq mi)
  - Land: 1,785.35 km^{2} (689.33 sq mi)
  - Water: 245.79 km^{2} (94.90 sq mi)
  - Rank: 34th largest in Finland

Population (2025-12-31)
  - Total: 68,614
  - Rank: 15th largest in Finland
  - Density: 38.43/km^{2} (99.5/sq mi)

Population by native language
  - Finnish: 91.3% (official)
  - Swedish: 0.4%
  - Others: 8.3%

Population by age
  - 0 to 14: 14.5%
  - 15 to 64: 59.3%
  - 65 or older: 26.2%
- Time zone: UTC+02:00 (EET)
  - Summer (DST): UTC+03:00 (EEST)
- Website: hameenlinna.fi

Hämeenlinna (Finnish: [ˈhæmeːnˌlinːɑ]; Swedish: Tavastehus; Karelian: Hämienlinna; Latin: Tavastum or Croneburgum) is a city in Finland and the regional capital of Kanta-Häme. It is located in the southern interior of the country and on the shores of Lake Vanajavesi. The population of Hämeenlinna is approximately 69,000, while the sub-region has a population of approximately 94,000. It is the 15th most populous municipality in Finland, and the 14th most populous urban area in the country.

Hämeenlinna was located in the heart of the historic province of Häme (Tavastia). Since then, Hämeenlinna has remained an important regional centre. The medieval Häme Castle (also known as Tavastia Castle) is located in the town.

Hämeenlinna is known as the birthplace of the Finnish national composer Jean Sibelius and designer Antti Nurmesniemi. It is now part of the Kanta-Häme region and was the residence of the Governor of the province of Southern Finland until 2010. Nearby cities include the capital Helsinki (98 km or 61 mi), Tampere (73 km or 45 mi) and Lahti (72 km or 45 mi), the regional centre of Päijät-Häme.

The neighbouring municipalities of Hämeenlinna are Akaa, Asikkala, Hattula, Hausjärvi, Hollola, Janakkala, Loppi, Padasjoki, Pälkäne, Tammela, Urjala and Valkeakoski. The former municipalities of Hauho, Kalvola, Lammi, Renko and Tuulos were merged with Hämeenlinna on 1 January 2009; with these mergers, the municipality of Hattula is almost completely surrounded by Hämeenlinna.

The coat of arms of Hämeenlinna is based on the 17th-century town seal, which in turn refers to the Häme Castle built on the shores of the Lake Vanajavesi in the Middle Ages, near which the city was founded. The current coat of arms was designed by Gustaf von Numers on the basis of the old coat of arms, and was confirmed on September 21, 1956.

== Etymology ==
The name Hämeenlinna comes from Häme Castle; the name is composed of Hämeen ('of Häme') and linna ('castle').

== History ==
=== Kingdom of Sweden: 1200–1809 ===
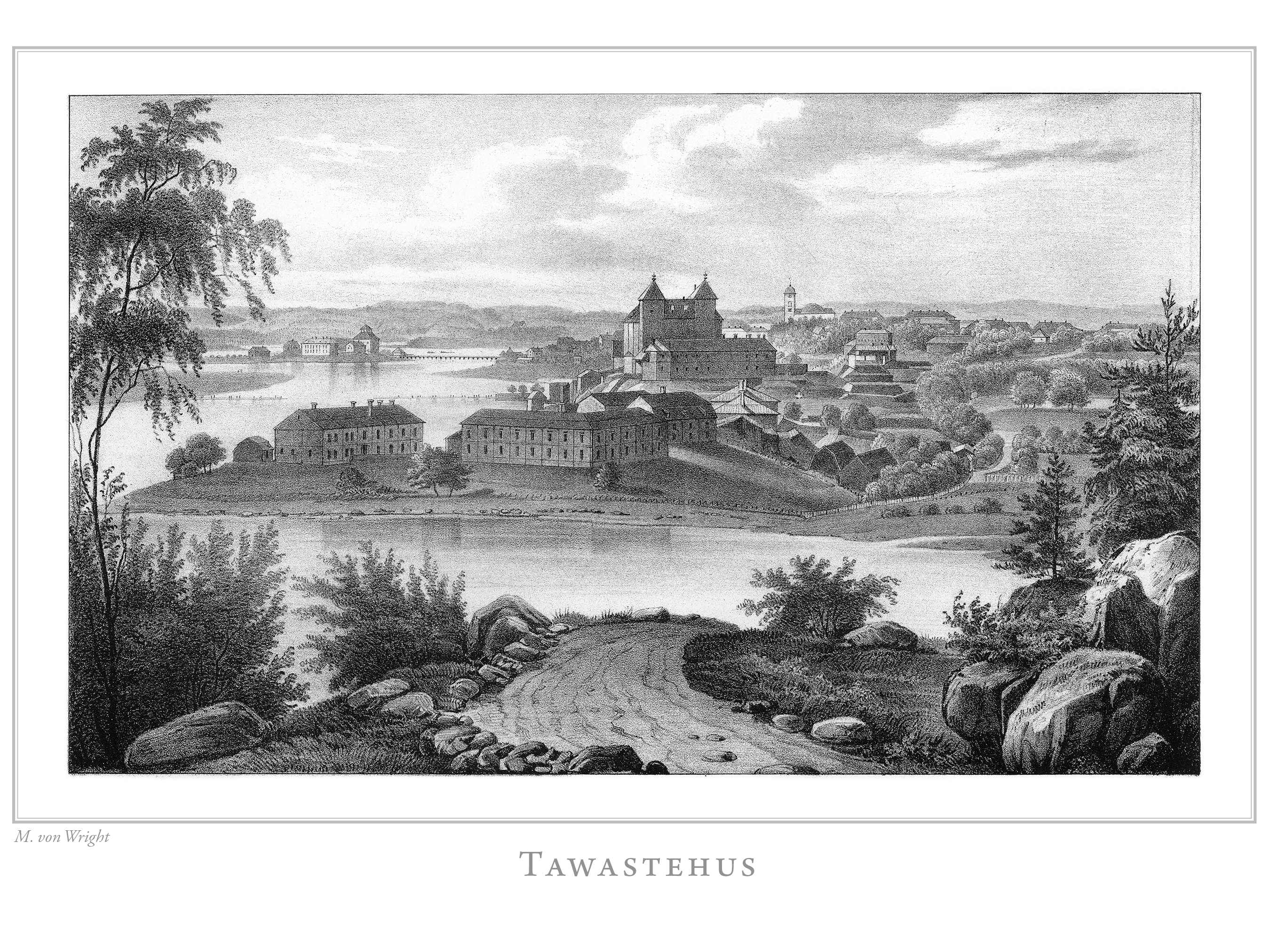
Hämeenlinna by Magnus von Wright between 1845 and 1852.

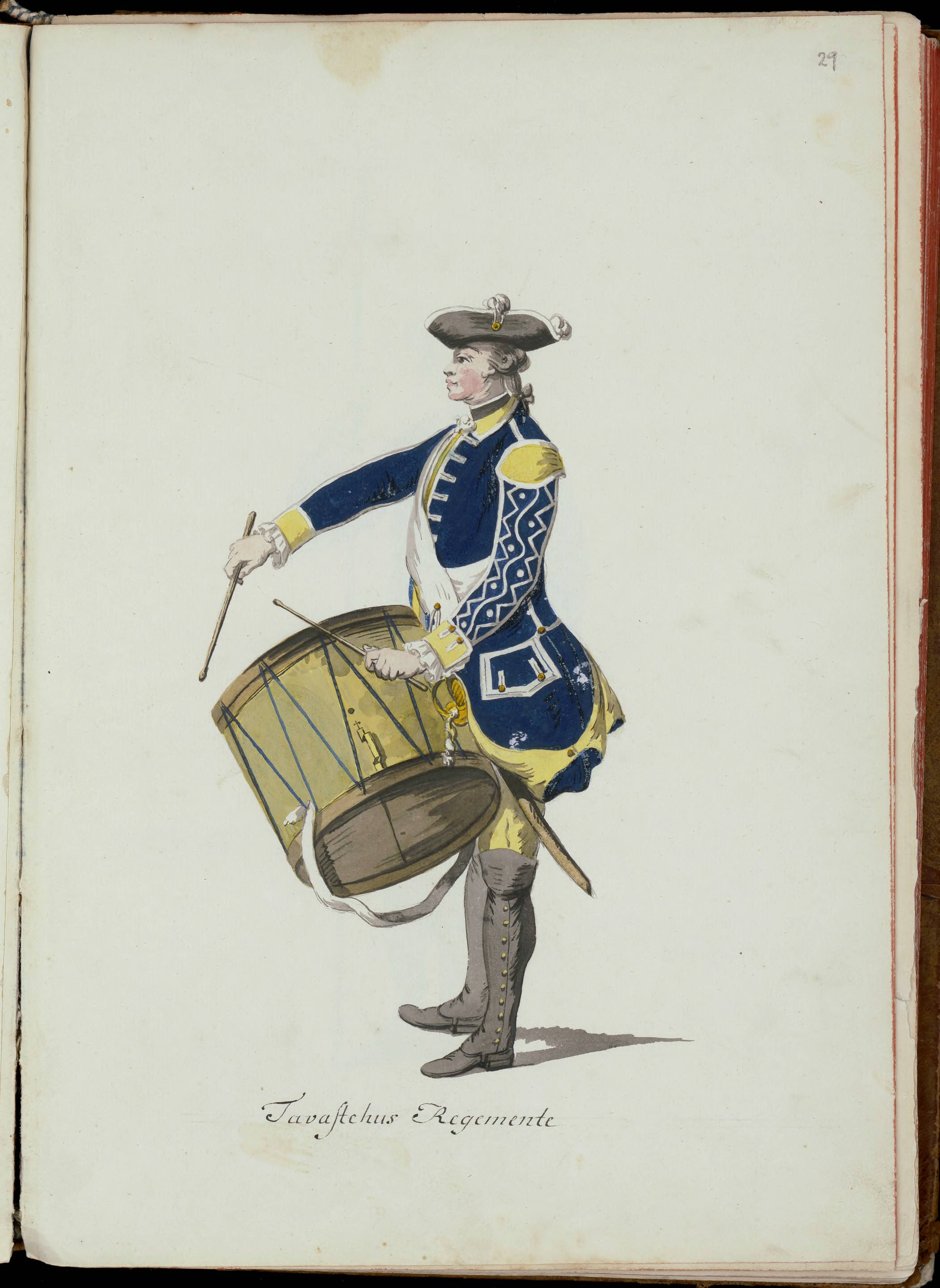
Häme Regiment was founded in 1626.

Vanaja is the name of a settlement near lake Vanajavesi that had been in existence since the Viking Age. The Häme Castle was built in the late 13th century by the order of Regent Birger Jarl to secure Swedish power in central Finland. A village was established near Häme Castle to provide services and goods to its inhabitants.

The village was granted city rights as the first inland city in Finland on January 19, 1639, by Count Per Brahe the Younger, but Hämeenlinna, which still looked more like a rural village, developed very slowly—a common problem for inland cities in Finland when compared to more prosperous coastal cities. In 1777, King Gustav III of Sweden moved it one kilometre (0.6 miles) south to the hill on which it still stands.

Hämeenlinna has hosted numerous royal and imperial visits, including the visits of the Kings of Sweden Gustavus Adolphus, Adolf Frederick, Gustav III, and Gustav IV Adolf.

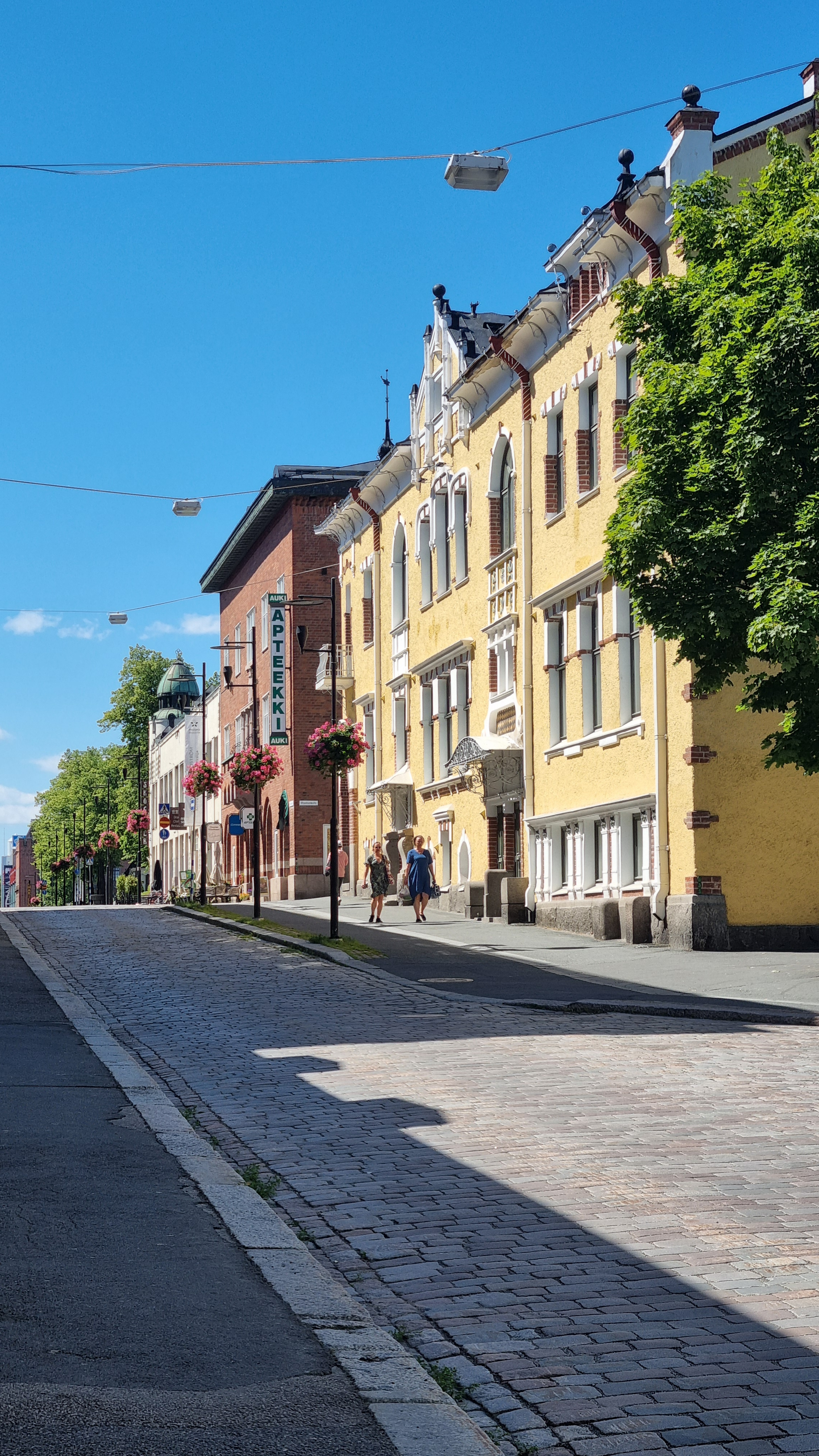
Raatihuoneenkatu.

=== Republic of Finland: 1917–present ===
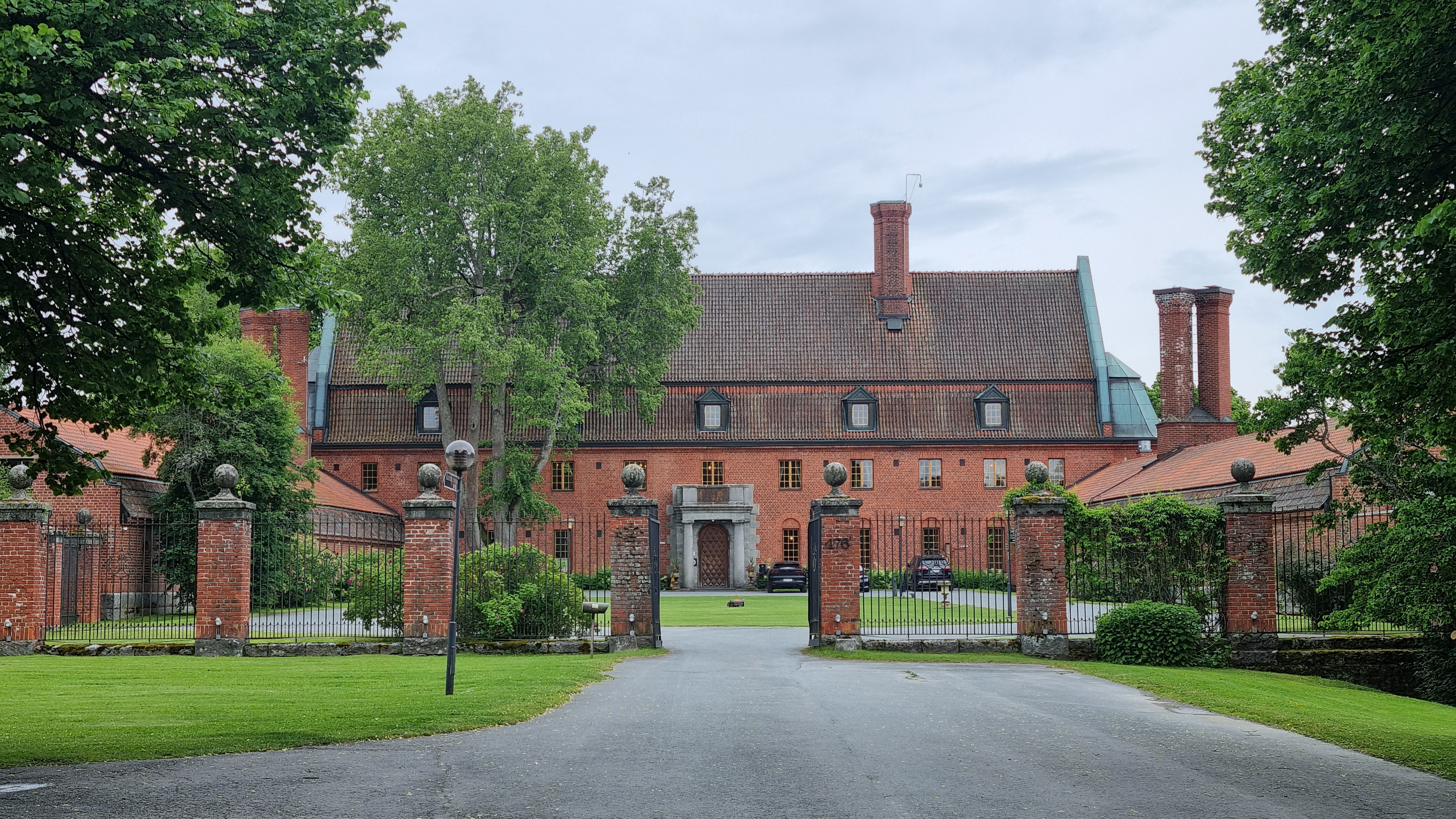
Vanajanlinna Manor was designed as a hunting lodge by Sigurd Frosterus.

During the Finnish Civil War in 1918, Hämeenlinna was initially in the area controlled by the Reds, but the Whites captured the city with the help of the Germans in the Battle of Hämeenlinna. After the war, the Hämeenlinna prison camp established for Red prisoners operated in the Poltinaho barracks area, and it was known as one of the most notorious high-discipline camps in the history of the Civil War, where female prisoners were also kept. By mid-September, over 2,000 Red prisoners died in the prison camp, mainly for communicable diseases such as smallpox, scarlet fever, typhus and Spanish flu.

After World War II, Hämeenlinna underwent significant transformation as Finland shifted from a wartime economy to peacetime recovery. The city experienced substantial reconstruction efforts, which included the renovation of damaged infrastructure and the development of new housing to accommodate returning soldiers and their families.

Häme County received 73,812 war refugees from Karelia. Of all the war refugees, 90 percent were Finns. Hämeenlinna specifically welcomed these refugees, and the Ojoinen Borough was constructed to accommodate them.

The post-war period saw an increase in population as people moved to Hämeenlinna for job opportunities in various sectors. Hämeenlinna also embraced industrialisation during this era, with manufacturing becoming a cornerstone of its economy. The city's strategic location facilitated trade and transport, further promoting economic development.

The establishment of educational institutions, such as the Häme University of Applied Sciences, contributed to the city's growth and modernisation. Additionally, cultural initiatives flourished, with museums and theaters enhancing the local cultural landscape. The Artillery Museum of Finland, which opened in 1997, became a key attraction, showcasing the military history and heritage of the region.

The Prime Ministers and ministers of Finland and Sweden gathered for a historic and joint meeting in Hämeenlinna in 2009.

== Geography ==
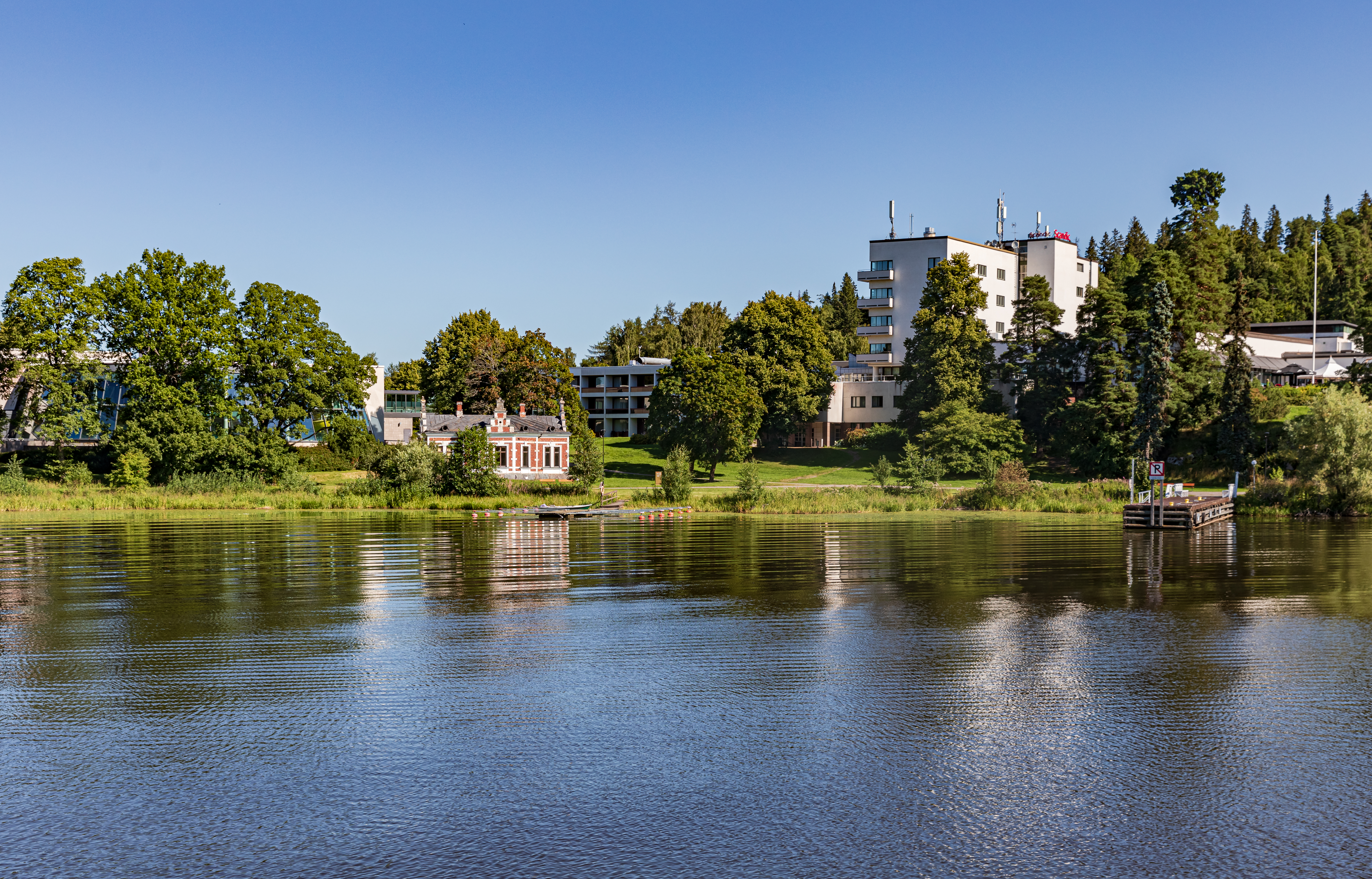
Aulanko next to Vanajavesi.

There are a total of 339 lakes wholly or partly in the area of the city of Hämeenlinna. The largest of them are Lake Vanajavesi, Lake Kukkia and Lake Kuohijärvi. The main features of the Hämeenlinna landscape are the Häme Lake Plateau, the Vanajavesi Valley and the Kanta-Häme Grove Center. In many places, the landscapes are marked by the prosperous Tavastian agricultural culture.

The city has several nature reserves, the largest of which are located in the popular recreation areas of Aulanko and Ahvenisto on the outskirts of the city. In total, there are 31 Natura 2000 areas in the city of Hämeenlinna. In addition, Hämeenlinna has Finland's first national urban park, established in 2001.

=== Climate ===
Climate data for Hämeenlinna Lammi Pappila (1991–2020 normals, extremes 1963–present)
Month	Jan	Feb	Mar	Apr	May	Jun	Jul	Aug	Sep	Oct	Nov	Dec	Year
Record high °C (°F)	7.7 (45.9)	9.7 (49.5)	15.9 (60.6)	23.7 (74.7)	29.0 (84.2)	31.8 (89.2)	33.2 (91.8)	32.6 (90.7)	26.6 (79.9)	19.2 (66.6)	12.8 (55.0)	10.2 (50.4)	33.2 (91.8)
Mean daily maximum °C (°F)	−3.1 (26.4)	−3.0 (26.6)	1.6 (34.9)	8.5 (47.3)	15.5 (59.9)	19.5 (67.1)	22.0 (71.6)	20.5 (68.9)	14.8 (58.6)	7.5 (45.5)	2.1 (35.8)	−1.0 (30.2)	8.7 (47.7)
Daily mean °C (°F)	−5.8 (21.6)	−6.3 (20.7)	−2.5 (27.5)	3.5 (38.3)	9.8 (49.6)	14.2 (57.6)	16.9 (62.4)	15.1 (59.2)	10.2 (50.4)	4.5 (40.1)	0.2 (32.4)	−3.3 (26.1)	4.7 (40.5)
Mean daily minimum °C (°F)	−8.6 (16.5)	−9.5 (14.9)	−6.2 (20.8)	−1.0 (30.2)	3.9 (39.0)	8.8 (47.8)	11.6 (52.9)	10.5 (50.9)	6.5 (43.7)	1.9 (35.4)	−1.9 (28.6)	−5.6 (21.9)	0.9 (33.6)
Record low °C (°F)	−37.4 (−35.3)	−36.2 (−33.2)	−28.5 (−19.3)	−15.9 (3.4)	−10.7 (12.7)	−2.0 (28.4)	0.9 (33.6)	−0.3 (31.5)	−6.0 (21.2)	−15.7 (3.7)	−22.1 (−7.8)	−34.2 (−29.6)	−37.4 (−35.3)
Average precipitation mm (inches)	49 (1.9)	37 (1.5)	34 (1.3)	32 (1.3)	41 (1.6)	64 (2.5)	79 (3.1)	72 (2.8)	54 (2.1)	66 (2.6)	58 (2.3)	53 (2.1)	639 (25.2)
Average precipitation days	12	9	8	7	8	10	11	10	9	11	11	12	118
Source 1: FMI climatological normals for Finland 1991–2020
Source 2: Record highs and lows 1963–present

=== Cityscape ===
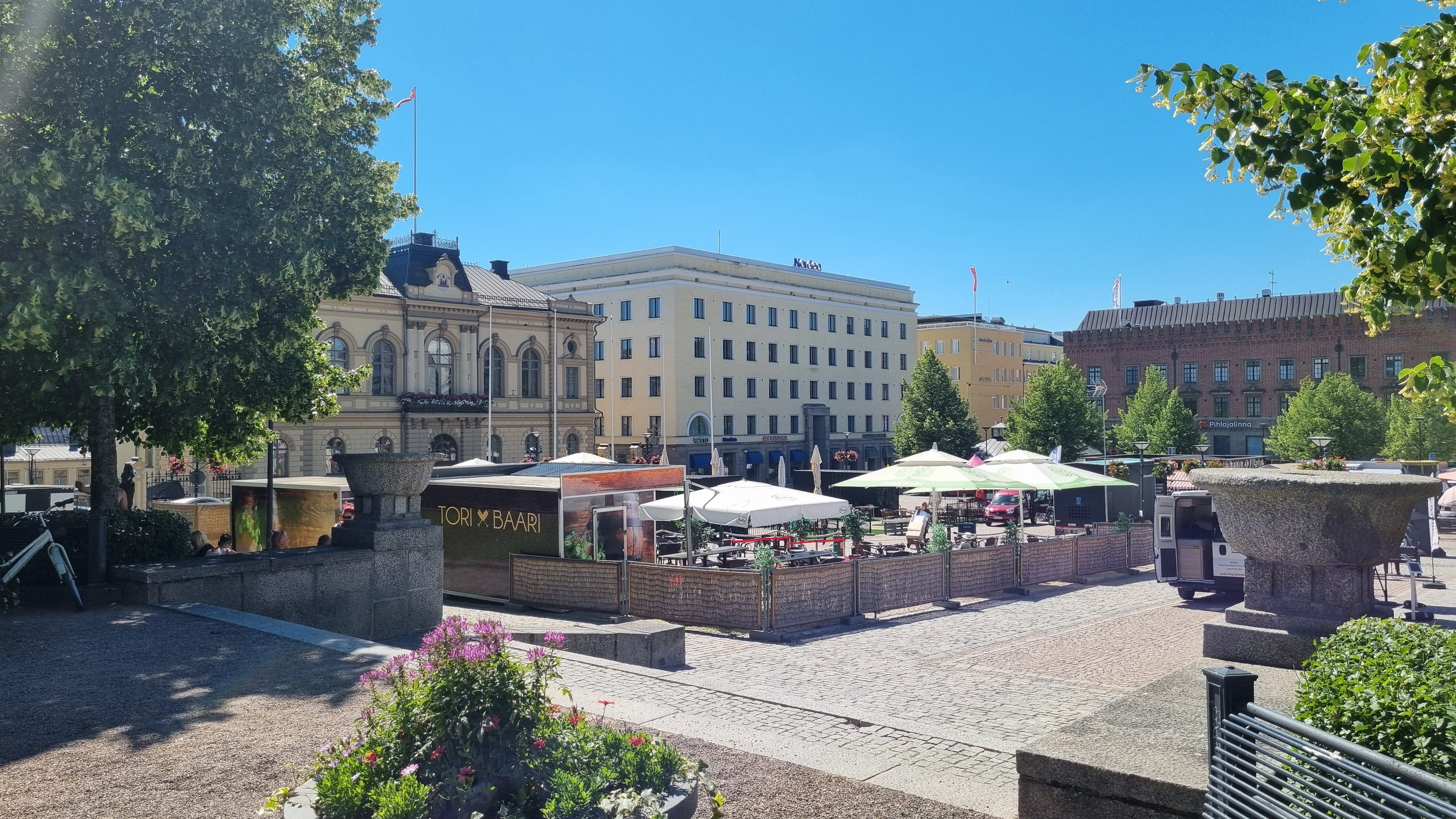
The Market Square in Hämeenlinna. On the left is the City Hall.

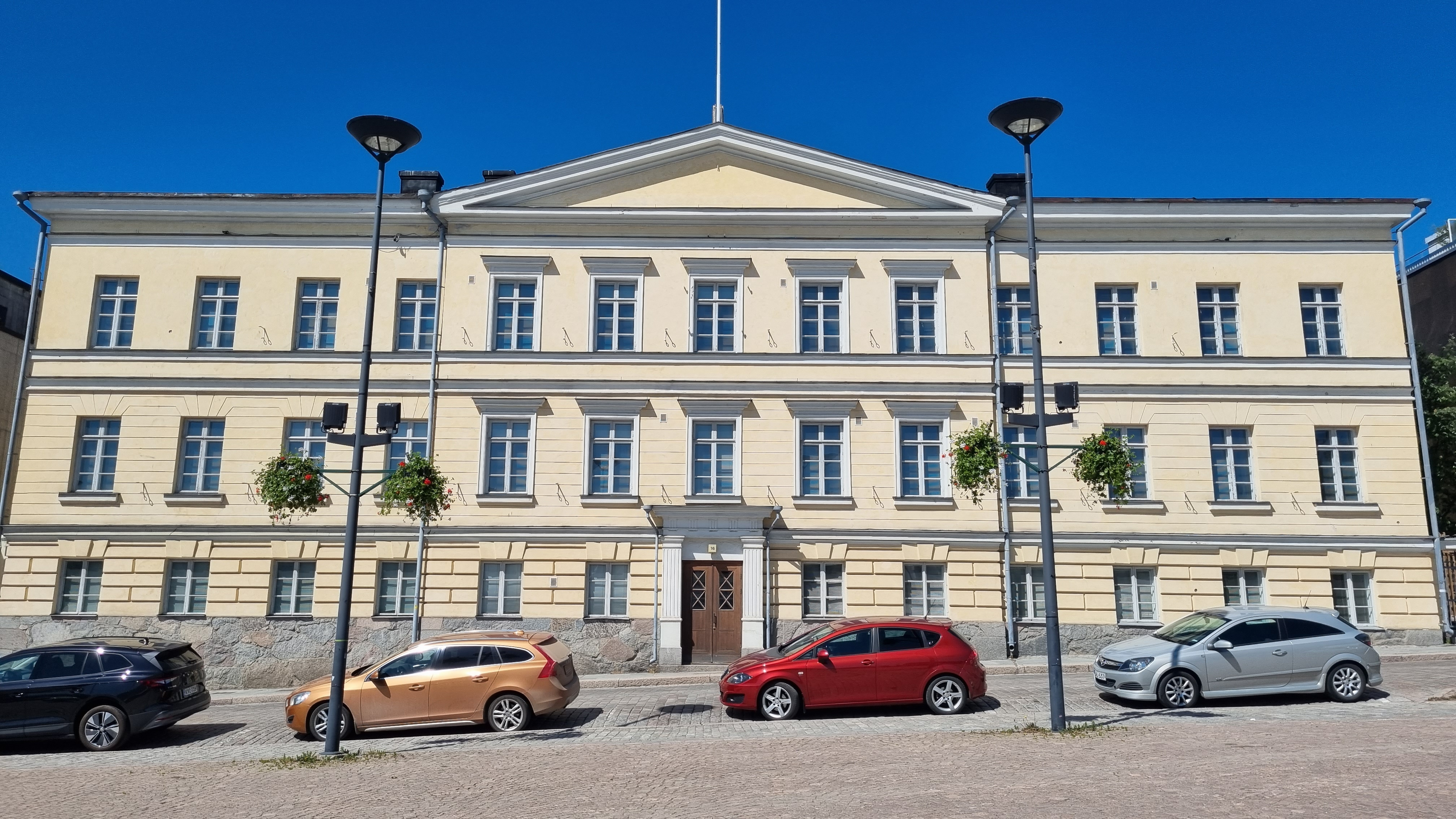
Hämeenlinna Governor's Palace, designed by Carl Ludvig Engel.

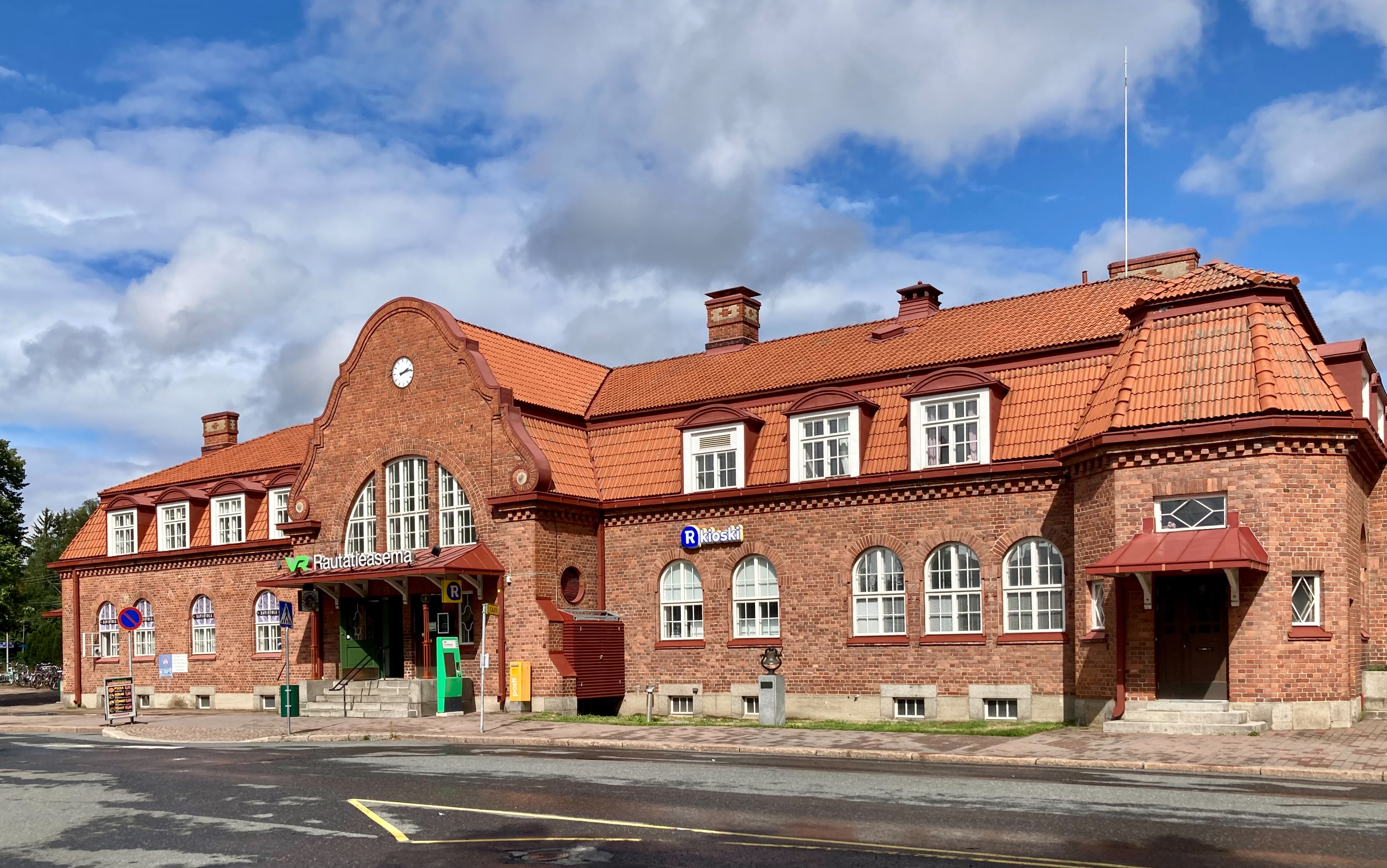
Hämeenlinna railway station.

The center of Hämeenlinna is located on the Saarinen Hill on the shores of Lake Vanajavesi, and is bordered on the west by Highway 3 (E12), while Highway 10 bypasses the city to the south and east.

The street network in the center is based on a grid pattern drawn up by Carl Ludvig Engel in 1832 with the Market Square as its center.

On the edge of the market square are the town hall, Hämeenlinna Church and the Häme County Government House. The city center is divided into four districts, which are Linnanniemi, Koilliskulma, Hämeensaari and Saaristenmäki.

Raatihuoneenkatu, which has been partially transformed into a pedestrian street, is the most significant shopping street in the city center; for example, at the western end of the street, the Goodman Shopping Center was completed in October 2014.

There are plenty of buildings of different styles in the city center, and in proportion to the city's population, it is quite large and densely built. The most significant expansion direction in the city center in the 2010s has been the Keinusaari district on the other side of Lake Vanajavesi, where, for example, the city's railway station is located.

Supplementary construction has also been carried out in the city center on an ongoing basis. The center of Hämeenlinna has been ridiculed as "Finland's largest lit cemetery".

== Demographics ==
=== Population ===
Historical population
Year	Pop.	±% p.a.
1815	1,668	—
1850	2,581	+1.26%
1870	3,065	+0.86%
1890	4,644	+2.10%
1910	6,376	+1.60%
1920	6,735	+0.55%
1930	8,500	+2.35%
1939	9,824	+1.62%
1972	58,030	+5.53%
1980	59,224	+0.25%
1990	61,222	+0.33%
2000	63,033	+0.29%
2010	66,829	+0.59%
2020	67,848	+0.15%
Source: Tilastollinen päätoimisto, Statistics Finland (1972-2020)

The city of Hämeenlinna has 68,614 inhabitants, making it the 15th most populous municipality in Finland. The Hämeenlinna region has a population of 93,827.

Population size 1990–2025
Year	Population
1990	61,222
1995	62,080
2000	63,033
2005	64,271
2010	66,829
2015	68,011
2020	67,848
2025	68,614

=== Languages ===
Population by
mother tongue (2025)
1. Finnish (91.3%)
2. Ukrainian (0.90%)
3. Russian (0.80%)
4. Arabic (0.70%)
5. Estonian (0.70%)
6. Persian (0.60%)
7. Sinhala (0.60%)
8. Other (4.40%)

Hämeenlinna is a monolingual Finnish-speaking municipality. The majority of the population, 62,663 persons (91.3%), spoke Finnish as their first language. In addition, the number of Swedish speakers was 270 persons (0.4%) of the population. Foreign languages were spoken by 8.3% of the population. As English and Swedish are compulsory school subjects, functional bilingualism or trilingualism acquired through language studies is not uncommon.

At least 40 different languages are spoken in Hämeenlinna. The most common foreign languages are Ukrainian (0.9%), Russian (0.8%), Arabic (0.7%), Estonian (0.7%) and Persian (0.6%).

=== Immigration ===
Population by country of birth (2025)
Country of birth	Population	%
Finland	63,082	91.9
Soviet Union	649	0.9
Sri Lanka	431	0.6
Estonia	405	0.6
Ukraine	332	0.5
Iraq	260	0.4
Turkey	239	0.3
Afghanistan	211	0.3
Sweden	204	0.3
Philippines	192	0.3
Other	3,609	5.3

As of 2024, there were 5,308 persons with a foreign background living in Hämeenlinna, or 8% of the population. (Note: Statistics Finland classifies a person as having a "foreign background" if both parents or the only known parent were born abroad.) The number of residents who were born abroad was 5,143, or 8% of the population. The number of persons with foreign citizenship living in Hämeenlinna was 3,809. Most foreign-born citizens came from the former Soviet Union, Estonia, Sri Lanka and Ukraine.

The relative share of immigrants in Hämeenlinna's population is lower than the national average.

=== Religion ===
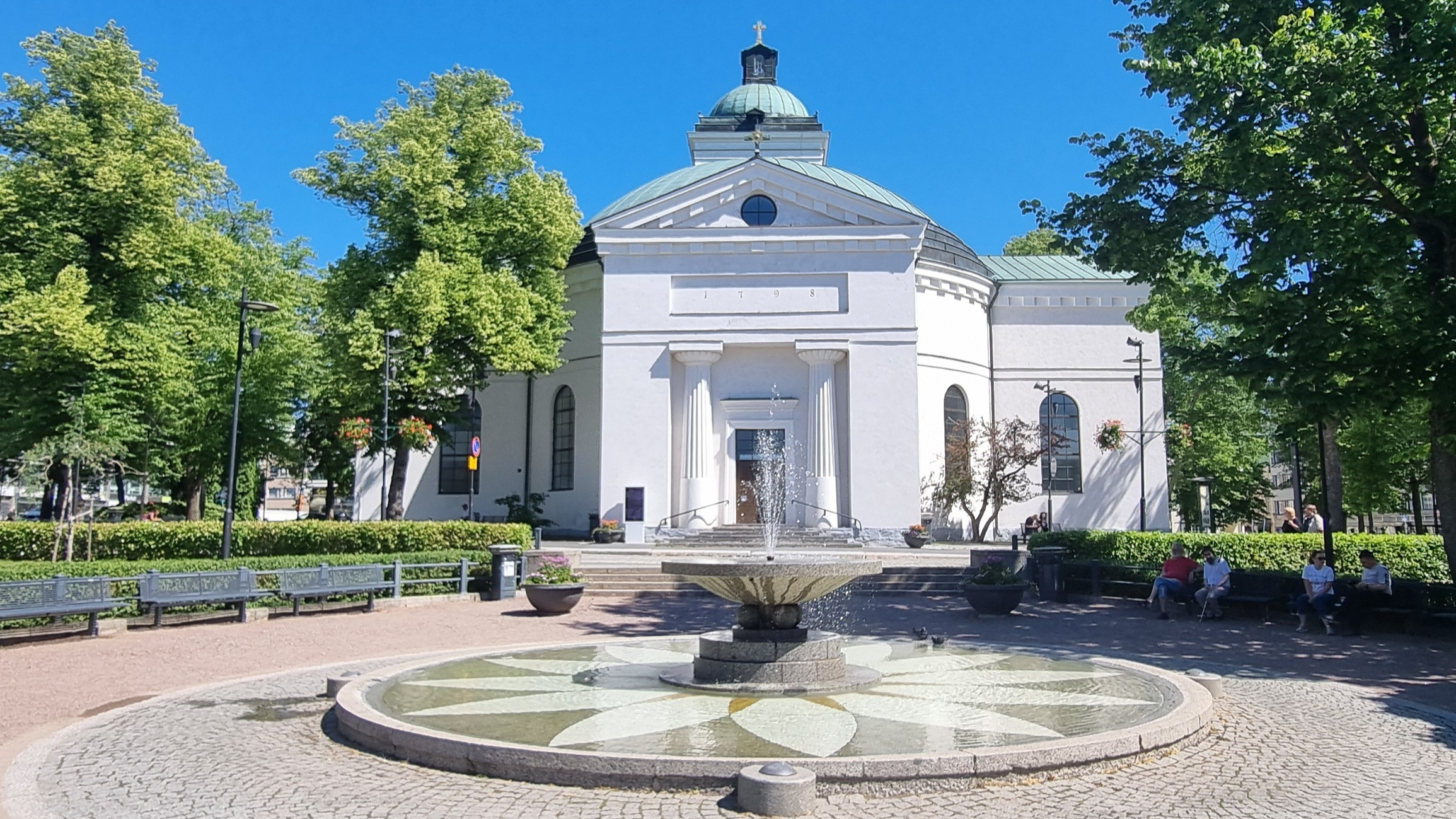
The church of Hämeenlinna by architect Louis Jean Desprez. The church was completed in 1798.

In 2023, the Evangelical Lutheran Church was the largest religious group with 67.8% of the population of Hämeenlinna. Other religious groups accounted for 2.5% of the population. 29.7% of the population had no religious affiliation.

== Commercial and Industrial History ==
=== 17th and 18th Centuries ===
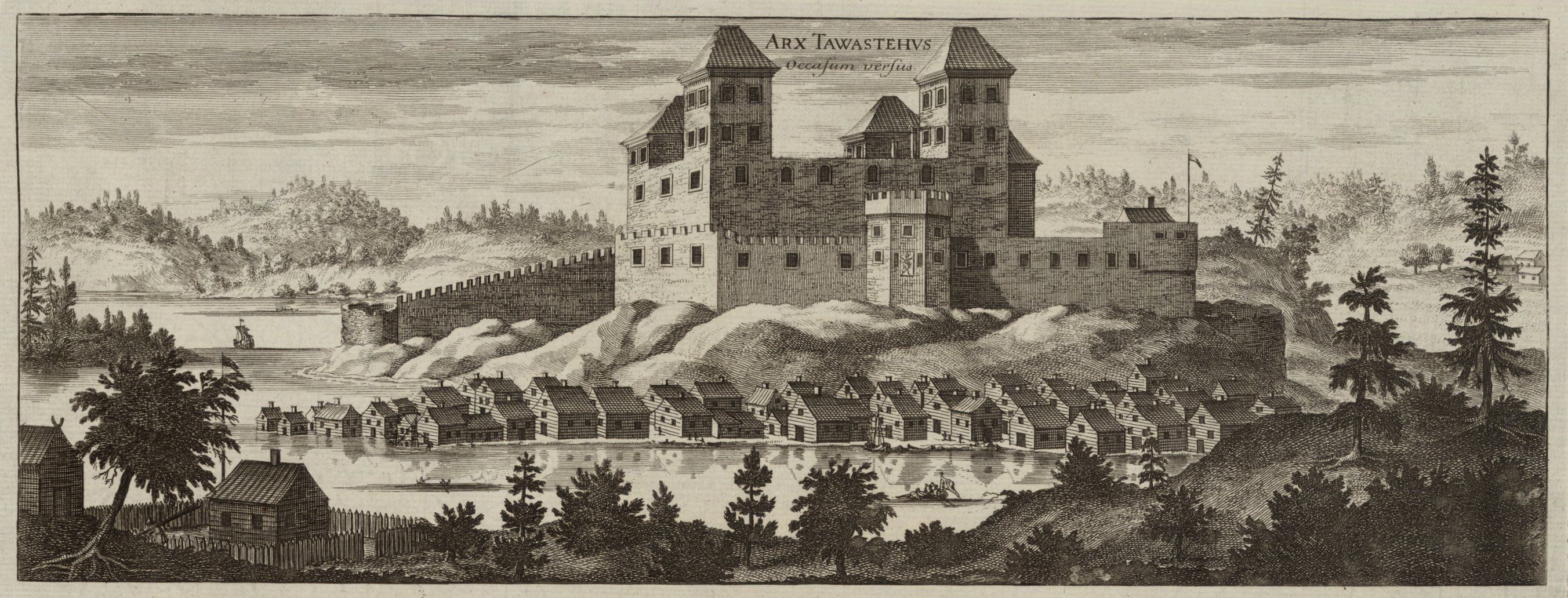
Häme Castle in the 1650s.

An essential livelihood in the town during the 1600s was the markets, which were held regularly, especially around Saint Olaf's Day in July and during the winter markets. At market times, many people gathered in Hämeenlinna, and the production and sale of beer were significant sources of income. Tavern keeping and the production of spirits were also important means of livelihood. In the mid-1700s, a guild system began to form.

Industry in Hämeenlinna began to slowly develop toward the end of the 1700s. In 1761, a flax factory was established where various fabrics were woven. This enterprise operated for about a decade but did not ultimately succeed for long. The more extensive industrialisation period began only later in the 1800s.

Alongside agriculture and craftsmanship, the town's livelihoods included particularly the cultivation of flax and hemp and the textiles made from them. In the Häme region, including the surroundings of Hämeenlinna, flax cultivation was significant throughout the 1700s. Hämeenlinna's position as an inland town was seen as important for developing factories, craftsmen, and plantations, even though these forms of industry were slowly adopted in the town.

=== Distilleries and breweries ===
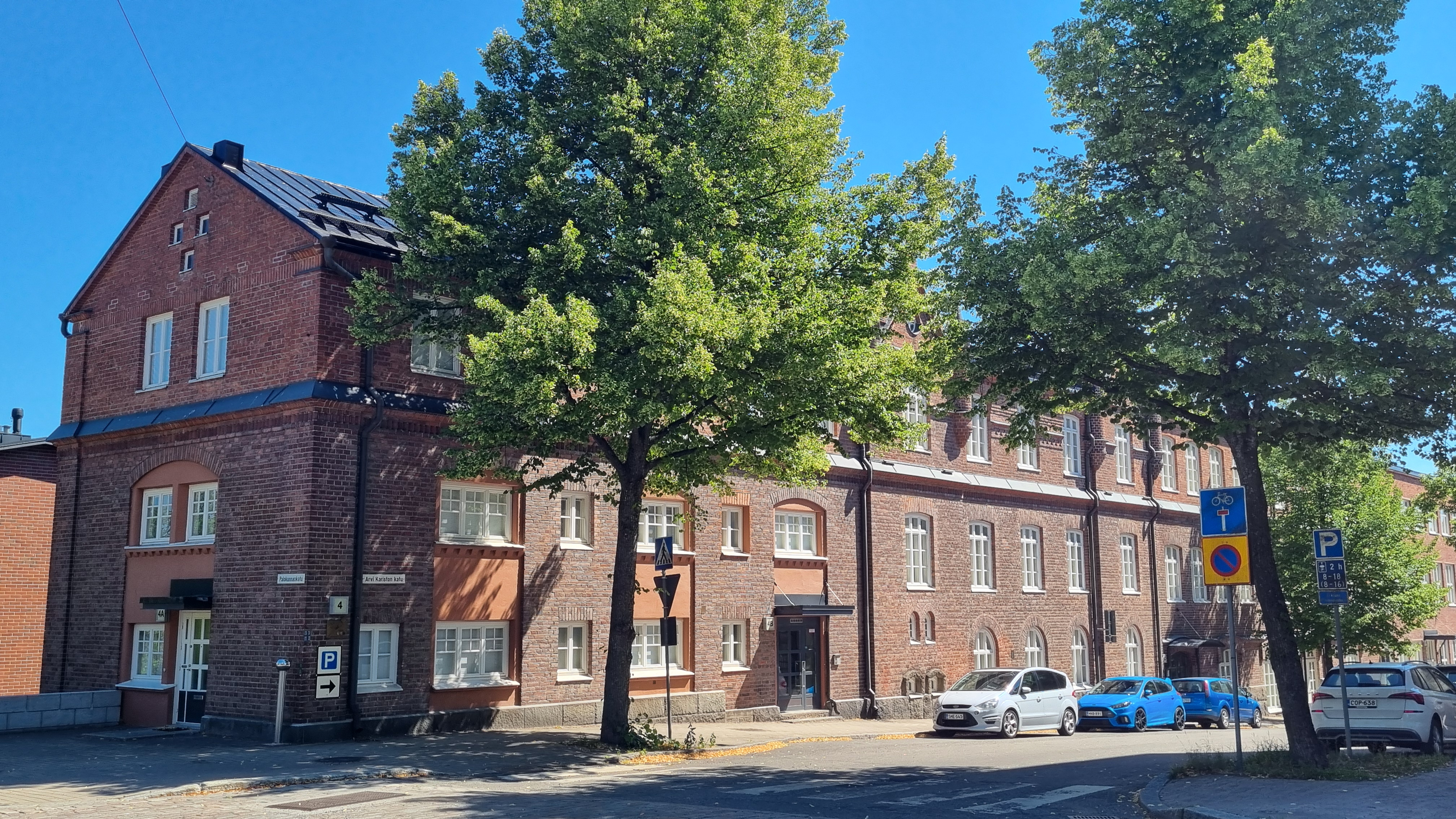
Old Brewery at Arvi Kariston katu.

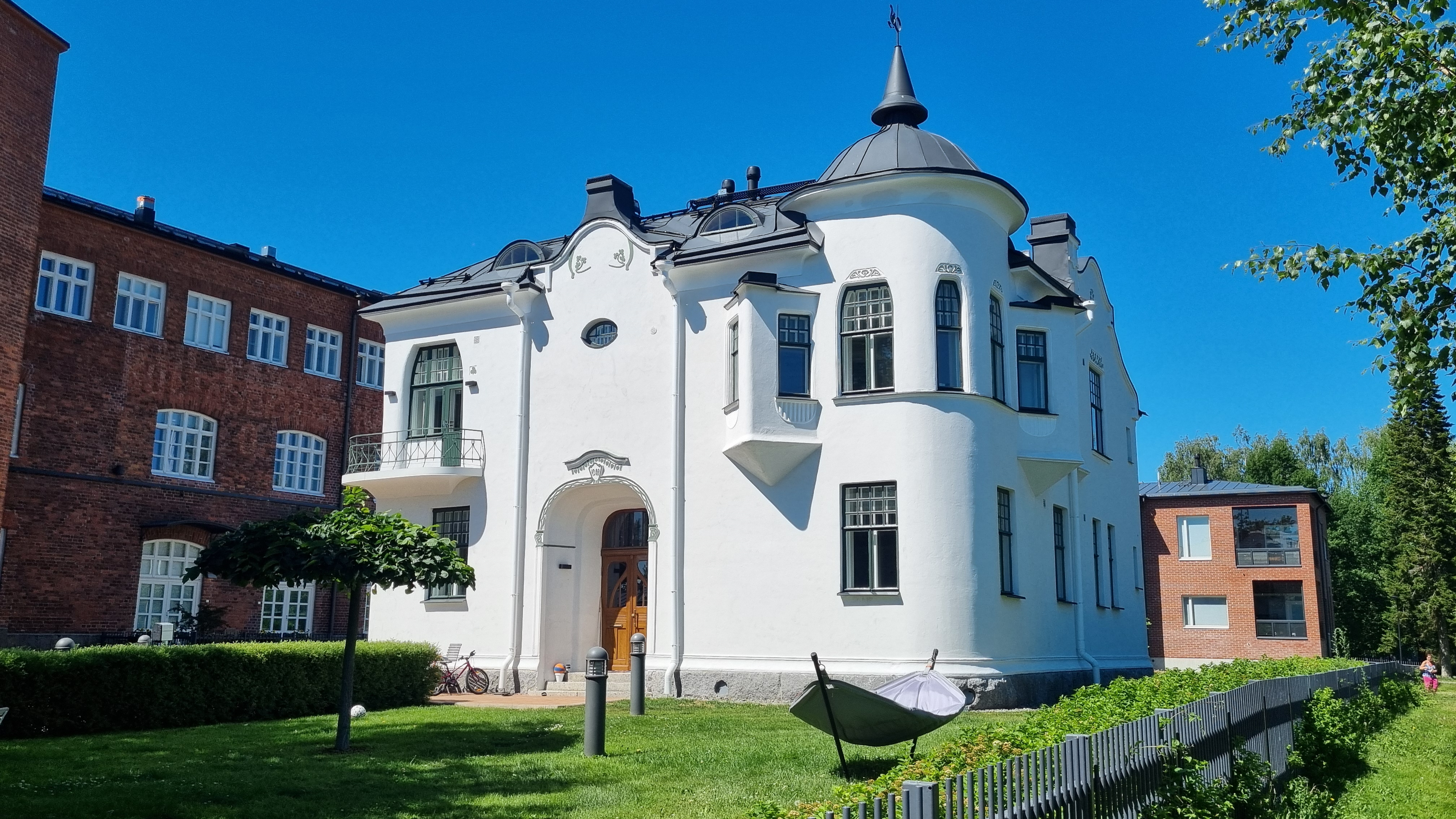
Villa Schmausser in the brewery block.

In the 19th century, Hämeenlinna had a notable history of distilleries and breweries. The beer brewery in Hämeenlinna was founded Johan Fredrik Lönnholtz around 1850.

Ownership of the brewery changed hands in 1883 when J. F. Schmausser purchased it. He continued developing the business and obtained new production and sales rights. In 1904, due to the death of Schmausser, the brewery was managed by various parties until new arrangements were made. The brewery operated under different company names until it ceased operations in 1917.

=== Weaving industry ===
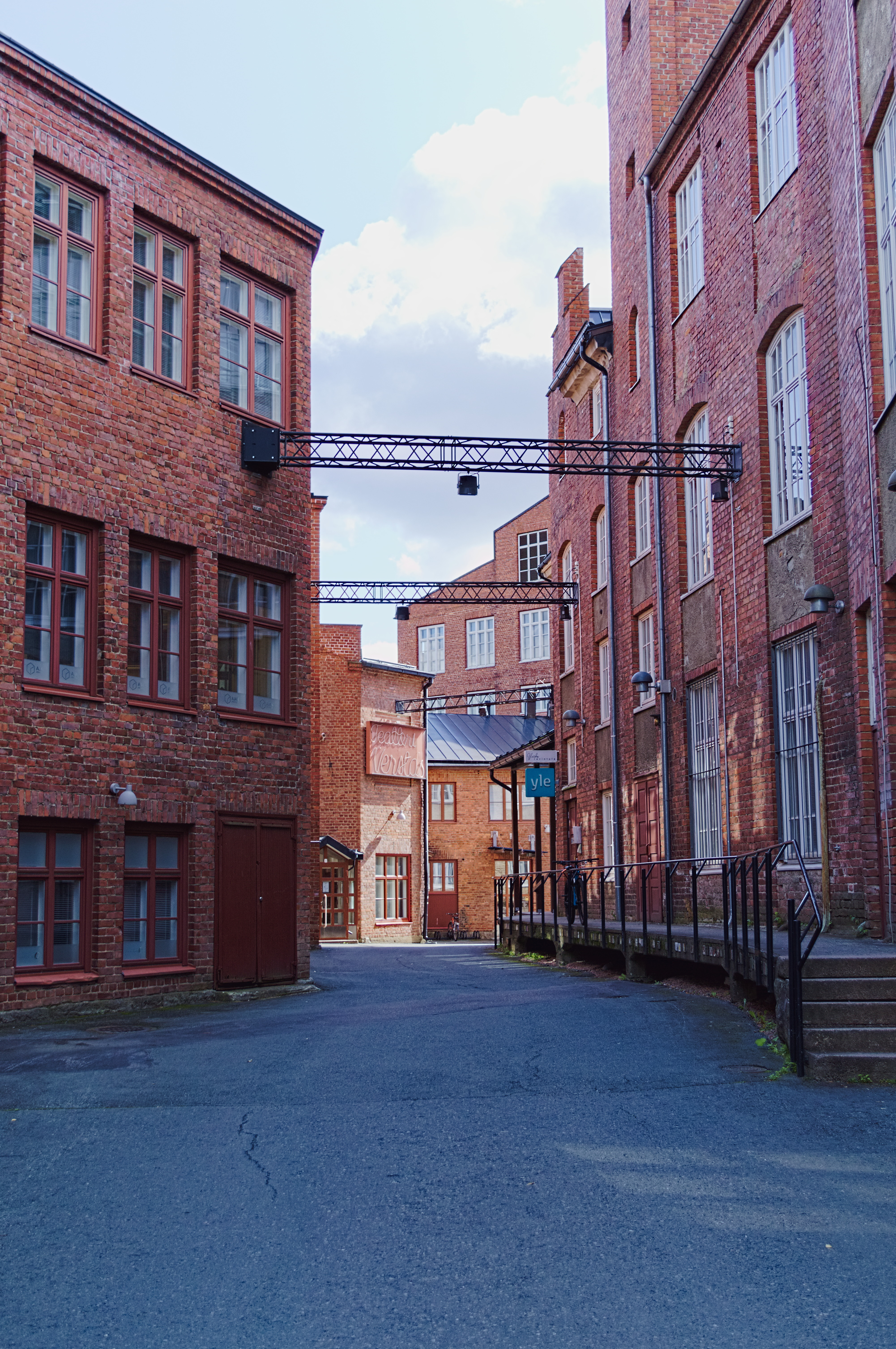
Verkatehdas in Hämeenlinna.

Hämeenlinna Verkatehdas Oy was founded on February 17, 1895, on the shore of Lake Vanajavesi. Initially, a weaving mill and power plant were built, followed by a spinning mill, repair workshops, and villas for the management. The factory quickly became the city's most significant industrial site and was a pioneer in introducing electric lighting in Hämeenlinna.

After the Finnish independence, it grew to become one of the country's largest wool factories. After World War II, there were up to 1,300 employees working at Verkatehdas, and production reached record levels.

== Economy ==
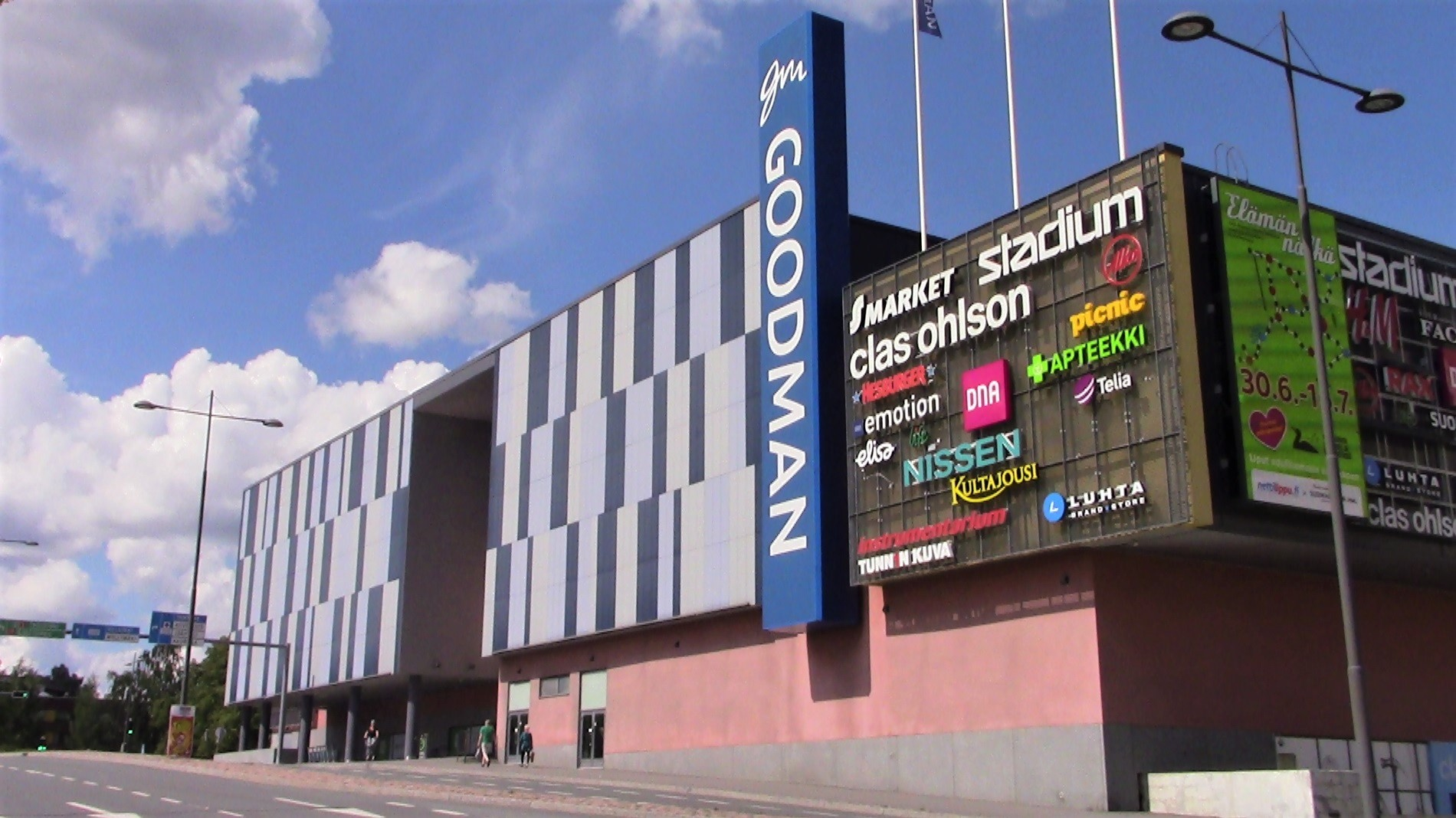
Goodman shopping center in Hämeenlinna is named after singer Irwin Goodman.

=== Largest employers ===
By number of employees:

- City of Hämeenlinna: 2,490
- State of Finland: 2,480
- Kanta-Häme Hospital District: 1,460
- Ruukki (Rautaruukki Oyj): 1,030
- Huhtamäki Oyj: 700
- HAMK University of Applied Sciences: 510
- Kansanterveystyön ky: 490
- Patria Vehicles Oy: 430
- Konecranes Standard Lifting Oy: 330
- Tavastia Education Consortium: 270
- Aina Group Oyj: 250
- Lindström Oy: 175

==== Sunny Car Center case ====
In the 2010s, Hämeenlinna became entangled in the controversial Sunny Car Center initiative, collaborating with businessman Markku Ritaluoma in an ambitious attempt to create Europe's largest car dealership. The project faced persistent challenges and was ultimately abandoned after the cancellation of the essential land sale. In 2023, Ritaluoma received a custodial sentence of two years and six months for multiple counts of aggravated fraud, aggravated debtor dishonesty, and aggravated tax offences. Today, only the advertising tower's base - an estimated €25,000 investment - remains as a tangible testament to the venture. The affair brought considerable embarrassment to the city and raised questions of corruption in Finland.

=== MORE Industrial Park ===
The MORE business area is a joint project of Hämeenlinna and Janakkala. The municipalities aim to expand the area to 1,000 hectares in size. In 2024, MORE had about 150 companies and around 1,500 employees. A doctoral dissertation at the University of Vaasa states that the best locations for logistics in the Nordic countries are Oslo in Norway, Stockholm in Sweden, and Hämeenlinna in Finland. Hämeenlinna is located within an hour's drive from Helsinki, Turku, and Tampere. Major ports and airports are nearby. MORE cooperates with Häme University of Applied Sciences and the Tavastia Education Consortium to ensure the availability of labor.

== Education ==
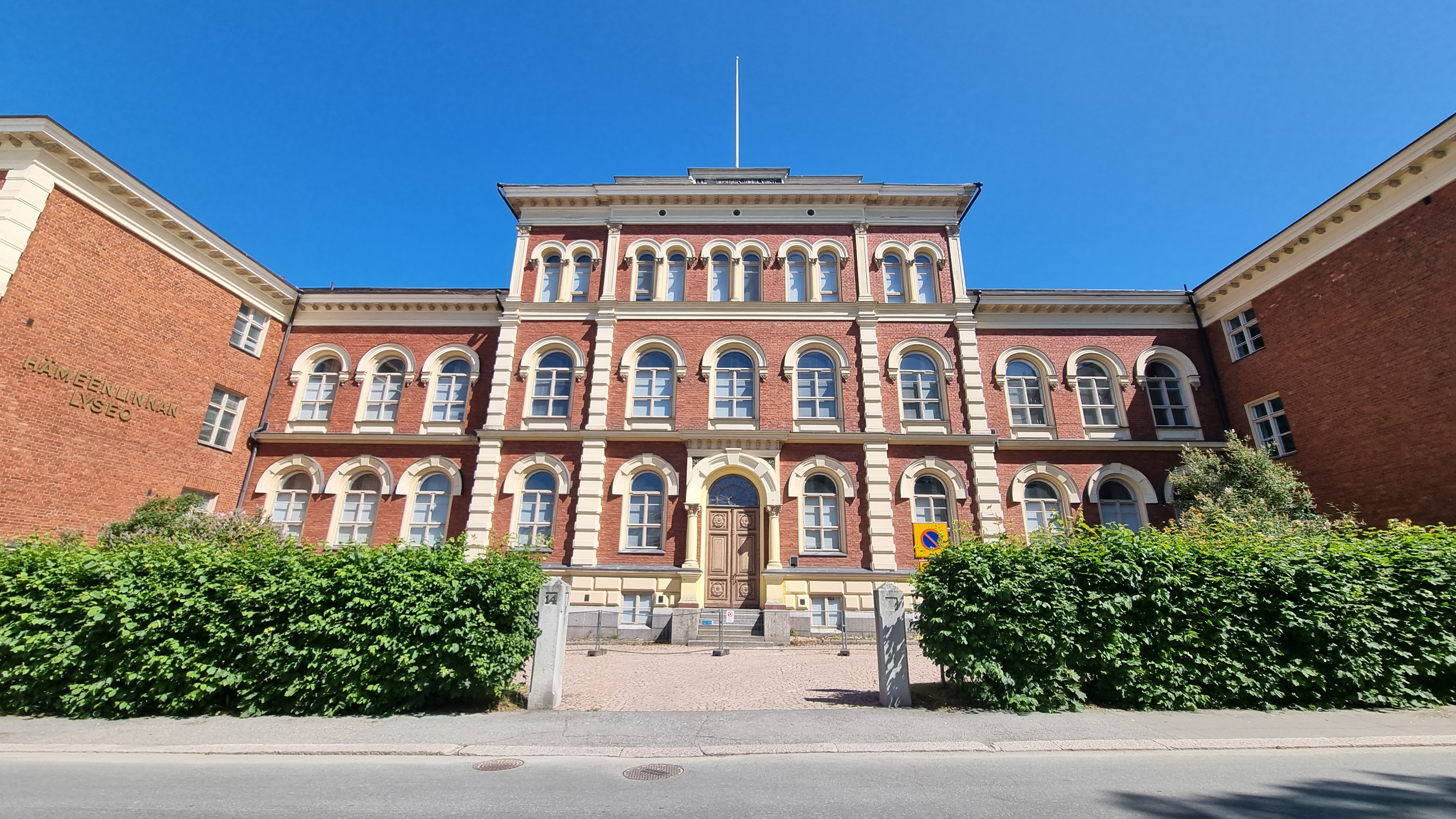
The Hämeenlinna Lyceum was founded in 1873.

Hämeenlinna is home to HAMK Häme University of Applied Sciences' headquarters. Founded in 1873, Hämeenlinna Lyceum has many cultural influencers. The school is one of the most famous educational institutions in Finland, as many well-known Finns have graduated from the institution; examples include master composer Jean Sibelius and president Juho Kusti Paasikivi. Hämeenlinna Lyceum has a middle school (grades 7–9) and a high school. Another of the high schools in Hämeenlinna's inner city is Kauriala High School. Hämeenlinna's Lyceum and Kauriala High School were to be combined in the fall of 2018 to form a large high school with more than a thousand students on the Hattelmala campus of the Tavastia Education Consortium. However, the city council decided to cancel the high school project in the spring of 2018, and the high schools will continue to be separate.

== Culture ==
=== Museums ===
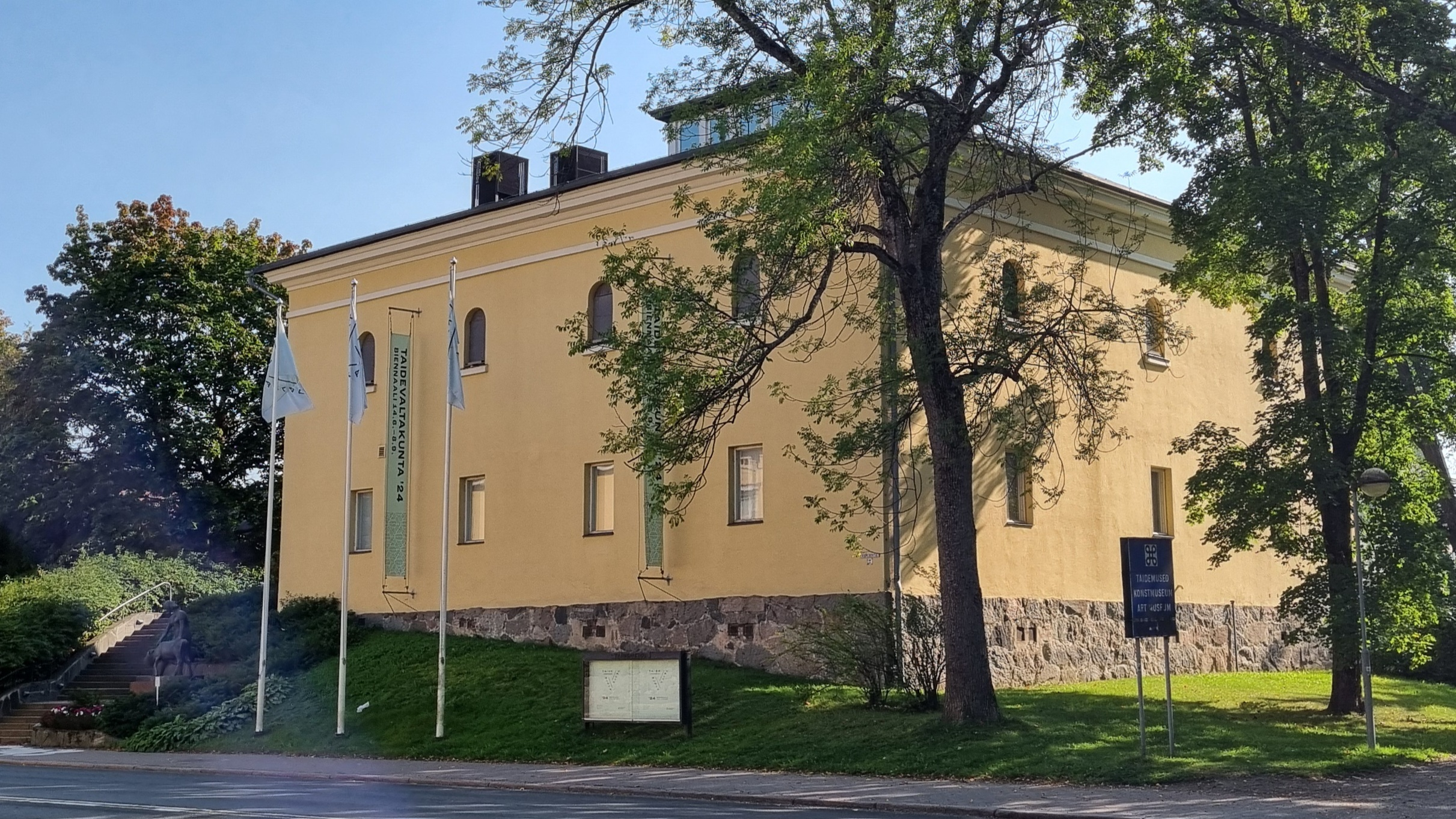
Hämeenlinna Art Museum. Former Crown Warehouse designed by Carl Ludvig Engel.

Hämeenlinna is home to a diverse range of museums, including Häme Castle, Hämeenlinna Art Museum, Iittala Glass Museum, Prison Museum, Skogster Museum (Hämeenlinna City Museum), Birthplace of Jean Sibelius, and Artillery, Engineer and Signals Museum of Finland (Militaria Museum).

=== Verkatehdas - Cultural and Conference Center ===
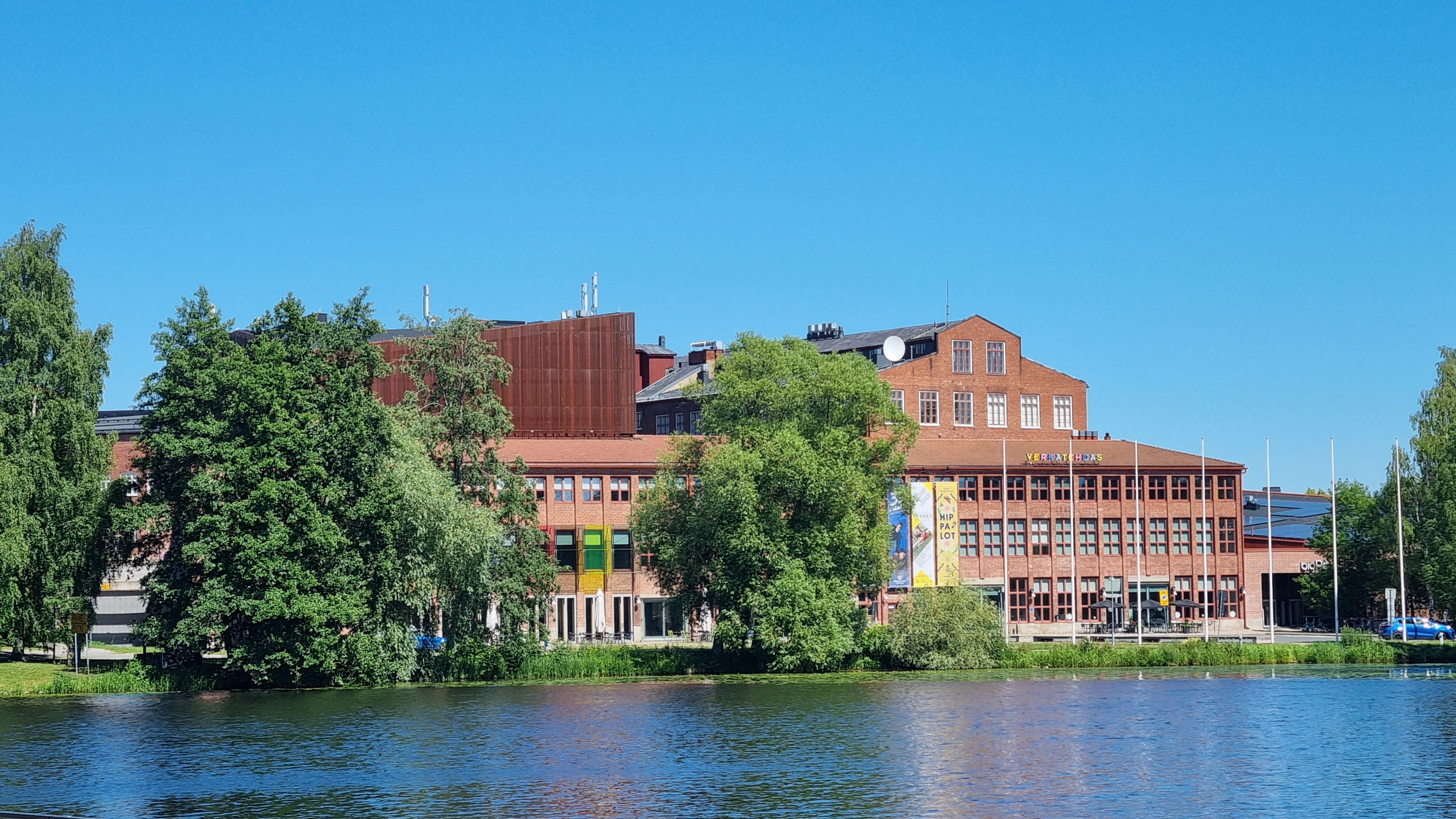
Verkatehdas in Hämeenlinna.

Verkatehdas is a well-known cultural and conference center situated in Hämeenlinna, Finland. Originally a textile factory, it has been repurposed into a venue that hosts a wide range of events and activities.

BioRex Verkatehdas is a modern cinema located within the complex, featuring five screening rooms equipped with advanced technology, including 4K laser projectors and Xpandin 3D capabilities.

Hämeenlinna Art Museum is situated in the Verkatehdas area, it showcases Finnish and international visual art. It boasts a collection of over 8,000 works and frequently hosts temporary exhibitions.

=== Gastronomy ===
Hämeenlinna has seen a growing number of restaurants in recent years and is becoming a gastronomical destination in Finland.

In the 1980s, the following dishes were named Hämeenlinna's traditional cuisine: as a daily meal, smoked ham and sourdough bread; as a festive meal, the herring wrapped in rye dough or kalaleipä, i.e. "fish bread", buttermilk and beer, and the riistansylttääjän lintupaisti, which is pheasant stuffed with almonds, potato and apple slices.

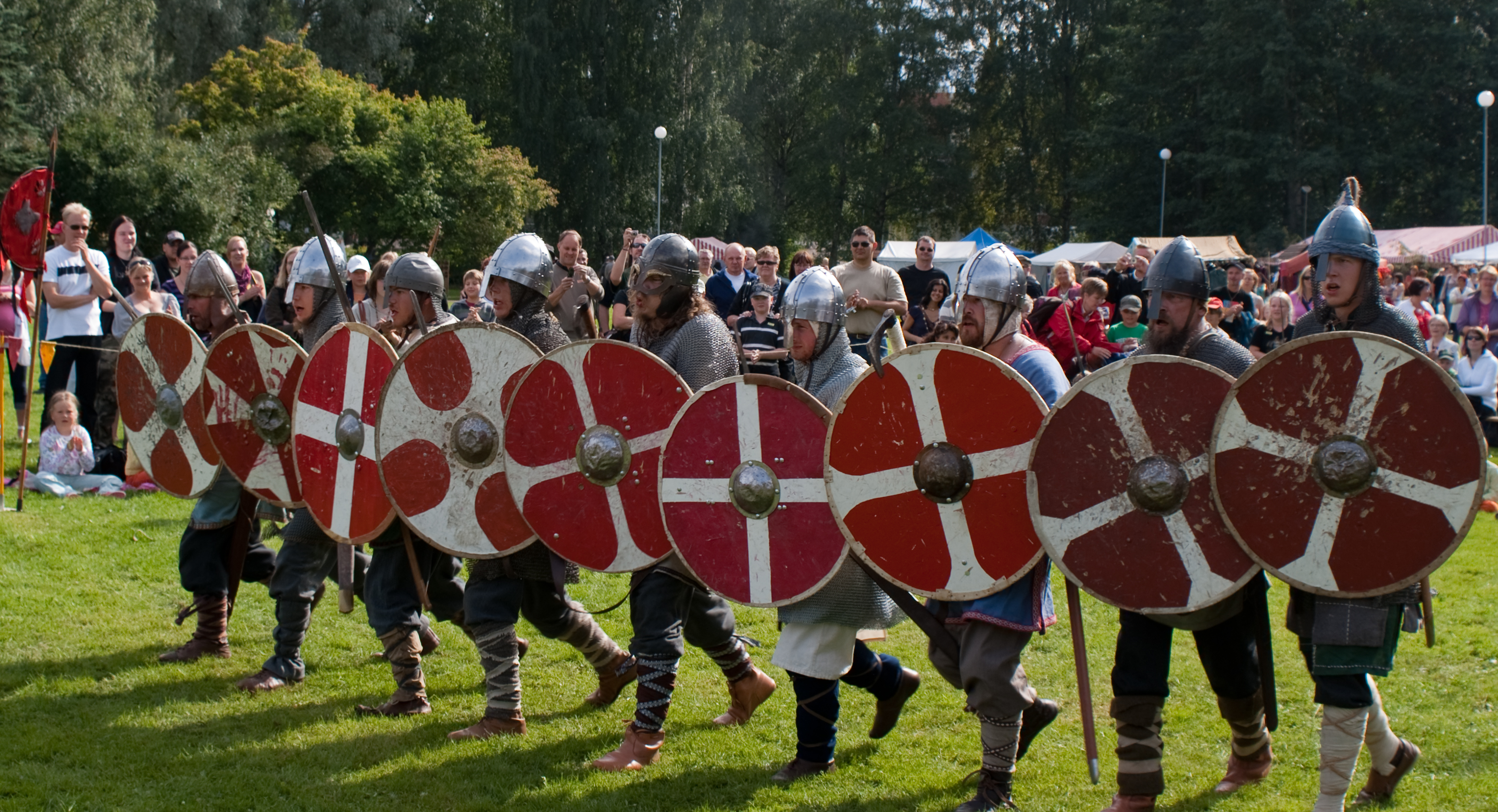
Häme Medieval Festival.

=== Festivals ===
- Wanaja Festival is annual music festival held in Linnanpuisto, this event has grown in popularity, showcasing both local and international artists. It attracts large crowds each summer, emphasizing Hämeenlinna's vibrant music scene.
- Häme Medieval Festival celebrates medieval culture with activities, performances, and markets. It has become a staple event in August, drawing visitors interested in history and reenactments.

=== Sport ===
- Elite level ice hockey teams HPK of the SM-liiga and HPK Kiekkonaiset of the Naisten Liiga
- Football team Hämeenlinnan Jalkapalloseura plays in the third-tier Kakkonen, and the women's representative team of Hämeenlinnan Jalkapalloseura plays in the Naisten Kakkonen.
- The city hosted the modern pentathlon competition for the 1952 Summer Olympics in Helsinki. Athletes stayed in a local hotel.
- Hämeenlinna hosted the first round of the Underwater Rugby Euroleague in October 2012 and again in 2015.
- The Ahvenisto Race Circuit, opened in 1967, hosts many motorsport happenings. The following racing legends have competed on the circuit: Jim Clark, Graham Hill, Jack Brabham, and Niki Lauda. Track has an FIA Grade 4 license.
- Steelers Sailbandy (Floorball) Club which play in the F-liiga.
- Hämeenlinna is the home of Linna Golf, Finland's only PGA European Tour-level golf course, where several prestigious competitions have been played. The course is located in connection with Vanajanlinna Manor.

== Notable natives or residents ==
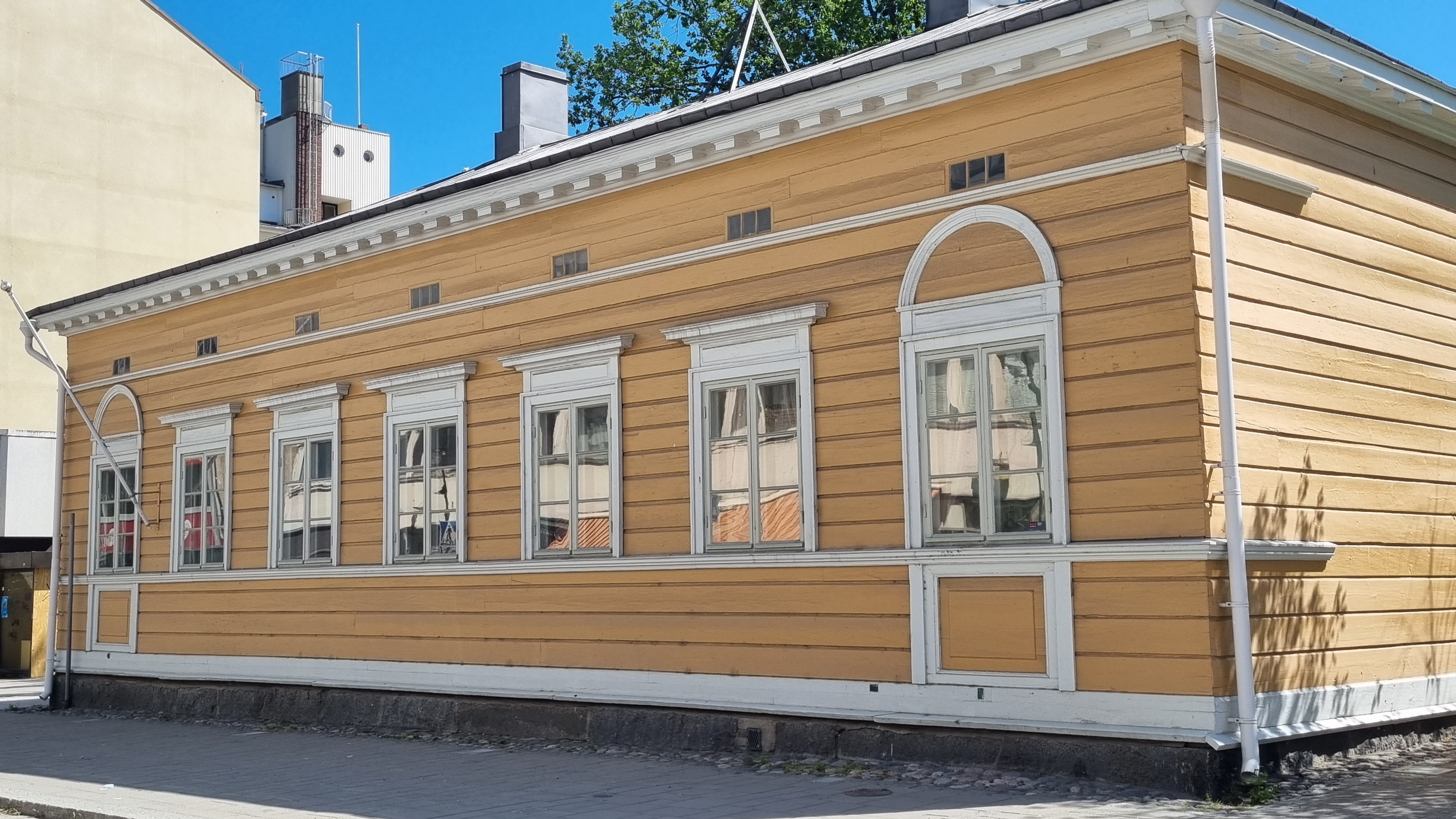
The birthplace of composer Jean Sibelius in Hämeenlinna.

- Jouko Ahola (strongman/actor)
- Arthur af Forselles (politician)
- Sigrid af Forselles (sculptor)
- Kaarlo Heiskanen (general)
- Kari Heiskanen (actor)
- Helge Herala (actor)
- Antony Hämäläinen (vocalist)
- Jari Koskinen (minister)
- Johannes Koskinen (minister)
- Eino Leino (poet)
- Elias Lönnrot (author of Kalevala)
- Marko Mäkilaakso (music video and film director)
- Antti Miettinen (NHL player); won a bronze medal with Finland in the 2010 Vancouver Olympics
- Victorine Nordenswan (painter)
- Antti Nurmesniemi (designer)
- Johan Wilhelm Rangell (Prime Minister)
- J. K. Paasikivi (7th President of Finland)
- Kimi Räikkönen (Formula One driver) and Jenni Dahlman (married at Vanajanlinna Manor in 2004)
- Carl Wilhelm Rosenlew (business magnate and owner of Vanajanlinna Manor)
- Juuse Saros (NHL goaltender)
- Jean Sibelius (composer)
- Hugo Robert Standertskjöld (business magnate and owner of Aulanko)
- Antero Svensson (general)
- Väinö Tanner (geographer)
- Turisas (metal band)
- Fredrika Wetterhoff (teacher and founder of Wetterhoff Craft School)

== International relations ==
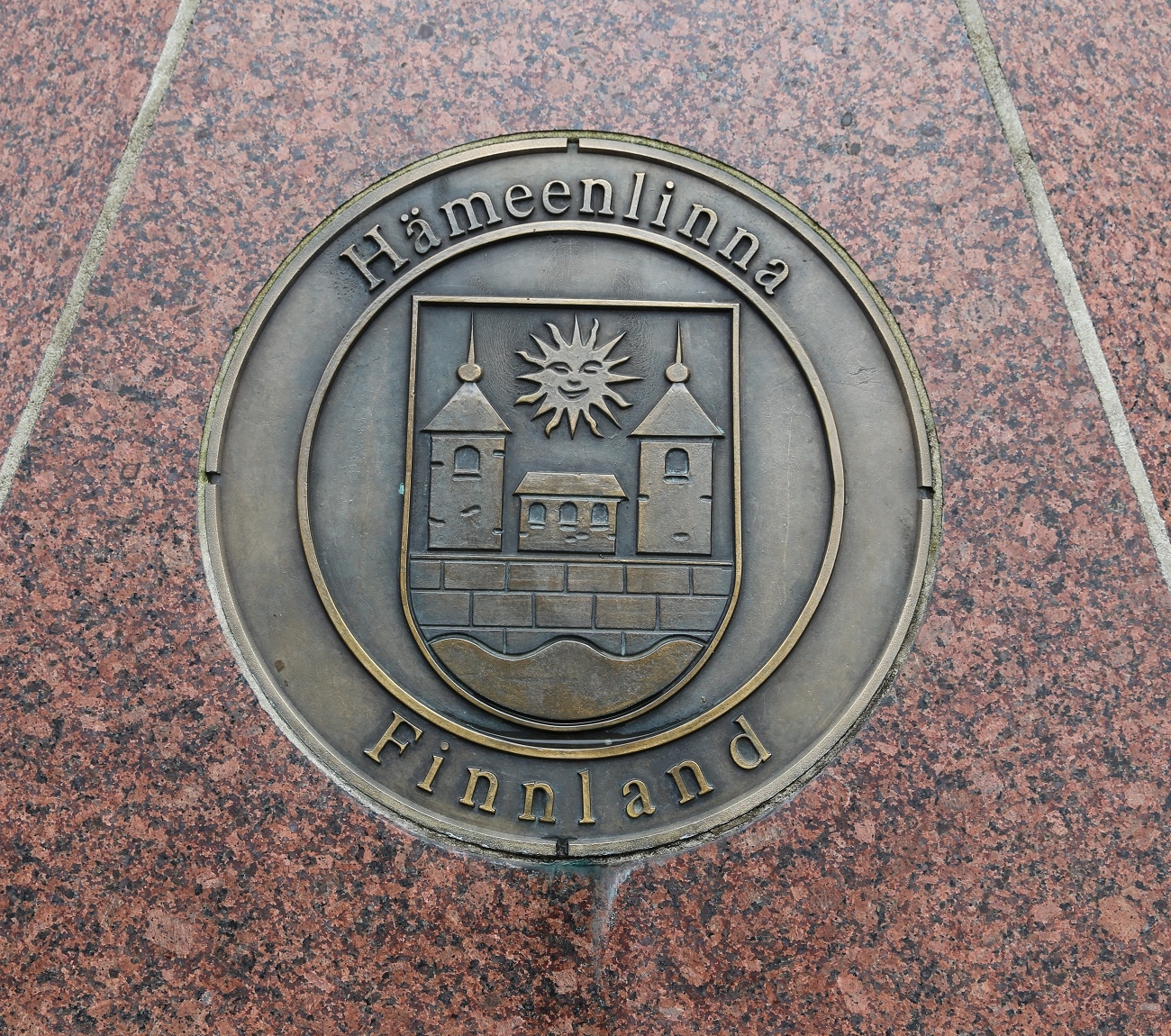
Commemorative plaque of Hämeenlinna in Celle, Germany.

=== Twin towns – Sister cities ===
Hämeenlinna is twinned with:

Bærum, Norway; Celle, Germany; Frederiksberg, Denmark; Hafnarfjörður, Iceland; Tver, Russia; Püspökladány, Hungary	Toruń, Poland; Uppsala, Sweden; Weimar, Germany; Tartu, Estonia (partnership); Lucca, Italy

== See also ==
- Aulanko
- Finnish national road 3
- Hämeen Sanomat
- Parola (Hattula)
- Häme Castle
- Lake Vanajavesi
- Lion of Parola
- Parola Tank Museum
- Vanajanlinna Manor
