= Häme University of Applied Sciences =

Institute of higher education in Finland

Häme University of Applied Sciences (HAMK)
- Hämeen ammattikorkeakoulu
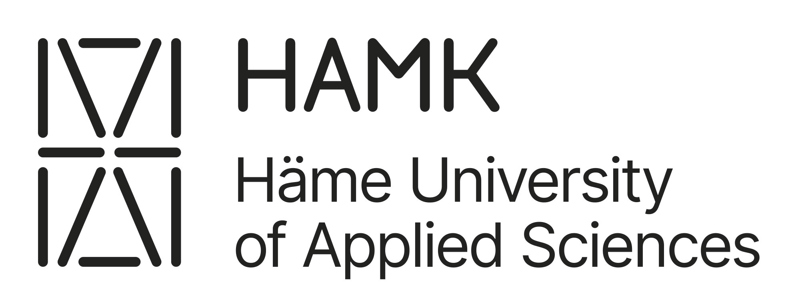
- HAMK Logo
- Type: University of applied sciences
- Rector: Pertti Puusaari
- Students: 10 000
- Location: Evo, Forssa, Hämeenlinna, Lepaa, Riihimäki, Mustiala, Valkeakoski, Finland
- Website: www.hamk.fi

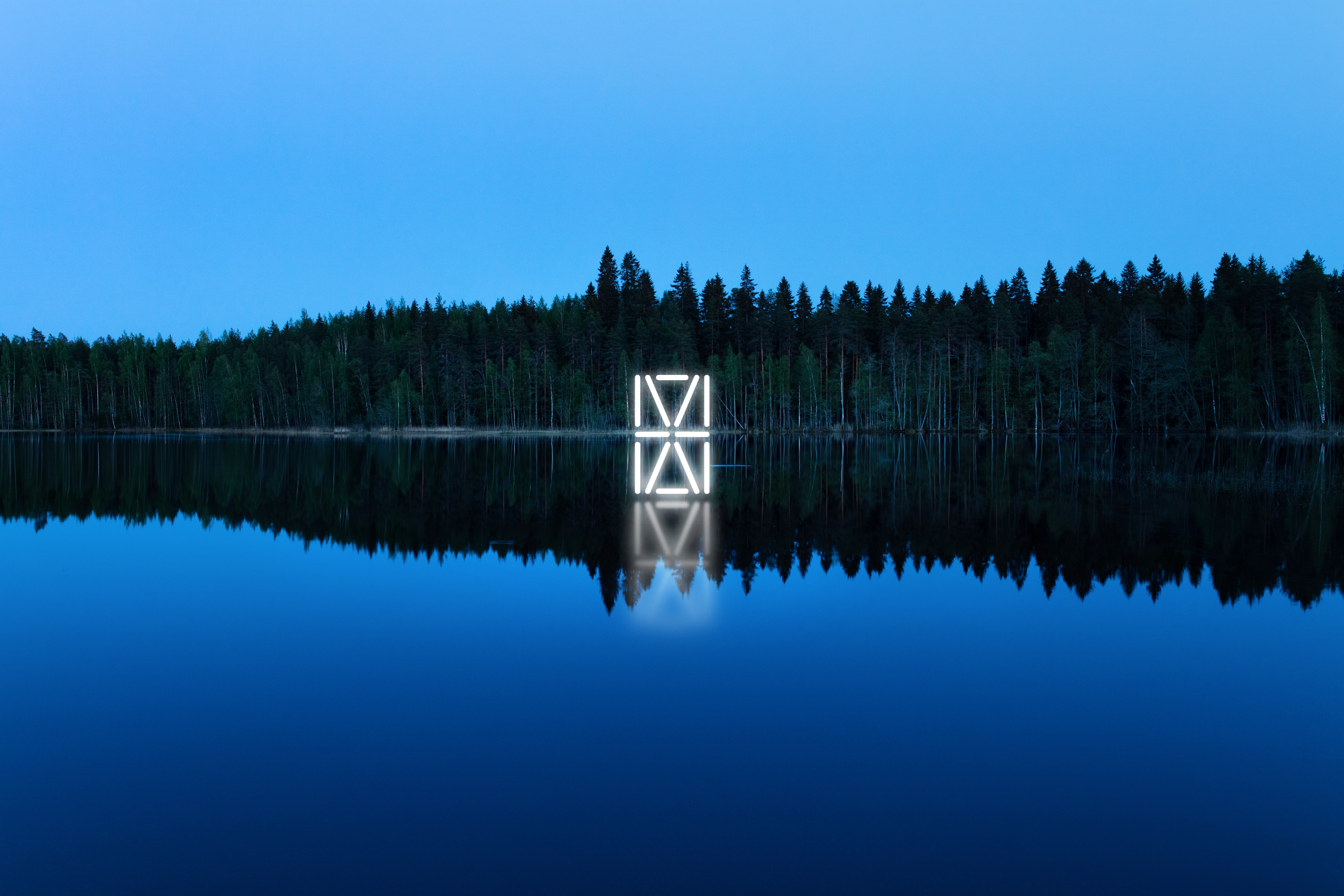

Häme University of Applied Sciences (HAMK, Finnish: Hämeen ammattikorkeakoulu) is a multidisciplinary university of applied sciences that operates in the regions of Kanta-Häme and Pirkanmaa and also offers online studies. HAMK offers several dozen bachelor's degree programmes and several master's degree programmes (YAMK) in the fields of bioeconomy, business, design, education, health and technology. HAMK also offers education in English.

HAMK operates at seven locations, based in southern Finland: Evo, Forssa, Hämeenlinna, Hattula (Lepaa), Mustiala, Riihimäki and Valkeakoski. There are approximately 10,000 students and 800 staff members.

HAMK has a wide network of partners. In Finland, HAMK's strategic partners include Aalto University, Luke Natural Resources Institute, Laurea University of Applied Sciences, XAMK University of Applied Sciences of South-East Finland and Humak University of Applied Sciences. HAMK is also a member of the RUN -Europe University together with seven other European universities and the Beyond alliance between HAMK and Feevale University in Brazil.

== Research, development and innovation ==
In addition to education, HAMK offers research, development and innovation services, with a focus on raw material production, the circular economy, sustainable construction and the built environment, and future skills and education. Around these themes, HAMK forms three research ecosystems: SmartBio, SmartBuilt and SmartEdu.

Research activities promote regional impact and business-oriented research, as well as support teaching.

Participation in research, development and innovation (RDI) is an integral part of studying at HAMK. Local businesses, especially SMEs and the public sector, work together with HAMK on research or development, as part of which learning is organised at HAMK. In addition to various project and research services, HAMK experts carry out direct assignments for companies and public actors. The close interaction with working life serves both the growth of students into professional expert positions and the development of business and communities.
