= Vojakkala (Loppi) =

Village in Loppi, Finland

Coordinates: 60°46′43″N 24°09′05″E

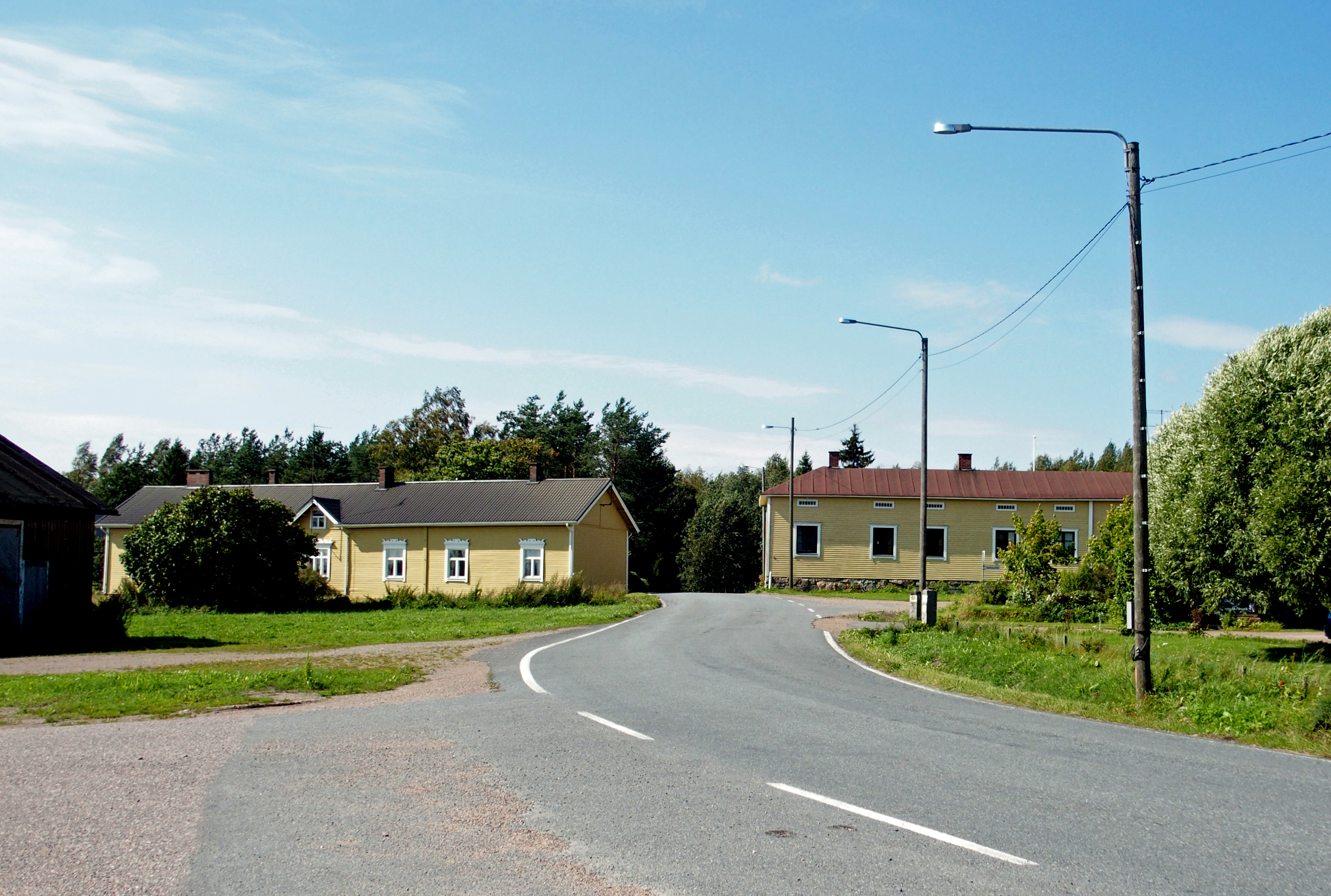
Vojakkala village.

Vojakkala is a village on the western edge of the municipality of Loppi in Kanta-Häme, Finland, near main road between Tammela ja Hollola. The nearest large villages are Loppi Church Village and Renko, about 20 km (12 mi) away. The distance to Tammela is about 30 km, to the nearest towns Forssa, Hämeenlinna and Riihimäki about 35 km (22 mi).

Vojakkala has probably been inhabited since the 13th century and is one of Loppi's oldest villages. The buildings at Vojakkala are intersected at the crossroads. The old village plot has the financial centers of the Kallela, Lukana and Siukola farms. The main buildings of the premises were built or expanded to their present size by the beginning of the 20th century. In the late 19th century, Kallela was a hostelry. The village and its oldest fields are bordered in the south by Lake Kaartjärvi and the rest of the forest. Together with the village of Topeno, Vojakkala is a nationally built cultural environment of Finland.

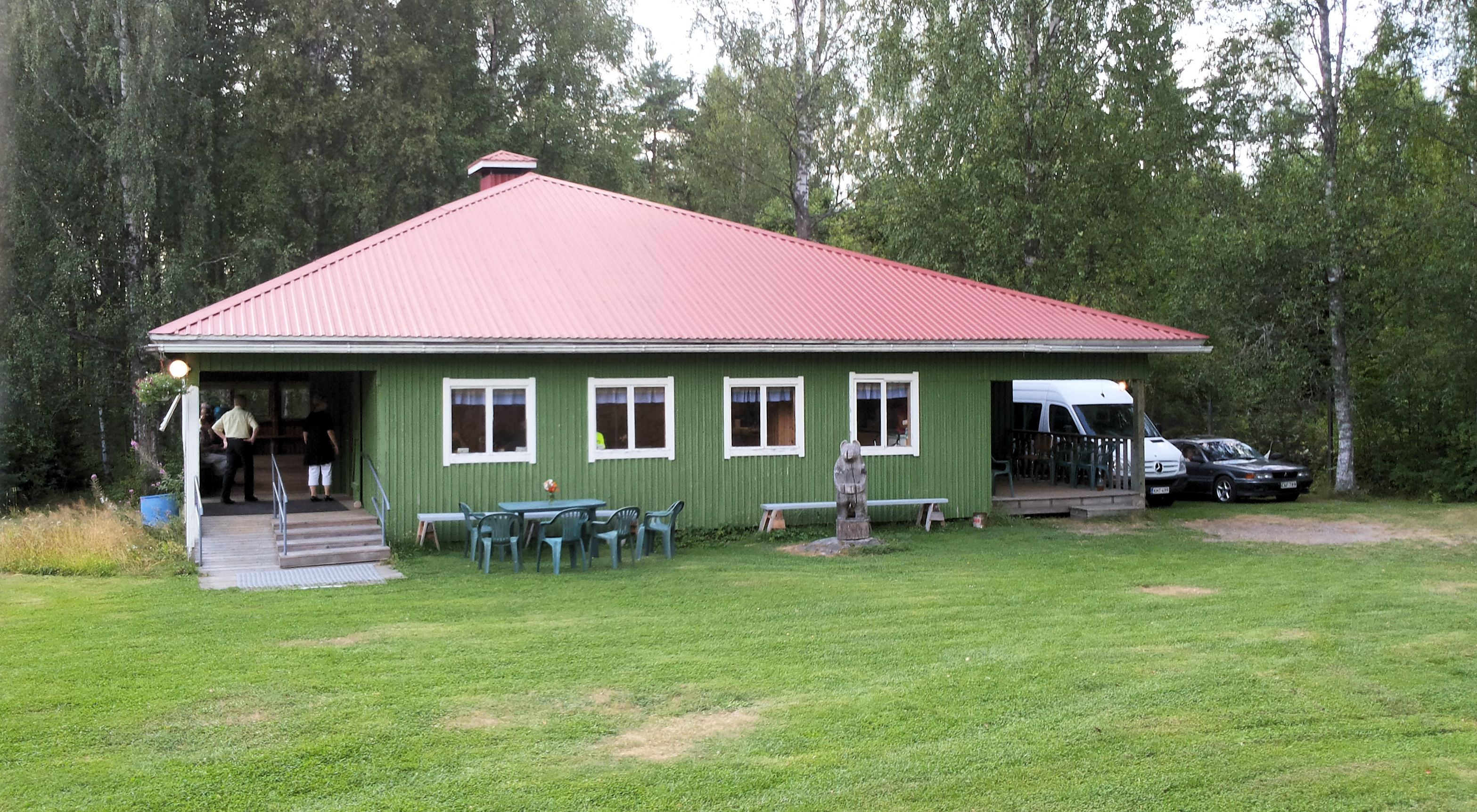
A dance hall in Vojakkala.

With the holiday season, Vojakkala's population will multiply in the summer. On summer Saturdays there are stage dances in the village. The villages of the village center have the opportunity to join the water supply network. There was a two-teacher school in Vojakkala and a group family day care. The school and day care center were closed in 2010. The local school in the area is now the Länsi-Lopen koulu in Topeno.

The associations operating in Vojakkala are the village association Vojakkalalaiset ry, the sports club Vojakkalan Valpas, the Guard Society of Kaartjärvi, Pääjärven suojely ry and the Vojakkala's Agricultural and Housing Association. The people of Vojakkala are formerly known as the Village Council of Vojakkala. The committee was established in 1980. In 1996 the association was elected as the most active village association in Kanta-Häme. The Village Association has been publishing Vojakkalan Viesti magazine six times a year since 1998. The village association organizes gatherings and summer parties, takes care of the village beach and organizes roadside cleaning workshops. Vojakkalan Valpas was founded in 1948. In addition to sporting activities, the association engages in general village activities. It maintains the Vojakkala stage and arranges the village dances. In 2014, Vojakkala was named the Village of the Year of Kanta-Häme.

== See also ==
- Finnish national road 54
- Topeno
