= Finnish regional road 132 =

Road in Finland

Regional Road 132
- Yhdystie 132 (Finnish); Förbindelseväg 132 (Swedish)
- Loppi Road: Lopentie; Loppisvägen
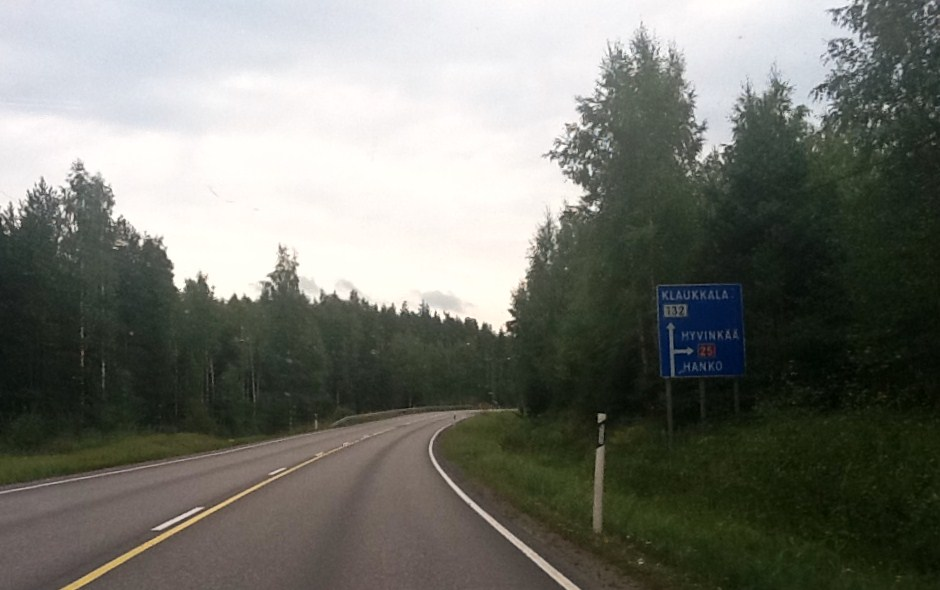

Route information
- Length: 52 km (32 mi)

Major junctions
- From: Vantaa
- To: Loppi

Location
- Country: Finland

Highway system
- Highways in Finland

Finnish regional road 132 (Finnish: Seututie 132, Swedish: Regionalväg 132), or Loppi Road (Finnish: Lopentie, Swedish: Loppisvägen), is the road between Highway 3 (E12) and Highway 54, which starts at the southern end from the border of Vantaa and Nurmijärvi and at the northern end starts in the municipality of Loppi, right next to the church village of Loppi. The road is paved, dual lane and 52 kilometers (32 mi) long. Back in the late 1950s, it was the original main road before the current freeway, and in addition to passing through Loppi, it continued through the remote forest areas of Janakkala all the way to Hämeenlinna. And before the completion of the current Finnish national road 2, it also served the traffic of Forssa and Pori, which passed through Loppi and Tammela.

In November 2020, a new road alignment was completed on the road around the northern part of Nurmijärvi's Klaukkala, before which the old alignment passed through the center of Klaukkala. The new bypass is known as the Klaukkala Ring Road (Finnish: Klaukkalan kehätie).

== Route ==
- Vantaa
- Nurmijärvi
  - Klaukkala
  - Perttula
  - Röykkä
- Vihti
  - Vihtijärvi
- Loppi
  - Läyliäinen
  - Loppi

== See also ==
- Vihdintie
- Ring IV
