= Loppijärvi =

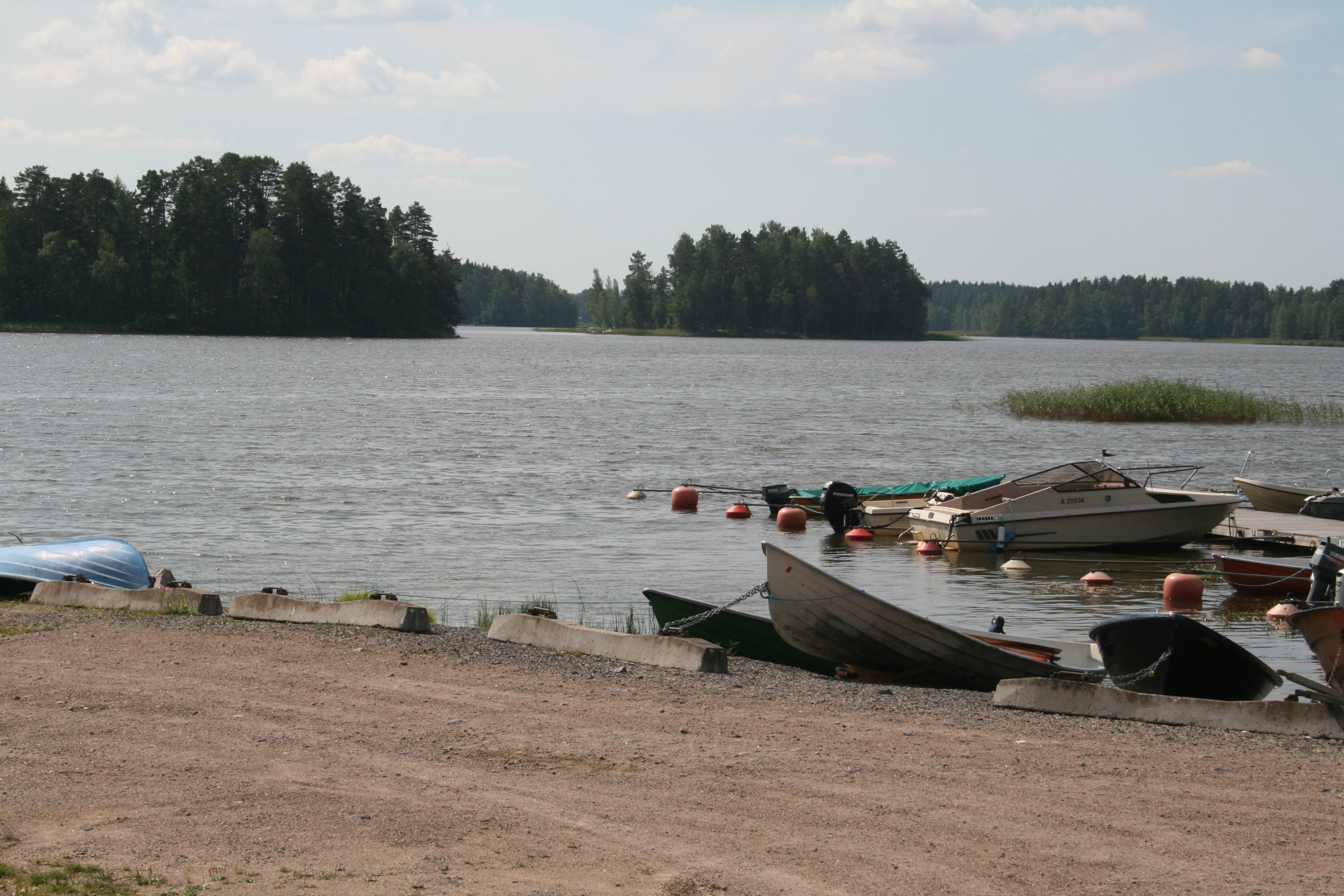

- Location within Finland
- Location: Loppi, Finland
- Coordinates: 60°41′N 024°26′E
- Lake type: Lake
- Primary outflows: Tervajoki river
- Catchment area: Kokemäenjoki
- Basin countries: Finland
- Surface area: 11.8 km^{2} (4.6 sq mi)
- Average depth: 1.75 m (5.7 ft)
- Max. depth: 6.71 m (22.0 ft)
- Water volume: 0.0207 km^{3} (16,800 acre⋅ft)
- Residence time: 0.910 years
- Shore length^{1}: 46 km (29 mi)
- Frozen: December–April
- Islands: 25
- ^{1} Shore length is not a well-defined measure.

Loppijärvi is a medium-sized lake in Finland. It is situated in the municipality of Loppi in the Kanta-Häme region. The lake is part of Kokemäki River basin and it drains through Tervajoki River into Lake Kernaalanjärvi which in its turn drains into Lake Vanajavesi through Hiidenjoki River. On the north shore of the lake is Kirkonkylä, the administrative center of the Loppi, and on the south shore the village of Läyliäinen.

== See also ==
- List of lakes in Finland
