= Loppi Old Church =

- St. Bridget Church
- Finnish: Lopen vanha kirkko Santa Pirjon kirkko Swedish: Loppis gamla kyrka Sankta Birgittakyrkan
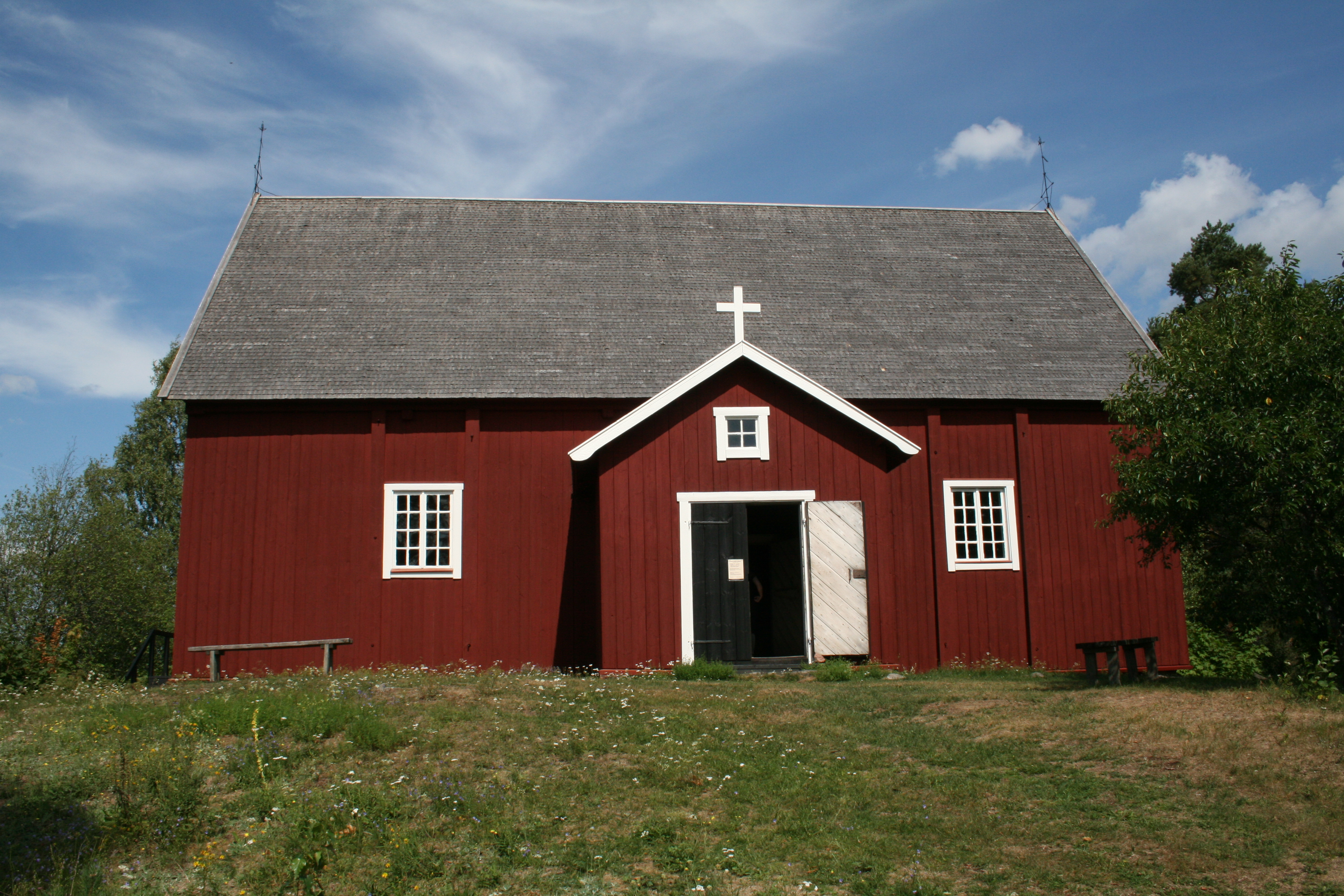
- Loppi Old Church
- 60°42′35.64″N 24°25′48.65″E
- Location: Loppi
- Country: Finland
- Website: www.lopenseurakunta.fi/vanha-kirkko

History
- Dedication: Bridget of Sweden

Architecture
- Completed: c. 1660s

Administration
- Diocese: Tampere
- Parish: Loppi

The Loppi Old Church (Finnish: Lopen vanha kirkko; Swedish: Loppis gamla kyrka), also known as St. Bridget Church (Finnish: Santa Pirjon kirkko; Swedish: Sankta Birgittakyrkan), is the 17th-century wooden church located in the Loppi municipality in Kanta-Häme, Finland. The church was named after the Swedish patron saint Saint Bridget. The type of the church is a long church without a tower, and its interior is covered by a plate barrel vault.

The exact age of the church is not known for sure, as the documents that probably state its age were destroyed in the fire of the newer church. It has been speculated that it could have been built as early as the turn of the 15th and 16th centuries. However, 1665 and 1666 have been determined as the last growth period of its wall logs, based on which the church's estimated completion date has been determined.

According to local folklore, Kaakkomäki of Loppi was inhabited by a giant devil in ancient times. When the old church was built, the devil tried to disrupt the construction and became enraged when the church bells rang. The devil tried to destroy the church bell tower and threw it with a large rock. However, the rock flew over the church to Tiirinkallio on the shore of Lake Loppijärvi, from where the rock was combed into the lake.

The old church hill, where the church is located, belongs to the nationally significant built cultural environments defined by the Finnish Heritage Agency. On the church hill there is, among other things, the grave monument of the Finnish archaeologist and explorer Sakari Pälsi (1882–1965).

== Sources ==
=== Further reading ===
- Haapio, Markku; Luostarinen, Laura (1980). Suomen kirkot ja kirkkotaide (in Finnish). Vol. 2. Lieto: Etelä-Suomen kustannus. ISBN 9519064281.
