= Läyliäinen =

- Village
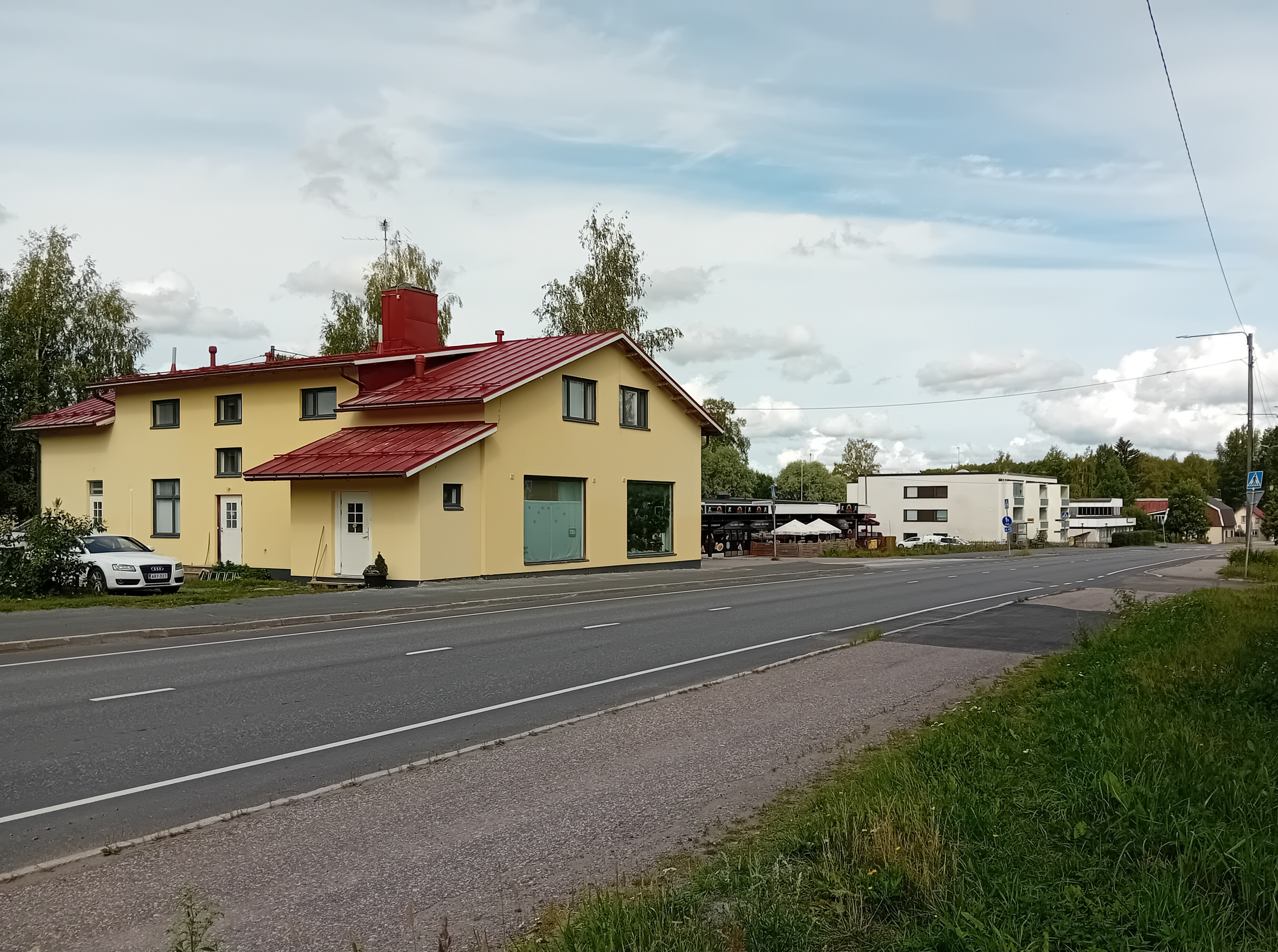
- The centre of Läyliäinen

- Location in Finland
- Coordinates: 60°37.565′N 24°27.639′E
- Country: Finland
- Region: Kanta-Häme
- Municipality: Loppi

Area
  - Urban: 312 km^{2} (120 sq mi)

Population (2017-12-31)
  - Village: 872
  - Density: 2,799/km^{2} (7,250/sq mi)
- Time zone: UTC+2 (EET)
  - Summer (DST): UTC+3 (EEST)
- Postal code: 12600

Läyliäinen (Finnish pronunciation: [ˈlæy̯liˌæi̯nen]) is a village in the southern part of the Loppi municipality in Kanta-Häme, Finland. The village's population is less than 900. The village is crossed by the Finnish regional road 132 (Mt 132) that runs between the Loppi church village and Klaukkala.

The center of the village was formerly known as Talvio. At that time, the center was about one kilometer from the present center of the village towards Helsinki, around Soltinmutka. With the Hyvinkää–Karkkila railway built in 1912, the center of the village moved to its current location. The old station depot and water booth still remind the people of Läyliäinen the history of the village, even though the course was dismantled in 1967. The name Talvio was removed from the addresses and the whole area was renamed Läyliäinen.

The village lived its golden age in the 1950s, absorbing the railroad. There were over 1,500 inhabitants and there were two banks, four shops, a dairy, a furniture and leather factory, a movie theater and a guesthouse. But with the dismantling of the railway and the completion of the new Finnish national road 3 between Helsinki and Hämeenlinna in the 1960s, the population of the Läyliäinen began to decline and services shrank. Over the years, Läyliäinen has gained a reputation as a "sleeping suburb along the way". On the bypass along Klaukkala, the southernmost village of Nurmijärvi, the municipality of Loppi has set high expectations for a new boom in the village's population.

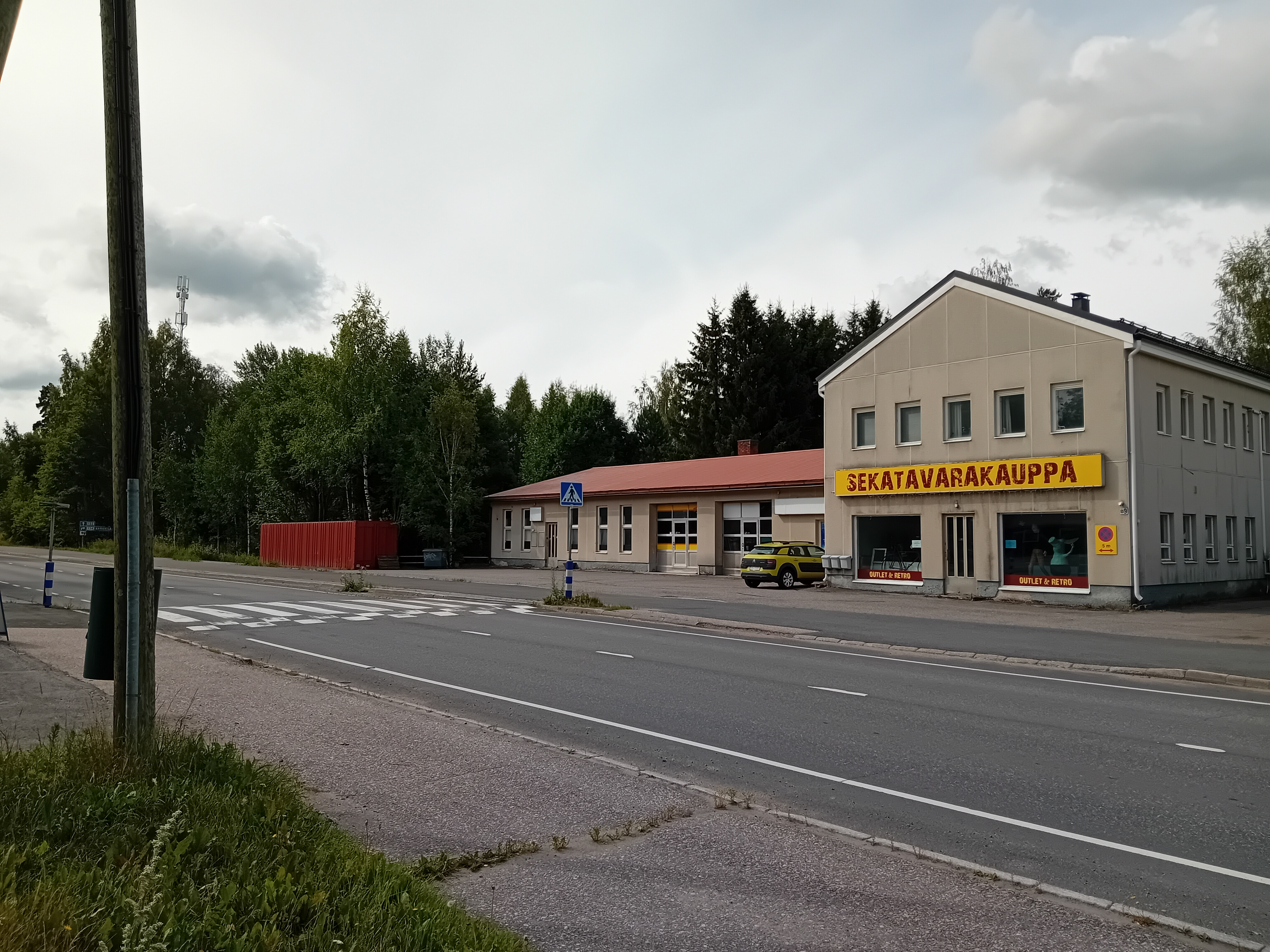
A general store in Läyliäinen

Today, Läyliäinen has one Sale grocery store, a hardware and agricultural store, two bars (Bar Barooni and Ketunkolo) which also serves lunch and barbecue, a post office, one florist's shop, a craft shop, a primary school, a nursery and Neste's gas station with a Rolls hamburger restaurant, a hairdressing salon, a physical grooming service and a taxi. Upper school, high school, pharmacy, health center and Alko are approximately 12 kilometers away in the church village of Loppi. In early 2018, the pharmacy's remote service point will also operate at another grocery store. You can order prescription drugs at a remote point and buy, for example, first aid kits.

There is also a forest processing unit of the Forest Research Institute. Until 2000, it was the seat of the Forest Processing Foundation and a breeding establishment. The site has a special breeding park for domestic species of wood.

== Distances from other cities ==
- Karkkila 20 km
- Hyvinkää 25 km
- Riihimäki 30 km
- Hämeenlinna 60 km
- Helsinki 60 km

== See also ==
- Kytäjä
- Pilpala
- Vihtijärvi

== Sources ==
- Kallenautio, Jorma (1976). Lopen historia kunnallisen itsehallinnon aikana. Lopen kunta, seurakunta ja manttaalikunta. ISBN 951-99093-5-4.
- Alhainen, Aatos (1999). Wanhan waltatien warrelta – kyläkirja Lopen kunnan Läyliäisistä. Läyliäisten kylätoimikunta. ISBN 952-91-1317-X.
