= Finnish Forest Research Institute =

Coordinates: 60°17′27″N 25°3′19″E

Finnish Forest Research Institute Metsäntutkimuslaitos
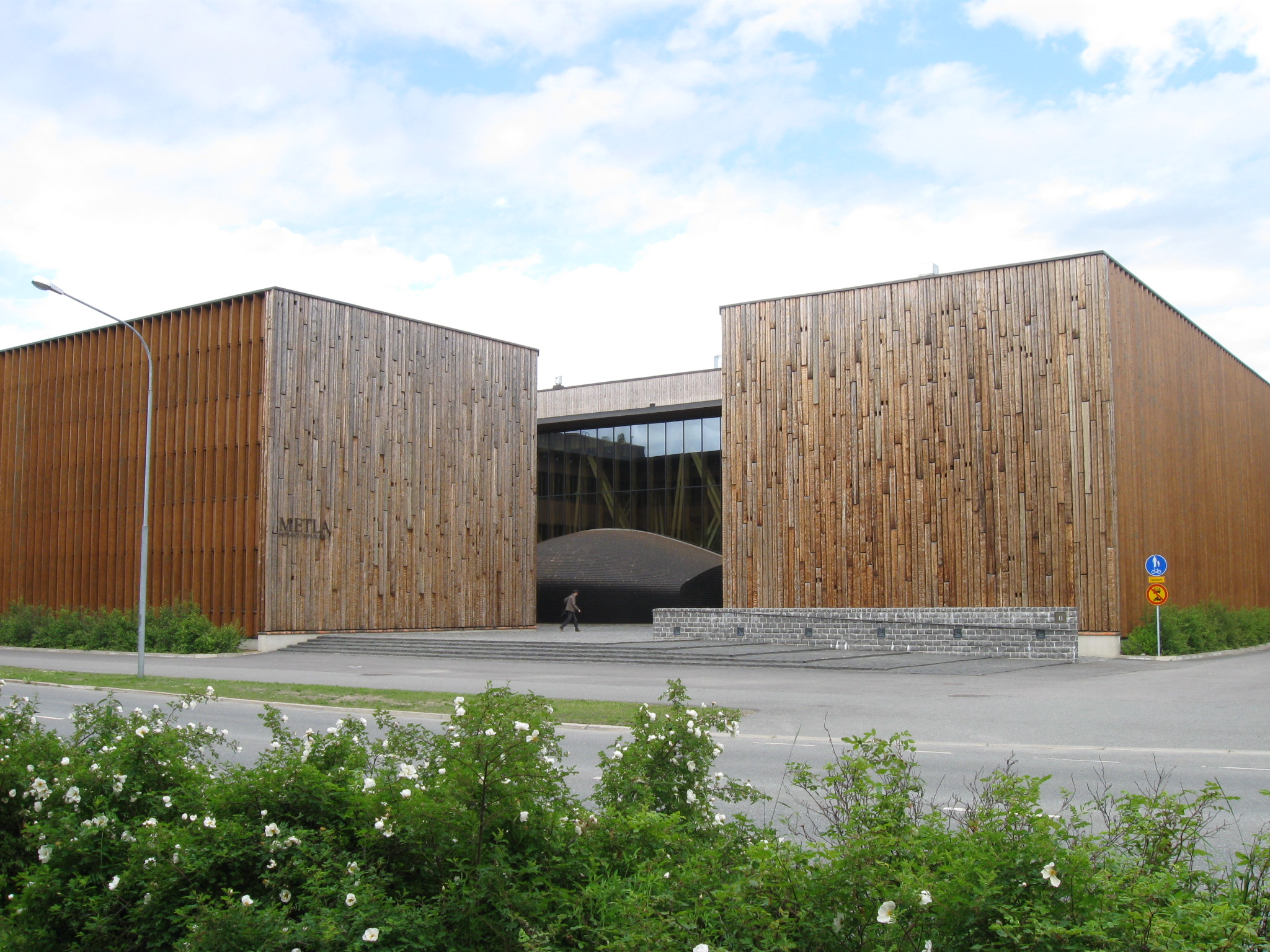
- Finnish Forest Research Institute (Metla)
- Interactive map of Finnish Forest Research Institute

The Finnish Forest Research Institute (Finnish: Metsäntutkimuslaitos, Swedish: Skogsforskningsinstitutet), known as Metla, is a subordinate agency to the Ministry of Agriculture and Forestry of the Government of Finland. It has statutory duties to promote, through research, the economical, ecological, and socially sustainable management and use of forests. Metla is one of Europe's largest forestry research institutes, with an annual budget of around €40 million and its regional network comprises 9 main research units across the country (in Joensuu, Kannus, Kolari, Loppi's Läyliäinen, Parkano, Savonlinna's Punkaharju, Rovaniemi, Suonenjoki and Vantaa). In addition, it has smaller offices in several municipalities.
