= Pilpala =

Village in Loppi, Finland

Coordinates: 60°37′32″N 24°16′43″E

Pilpala is a village in the Loppi municipality in Kanta-Häme, Finland. It is located in the southern part of the municipality, near the border of Karkkila town. It is less than 15 kilometers from the village to the church village of Loppi, Karkkila and the Läyliäinen village to the east. In the early 2010s, the population of the village was 200–300 inhabitants.

In the vicinity of Hyrrynmäki in Pilpala is the largest spring in Southern Finland, the two-hectare Hyrry Spring (Hyrryn lähde).

== Sources ==
- Suorsa, Salli (toim.): Kolmen kylän kirja. Elämää Pilpalan, Hunsalan ja Tevännön kylissä menneistä ajoista nykypäivään. Pilpalan kylät, 2005. ISBN 952-91-8789-0.
