= Loppi =

- Municipality
- Lopen kunta Loppi kommun
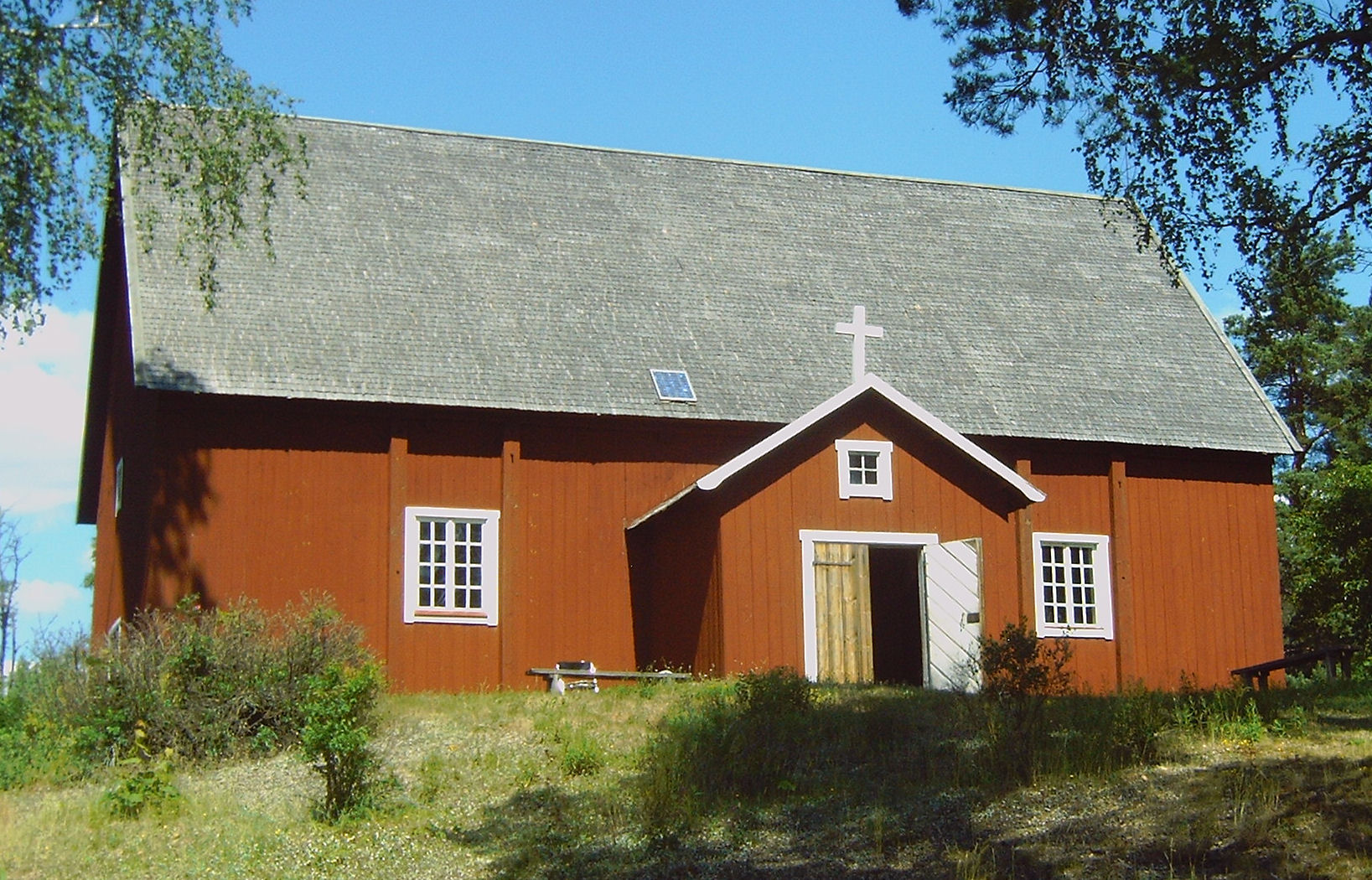
- Saint Bridget Church (Santa Pirjo)

- Coat of arms

- Location of Loppi in Finland
- Interactive map of Loppi
- Coordinates: 60°43′N 024°26.5′E
- Country: Finland
- Region: Kanta-Häme
- Sub-region: Riihimäki
- Founded: 1632
- Seat: Loppi (kirkonkylä)

Government
  - Municipal manager: Mikko Salmela

Area (2018-01-01)
  - Total: 655.97 km^{2} (253.27 sq mi)
  - Land: 597.69 km^{2} (230.77 sq mi)
  - Water: 58.36 km^{2} (22.53 sq mi)
  - Rank: 140th largest in Finland

Population (2025-12-31)
  - Total: 7,574
  - Rank: 123rd largest in Finland
  - Density: 12.67/km^{2} (32.8/sq mi)

Population by native language
  - Finnish: 95.5% (official)
  - Swedish: 0.5%
  - Others: 4.1%

Population by age
  - 0 to 14: 16%
  - 15 to 64: 58.1%
  - 65 or older: 25.9%
- Time zone: UTC+02:00 (EET)
  - Summer (DST): UTC+03:00 (EEST)
- Website: www.loppi.fi

Loppi (Finnish: [ˈlopːi]; Swedish: Loppi, also Loppis) is a municipality in Finland. It is part of the Kanta-Häme region, located about 50 kilometers (about 30 miles) south of the city of Hämeenlinna. Loppi was founded in 1632. The municipality has a population of 7,574 (31 December 2025) and covers an area of 655.97 square kilometres (253.27 sq mi) of which 58.36 km^{2} (22.53 sq mi) is water. The population density is 12.67 inhabitants per square kilometre (32.8/sq mi). The municipality is unilingually Finnish.

Neighbour municipalities are Hyvinkää, Hämeenlinna, Janakkala, Karkkila, Riihimäki, Tammela and Vihti. The most significant main road connection to get from Loppi to Riihimäki is the national road 54, which runs between Tammela and Hollola, and which is connected to the Highway 3 (E12) between Helsinki and Tampere. Another significant road connection in the direction of Helsinki is the regional road 132 passing through the municipality of Nurmijärvi.

The subject of the municipal coat of arms, where the iron symbol has sunk into a wave-cut plate, refers to the lifting of limonite from the lake in the early period.

According to local folklore, Kaakkomäki of Loppi was inhabited by a giant devil in ancient times. When Loppi's old church, Saint Bridget Church, was built in the 17th century, the devil tried to disrupt the construction and became enraged when the church bells rang. The devil tried to destroy the church bell tower and threw it with a large rock. However, the rock flew over the church to Tiirinkallio on the shore of Lake Loppijärvi, from where the rock was combed into the lake. The stone in the lake brought a disaster: cattle fell ill and animals died. So the villagers crammed the rock up the cliff and the luck of the cattle was restored.

Loppi is especially known for its potato cultivation, and the potato is classified as the municipality's title plant. Potato porridge and lingonberry broth cooked from barley flour, as well as a sweetened potato casserole and meat sauce, were named the traditional food of the Loppi parish in the 1980s.

== History ==
Loppi is part of a historic province of Tavastia. Originally it was part of the chapel parish of Janakkala. The Loppi Chapel Parish, formed in the 16th century, included only seven of the current Loppi villages: Läyliäinen, Sajaniemi, Joentaka, Loppi, Hunsala, Teväntö and Pilpala. Other villages belonged directly to Janakkala. The independent parish of Loppi became in 1632. This also included other villages that later belonged to Loppi and also Kytäjä, (now part of Hyvinkää), which had been part of Janakkala until 1579, then became part of Nurmijärvi, with the exception of Vatsia's house, which remained in connection with Loppi. The administrator of Loppi was much wider in its territory than the administrator of the church. When the Riihimäki township was founded in 1926, the Vatsia house in the village of Kytäjä was moved from Loppi to Riihimäki borough.

Between 1907 and 1954, there was a narrow-gauge railway connection between Riihimäki and Loppi, built by the industrialist H. G. Paloheimo. After the Second World War, Loppi was inhabited by just under 1,100 Karelian migrants. Most of them, nearly 900, were from Kamennogorsk parish.

== Geography ==
The forested highland of Tammela, which extends to the western part of Loppi, and the Salpausselkä, which cross the municipality's area, form a watershed between the Kokemäki River watershed to the north and the smaller river basins flowing to the south. The waterways descending to the north originate from Lake Kaartjärvi and Lake Loppi and join in Janakkala in Lake Kernaala. Lake Hirvijärvi flows into the Vantaa River watershed in the southeast on the border of Loppi, Riihimäki and Hyvinkää and Lake Keihäsjärvi in the south in Läyliäinen. Lake Keritty and Lake Punelia in the southwestern part of Loppi belong to the Svartån River watershed, which flows through Lake Lohja. Lake Pääjärvi in the northwest corner of Loppi belongs to the Loimijoki River catchment area in the Kokemäki River watershed.

=== Villages ===
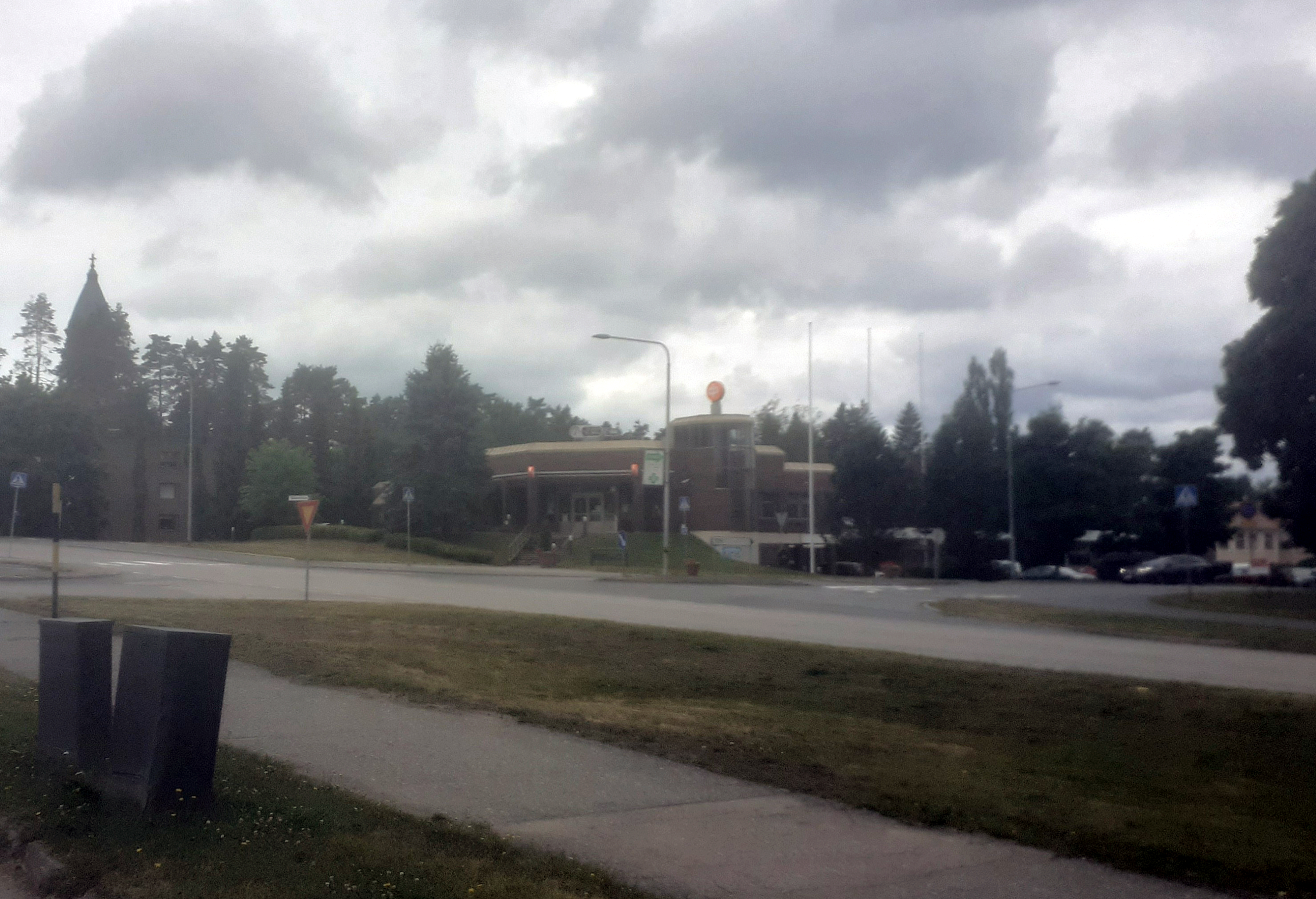
The center of Loppi church village

There are three big villages in the municipality: Loppi (Kirkonkylä), Launonen and Läyliäinen. Most of the inhabitants of the municipality live in these villages, as they are located along the significant main road connections of the municipality.

Other (smaller) villages are Hevosoja, Hirvijärvi, Hunsala, Joentaka, Kormu, Metsäkylä, Ourajoki, Pilpala, Räyskälä, Sajaniemi, Salo, Teväntö, Topeno and Vojakkala.

== Services ==
Loppi's primary health care services are provided by the Regional Health Center of Riihimäki. in the emergency cases, the health care is available at night from the emergency room of Kanta-Häme Central Hospital in Hämeenlinna.

There are seven primary schools and one secondary school in the municipality of Loppi. Etelä-Hämeen Tanssiopisto is a dance college founded by Maiju Milad, whose main hall is located in the center of Loppi church village.

Loppi Library was founded in 1852 and is the third oldest library in Tavastia. The library got its current building in 1988.

== Attractions ==
The church of Saint Birgitta is situated in Loppi. It is commonly called the Santa Pirjo, Pirjo being the Finnish version of the name Birgitta. The church is one of the oldest wooden churches in Finland, being about 300 years old.

Marshal Mannerheim's hunting lodge called the "Marshal's Cabin" (Marskin Maja in Finnish) was moved from Karelia to Loppi in 1942 during the Continuation War. It is located on the side of lake Punelia and nowadays functions as a restaurant and museum.

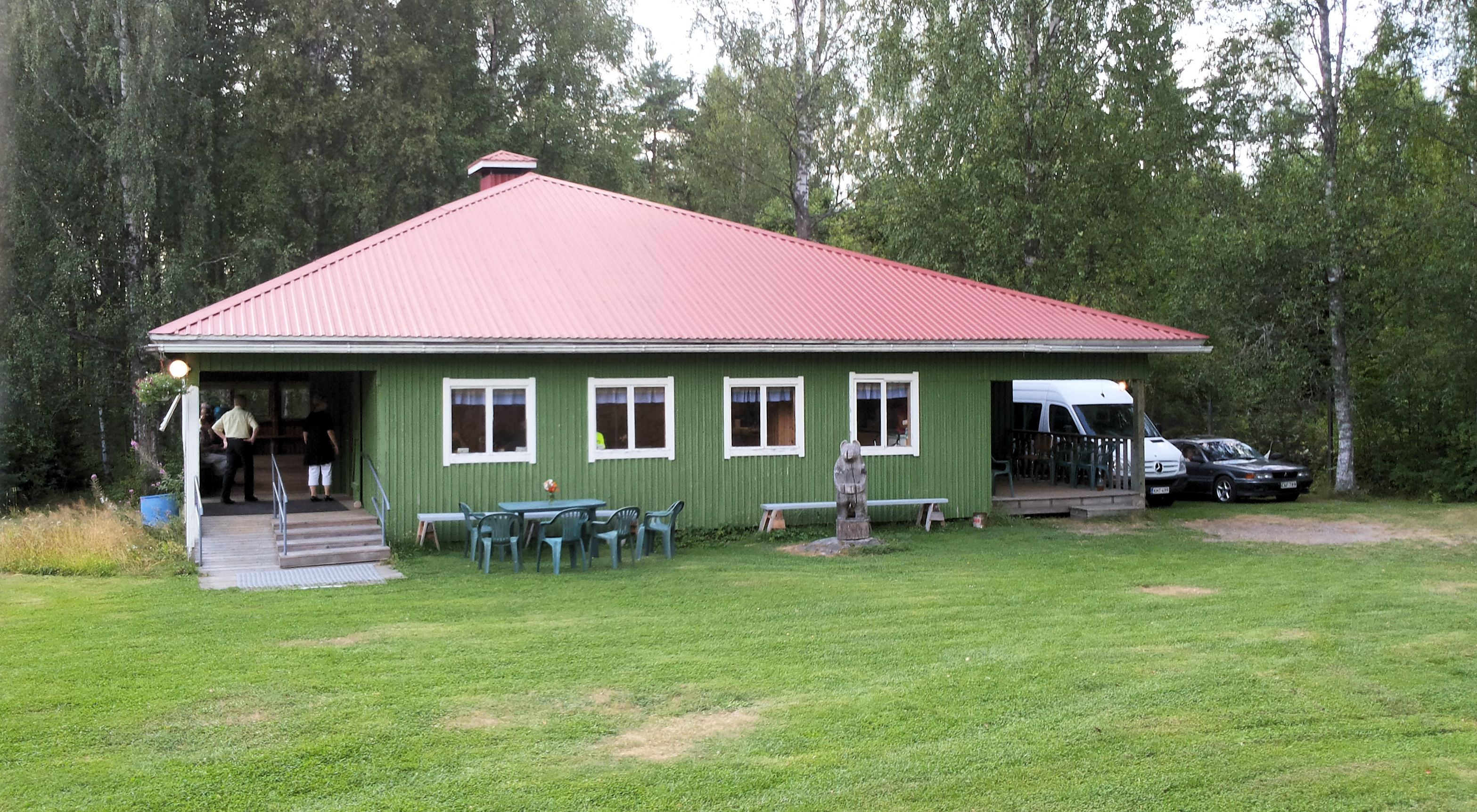
Vojakkalan lava, a local dance hall

The village of Vojakkala has a popular dance hall in summertime, Vojakkalan lava, which is suitable for both stage dances and other events.

The Räyskälä Airfield is located in Loppi. It is home to the Finnish Sports Aviation Academy and one of the busiest general aviation airfields in Finland.

== Notable people ==
- Julius Ailio (1872–1933), an archaeologist and politician
- August Frederik Hollming (1854–1913), a silver- and goldsmith
- Timo Jurkka (born 1963), an actor
- Mikko Lahtio (born 1984), a middle-distance runner
- Sami Lähteenmäki (born 1989), professional ice hockey player
- Heikki Mikkola (born 1945), professional motorcycle racer and four-time Motocross World Champion
- Otto Paajanen (born 1992), professional ice hockey player
- Kalle Sievänen (1911–1996), a sport shooter

== See also ==
- Aamuposti
- Loppi Church
- Loppi Road

== Sources ==
=== Literature ===
- Jorma Kallenautio (1978). Lopen historia kunnallisen itsehallinnon aikana (in Finnish). Loppi: Lopen kunta ja manttaalikunta. ISBN 9519909346.
