= Aamuposti =

Finnish newspaper

- Type: Daily newspaper
- Format: Tabloid
- Publisher: Etelä-Suomen Media Oy
- Editor: Laura Liski
- Founded: 2003; 23 years ago
- Language: Finnish
- Circulation: 18,791 (2013)
- Website: Aamuposti (in Finnish)

Aamuposti is a Finnish language morning daily newspaper published in Finland.

== History and profile ==
Aamuposti was established in 2003. The paper is published by the Suomen Lehtiyhtymä. It is distributed in Hyvinkää, Riihimäki, Loppi, Nurmijärvi and Hausjärvi. Laura Liski is the editor of the daily.

In February 2015 Aamuposti switched from broadsheet format to tabloid format.

Aamuposti had a circulation of 22,164 copies in 2008. Its circulation was 22,000 copies in 2010 and 21,502 copies in 2011. The circulation of the paper was 18,791 copies in 2013.
