= Överuman =

Reservoir in Sweden and Norway

Överuman (Swedish); Över-Uman (Swedish); Umbukta (Norwegian); Byjjesmehkie (Southern Sami)
- Interactive map of the lake
- Location: Västerbotten County, Sweden and Nordland county, Norway
- Coordinates: 66.0500°N 14.8333°E
- Basin countries: Sweden and Norway
- Surface area: 52.49 km^{2} (20.27 sq mi) (3.17 km^{2} or 1.22 sq mi in Norway)
- Shore length^{1}: 129.11 kilometres (80.23 mi)
- Surface elevation: 525 metres (1,722 ft)
- References: NVE
- ^{1} Shore length is not a well-defined measure.

Överuman (Swedish), Över-Uman (Swedish), Umbukta (Norwegian) or Byjjesmehkie (Southern Sami) is a lake on the border between Norway and Sweden. Most of the 52.49-square-kilometre (20.27 sq mi) lake is located in Storuman Municipality in Västerbotten County (southern Swedish Lapland) in Sweden. A small 3.17-square-kilometre (1.22 sq mi) part of the lake, known as Umbukta, is located in Rana Municipality in Nordland County in Norway. The European route E12 highway runs along the eastern side of the lake. The lake lies just southeast of the large lake Storakersvatnet.

== See also ==
- List of lakes in Norway
- Geography of Norway
