= Finnish national road 3 =

Highway in Finland

National Road 3
- Valtatie 3 (Finnish); Riksväg 3 (Swedish)
- Hämeenlinna Highway, Tampere Highway
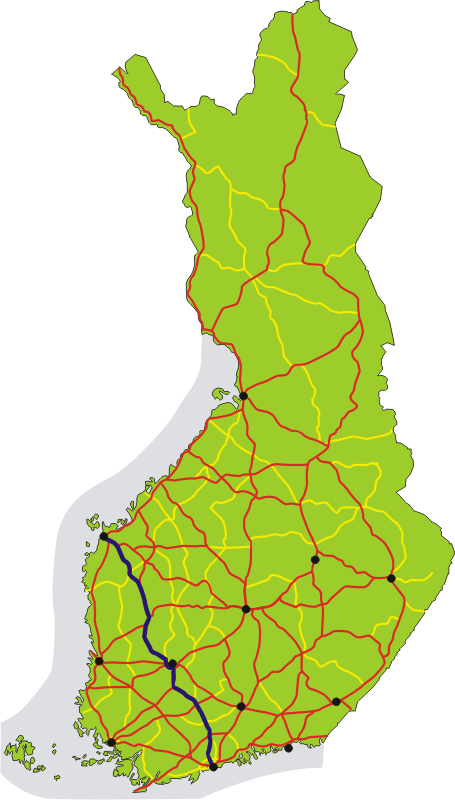

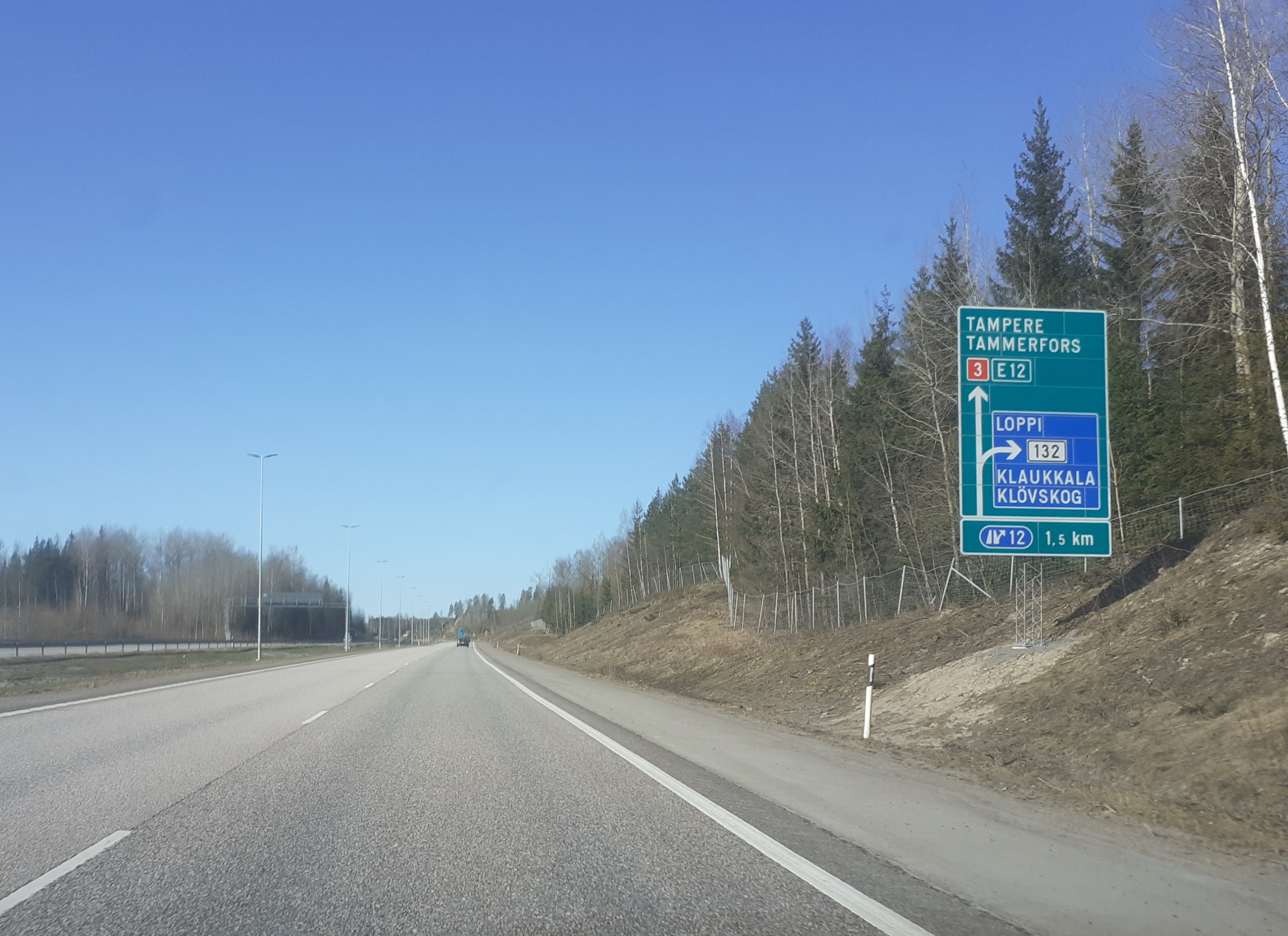

Route information
- Part of E12
- Maintained by the Finnish Road Administration
- Length: 424 km (263 mi)
- Existed: 1938–present

Major junctions
- North end: Vt 8 and link road 6741 in Vaasa
- South end: Mannerheimintie in Helsinki

Location
- Country: Finland
- Major cities: Hämeenlinna, Tampere

Highway system
- Highways in Finland
← Vt 2	→ Vt 4

Finnish national road 3 (Finnish: Valtatie 3 or Kolmostie; Swedish: Riksväg 3) is a highway in Finland between Helsinki and Vaasa via Hämeenlinna and Tampere. The road is 424 kilometres (263 mi) long and it is part of the European route E12. 180 kilometres (110 mi) of the highway is motorway, connecting Helsinki to Tampere. North of Tampere, the road is mostly two-lane road, with a share of 2+1 road. The busiest point on Highway 3 is in Helsinki, north of the Ring I junction, where the average traffic volume is about 90,000 vehicles per day.

Back in the late 1950s before the current freeway, the Finnish regional road 132 (Mt 132) was the former main road to Hämeenlinna and Tampere via Loppi and Janakkala.

== Route ==
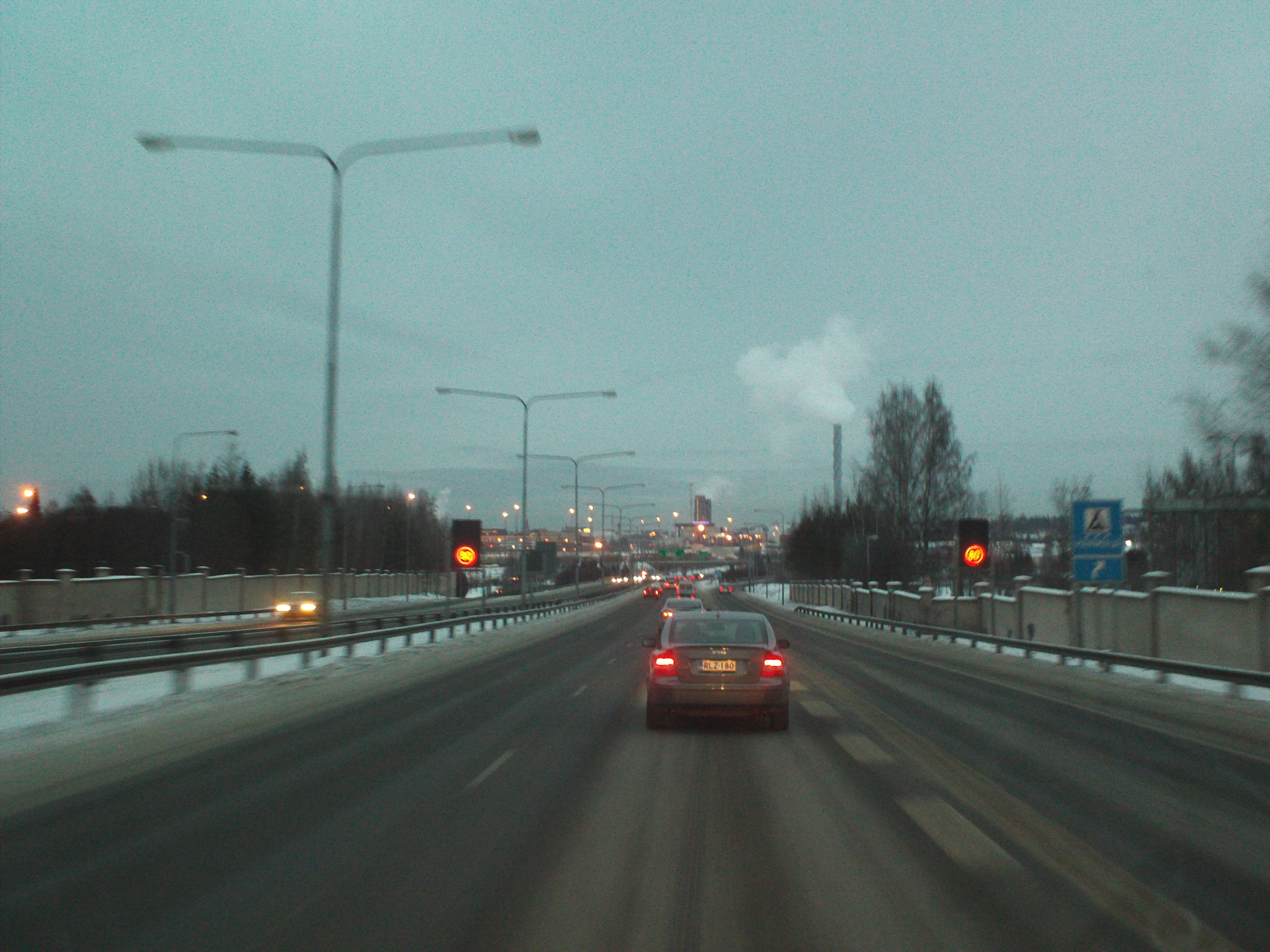
Arriving in Tampere from Helsinki along highway 3

The route of the road is: Helsinki – Vantaa – Nurmijärvi – Hyvinkää – Riihimäki – Janakkala – Hämeenlinna – Hattula – Kalvola – Valkeakoski – Akaa – Valkeakoski (again) – Lempäälä – Tampere – Pirkkala – Nokia – Tampere (again) – Ylöjärvi – Hämeenkyrö – Ikaalinen – Parkano – Jalasjärvi – Kurikka – Ilmajoki – Isokyrö – Laihia – Korsholm – Vaasa.

Highway 3 starts in Helsinki at the end of the Mannerheimintie street. Between the Kivihaka and Ring III, Highway 3 is a high-quality four-lane highway, all connections of which are interchanges (except the motorway). The entire section between Ring III and the town of Ylöjärvi is a four-lane motorway. At 180 kilometres long, it is the longest motorway in Finland. In the Greater Helsinki, the road is also called Hämeenlinnanväylä, sometimes in colloquial language also Tampereenväylä. The former name of the road is Nurmijärventie, referring to the municipality of Nurmijärvi along the way. The traffic volumes on the highway are quite high all the way. For example, in the case of Riihimäki, the volume of road traffic is about 30,000 vehicles per day.

Highway 3 runs right next to the city center at Hämeenlinna. This throughway, which was completed in 1964, is the first section of the road and the third section in Finland that was built as a motorway. Today, the road runs for about 200 meters in a tunnel, when the Goodman Shopping Center in Hämeenlinna was completed in 2014 on the pavement. Attention has also been paid to the aesthetics of the highway environment. Some of the bridges at Highway 3 can be considered almost works of art and the rock cuts have been illuminated. Ekku Peltomäki's light art work Lux Tavastia is next to Akaa's Terisjärvi.

To the south of Tampere city center, Highway 3 turns onto Tampere's western ring road, which is also a motorway. The western ring road was completed as a two-lane road, partly as a two-lane expressway in 1985. The motorway ends slightly west of the center of Ylöjärvi, and the highway turns from the ring road at the Elovainio interchange to the road between Tampere and Vaasa. Between Ylöjärvi and Vaasa, Highway 3 is a standard Finnish two-lane highway, the quality of which varies. Some of the major interfaces have been upgraded to intermodal interfaces. In addition, there is an 11-kilometre-long motorway between Korsholm's Helsingby and Vaasa. The road ends in the center of Vaasa. The motorway is partially shared with Finnish national road 8, which joins the line of road 3 in Helsingby, before branching off in Liisanlehto to a bypass road.

== See also ==
- Highways in Finland
- Lopentie
- Åland Islands Highway 3
