= Jukka Vanninen =

Finnish footballer (born 1977)

Personal information
- Date of birth: 31 January 1977 (age 49)
- Place of birth: Riihimäki, Finland
- Height: 1.76 m (5 ft 9 1/2 in)
- Position: Midfielder

Youth career
- 1988–1994: RiPS
- 1995: FC Jazz
- 1996: HJK Helsinki

Senior career*
Years	Team	Apps	(Gls)
1993–1994	RiPS	26	(2)
1995	FC Jazz	4	(0)
1997	Honka	20	(0)
1998–1999	RiPS	42	(5)
1999–2001	Exeter City	5	(0)
2000	→ Bashley (loan)	3	(0)
2001–2004	FC Hämeenlinna	93	(8)
2005–2006	KTP	44	(2)
2007	FC Hämeenlinna	20	(3)
2008–2010	FC Lahti	62	(1)
2011	FC Hämeenlinna	21	(0)
2012–2013	RiPS	9	(0)
Total		349	(21)
- * Club domestic league appearances and goals as of 6 July 2018

Jukka Vanninen (born 31 January 1977) is a retired Finnish football player who last played for RiPS.
