= Topeno =

Village in Loppi, Finland

Coordinates: 60°46′03″N 24°17′43″E

Topeno is a village in the western part of the municipality of Loppi in Kanta-Häme, Finland. Together with the village of Vojakkala, Topeno is one of the nationally significant built cultural environments in Finland.

The village of Topeno is first mentioned in documents in 1470. The oldest known houses in Topeno are Hurri, Tirra, Hemmo, Suutari, Sorri, Hokraa and Peura. Newer farms are Siukola, Lukana, Kallela, Pekkala and Ollikkala. The village was divided during the Great Partition into a large village formed by the old village center and a small village formed by Vähä-Peura, Iso-Peura and Hokkala, which has been inhabited since the 17th century. Today, the main houses of the large village of Topeno, Hemmo, Sorri, Hurri and Suutari, are located in a row north of the Topeno River along the Topenontie. The buildings of the village date mainly from the 1910s and 1920s. Between the big and small village stands a school building built in 1899 and expanded in 1923, which since autumn 2010 has been operating under the name of West Loppi School (Länsi-Lopen koulu) with the help of three teachers and also receives students from Vojakkala. There are three to four rapids in the Topeno River near the village, which used to use many mills for hydropower.

== See also ==
- Finnish national road 54
- Vojakkala (Loppi)
