= Rolls (restaurant chain) =

Finnish fast-food chain

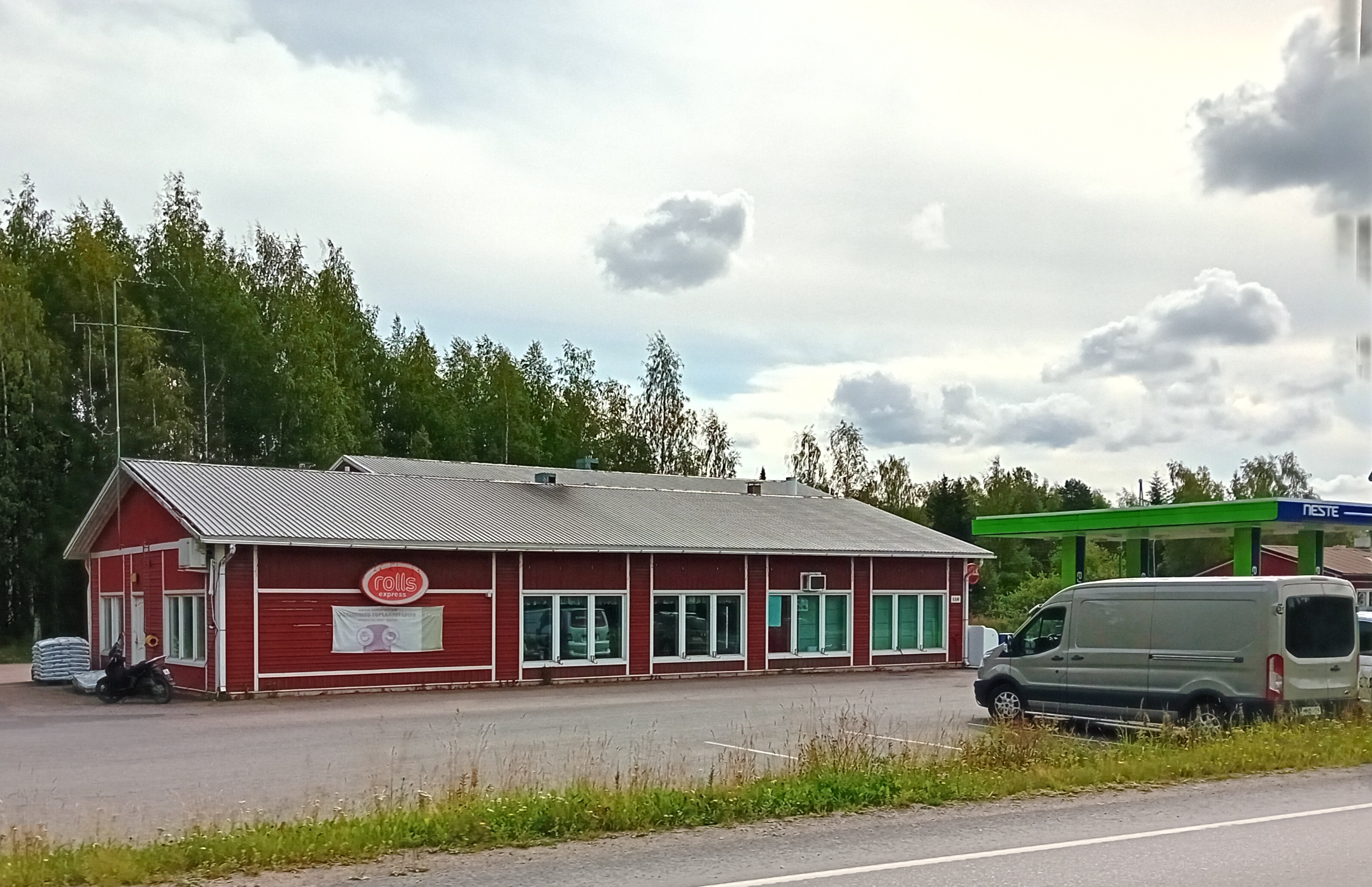
- A Rolls restaurant in Läyliäinen in 2023
- Industry: Restaurants
- Founded: 1988; 38 years ago in Seinäjoki
- Founders: Jouko Huumo; Soile Ojala; Tommi Oksanen
- Headquarters: Mikkeli, Finland
- Number of locations: 100+ (2024)
- Area served: Finland
- Key people: Arto Virtakari (CEO)
- Products: Fast food
- Owner: Jokes Family Oy
- Website: rolls.fi

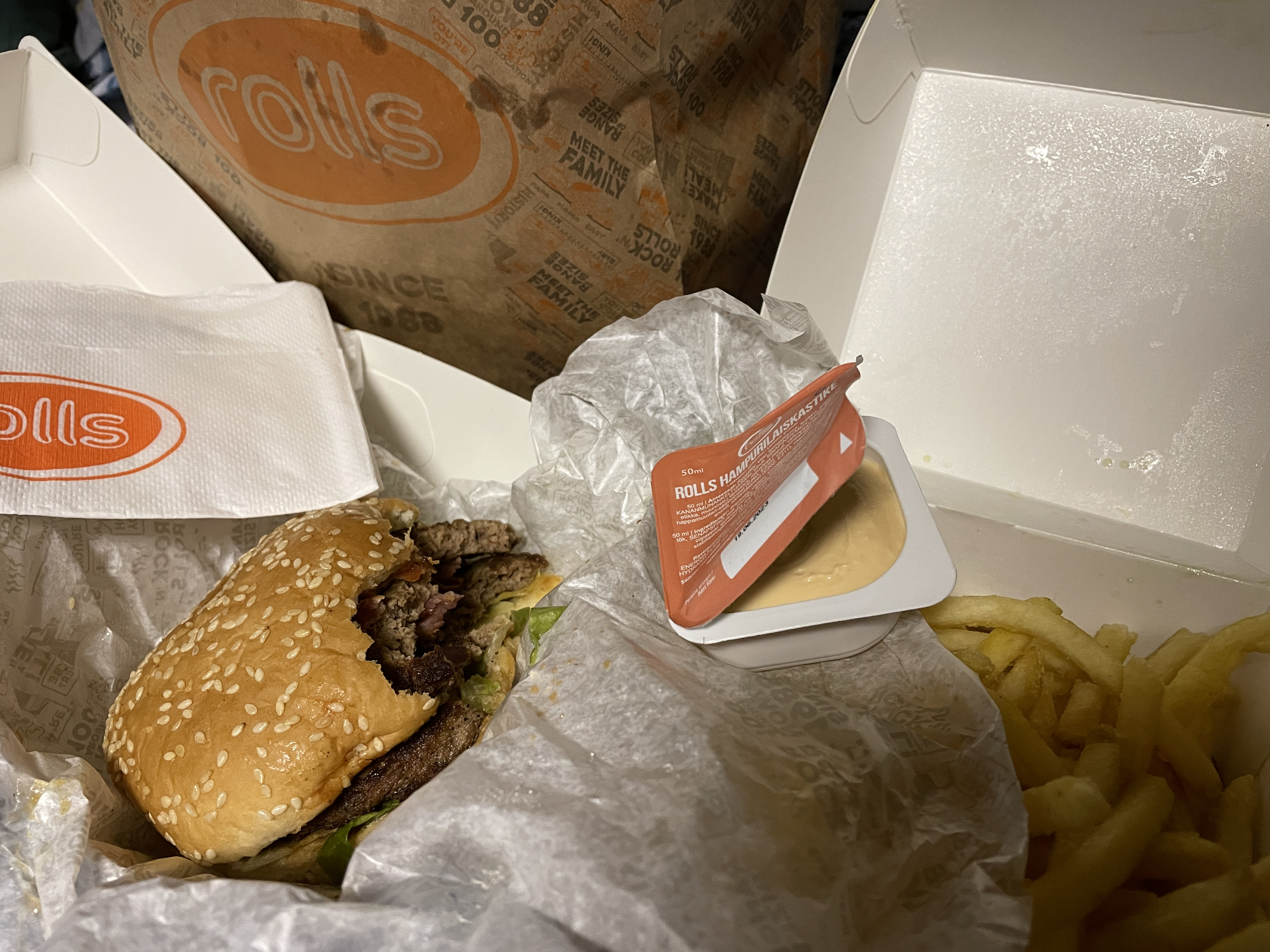
Takeout burger and fries from Rolls

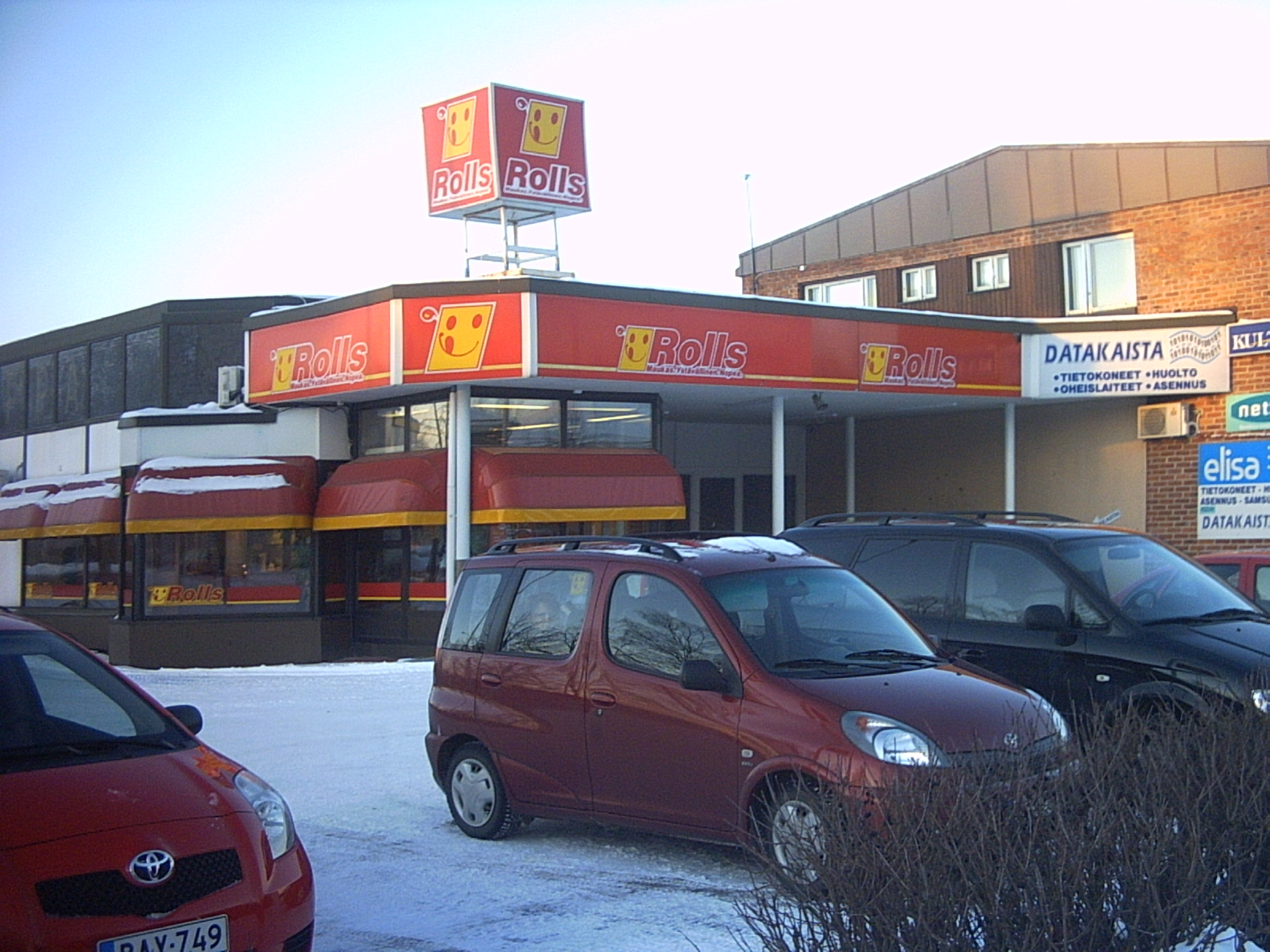
A Rolls restaurant in Kauhava in 2008

Rolls is a Finnish chain of hamburger fast food restaurants. The first Rolls restaurant was opened in Seinäjoki in 1988. Owned by Jokes Family Oy, the chain has over one hundred restaurants throughout the country as of 2024.

Rolls operates on an entrepreneur-driven franchising principle, primarily using a store-within-a-store concept alongside other businesses. Most of the restaurants are located in shopping centers or service stations. The chain does not charge entrepreneurs a joining fee or impose penalties for terminating the agreement.

== See also ==
- List of hamburger restaurants
