= Kvarken Bridge =

Proposed bridge across Gulf of Bothnia

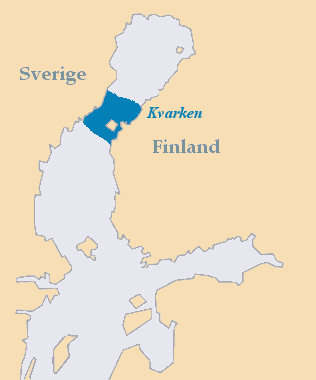
The area (in blue) where the bridge is planned.

Kvarken Bridge (Finnish: Merenkurkun silta, Swedish: Kvarkenbron) is a proposed bridge between Sweden and Finland across the strait of Kvarken as a part of the European route E12. The cost of the bridge has been estimated to about 1.5 to 2 billion euros. There are islands in the strait, and the sum of the lengths of the probably three bridge parts would be about 40 kilometres (25 mi). There is a debate in the coastal cities on both sides, like Umeå in Sweden and Vaasa in Finland.

The working group for the bridge has proposed a three-step programme:

1. To ensure that there is a ferry connection across the Kvarken. The current connection operated by Wasa Line is unprofitable.
2. To build a ferry harbour on Replot, Korsholm, to shorten the current travel time of 6 hours to about 5.
3. To build a bridge across the Kvarken.

In 2007, the Swedish Västerbotten business owners' association planned to commission a report into the significance of a bridge for the development of the region.

In 2024, Finland announced that it would spend 200,000 euros on preliminary studies for a future bridge.

A part of the area examined for a future bridge is a UNESCO World Heritage Site. If a future bridge were to avoid this area completely, the cost of a future bridge would rise considerably.
