= Loppi Church =

- Finnish: Lopen kirkko Swedish: Loppis kyrka
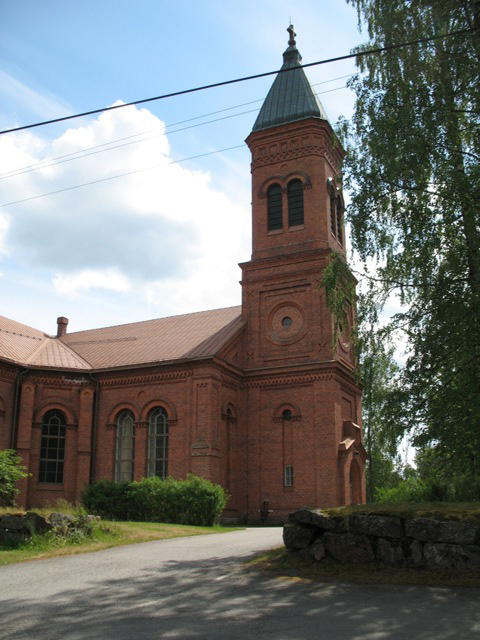
- Loppi Church
- 60°43′02.71″N 24°26′25.48″E
- Location: Loppi
- Country: Finland
- Website: www.lopenseurakunta.fi/lopen-kirkko

Architecture
- Architect(s): Konstantin Kiseleff; Elia Heikel
- Style: Gothic Revival
- Completed: 1888

Specifications
- Capacity: 800

Administration
- Diocese: Tampere
- Parish: Loppi

The Loppi Church (Finnish: Lopen kirkko; Swedish: Loppis kyrka) is the 19th-century Gothic Revival red-brick church located in the Loppi municipality in Kanta-Häme, Finland. The building was designed by Konstantin Kiseleff and Elia Heikel, and it was completed in 1888. The church burned down in 1914 and, after the renovation, it was reopened in 1921.

The church's first 21-tone pipe organ was manufactured by the Kangasala's organ factory in 1926. The current 29-tone pipe organ from 1988 was manufactured by the Danish company Christensen & Sønner.

== See also ==
- Loppi Old Church

== Sources ==
=== Further reading ===
- Haapio, Markku; Luostarinen, Laura (1980). Suomen kirkot ja kirkkotaide (in Finnish). Vol. 2. Lieto: Etelä-Suomen kustannus. ISBN 9519064281.
