= Finnish national road 54 =

Road in Finland

Highway 54
- Kantatie 54 (Finnish); Stamväg 54 (Swedish)
- Kantatie 54, Stamväg 54
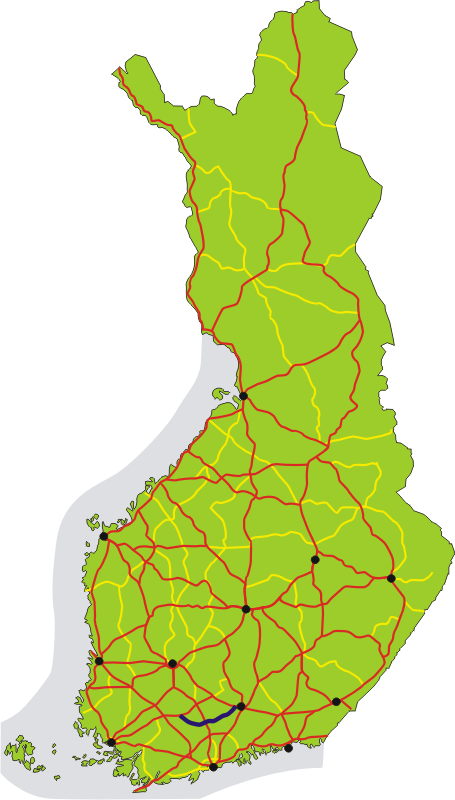

Route information
- Maintained by the Finnish Transport Agency
- Length: 97 km (60 mi)

Major junctions
- From: Hollola
- To: Tammela

Location
- Country: Finland
- Major cities: Riihimäki

Highway system
- Highways in Finland
← Kt 53	→ Kt 55

The Finnish national road 54 (Finnish: Kantatie 54; Swedish: Stamväg 54) is the 2nd class main route between the municipalities of Hollola and Tammela in southern Finland. It runs from Airikkala in Hollola passes through the Riihimäki town and little part of Hämeenlinna town to the national road 10 in Tammela, where it turns into a smaller regional road going to the Teuro village.

== History ==
In the 1938 numbering system, main road 54 ran from Loppi via Tammela and Forssa to Vaulammi in Jokioinen and connected the then-national roads 3 and 2.

In the village of Kormu in Loppi, approximately 3 kilometers of main road 54 between the current Sipiläntie and Tiilitehtaantie roads runs along the former Riihimäki–Loppi railway embankment, and in Hausjärvi, partly along the then-national road 4. The Kormu stop was located north of the current main road 54 and east of the current Kartanontie road.

After the new alignments of highways 2, 3 and 10 were completed, the road moved between Tammela and Riihimäki. This section was built mainly in the 1960s and partly in the 1950s. The section between Riihimäki and Hollola was built in the 1970s, and it received its current number after its completion at the turn of the 1970s and 1980s.

== Route ==
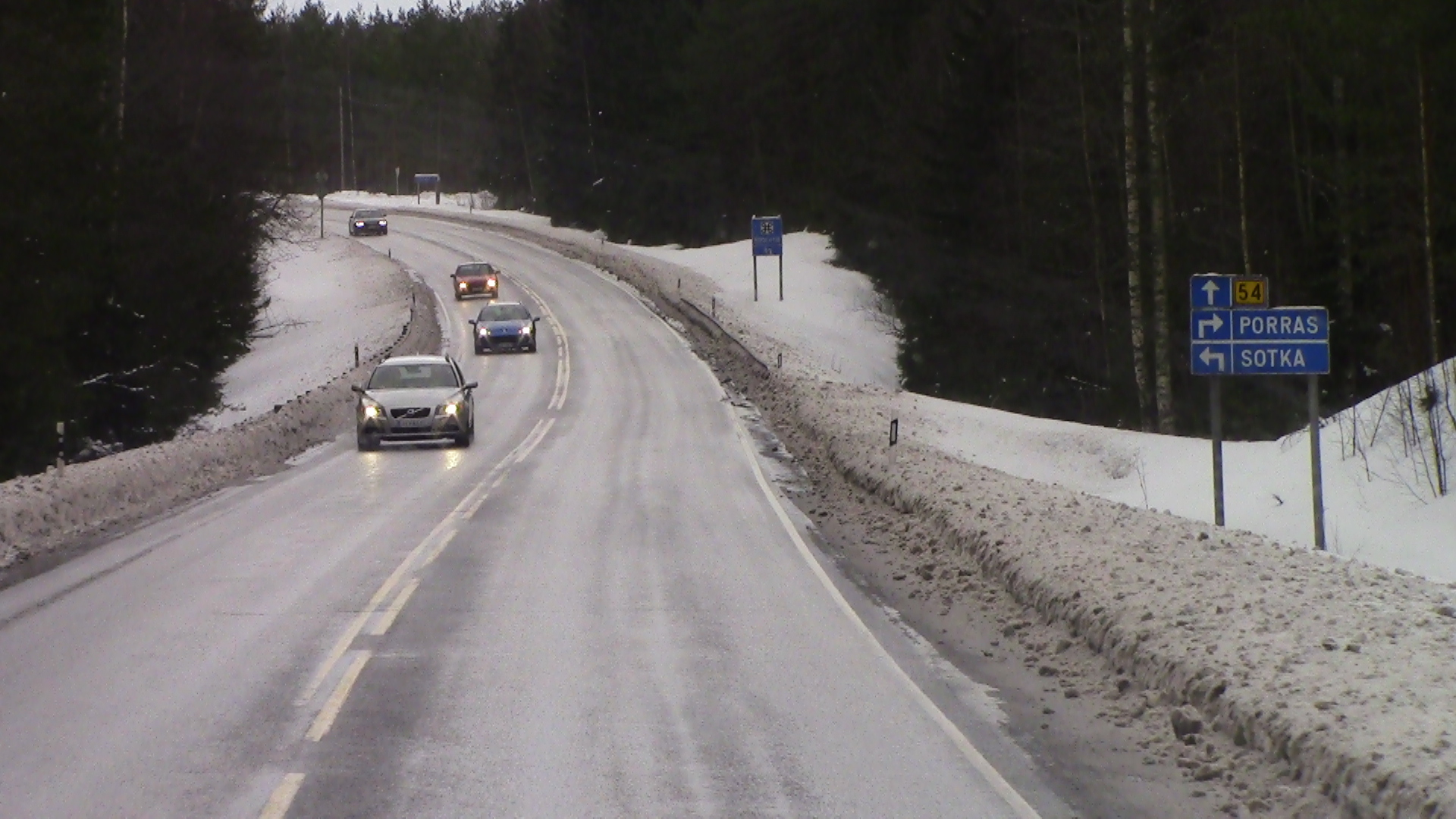
The Finnish national road 54 at Hämeenlinna, near the crossroad of Härkätie.

The road passes through the following localities:

- Hollola (Airikkala)
- Kärkölä (Järvelä and Lappila)
- Hausjärvi (Mommila, Oitti and Karhi)
- Riihimäki
- Loppi (Kormu, Launonen, Loppi, Topeno and Vojakkala)
- Hämeenlinna (Lietsa)
- Tammela
