= Sami Lähteenmäki =

Finnish ice hockey player

- Born: 19 September 1989 (age 36) Loppi, Finland
- Height: 6 ft 0 in (183 cm)
- Weight: 190 lb (86 kg; 13 st 8 lb)
- Position: Right wing
- Shot: Left
- Played for: HPK; Ässät; SaPKo; Lukko; TUTO Hockey; LeKi; Jukurit
- NHL draft: Undrafted
- Playing career: 2007–2020

Sami Lähteenmäki (born 19 September 1989) is a Finnish ice hockey player currently playing for Lukko of the Finnish Liiga.

Lähteenmäki made his SM-liiga debut playing with HPK during the 2007–08 SM-liiga season.

== Career statistics ==
			Regular season					Playoffs
Season	Team	League	GP	G	A	Pts	PIM	GP	G	A	Pts	PIM
2003–04	HPK U16	U16 I-divisioona	11	12	11	23	6	—	—	—	—	—
2004–05	HPK U16	U16 SM-sarja	6	3	6	9	0	—	—	—	—	—
2004–05	HPK U18	U18 SM-sarja	27	7	7	14	10	—	—	—	—	—
2005–06	HPK U18	U18 SM-sarja	20	7	10	17	32	2	0	2	2	6
2005–06	HPK U20	U20 SM-liiga	19	1	3	4	8	3	0	0	0	2
2006–07	HPK U18	U18 SM-sarja	5	0	1	1	18	—	—	—	—	—
2006–07	HPK U20	U20 SM-liiga	23	7	6	13	10	—	—	—	—	—
2007–08	HPK U20	U20 SM-liiga	14	10	1	11	66	9	0	1	1	12
2007–08	HPK	SM-liiga	17	0	0	0	27	—	—	—	—	—
2007–08	Suomi U20	Mestis	2	1	0	1	2	—	—	—	—	—
2008–09	HPK U20	U20 SM-liiga	6	3	2	5	29	2	1	0	1	2
2008–09	HPK	SM-liiga	9	0	1	1	0	—	—	—	—	—
2008–09	LeKi	Mestis	16	5	4	9	8	—	—	—	—	—
2008–09	TUTO Hockey	Mestis	4	2	1	3	0	—	—	—	—	—
2008–09	Suomi U20	Mestis	11	2	2	4	2	—	—	—	—	—
2009–10	HPK U20	U20 SM-liiga	4	1	3	4	14	1	0	0	0	0
2009–10	HPK	SM-liiga	19	0	1	1	4	—	—	—	—	—
2009–10	SaPKo	Mestis	1	1	0	1	0	—	—	—	—	—
2009–10	LeKi	Mestis	7	0	1	1	6	—	—	—	—	—
2009–10	TUTO Hockey	Mestis	3	0	2	2	0	—	—	—	—	—
2010–11	Jukurit	Mestis	46	26	17	43	41	11	5	5	10	30
2012–13	Porin Ässät	SM-liiga	41	5	3	8	12	14	0	1	1	2
2013–14	Porin Ässät	Liiga	46	16	8	24	16	—	—	—	—	—
2014–15	Porin Ässät	Liiga	42	10	19	29	14	2	0	0	0	2
2015–16	Lukko	Liiga	60	6	13	19	10	5	0	0	0	0
2016–17	Lukko	Liiga	59	12	10	22	14	—	—	—	—	—
2017–18	Porin Ässät	Liiga	47	13	11	24	33	—	—	—	—	—
2018–19	Porin Ässät	Liiga	15	4	5	9	4	—	—	—	—	—
2019–20	Porin Ässät	Liiga	37	2	11	13	12	—	—	—	—	—
Liiga totals			392	68	82	150	146	21	0	1	1	4
