= Kernaalanjärvi =

- Location within Finland
- Location: Loppi, Finland
- Coordinates: 60°41′N 024°26′E
- Lake type: Lake
- Primary outflows: Tervajoki river
- Catchment area: Kokemäenjoki
- Basin countries: Finland
- Surface area: 4.448 km^{2} (1.717 sq mi)
- Average depth: 3.28 m (10.8 ft)
- Max. depth: 7.91 m (26.0 ft)
- Water volume: 0.0146 km^{3} (11,800 acre⋅ft)
- Shore length^{1}: 14.58 km (9.06 mi)
- Surface elevation: 79.4 m (260 ft)
- Frozen: December–April
- Islands: none
- Settlements: Janakkala
- ^{1} Shore length is not a well-defined measure.

Kernaalanjärvi is a medium-sized lake in Finland. It is situated in the municipality of Janakkala in the Kanta-Häme region. The lake is part of Kokemäenjoki basin and it drains into Lake Vanajavesi through Hiidenjoki River.

== See also ==
- List of lakes in Finland
