= Pirjo =

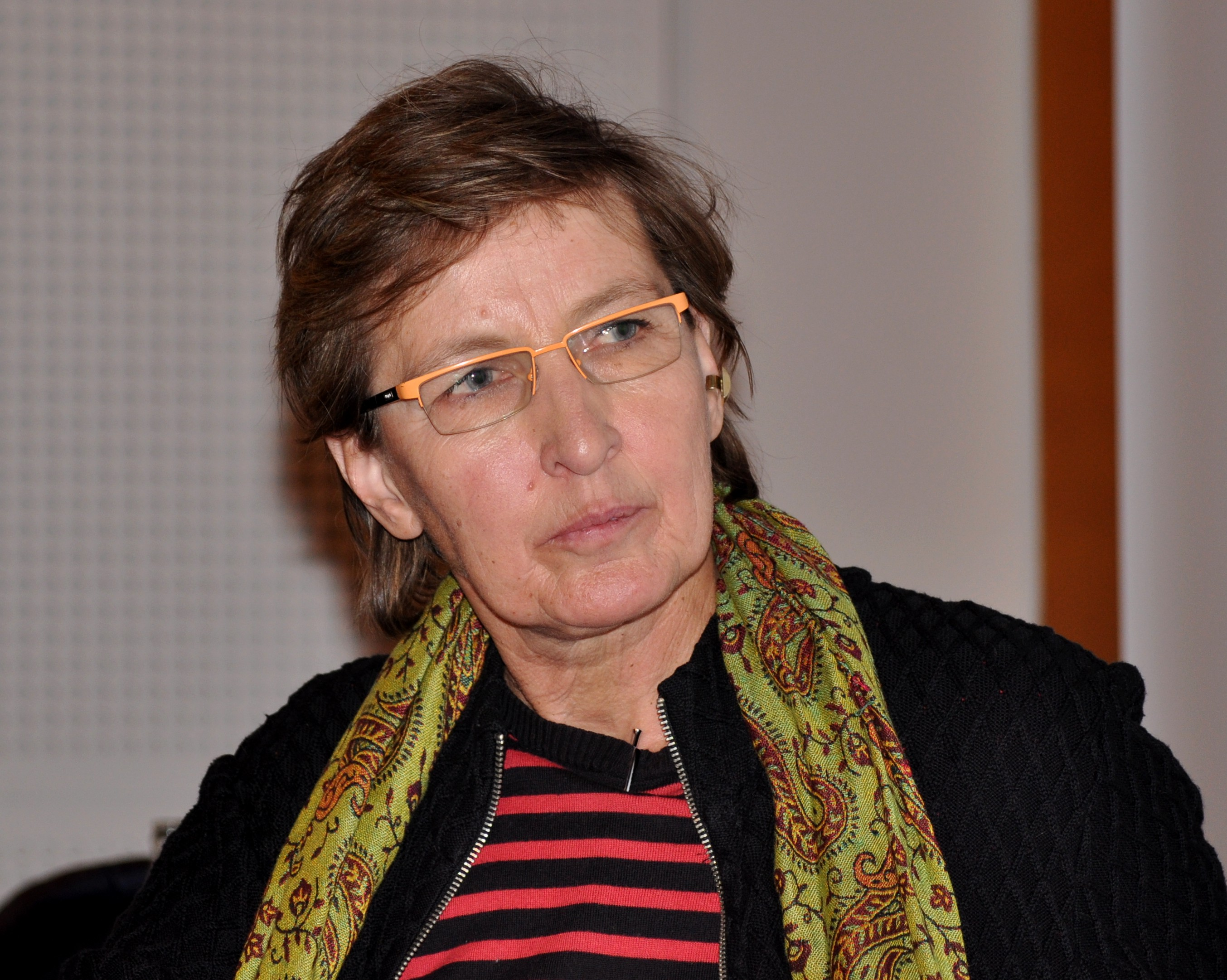
Pirjo Honkasalo, Finnish filmmaker

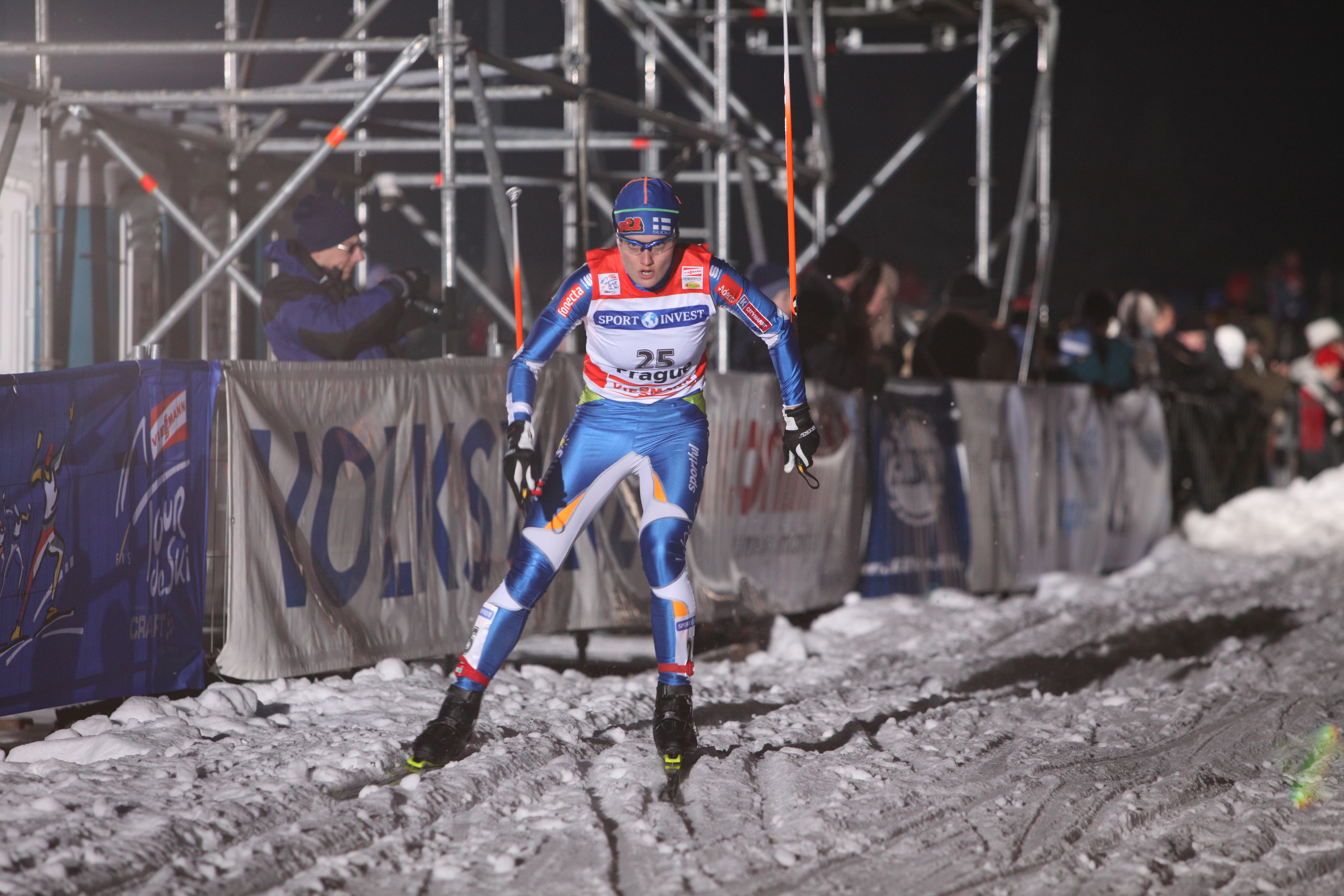
Pirjo Muranen, Finnish cross country skier

Pirjo is a Finnish female given name. Its name day is celebrated on 7 October. It began to be used in the 1920s, and it reached its peak of popularity in the 1940s and 1950s. As of 2013 there are 34,650 women with this name in Finland.

== Origin and variants ==
The name Pirjo originated as a short form of Birgitta and Piritta, Finnish versions of Brigid. A common variant is Pirkko.

== Notable people ==
Notable people with this name include:

- Pirjo Ala-Kapee-Hakulinen (born 1944), Finnish politician
- Pirjo Häggman, Finnish sprinter
- Pirjo Honkasalo, Finnish filmmaker
- Pirjo Leppikangas, Finnish football defender
- Pirjo Muranen, Finnish cross country skier
- Pirjo Ruotsalainen, Finnish orienteering competitor
- Pirjo Seppä, Finnish orienteering competitor
