= Loppi (village) =

Lopen kirkonkylä
- Municipal centre
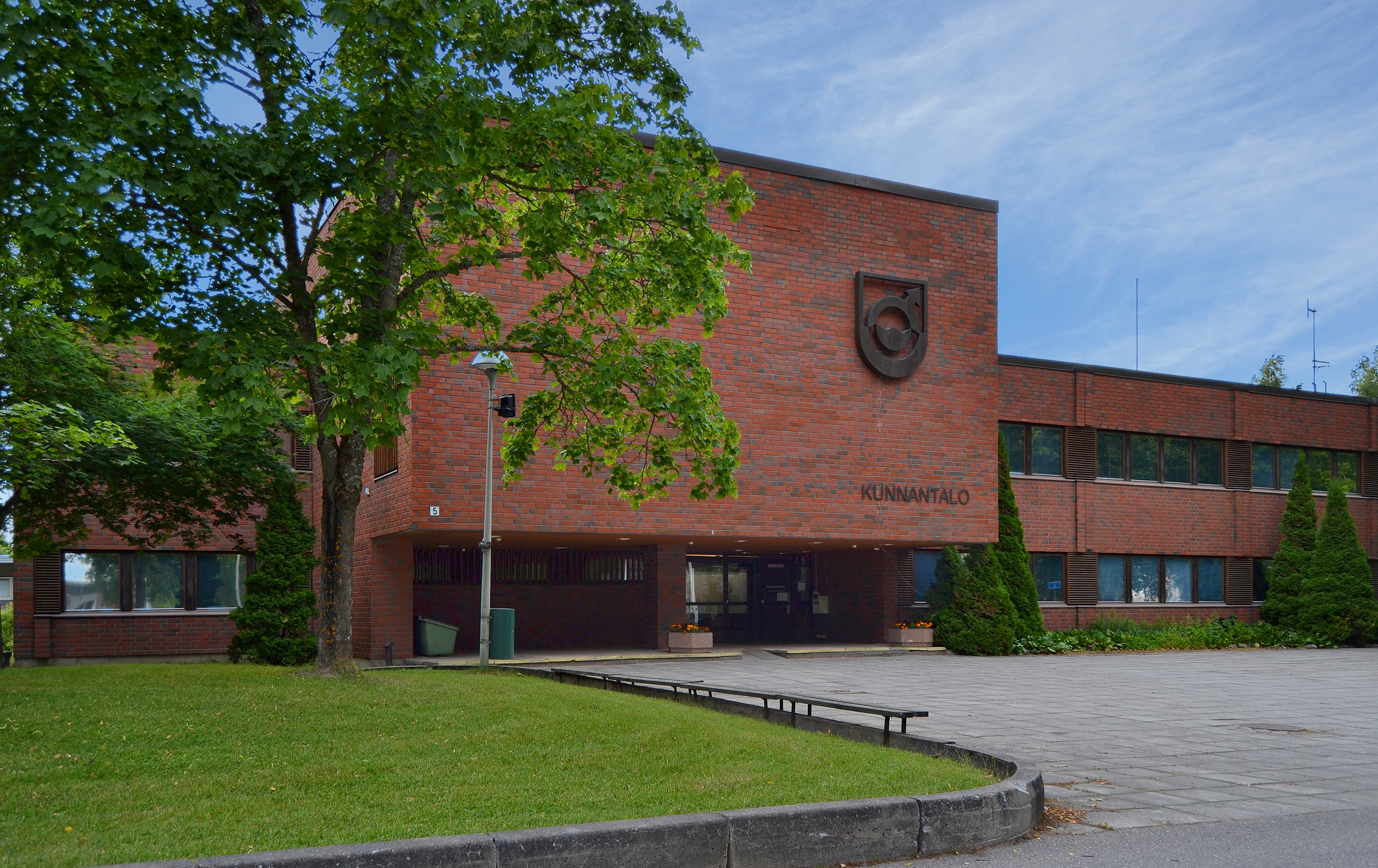
- The municipal building in the village.

- Location in Finland
- Coordinates: 60°43′00″N 24°26′30″E
- Country: Finland
- Region: Kanta-Häme
- Municipality: Loppi

Area
  - Total: 7.18 km^{2} (2.77 sq mi)

Population (31 December 2017)
  - Total: 2,207
  - Density: 3,074/km^{2} (7,960/sq mi)
- Time zone: UTC+2 (EET)
  - Summer (DST): UTC+3 (EEST)
- Postal code: 12700

Lopen kirkonkylä (lit. 'Loppi church village') is the administrative center of the Loppi municipality in Kanta-Häme, Finland, and also its largest urban area with a population of more than 2,000. It is located on the northern shore of Loppijärvi, along the main road 54 between Forssa and Riihimäki. The distance to Riihimäki is 19 kilometres (12 mi). To the east is the regional road 132, which starts from the main road and runs south in the direction of Helsinki, along which the Läyliäinen village is located about 12 kilometers from the Kirkonkylä.

There are two churches in the area: the old wooden church of Saint Birgitta (Santa Pirjo), located one kilometer away from the Kirkonkylä on the shores of Loppijärvi, and the newer red brick church of Loppi, located near the center of Kirkonkylä. Other main services include a municipal health center, two grocery stores (K-market and S-market), a library founded in 1852, and a primary school founded in 1921, as well as a high school.
