= European route E12 =

Road in trans-European E-road network

E12

Route information
- Length: 910 km (570 mi)

Major junctions
- West end: Mo i Rana, Norway
- East end: Helsinki, Finland

Location
- Countries: Norway, Sweden, Finland

Highway system
- International E-road network; A Class; B Class

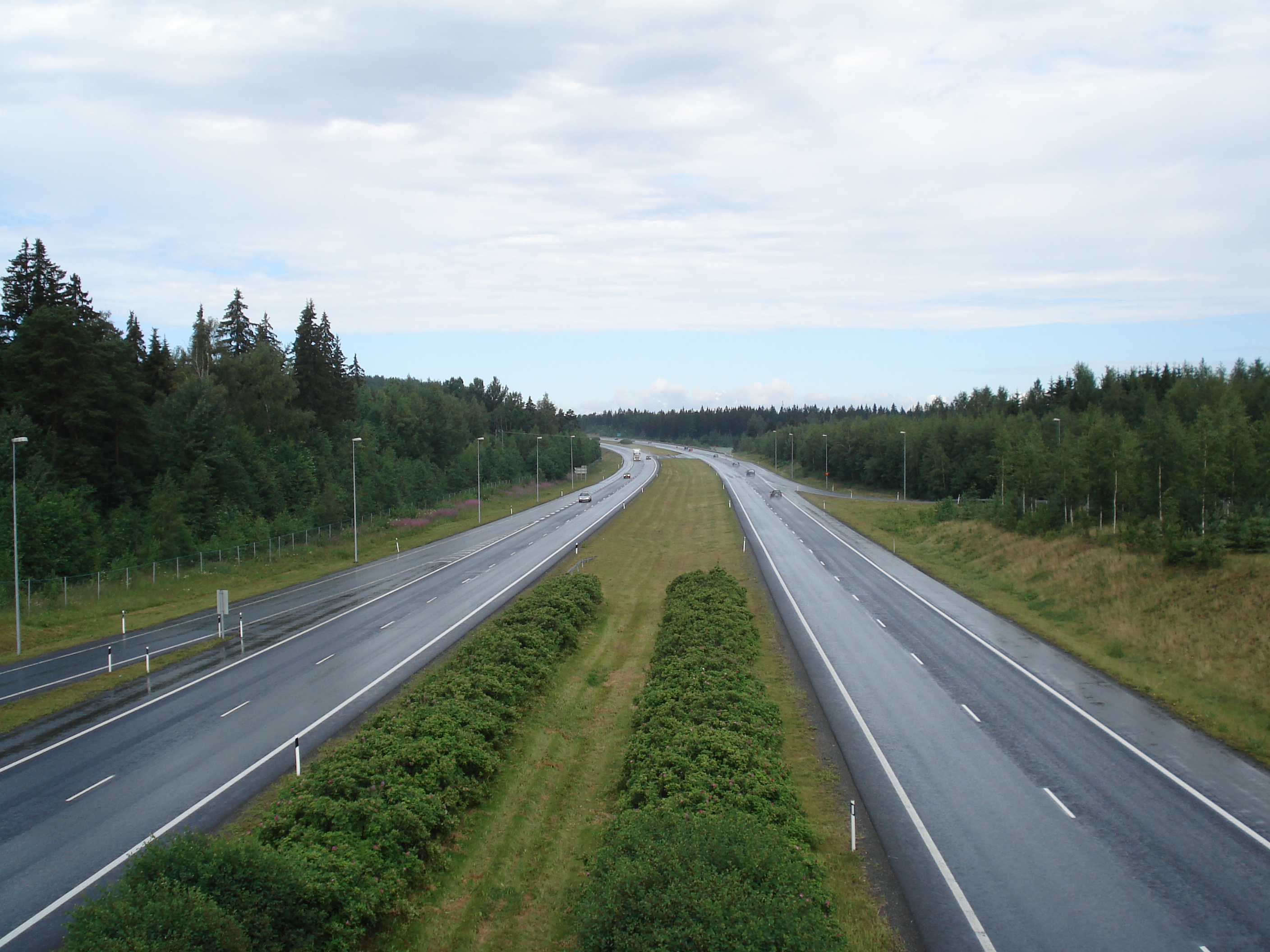
The E12 in Parola, Finland

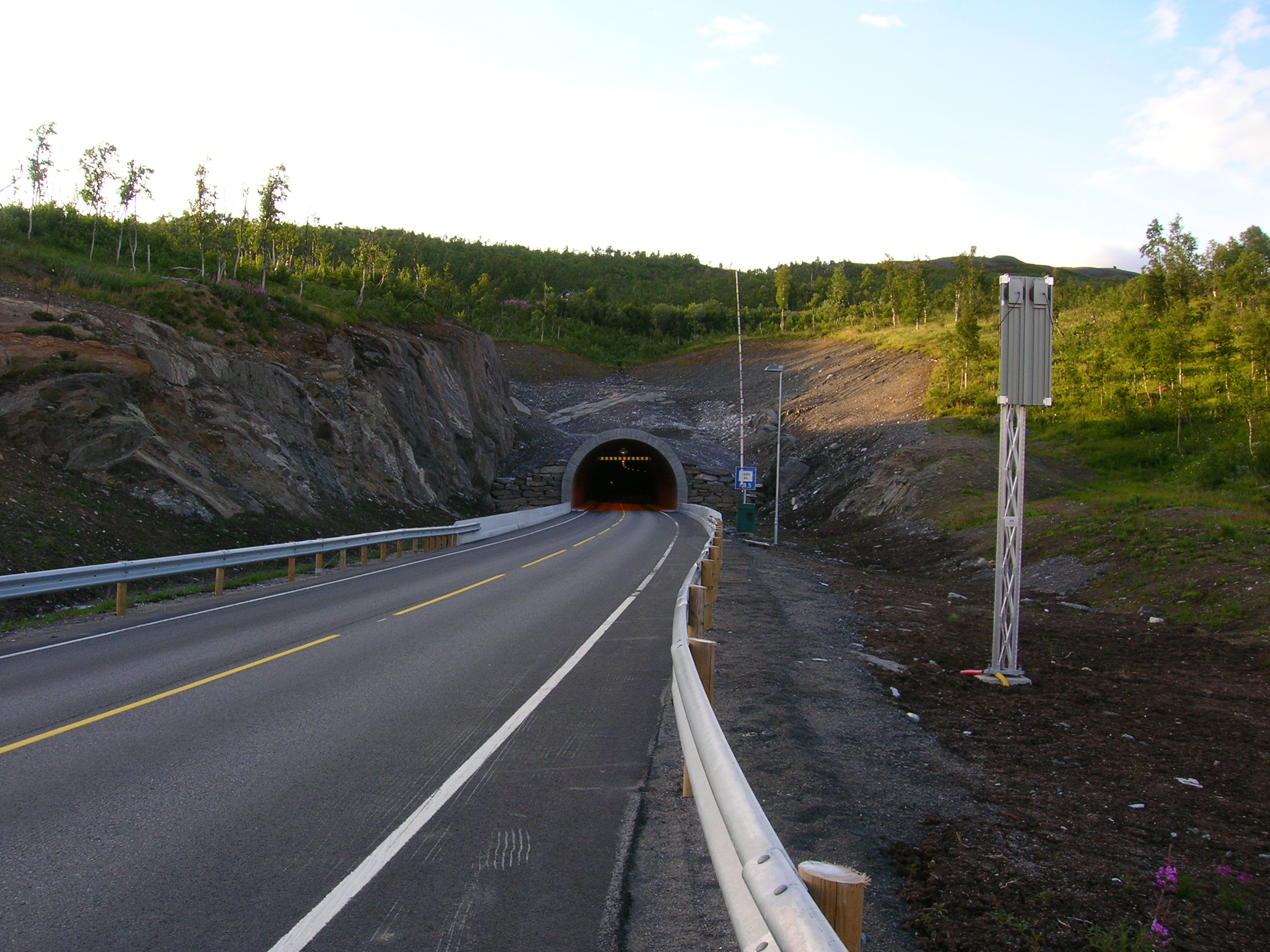
The E12 in Norway

European route E12 is a road that is part of the International E-road network. It begins in Mo i Rana, Norway, transverses Sweden and ends in Helsinki, Finland, with a ferry line between Sweden and Finland. The part within Finland is Finnish national highway 3. The road is about 910 kilometres (570 miles) in length.

The ferry service between Holmsund and Vaasa is operated by Wasa Line using the M/S Aurora Botnia, with up to two daily departures in each direction taking about three and a half hours.

A road bridge, known as the Kvarken Bridge has been proposed by parties on both sides of the Gulf, along which the E12 could continue without ferry connections. No commitment has been made to build such a fixed link.

== Blue Highway ==
The European route E12 from Mo i Rana to Vaasa is part of the Blue Highway, which is an international tourist route from Norway to Russia via Sweden and Finland.

== Route ==
- Norway
  - E12: Mo i Rana - Umbukta - Norway/Sweden border
- Sweden
  - E12: Norway/Sweden border - Storuman ( E45) - Umeå ( E4) - Holmsund
- Gap
  - : (Sweden) Holmsund - (Finland) Vaasa
- Finland
  - E12: Vaasa port - Vaasa
  - Vt 3: Vaasa ( E8) - Tampere ( E63) - Akaa ( E63) -Helsinki ( E18 E75)
