= Riihimäki =

Town in Kanta-Häme, Finland

- Town
- Riihimäen kaupunki Riihimäki stad
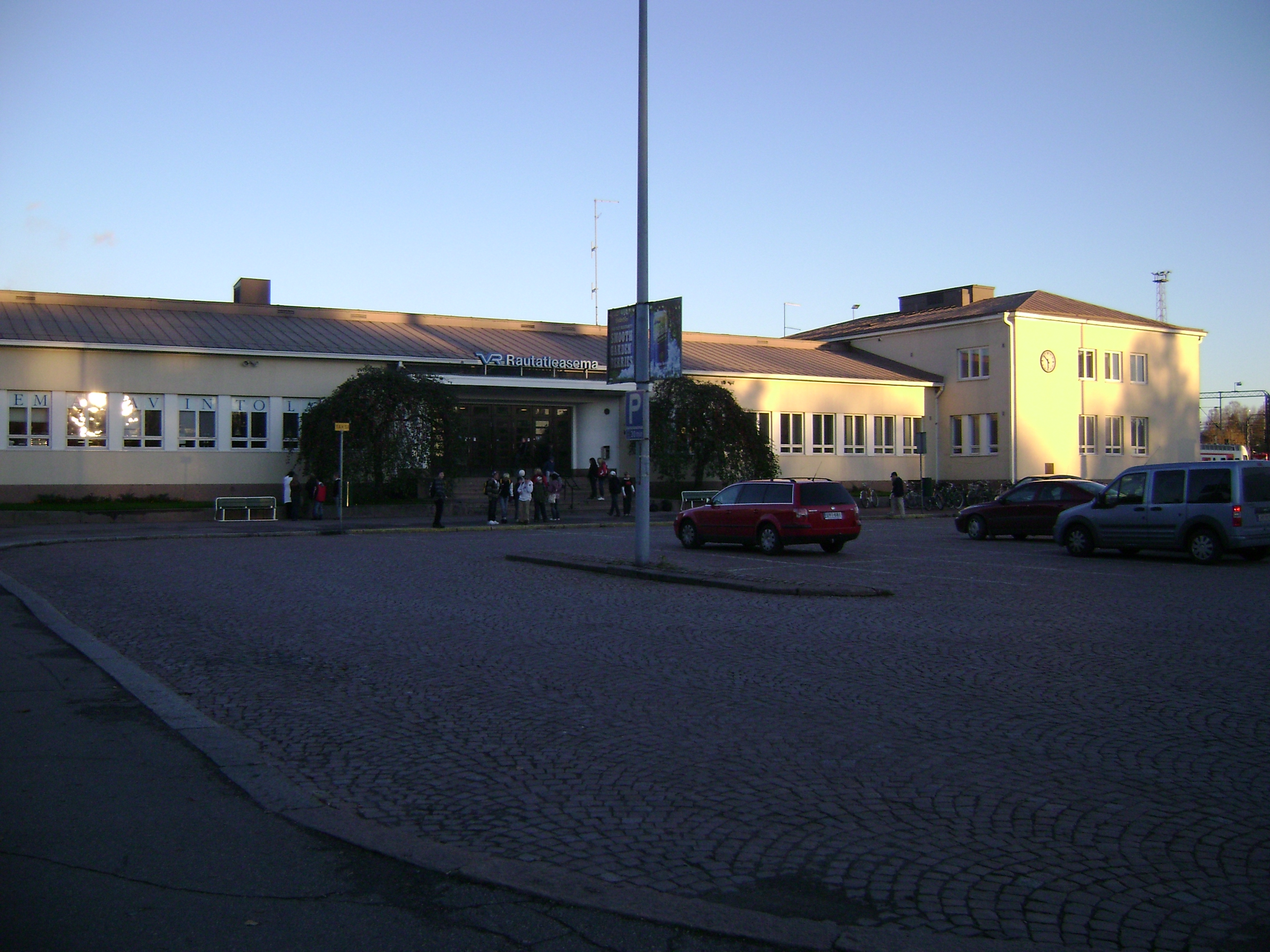
- Riihimäki railway station

- Coat of arms

- Location of Riihimäki in Finland
- Interactive map of Riihimäki
- Coordinates: 60°44′N 024°46′E
- Country: Finland
- Region: Kanta-Häme
- Sub-region: Riihimäki
- Charter: 1922
- City rights: 1960

Government
  - City manager: Jouni Eho

Area (2018-01-01)
  - Total: 125.56 km^{2} (48.48 sq mi)
  - Land: 121.01 km^{2} (46.72 sq mi)
  - Water: 4.54 km^{2} (1.75 sq mi)
  - Rank: 290th largest in Finland

Population (2025-12-31)
  - Total: 28,555
  - Rank: 38th largest in Finland
  - Density: 235.97/km^{2} (611.2/sq mi)

Population by native language
  - Finnish: 91.2% (official)
  - Swedish: 0.4%
  - Others: 8.4%

Population by age
  - 0 to 14: 15.4%
  - 15 to 64: 61.8%
  - 65 or older: 22.8%
- Time zone: UTC+02:00 (EET)
  - Summer (DST): UTC+03:00 (EEST)
- Website: www.riihimaki.fi/en/

Riihimäki (Finnish pronunciation: [ˈriːhiˌmæki]; lit. 'grain drying cabin hill') is a town and municipality in the south of Finland, about 69 kilometres (43 mi) north of Helsinki and 109 kilometres (68 miles) southeast of Tampere. An important railway junction is located in Riihimäki, since railway tracks from Riihimäki lead to Helsinki, Tampere and Lahti.

The town is located in the province of Southern Finland and is part of the Kanta-Häme region. Its neighboring municipalities are Janakkala in the north, Hausjärvi in the east, Hyvinkää in the south and Loppi in the west. The town has a population of 28,555 (31 December 2025) and covers an area of 125.56 square kilometres (48.48 sq mi) of which 4.54 km^{2} (1.75 sq mi) is water. The population density is 235.97 inhabitants per square kilometre (611.2/sq mi). The municipality is unilingually Finnish.

Riihimäki is home to the Riihimäki Prison, which is, alongside Turku Prison, one of the prisons in the country with the highest security rating (A+), and is home to the country's most dangerous prisoners. Several businesses also operate in Riihimäki. Notably, Würth Oy has its Finnish headquarters and logistics center in Riihimäki. Valio has a major dairy in the Herajoki part of Riihimäki. The famous Sako rifles are also produced in Riihimäki.

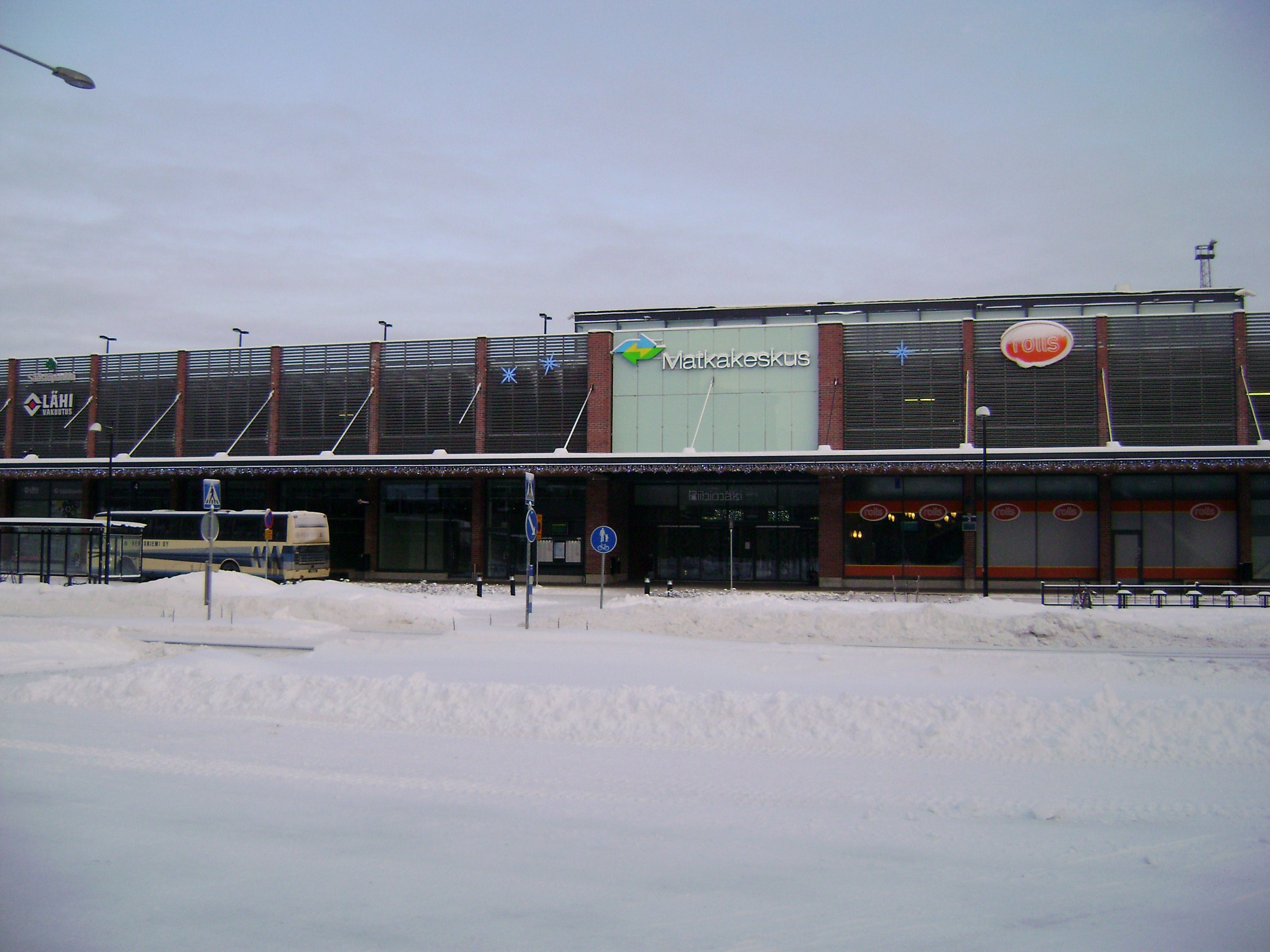
Travel Centre

In March 2026, Minister of Defence Antti Häkkänen decided that a NATO's Deployable CIS Module (DMC) will be established in Riihimäki. The DMC is scheduled to start operations in early 2027.

== History ==
Riihimäki was established around the Riihimäki railway station by the Helsinki–Riihimäki railway and is one of the original stations on Finland's first railway between Helsinki and Hämeenlinna, which opened in 1862. It became the first railway junction in Finland when the Riihimäki – Saint Petersburg track's first section from Riihimäki to Lahti was opened in 1869. In 1907-1952 a narrow-gauge railway also operated between Riihimäki and Loppi. Today, the quickest way to travel between Riihimäki and Loppi is by car along the national road 54, which runs between Tammela and Hollola.

In 1910, a cavalry regiment was also established in the city. In 1944, the Signal Regiment was moved to the Riihimäki garrison.

In 1922, Riihimäki separated from Hausjärvi and became an independent market-town. Riihimäki got its city rights in 1960. It was home to the reputed Riihimäki Glass company that remained in business from 1910 through 1990.

The Finnish Glass Museum with its permanent display created by famous designer Tapio Wirkkala was opened in 1981.

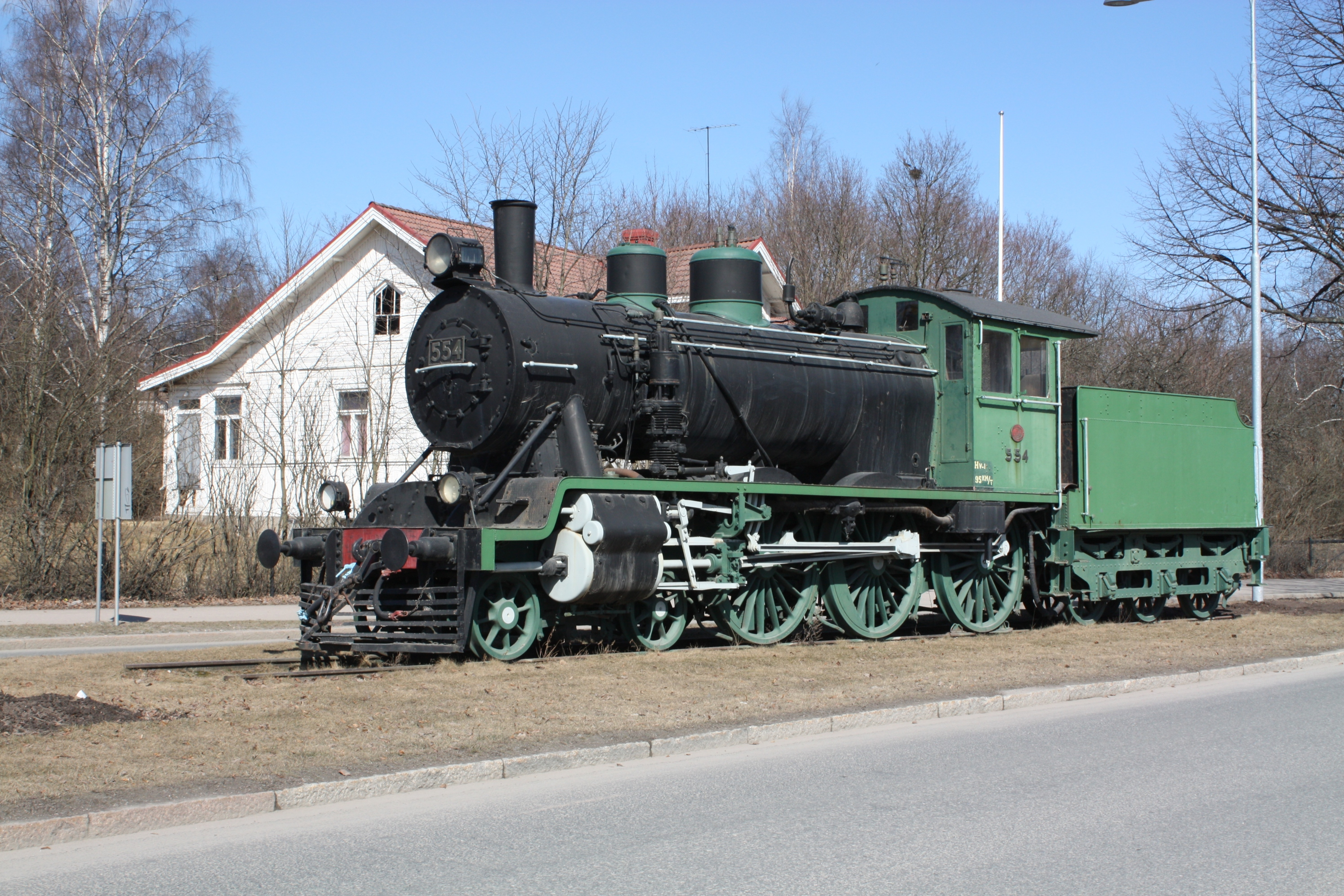
A VR Class Hv1 steam locomotive#554 'Heikki' near Riihimäki Railway Station

== Demographics ==
Population size 1990–2025
Year	Population
1990	25,000
1995	25,838
2000	26,173
2005	27,069
2010	28,803
2015	29,269
2020	28,710
2025	28,555

== Sports ==
- Peltosaaren Nikkarit & Kiekko-Nikkarit (Ice hockey)
- Riihimäen Taitoluistelijat (Figure skating)
- Riihimäen Jäätaiturit (Synchronized skating)
- Kolmoskori (Basketball)
- Riihimäen Ilves, formerly RIPS (Soccer)
- SC Top (Floorball)
- Cocks (Handball)
- Riihi-Pesis, formerly Riihimäen Pallonlyöjät (Finnish baseball)
- Riihimäen Kisko (Athletics)
- Riihimäen Uimaseura (Swimming)

== Notable individuals ==
=== Athletes ===
- Aki Seitsonen, ice hockey player
- Arri Munnukka, football player
- Daniel O'Shaughnessy, football player
- Janne Lahti, SM-Liiga ice hockey player
- Jukka Jalonen, national ice hockey coach and ice hockey player
- Jukka Vanninen, football player
- Jussi Veikkanen, professional road racing cyclist
- Kari Tiainen, motorcycle enduro world champion
- Kasper Kenig, ice hockey player
- Lauri Toivonen, basketball player
- Max Kenig, ice hockey player
- Olli Korkeavuori, ice hockey player
- Patrick O'Shaughnessy, football player
- Pekka Vasala, middle and long-distance runner; Olympic champion (1972) in the 1,500 metres
- Sami Lähteenmäki, SM-Liiga ice hockey player
- Tero Arkiomaa, ice hockey player
- Tuomas Viertola, basketball player
- Sanni Franssi, football player

=== Politicians ===
- Aino-Kaisa Pekonen, Member of Parliament
- Arto Lapiolahti, Member of Parliament
- Efraim Kronqvist, politician and Riihimäki Red Guard leader in 1918
- Helge Sirén, Member of Parliament
- Iiro Viinanen, politician
- Päivi Räsänen, politician

=== The arts ===
- Liisa Akimof, musician
- Pekka Autiovuori, actor
- Torsten Brander, music contributor
- Tommi Hakala, singer
- Renny Harlin, film director and film producer
- Aku Hirviniemi, actor
- Anita Hirvonen, pop singer
- Fredi (singer), musician
- Maija Isola, designer
- Erkki Junkkarinen, singer
- Janne Kataja, actor
- Jukka Koskinen, musician
- Jukka Kuronen, Finnish drag artist
- Niina Lahtinen, actor
- Sinikka Laine, writer
- Emilia Linnavuori, visual artist
- Reko Lundan, author and playwright
- Jarkko Martikainen, singer and songwriter
- Nest, music group
- Tuomari Nurmio, singer and songwriter
- Lauren Okadigbo, actress
- Samuli Paronen, writer
- Veikko Sinisalo, actor
- Skepticism, music group
- Seppo Tamminen, artist
- Jann Wilde, musician and songwriter
- Lauri Bagge, musician and composer

=== Other ===
- Arvi Paloheimo, industrialist
- Olli Paloheimo, forester, minister and Jäger
- Ragnar Granit, physician who won the 1967 Nobel Prize in Physiology and Medicine
- Maija Isola, textile designer
- Veikko Löyttyniemi, journalist

== Twin towns – sister cities ==
Riihimäki is twinned with:

- Szolnok, Hungary
- Lillestrøm, Norway
- Húsavík, Iceland
- Gus-Khrustalny, Russia
- Karlskoga, Sweden
- Aalborg, Denmark
- Bad Segeberg, Germany
