= Pesonen =

- Language: Finnish

Origin
- Derivation: Peso + nen

Pesonen is a Finnish surname. Notable people with the surname include:

- Matti Pesonen (1868–1957), Finnish educationist and politician
- Otto Pesonen (1868–1936), Finnish farmer and politician
- Emil Pesonen (1883–1958), Finnish farmer and politician
- Armas Pesonen (1885–1947), Finnish javelin thrower
- Aarno Pesonen (1886–1927), Finnish educationist and politician
- Yrjö Pesonen (1888–1966), Finnish farmer, journalist, insurance executive and politician
- Heikki Pesonen (1895–1964), Finnish politician
- Edvard Pesonen (1904–1977), Finnish politician
- Dick Pesonen (born 1938), American football player
- Pentti Pesonen (1938–2024), Finnish cross country skier
- Martti Pesonen, Finnish Grand Prix motorcycle road racer
- Jussi Pesonen (born 1979), Finnish ice hockey player
- Janne Pesonen (born 1982), Finnish ice hockey player
- Saku Pesonen (born 1985), Finnish football player
- Harri Pesonen (born 1988), Finnish ice hockey player
- Anssi Pesonen (born 1990), Finnish ice hockey goaltender
- Lari Pesonen (born 1995), Finnish sport shooter
