= Järvelä, Kärkölä =

Järvelä
- Village
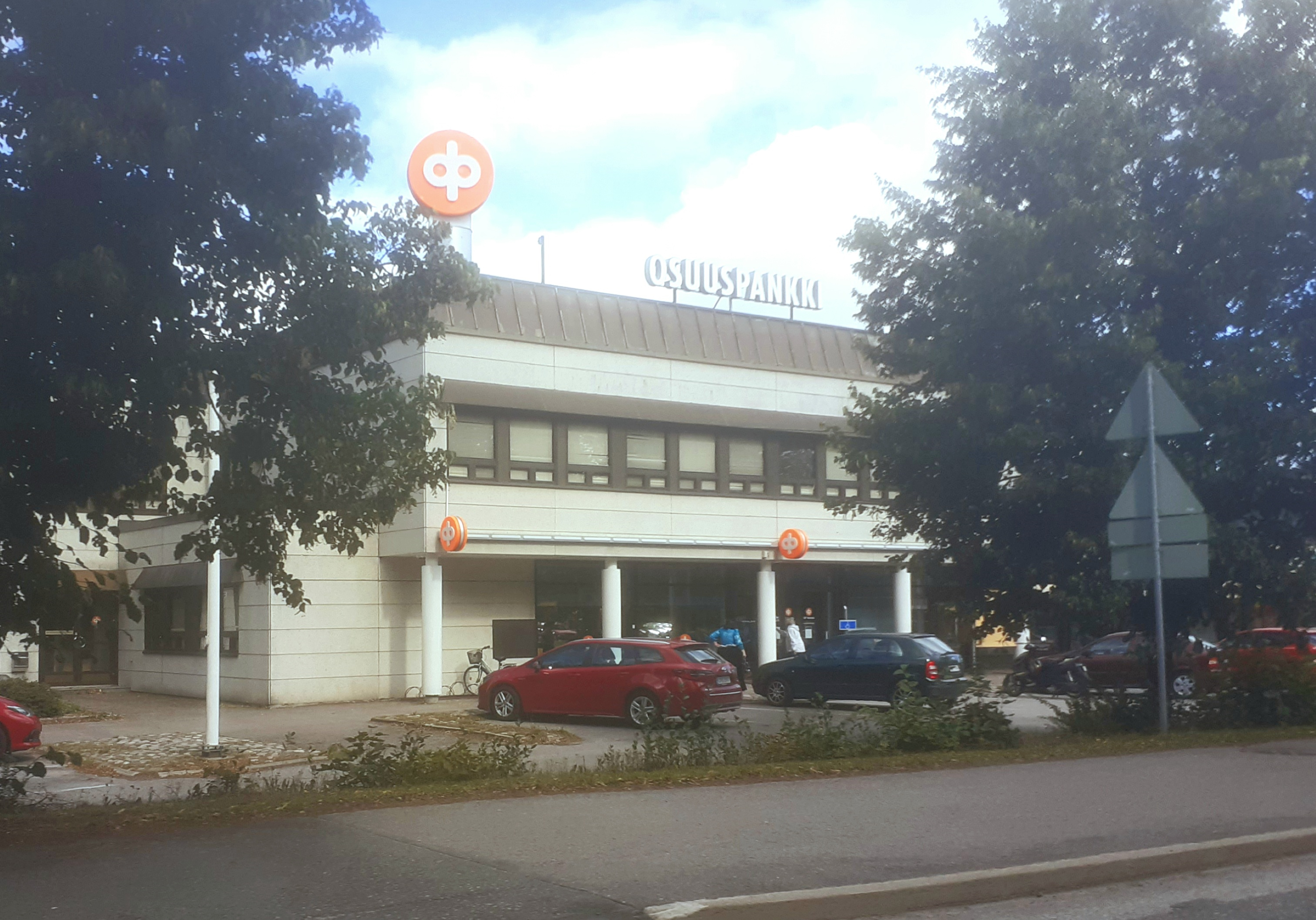
- Järvelä's Osuuspankki bank office in 2022

- Location in Finland
- Coordinates: 60°52.484′N 25°16.228′E
- Country: Finland
- Region: Päijät-Häme
- Municipality: Kärkölä
- Time zone: UTC+2 (EET)
  - Summer (DST): UTC+3 (EEST)

Järvelä (Finnish pronunciation: [ˈjærʋelæ]) is the largest village in the Kärkölä municipality and the municipality's administrative center in Päijät-Häme, Finland. At the end of 2014, about 2,800 inhabitants lived there. As a statistical agglomeration defined by Statistics Finland, Järvelä also covers the church village of Kärkölä. Järvelä is located along the railway between Lahti and Riihimäki and by road at the intersection of main road 54 and regional road 295. All commuter trains between Lahti and Riihimäki stop at Järvelä railway station.

In addition to settlement, there are many different companies in the area, such as grocery stores, filling station, hardware store, pharmacy, Alko store, restaurants, Järvelän Kino cinema, post office, bank and car repair shops. Municipal services operating in Järvelä include a primary school, a library, a kindergarten, a youth center, a health center and an indoor swimming pool. Kärkölä High School, which operated in Järvelä, ceased operations in 2015 due to the small number of students, which is why the nearest high school is now located in the region of Kanta-Häme in Hausjärvi's Oitti.

== See also ==
- Järvelä railway station
- Kausala, a village in Iitti, Päijät-Häme
- Lappila
