= Ryttylä railway station =

Railway station in Hausjärvi, Finland

Ryttylä
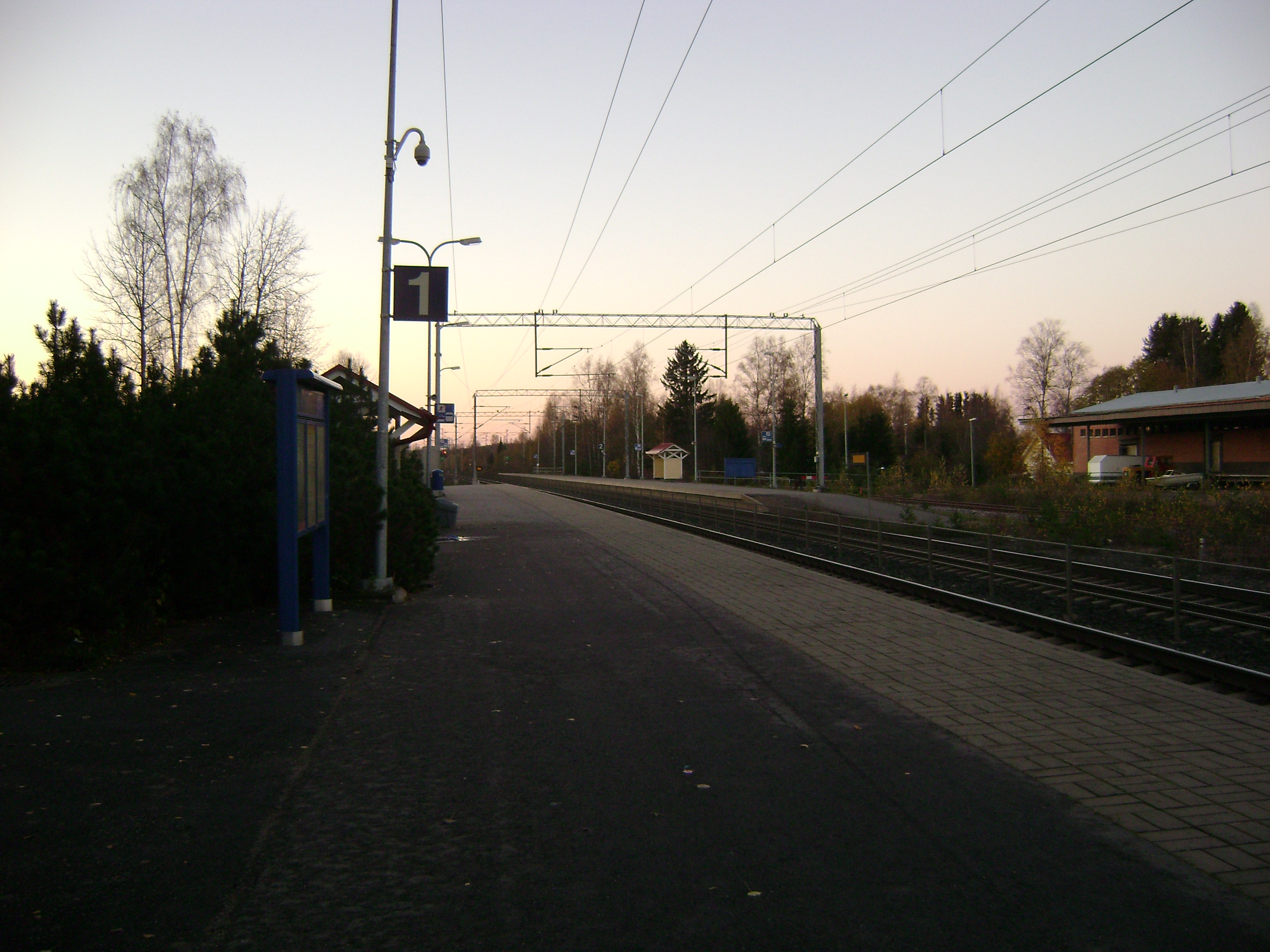

General information
- Location: Mäkitie 4, 12310; Ryttylä, Hausjärvi; Finland
- Coordinates: 60°49′3″N 024°45′27″E
- System: VR station
- Owner: Finnish Transport Infrastructure Agency
- Operator: VR Group
- Line: Riihimäki–Tampere railway
- Platforms: 2 side platforms
- Tracks: 4

Other information
- Station code: Ry

History
- Opened: 1863; 163 years ago

Passengers
- 2008: 31,000

Services
Preceding station	VR commuter rail	Following station
Riihimäki towards Helsinki	R	Turenki towards Tampere
Riihimäki towards Helsinki	D	Turenki towards Tampere
Location
- Location within Kanta-Häme

The Ryttylä railway station (Finnish: Ryttylän rautatieasema, Swedish: Ryttylä järnvägsstation) is located in the municipality of Hausjärvi, Finland, in the village and urban area of Ryttylä. It is located along the Riihimäki–Tampere railway, and its neighboring stations are Turenki in the north and Riihimäki in the south.

== History ==
It was not originally planned to place a station in northern Hausjärvi upon the construction of the Helsinki–Hämeenlinna railway; however, presumably from the initiative of the Granfelt family, the owners of the estate of Ryttylä, a station was eventually established in 1863. A residential building designed by Knut Nylander eventually became the main station building in 1876. A new station building, once again designed by Nylander, was finished in 1900, and it served the station until 1973; upon its demolition, the former building of the station chief was used.

The station enabled growth in Ryttylä, and it became site to various industries, including a brick factory. Ryttylä's population was 1,300 in 1960, though its growth has diminished since, and it was instead Oitti that became the largest and most important urban area of Hausjärvi, similarly aided by its station along the Riihimäki–Saint Petersburg railway. Ryttylä was home to 1,628 people in 2018.

Passenger services in Ryttylä were briefly suspended as of 1981; however, trains once again began to call at the station in 1982. Ryttylä was made an unstaffed station in 1983.

== Services and departure tracks ==
Ryttylä is served by VR commuter rail lines R and D on the route Helsinki–Riihimäki–Hämeenlinna–Tampere. Southbound trains toward Riihimäki and Helsinki use track 1, while northbound trains toward Hämeenlinna and Tampere use track 2.
