= March 12 =

March 12 this year in various calendars
- Thursday, 12 March 2026
Akan	Foyaw
Armenian	25 Areg 1475
Aztec	Huei Tecuilhuitl 1, 10 Ātl
Babylonian	22 Shabatu, 2336 SE
Balinese pawukon	Luang, Pepet, Pasah, Sri, Pon, Tungleh, Wraspati of Wayang, Sri, Nohan, Manuh
Bengali	27 Falgun, BS 1432
Chinese	Yin Wood Rooster・Dipper Mansion; Fire Horse Year, Month 1, Day 24 (Jingzhe, 8 days until Chunfen)
Common Era	12 March 2026 CE
Coptic	3 Paremhat, AM 1742
Egyptian	30 Epiphi, 2774 NE
Ethiopian	3 Magābit, 2018 Amätä Məhrät
French Republican	Décade III, Duodi de Ventôse de l'Année 234 de la République
Gregorian	12 March, AD 2026
Hebrew	23 Adar, AM 5786
Hindu	Mūla・Siddhi; Solar: 28 Phālguna, 1947 SE; Lunisolar: Navamī, Kṛishna pakṣa of Phālguna, 2082 VE; Rāudra・5126 KY・1,872,646
Icelandic	Fimmtudagur, 19 Góa 2025
Islamic	23 Ramadan, AH 1447 (using tabular method)
ISO week date	2026-W11-4
Japanese	24 Mutsuki, Reiwa 8 (Keichitsu, 8 days until Shunbun)
Julian	27 February, AD 2026 (AM 7534)
Julian day	2461112
Korean	24 Horangidal, 4359 DE
Maya	13.0.13.7.9; 7 Cumku, 10 Muluc
Roman	ante diem III Kalendas Martias, MMDCCLXXIX AUC
Solar Hijri	21 Esfand, SH 1404
Tibetan	24 mchu, me pho rta 2153 or 1772 or 1000

<<	March					>>
Su	Mo	Tu	We	Th	Fr	Sa
1	2	3	4	5	6	7
8	9	10	11	12	13	14
15	16	17	18	19	20	21
22	23	24	25	26	27	28
29	30	31
2026

March 12 in recent years
2026 (Thursday)
2025 (Wednesday)
2024 (Tuesday)
2023 (Sunday)
2022 (Saturday)
2021 (Friday)
2020 (Thursday)
2019 (Tuesday)
2018 (Monday)
2017 (Sunday)

March 12 is the 71st day of the year (72nd in leap years) in the Gregorian calendar; 294 days remain until the end of the year.

== Events ==
=== Pre-1600 ===
- 538 – Vitiges, king of the Ostrogoths, ends his siege of Rome and retreats to Ravenna, leaving the city to the victorious Byzantine general, Belisarius.
- 1088 – Election of Urban II as the 159th Pope of the Catholic Church. He is best known for initiating the Crusades.
- 1158 – German city Munich (München) is first mentioned as forum apud Munichen in the Augsburg arbitration by Holy Roman Emperor Friedrich I.
- 1391 – Konrad von Wallenrode is elected the 24th Grand Master of the Teutonic Order (date is O.S.).
- 1579 – Start of the Siege of Maastricht, part of the Eighty Years' War.

=== 1601–1900 ===
- 1622 – Ignatius of Loyola and Francis Xavier, founders of the Society of Jesus, are canonized by the Roman Catholic Church.
- 1689 – James II of England lands at Kinsale, starting the Williamite War in Ireland.
- 1811 – Peninsular War: A day after a successful rearguard action, French Marshal Michel Ney once again successfully delays the pursuing Anglo-Portuguese force at the Battle of Redinha.
- 1862 – Paddle steamer Brother Jonathan docks in Fort Victoria (now Victoria, British Columbia), carrying smallpox-infected passengers from San Francisco. The ensuing epidemic killed an estimated two-thirds of First Nations in the province of British Columbia.

=== 1901–present ===
- 1912 – The Girl Guides (later renamed the Girl Scouts of the USA) are founded in the United States.
- 1913 – The future capital of Australia is officially named Canberra.
- 1918 – Moscow becomes the capital of Russia again after Saint Petersburg held this status for most of the period since 1713.
- 1920 – The Kapp Putsch begins when the Marinebrigade Ehrhardt is ordered to march on Berlin.
- 1928 – In California, the St. Francis Dam fails; the resulting floods kill 431 people.
- 1930 – Mahatma Gandhi begins the Salt March, a 200-mile (320 km) march to the sea to protest the British monopoly on salt in India.
- 1933 – Great Depression: Franklin D. Roosevelt addresses the nation for the first time as President of the United States. This is also the first of his "fireside chats".
- 1938 – Anschluss: German troops occupy and annex Austria.
- 1940 – Winter War: Finland signs the Moscow Peace Treaty with the Soviet Union, ceding almost all of Finnish Karelia.
- 1940 – The most destructive train accident in Finnish history kills 39 and injures 69 people in Turenki, Janakkala.
- 1942 – The Battle of Java ends with the surrender of the American-British-Dutch-Australian Command to the Empire of Japan in Bandung, West Java, Dutch East Indies.
- 1947 – Cold War: The Truman Doctrine is proclaimed to help stem the spread of Communism.
- 1950 – The Llandow air disaster kills 80 people when the aircraft they are travelling in crashes near Sigingstone, Wales. At the time this was the world's deadliest air disaster.
- 1967 – Suharto takes power from Sukarno when the Provisional People's Consultative Assembly inaugurate him as Acting President of Indonesia.
- 1968 – Mauritius gains independence from the United Kingdom.
- 1971 – The 1971 Turkish military memorandum is sent to the Süleyman Demirel government of Turkey and the government resigns.
- 1989 – Tim Berners-Lee submits his proposal to CERN for an information management system, which subsequently develops into the World Wide Web.
- 1992 – Mauritius becomes a republic while remaining a member of the Commonwealth of Nations.
- 1993 – Several bombs explode in Mumbai, India, killing about 300 people and injuring hundreds more.
- 1993 – North Korea announces that it will withdraw from the Treaty on the Non-Proliferation of Nuclear Weapons and refuses to allow inspectors access to its nuclear sites.
- 1999 – Former Warsaw Pact members the Czech Republic, Hungary and Poland join NATO.
- 2003 – Zoran Đinđić, Prime Minister of Serbia, is assassinated in Belgrade.
- 2003 – The World Health Organization officially release a global warning of outbreaks of Severe acute respiratory syndrome (SARS).
- 2004 – President of South Korea, Roh Moo-hyun, is impeached by its National Assembly, the first such impeachment in the nation's history.
- 2006 – In Mahmoudiyah, Iraq, 14-year-old Abeer Qassim Hamza al-Janabi is raped and murdered by five American soldiers of the 502nd Infantry Regiment, who also murder both of her parents and her sister.
- 2009 – Financier Bernie Madoff pleads guilty to one of the largest frauds in Wall Street's history.
- 2011 – A reactor at the Fukushima Daiichi Nuclear Power Plant explodes and releases radioactivity into the atmosphere a day after the 2011 Tōhoku earthquake and tsunami.
- 2014 – A gas explosion in the New York City neighborhood of East Harlem kills eight and injures 70 others.
- 2018 – US-Bangla Airlines Flight 211 crashes at Tribhuvan International Airport in Katmandu, killing 51 and injuring 20.
- 2019 – In the House of Commons, the revised EU Withdrawal Bill was rejected by a margin of 149 votes.
- 2020 – The United States suspends travel from Europe due to the COVID-19 pandemic.

== Births ==
=== Pre-1600 ===
- 1270 – Charles, Count of Valois (died 1325)
- 1515 – Caspar Othmayr, German Lutheran pastor and composer (died 1553)

=== 1601–1900 ===
- 1607 – Paul Gerhardt, German poet and composer (died 1676)
- 1613 – André Le Nôtre, French gardener and architect (died 1700)
- 1626 – John Aubrey, English historian and philosopher (died 1697)
- 1637 – Anne Hyde, Duchess of York and Albany (died 1671)
- 1672 – Richard Steele, Irish-Welsh journalist and politician (died 1729)
- 1685 – George Berkeley, Irish bishop and philosopher (died 1753)
- 1710 – Thomas Arne, English composer (died 1778)
- 1735 – François-Emmanuel Guignard, comte de Saint-Priest, French politician and diplomat (died 1821)
- 1753 – Jean Denis, French politician, lawyer, jurist, journalist, and historian (died 1827)
- 1766 – Claudius Buchanan, Scottish theologian (died 1815)
- 1781 – Frederica of Baden, Queen consort to Gustav IV Adolf of Sweden (died 1826)
- 1784 – William Buckland, English geologist and paleontologist; Dean of Westminster (died 1856)
- 1795 – William Lyon Mackenzie, Scottish-Canadian journalist and politician, 1st Mayor of Toronto (died 1861)
- 1795 – George Tyler Wood, American military officer and politician (died 1858)
- 1806 – Jane Pierce, American wife of Franklin Pierce, 15th First Lady of the United States (died 1863)
- 1807 – James Abbott, Indian Army officer (died 1896)
- 1815 – Louis-Jules Trochu, French military leader and politician (died 1896)
- 1821 – John Abbott, Canadian lawyer and politician, 3rd Prime Minister of Canada (died 1893)
- 1821 – Medo Pucić, Croatian writer and politician (died 1882)
- 1823 – Katsu Kaishū, Japanese statesman (died 1899)
- 1824 – Gustav Kirchhoff, Russian-German physicist and academic (died 1887)
- 1832 – Charles Boycott, English farmer and agent (died 1897)
- 1834 – Hilary A. Herbert, American politician, Secretary of the Navy (died 1919)
- 1835 – Simon Newcomb, Canadian-American astronomer and mathematician (died 1909)
- 1835 – Sigismondo Savona, Maltese educator and politician (died 1908)
- 1837 – Alexandre Guilmant, French organist and composer (died 1911)
- 1838 – William Henry Perkin, English chemist and academic (died 1907)
- 1843 – Gabriel Tarde, French sociologist and criminologist (died 1904)
- 1855 – Eduard Birnbaum, Polish-born German cantor (died 1920)
- 1857 – William V. Ranous, American actor and director (died 1915)
- 1858 – Adolph Ochs, American publisher (died 1935)
- 1859 – Ernesto Cesàro, Italian mathematician (died 1906)
- 1860 – Eric Stenbock, Estonian poet and author (died 1895)
- 1863 – Gabriele D'Annunzio, Italian soldier, journalist, poet, and playwright (died 1938)
- 1863 – Vladimir Vernadsky, Russian and Ukrainian mineralogist and chemist (died 1945)
- 1864 – W. H. R. Rivers, English anthropologist, neurologist, ethnologist, and psychiatrist (died 1922)
- 1864 – Alice Tegnér, Swedish organist, composer, and educator (died 1943)
- 1868 – Mary Karadja, Swedish writer, spiritualist and princess (died 1943)
- 1869 – George Forbes, New Zealand politician, 22nd Prime Minister of New Zealand (died 1947)
- 1874 – Edmund Eysler, Austrian composer (died 1949)
- 1877 – Wilhelm Frick, German lawyer and politician, German Federal Minister of the Interior (died 1946)
- 1878 – Gemma Galgani, Italian mystic and saint (died 1903)
- 1880 – Henry Drysdale Dakin, English-American chemist and academic (died 1952)
- 1881 – Väinö Tanner, Finnish politician of Social Democratic Party of Finland; the Prime Minister of Finland (died 1966)
- 1882 – Carlos Blanco Galindo, Bolivian politician (died 1943)
- 1883 – Sándor Jávorka, Hungarian botanist (died 1961)
- 1888 – Walter Hermann Bucher, German-American geologist and paleontologist (died 1965)
- 1888 – Hans Knappertsbusch, German conductor (died 1965)
- 1890 – Evert Taube, Swedish singer-songwriter and lute player (died 1976)
- 1896 – Jesse Fuller, American singer-songwriter and musician (died 1976)
- 1898 – Tian Han, Chinese playwright (died 1968)
- 1898 – Luitpold Steidle, German army officer and politician (died 1984)
- 1899 – Ramón Muttis, Argentine footballer (died 1955)
- 1900 – Rinus van den Berge, Dutch athlete (died 1972)
- 1900 – Sylvi Kekkonen, Finnish writer and wife of President of Finland Urho Kekkonen (died 1974)
- 1900 – Gustavo Rojas Pinilla, 19th President of Colombia (died 1975)

=== 1901–present ===
- 1904 – Lyudmila Keldysh, Russian mathematician (died 1976)
- 1905 – Takashi Shimura, Japanese actor (died 1982)
- 1907 – Dorrit Hoffleit, American astronomer and academic (died 2007)
- 1908 – Rita Angus, New Zealand painter (died 1970)
- 1908 – David Marshall, Singaporean lawyer and politician, 1st Chief Minister of Singapore (died 1995)
- 1909 – Petras Cvirka, Lithuanian author (died 1947)
- 1910 – László Lékai, Archbishop of Esztergom and Cardinal (died 1986)
- 1910 – Masayoshi Ōhira, Japanese politician, 68th Prime Minister of Japan (died 1980)
- 1911 – Gustavo Díaz Ordaz, Mexican academic and politician, 49th President of Mexico (died 1979)
- 1912 – Willie Hall, English footballer (died 1967)
- 1912 – Irving Layton, Romanian-Canadian poet and academic (died 2006)
- 1913 – Yashwantrao Chavan, Indian politician, 5th Deputy Prime Minister of India (died 1984)
- 1913 – Agathe von Trapp, Hungarian-American singer and author (died 2010)
- 1915 – Alberto Burri, Italian painter and sculptor (died 1995)
- 1915 – Jiří Mucha, Czech journalist (died 1991)
- 1917 – Leonard Chess, American record company executive, co-founder of Chess Records (died 1969)
- 1917 – Millard Kaufman, American author and screenwriter (died 2009)
- 1917 – Googie Withers, Indian-Australian actress (died 2011)
- 1918 – Elaine de Kooning, American painter and academic (died 1989)
- 1918 – Pádraig Faulkner, Irish Fianna Fáil politician (died 2012)
- 1921 – Gianni Agnelli, Italian businessman (died 2001)
- 1921 – Gordon MacRae, American actor and singer (died 1986)
- 1922 – Jack Kerouac, American author and poet (died 1969)
- 1922 – Lane Kirkland, American sailor and union leader (died 1999)
- 1923 – Hjalmar Andersen, Norwegian speed skater and cyclist (died 2013)
- 1923 – Norbert Brainin, Austrian violinist (died 2005)
- 1923 – Wally Schirra, American captain, pilot, and astronaut (died 2007)
- 1923 – Mae Young, American wrestler (died 2014)
- 1925 – Leo Esaki, Japanese physicist and academic, Nobel Prize laureate
- 1925 – Harry Harrison, American author and illustrator (died 2012)
- 1926 – George Ariyoshi, American lawyer and politician, 3rd Governor of Hawaii (died 2026)
- 1926 – Arthur A. Hartman, American career diplomat (died 2015)
- 1926 – John Clellon Holmes, American author and professor (died 1988)
- 1926 – David Nadien, American violinist (died 2014)
- 1927 – Raúl Alfonsín, Argentine lawyer and politician, 46th President of Argentina (died 2009)
- 1927 – Emmett Leith, American professor of electrical engineering and co-inventor of three-dimensional holography (died 2005)
- 1927 – Sudharmono, Indonesian politician, 5th Vice President of Indonesia (died 2006)
- 1928 – Edward Albee, American director and playwright (died 2016)
- 1929 – Win Tin, Burmese journalist and politician, co-founded the National League for Democracy (died 2014)
- 1930 – Antony Acland, English former diplomat and Provost of Eton College (died 2021)
- 1930 – Vern Law, American baseball player and manager
- 1931 – Józef Tischner, Polish priest and philosopher (died 2000)
- 1932 – Bob Houbregs, Canadian basketball player (died 2014)
- 1932 – Andrew Young, American pastor, civil rights movement activist, politician, and 14th United States Ambassador to the United Nations
- 1933 – Myrna Fahey, American actress (died 1973)
- 1933 – Barbara Feldon, American actress
- 1934 – Francisco J. Ayala, Spanish-American evolutionary biologist and philosopher (died 2023)
- 1935 – Chiam See Tong, Singaporean lawyer and politician
- 1936 – Virginia Hamilton, American children's books author (died 2002)
- 1936 – Michał Heller, Polish professor of philosophy
- 1936 – Eddie Sutton, American basketball player and coach (died 2020)
- 1937 – Zoltán Horvath, Hungarian sabre fencer
- 1937 – Zurab Sotkilava, Georgian operatic tenor (died 2017)
- 1938 – Vladimir Msryan, Armenian actor (died 2010)
- 1938 – Johnny Rutherford, American race car driver and sportscaster
- 1938 – Ken Spears, American writer (died 2020)
- 1938 – Juan Horacio Suárez, Argentine bishop
- 1938 – Ron Tutt, American drummer (died 2021)
- 1940 – Al Jarreau, American singer (died 2017)
- 1941 – Josip Skoblar, former Croatian footballer
- 1942 – Jimmy Wynn, American baseball player (died 2020)
- 1943 – Ratko Mladić, Bosnian Serb military officer and war criminal (died 2026)
- 1944 – Erwin Mueller, former American basketball player (died 2018)
- 1945 – Anne Summers, Australian feminist writer, editor, publisher and public servant
- 1946 – Dean Cundey, American cinematographer and film director
- 1946 – Liza Minnelli, American actress, singer and dancer
- 1946 – Frank Welker, American voice actor and singer
- 1947 – Peter Harry Carstensen, German educator and politician
- 1947 – Jan-Erik Enestam, Finland-Swedish politician
- 1947 – David Rigert, Soviet Olympic weightlifter
- 1947 – Mitt Romney, American businessman and politician, 70th Governor of Massachusetts
- 1948 – Virginia Bottomley, Scottish social worker and politician, Secretary of State for Culture, Media and Sport
- 1948 – Kent Conrad, American politician
- 1948 – James Taylor, American singer-songwriter and guitarist
- 1949 – Rob Cohen, American director, producer, and screenwriter
- 1949 – Mary Catherine Lamb, American textile artist
- 1949 – David Mellor, British politician
- 1950 – Javier Clemente, Spanish footballer and manager
- 1952 – André Comte-Sponville, French philosopher
- 1952 – John Mitchell, English footballer
- 1952 – Yasuhiko Okudera, former Japanese footballer
- 1953 – Pavel Pinigin, former Soviet wrestler and Olympic champion
- 1954 – Anish Kapoor, Indian-English sculptor
- 1956 – Ove Aunli, former Norwegian cross-country skier
- 1956 – Stanisław Bobak, Polish ski jumper (died 2010)
- 1956 – Steve Harris, English bass player and songwriter
- 1956 – Lesley Manville, English actress
- 1956 – Dale Murphy, American baseball player
- 1956 – Pim Verbeek, Dutch football manager (died 2019)
- 1957 – Patrick Battiston, French footballer and coach
- 1957 – Marlon Jackson, American singer-songwriter and dancer
- 1957 – Andrey Lopatov, Soviet basketball player (died 2022)
- 1958 – Phil Anderson, English-Australian cyclist
- 1959 – Milorad Dodik, Bosnian Serb politician and president of Republika Srpska
- 1959 – Luenell, American comedian and actress
- 1959 – Michael Walter, German luger (died 2016)
- 1960 – Jason Beghe, American actor
- 1960 – Courtney B. Vance, American actor and painter
- 1962 – Julia Campbell, American actress
- 1962 – Andreas Köpke, German footballer
- 1962 – Chris Sanders, American illustrator and voice actor
- 1962 – Darryl Strawberry, American baseball player and minister
- 1962 – Titus Welliver, American actor
- 1963 – John Andretti, American race car driver (died 2020)
- 1963 – Candy Costie, American swimmer
- 1963 – Joaquim Cruz, Brazilian runner and coach
- 1963 – Reiner Gies, German boxer
- 1963 – Ian Holloway, English footballer and manager
- 1963 – Paul Way, English golfer
- 1963 – Jake Weber, English actor
- 1964 – Dieter Eckstein, German footballer
- 1964 – Umirzak Shukeyev, Kazakh chairman of Samruk-Kazyna
- 1965 – Steve Finley, American baseball player
- 1965 – Ivari Padar, former Minister of Finance and Minister of Agriculture of the Estonian Social Democratic Party
- 1966 – David Daniels, American countertenor
- 1966 – Grant Long, American basketball player and sportscaster
- 1967 – Julio Dely Valdés, Panamanian footballer and manager
- 1968 – Tammy Duckworth, Thai-American colonel, pilot, and politician
- 1968 – Aaron Eckhart, American actor and producer
- 1969 – Graham Coxon, English singer-songwriter and guitarist
- 1969 – Jake Tapper, American journalist and author
- 1970 – Karen Bradley, English politician
- 1970 – Dave Eggers, American author and screenwriter
- 1970 – Mathias Grönberg, Swedish golfer
- 1970 – Rex Walters, American basketball player and coach
- 1971 – Raúl Mondesí, Dominican baseball player and politician
- 1971 – Isaiah Rider, American basketball player and rapper
- 1971 – Dragutin Topić, Serbian high jumper
- 1972 – Doron Sheffer, Israeli basketball player
- 1974 – Charles Akonnor, Ghanaian footballer
- 1974 – Walid Badir, Israeli footballer
- 1975 – Nicolae Grigore, Romanian footballer
- 1975 – Edgaras Jankauskas, Lithuanian footballer
- 1975 – Valérie Nicolas, French handball player
- 1975 – Srđan Pecelj, Bosnian footballer
- 1976 – Deron Quint, American ice hockey player
- 1976 – Zhao Wei, Chinese actress, film director, producer and pop singer
- 1977 – Michelle Burgher, track and field athlete
- 1977 – Ramiro Corrales, American soccer player
- 1977 – Amdy Faye, Senegalese footballer
- 1977 – Brent Johnson, American ice hockey player
- 1978 – Marco Ferreira, Portuguese footballer
- 1978 – Casey Mears, American race car driver
- 1978 – Arina Tanemura, Japanese author and illustrator
- 1979 – Charlie Bell, American basketball player and coach
- 1979 – Rhys Coiro, American actor
- 1979 – Pete Doherty, English musician, songwriter, actor, poet, writer, and artist
- 1979 – Jamie Dwyer, Australian field hockey player and coach
- 1979 – Gerard López, Spanish footballer
- 1979 – Ben Sandford, New Zealand skeleton racer
- 1979 – Edwin Villafuerte, Ecuadorian footballer
- 1979 – Tim Wieskötter, German sprint canoer
- 1980 – Césinha, Brazilian footballer
- 1980 – Becky Holliday, American pole vaulter
- 1980 – Jens Mouris, Dutch cyclist
- 1980 – Douglas Murray, Swedish ice hockey player
- 1981 – Kenta Kobayashi, Japanese wrestler and kick-boxer
- 1981 – Katarina Srebotnik, Slovenian tennis player
- 1981 – Holly Williams, American singer-songwriter and guitarist
- 1982 – Lili Bordán, Hungarian-American actress
- 1982 – Samm Levine, American actor and comedian
- 1982 – Ilya Nikulin, Russian ice hockey player
- 1982 – Hisato Satō, Japanese footballer
- 1982 – Yūto Satō, Japanese footballer
- 1982 – Tobias Schweinsteiger, German footballer
- 1983 – Atif Aslam, Pakistani singer and actor
- 1983 – Mikko Koivu, Finnish ice hockey player
- 1984 – Jaimie Alexander, American actress
- 1984 – Shreya Ghoshal, Indian singer
- 1985 – Marco Bonanomi, Italian racing driver
- 1985 – Aleksandr Bukharov, Russian footballer
- 1985 – Ed Clancy, English track and road cyclist
- 1986 – Martynas Andriuškevičius, Lithuanian basketball player
- 1986 – Oleh Dopilka, Ukrainian footballer
- 1986 – Danny Jones, English singer-songwriter, guitarist, and actor
- 1986 – Ben Offereins, Australian runner
- 1986 – František Rajtoral, Czech footballer (died 2017)
- 1987 – Manuele Boaro, Italian cyclist
- 1987 – Jessica Hardy, American swimmer
- 1987 – Maxwell Holt, American volleyball player
- 1987 – Teimour Radjabov, Azerbaijani chess player
- 1987 – Chris Seitz, American soccer player
- 1987 – Vadim Shipachyov, Russian ice hockey player
- 1987 – Pablo Velázquez, Paraguayan footballer
- 1987 – Kim Seon-tae, South Korean Youtuber
- 1988 – Sebastian Brendel, German canoe racer
- 1988 – Kostas Mitroglou, Greek footballer
- 1988 – Titi, Brazilian footballer
- 1989 – Jordan Adéoti, French footballer
- 1989 – Vytautas Černiauskas, Lithuanian footballer
- 1989 – Tyler Clary, American swimmer
- 1989 – Evgenii Dadonov, Russian ice hockey player
- 1989 – Richard Eckersley, English footballer
- 1989 – Chen Jianghua, Chinese basketball player
- 1989 – Dmitry Korobov, Belarusian ice hockey player
- 1989 – Siim Luts, Estonian footballer
- 1990 – Dont'a Hightower, American football coach and former player
- 1990 – Marvin Jones, American football player
- 1990 – Alexander Kröckel, German skeleton racer
- 1990 – Dawid Kubacki, Polish ski jumper
- 1990 – Irakli Kvekveskiri, Georgian footballer
- 1990 – Matias Myttynen, Finnish ice hockey player
- 1990 – Ilija Nestorovski, Macedonian footballer
- 1990 – Milena Raičević, Montenegrin handballer
- 1990 – Mikko Sumusalo, Finnish footballer
- 1991 – Leandro Fernandez, Argentine footballer
- 1991 – Felix Kroos, German footballer
- 1992 – Daniele Baselli, Italian footballer
- 1992 – Jordan Ferri, French footballer
- 1992 – Ciara Mageean, Irish middle-distance runner (died 2026)
- 1992 – Jiří Skalák, Czech footballer
- 1993 – Shehu Abdullahi, Nigerian footballer
- 1993 – Amjad Attwan, Iraqi footballer
- 1994 – Katie Archibald, Scottish track cyclist
- 1994 – Jerami Grant, American basketball player
- 1994 – Christina Grimmie, American singer-songwriter (died 2016)
- 1994 – Tyler Patrick Jones, American actor
- 1996 – Serhou Guirassy, French-Guinean footballer
- 1996 – Karim Hafez, Egyptian footballer
- 1996 – Robert Murić, Croatian footballer
- 1996 – Cene Prevc, Slovenian ski jumper
- 1997 – Dean Henderson, English footballer
- 1997 – Allan Saint-Maximin, French footballer
- 1997 – Felipe Vizeu, Brazilian footballer
- 1998 – Carsen Edwards, American basketball player
- 1998 – Mecole Hardman, American football player
- 1998 – Daniel Samohin, Israeli figure skater
- 1998 – Elizaveta Ukolova, Czech figure skater
- 2001 – Max Duggan, American football player
- 2001 – Kim Min-kyu, South Korean singer and actor
- 2003 – Andrea Brillantes, Filipino actress and model
- 2003 – Malina Weissman, American actress and model
- 2004 – DannyLux, American singer-songwriter
- 2008 – Emma Kok, Dutch singer

== Deaths ==
=== Pre-1600 ===
- 417 – Innocent I, pope of the Catholic Church
- 604 – Gregory I, pope of the Catholic Church (born 540)
- 1022 – Symeon the New Theologian (born 949)
- 1160 – Al-Muqtafi, caliph of the Abbasid Caliphate (born 1096)
- 1316 – Stefan Dragutin (born c. 1244)
- 1322 – Humphrey de Bohun, 4th Earl of Hereford, English general and politician, Lord High Constable of England (born 1276)
- 1539 – Thomas Boleyn, 1st Earl of Wiltshire, English diplomat and politician (born 1477)

=== 1601–1900 ===
- 1699 – Peder Griffenfeld, Danish politician (born 1635)
- 1898 – Zachris Topelius, Finnish-Swedish journalist, historian, and author (born 1818)

=== 1901–present ===
- 1916 – Marie von Ebner-Eschenbach, Austrian author (born 1830)
- 1925 – Sun Yat-sen, Chinese physician and politician, 1st President of the Republic of China (born 1866)
- 1929 – Asa Griggs Candler, American businessman and politician, 44th Mayor of Atlanta (born 1851)
- 1935 – Mihajlo Pupin, Serbian-American physicist and chemist (born 1858)
- 1942 – William Henry Bragg, English physicist, chemist, and mathematician, Nobel Prize laureate (born 1862)
- 1943 – Gustav Vigeland, Norwegian sculptor (born 1869)
- 1946 – Ferenc Szálasi, Hungarian soldier and politician, Head of State of Hungary (born 1897)
- 1949 – Wilhelm Steinkopf, German chemist (born 1879)
- 1954 – Marianne Weber, German sociologist and suffragist (born 1870)
- 1955 – Charlie Parker, American saxophonist and composer (born 1920)
- 1955 – Theodor Plievier, German author best known for his anti-war novel (born 1892)
- 1957 – Josephine Hull, American actress (born 1877)
- 1971 – Eugene Lindsay Opie, American physician and pathologist (born 1873)
- 1973 – Frankie Frisch, American baseball player and manager (born 1898)
- 1974 – George D. Sax, American banker and businessman (born 1904)
- 1985 – Eugene Ormandy, Hungarian-American violinist and conductor (born 1899)
- 1989 – Maurice Evans, English-American actor (born 1901)
- 1991 – Ragnar Granit, Finnish-Swedish neuroscientist and academic, Nobel Prize laureate (born 1900)
- 1991 – William Heinesen, Faroese author, poet, and author (born 1900)
- 1992 – Lucy M. Lewis, American potter (born 1890)
- 1998 – Beatrice Wood, American painter and potter (born 1893)
- 1999 – Yehudi Menuhin, American-Swiss violinist and conductor (born 1916)
- 1999 – Bidu Sayão, Brazilian-American soprano (born 1902)
- 2000 – Aleksandar Nikolić, Yugoslav basketball coach (born 1924)
- 2001 – Morton Downey Jr., American singer-songwriter, actor, and talk show host (born 1933)
- 2001 – Robert Ludlum, American author (born 1927)
- 2001 – Victor Westhoff, Dutch botanist and academic (born 1916)
- 2002 – Hartini, former wife of Sukarno (born 1924)
- 2002 – Spyros Kyprianou, Cypriot lawyer and politician, 2nd President of Cyprus (born 1932)
- 2002 – Jean-Paul Riopelle, Canadian painter and sculptor (born 1923)
- 2003 – Zoran Đinđić, Serbian philosopher and politician, 6th Prime Minister of Serbia (born 1952)
- 2003 – Howard Fast, American novelist and screenwriter (born 1914)
- 2003 – Lynne Thigpen, American actress and singer (born 1948)
- 2004 – Milton Resnick, Russian-American painter (born 1917)
- 2006 – Victor Sokolov, Russian-American priest and journalist (born 1947)
- 2008 – Jorge Guinzburg, Argentinian journalist and producer (born 1949)
- 2008 – Lazare Ponticelli, Italian-French soldier and supercentenarian (born 1897)
- 2010 – Miguel Delibes, Spanish journalist and author (born 1920)
- 2011 – Nilla Pizzi, Italian singer (born 1919)
- 2012 – Dick Harter, American basketball player and coach (born 1930)
- 2012 – Michael Hossack, American drummer (born 1946)
- 2012 – Friedhelm Konietzka, German-Swiss footballer and manager (born 1938)
- 2013 – Michael Grigsby, English director and producer (born 1936)
- 2013 – Ganesh Pyne, Indian painter and illustrator (born 1937)
- 2014 – Věra Chytilová, Czech actress, director, and screenwriter (born 1929)
- 2014 – Paul C. Donnelly, American scientist and engineer (born 1923)
- 2014 – José Policarpo, Portuguese cardinal (born 1936)
- 2015 – Willie Barrow, American minister and activist (born 1924)
- 2015 – Michael Graves, American architect and academic, designed the Portland Building and the Humana Building (born 1934)
- 2015 – Ada Jafri, Pakistani poet and author (born 1924)
- 2015 – Terry Pratchett, English journalist, author, and screenwriter (born 1948)
- 2016 – Rafiq Azad, Bangladeshi poet and author (born 1942)
- 2016 – Felix Ibru, Nigerian architect and politician, Governor of Delta State (born 1935)
- 2016 – Lloyd Shapley, American mathematician and economist, Nobel Prize laureate (born 1923)
- 2021 – Ronald DeFeo Jr., American criminal (born 1951)
- 2022 – Gertraud Gruber, German beautician and businesswoman (born 1921)

== Holidays and observances ==
- Arbor Day (China)
- Arbor Day (Taiwan)
- Aztec New Year
- Christian feast day:
  - Alphege
  - Angela Salawa
  - Bernard of Carinola (or of Capua)
  - Gorgonius, Peter Cubicularius and Dorotheus of Nicomedia
  - Mura (McFeredach)
  - Fina
  - Maximilian of Tebessa
  - Paul Aurelian
  - Pope Gregory I (Eastern Orthodox Church, Eastern Catholic Church, and Anglican Communion)
  - Theophanes the Confessor
  - March 12 (Eastern Orthodox liturgics)
- National Day (Mauritius)
- World Day Against Cyber Censorship
- Youth Day (Zambia)
