= Iinijärvi =

Lake in Finland

- Location within Finland
- Location: Finland
- Coordinates: 60°56′08″N 25°10′40″E
- Lake type: Glacial
- Max. length: 200 m (660 ft)
- Max. width: 100 m (330 ft)
- Surface area: 12,000 m^{2} (130,000 sq ft)
- Shore length^{1}: 460 m (1,510 ft)
- Surface elevation: 130 m (430 ft)
- ^{1} Shore length is not a well-defined measure.

Iinijärvi is a lake in Päijänne Tavastia, Kärkölä municipality, in Southern Finland. It is 200 metres long and 100 metres wide.
