= Kärkölä Church =

- Swedish: Kärkölä kyrka Finnish: Kärkölän kirkko
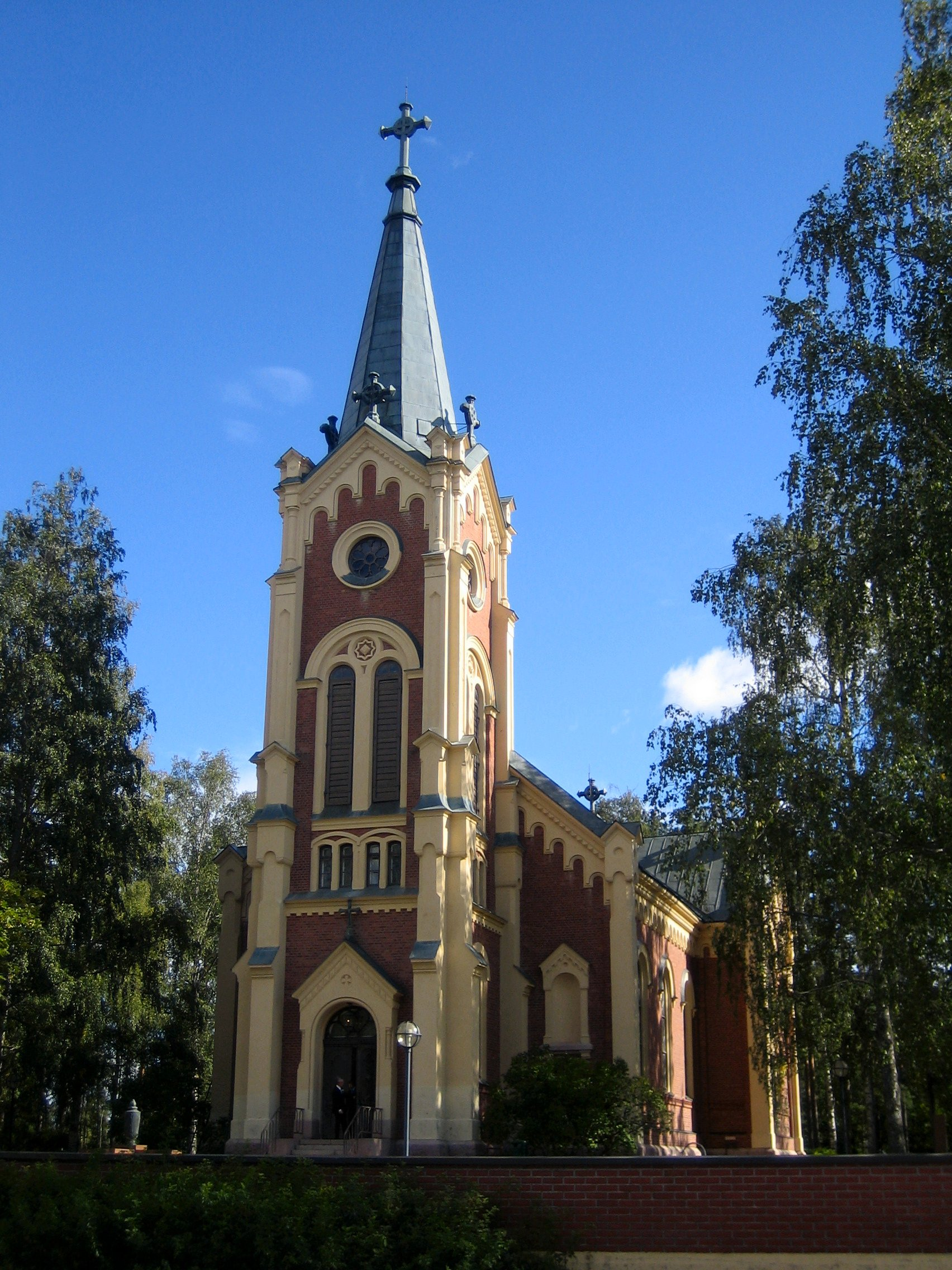
- Kärkölä Church
- Country: Finland
- Website: https://www.hollolanseurakunta.fi/kirkot-ja-tilat/kirkot/karkolan-kirkko

History
- Founded: 1887
- Consecrated: 29 September, 1889

Architecture
- Architectural type: Neo-Gothic
- Completed: 1889

The Kärkölä Church is a church of the Hollola Parish[fi] in Kärkölä, Päijät-Häme, Southern Finland. The red-brick church is designed in the Neo-Gothic style and is a long church. The church was designed by Ludvig Isak Lindqvist[fi].

The memorial in the church's war cemetery was designed by sculptor Viktor Jansson in 1949.

== History ==
The current red-brick Kärkölä Church was constructed between 1887–1889 in the Neo-Gothic style, based on the designs of architect Ludvig Isak Lindqvist. It was consecrated on Michaelmas in 1889. The church seats approximately 500 people.

The bells from the old church were moved to the new church's belfry. The altarpiece painted by an unknown artist and the light fixtures were also moved to the new church.

The current 26-stop pipe organ was acquired in 1966 from Kangasalan Urkutehdas. The last major renovation was completed in 1989 for the church's 100th anniversary.

=== The Old Church ===
Information about the first church is incomplete because records concerning Kärkölä were destroyed in a fire at the Hollola parsonage, though certain details were preserved.

The old wooden church that burned down was a wooden cross-shaped church built in 1754, which stood until 1901. Today, it survives only as a miniature model in its former location at the Kärkölä graveyard and in the form of historical documents. The fire-damaged church was dismantled and reused for other construction purposes in the early 1900s.

== Gallery ==
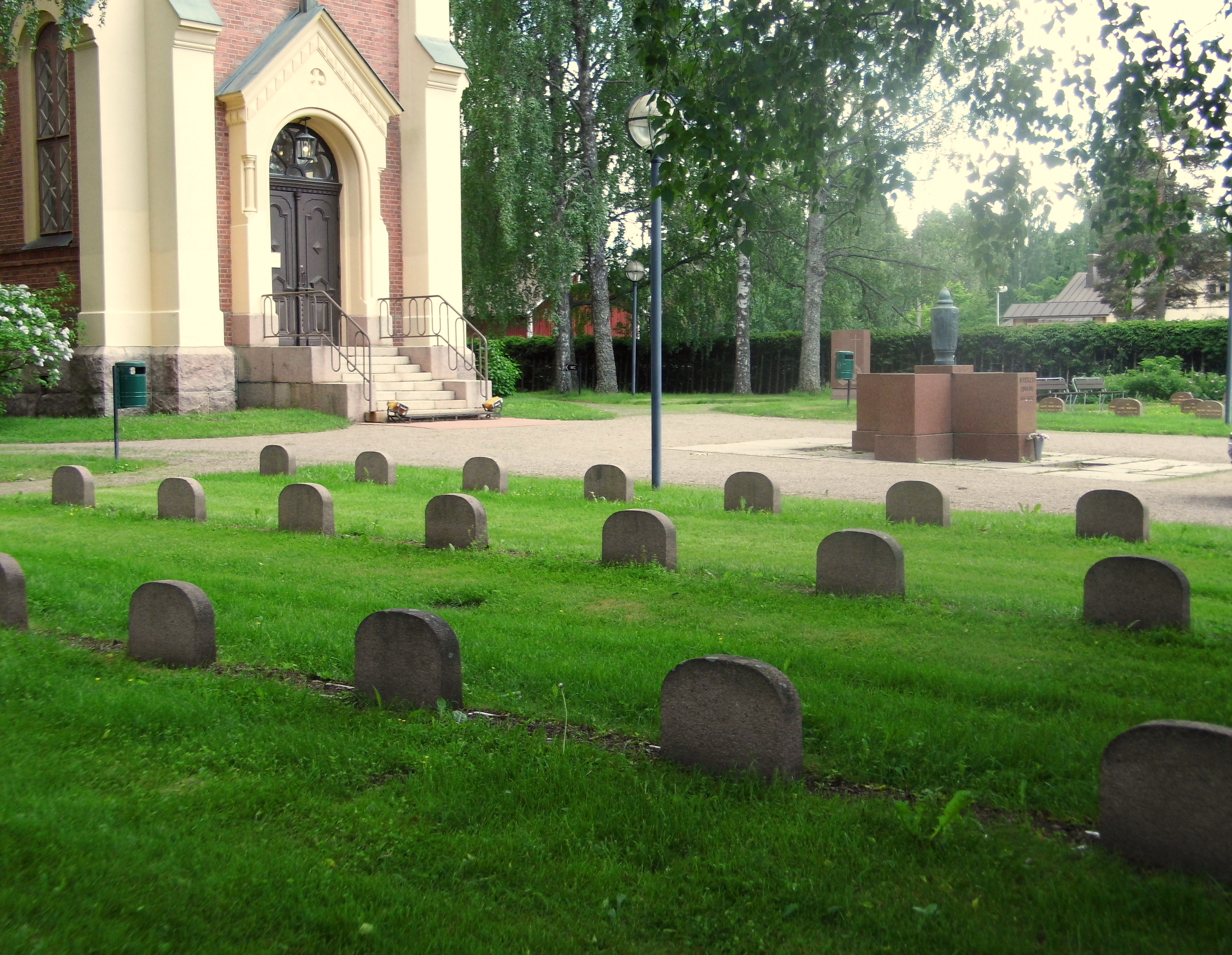
The church's war cemetery, summer 2013.

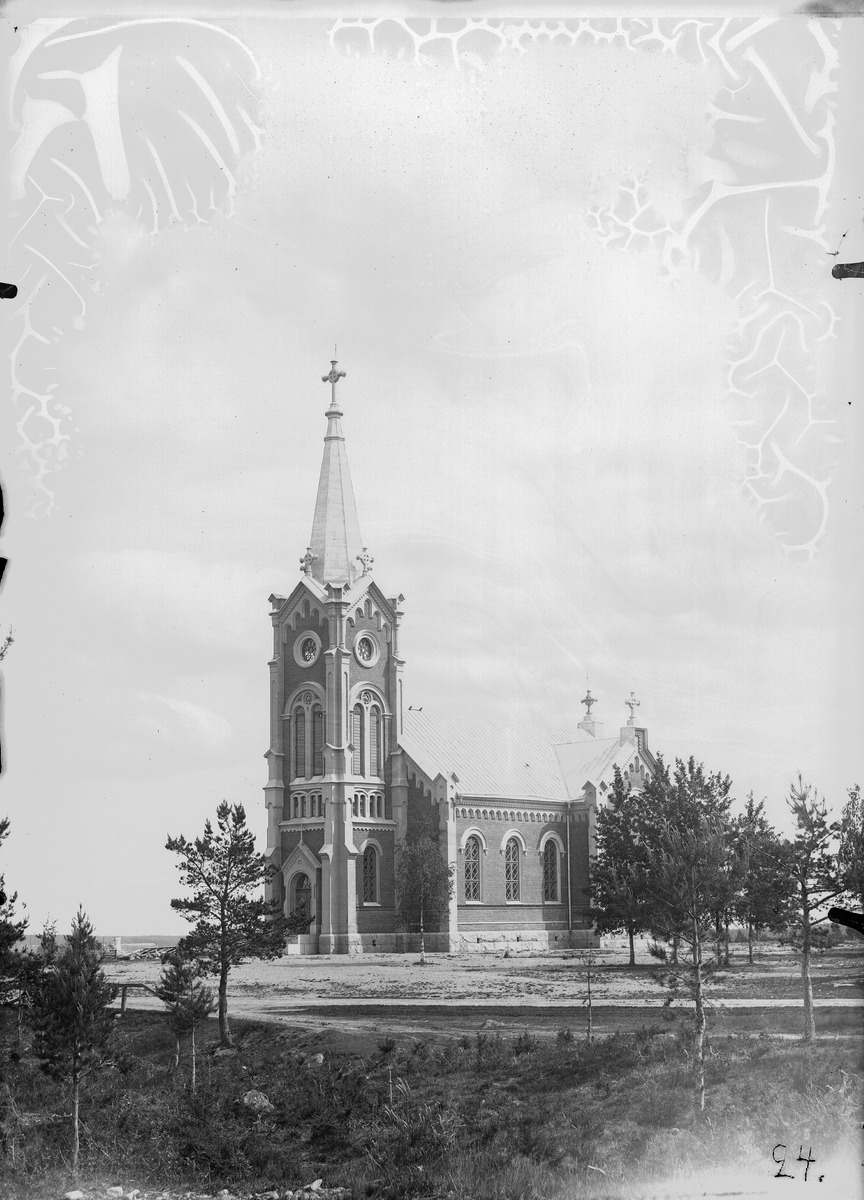
The church 3 years after construction, 1892.

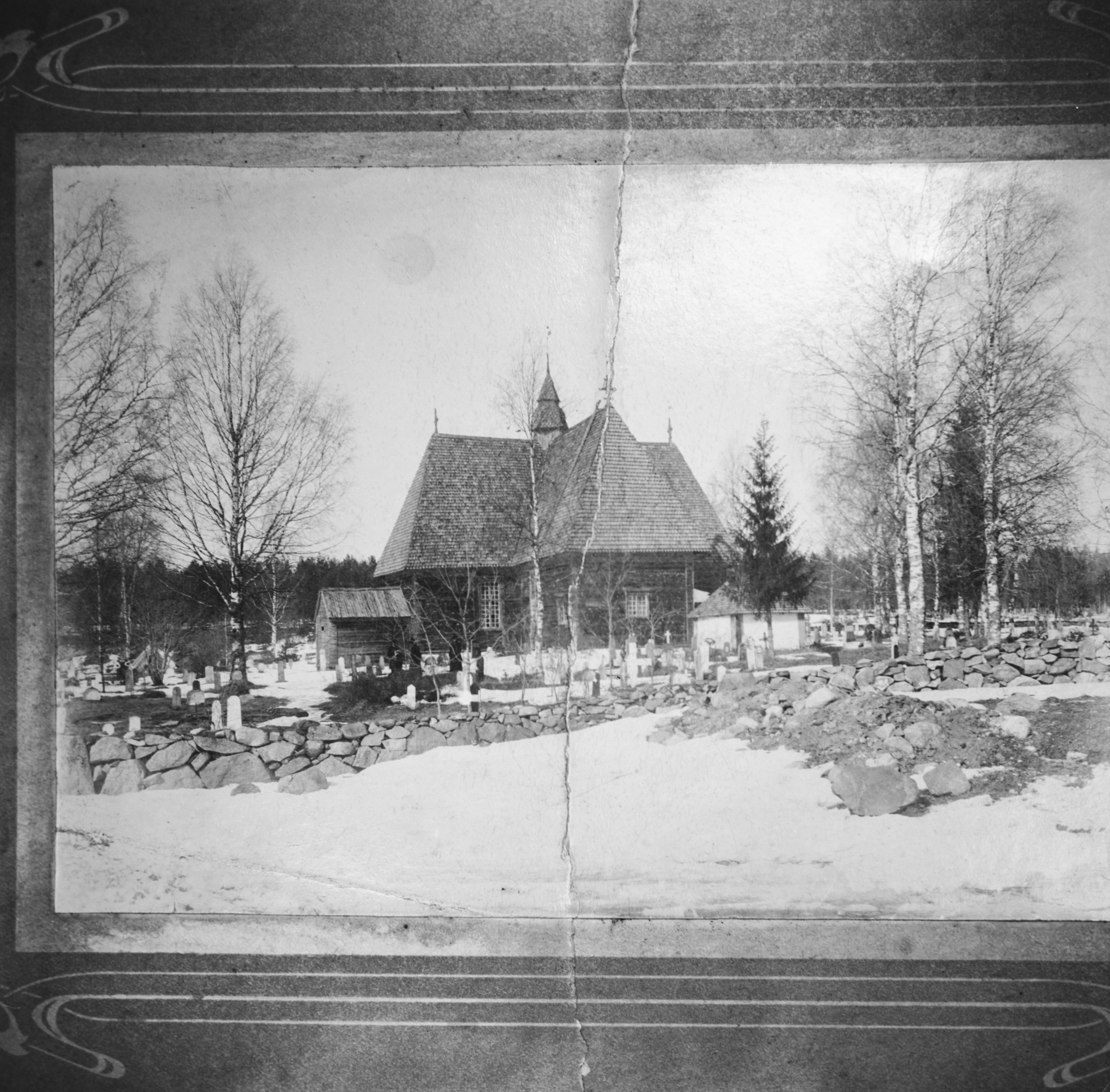
The old church, date unknown.

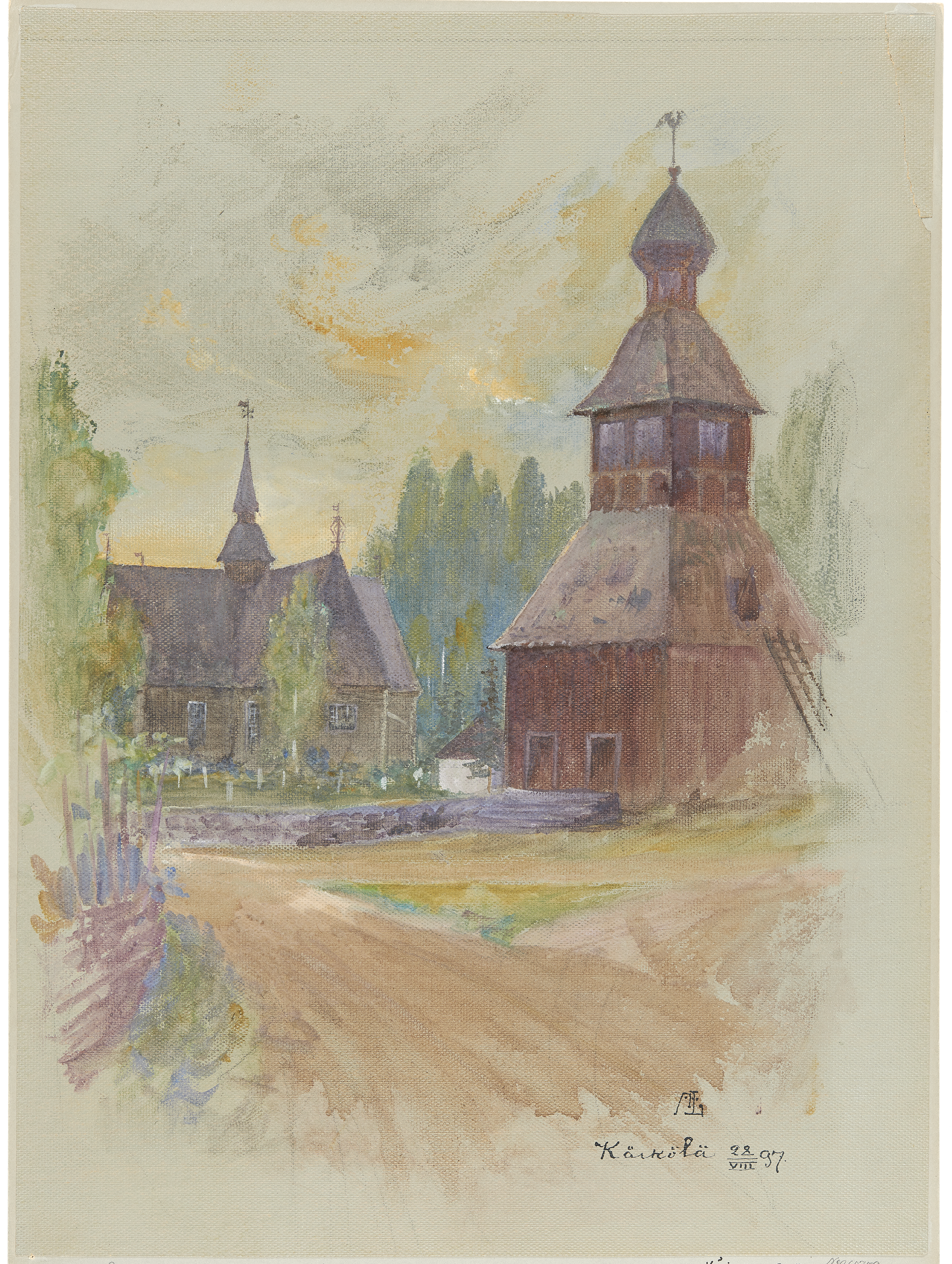
The old church and the bell tower, 1897 sketch.

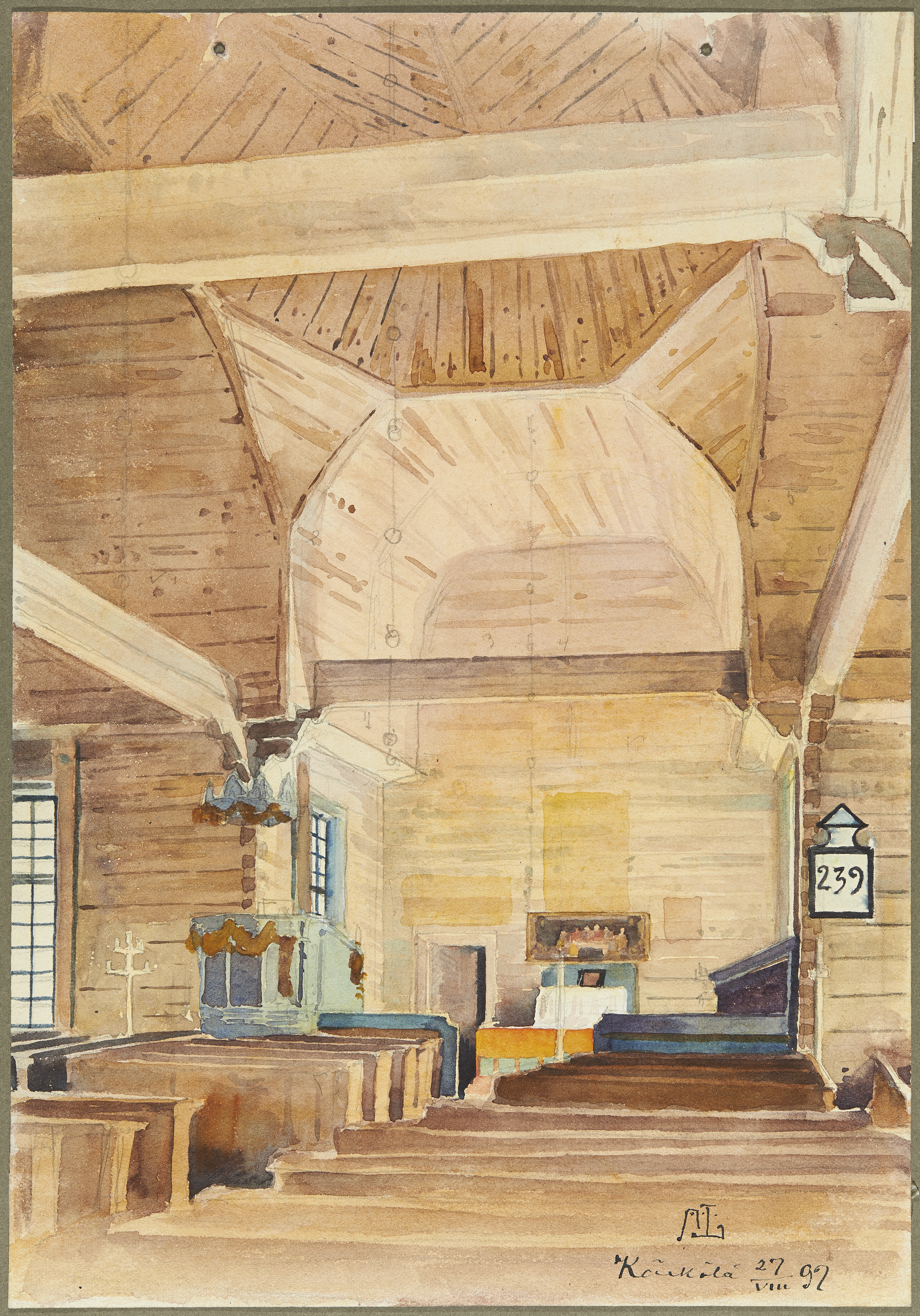
Interior of the old church, 1897 sketch.

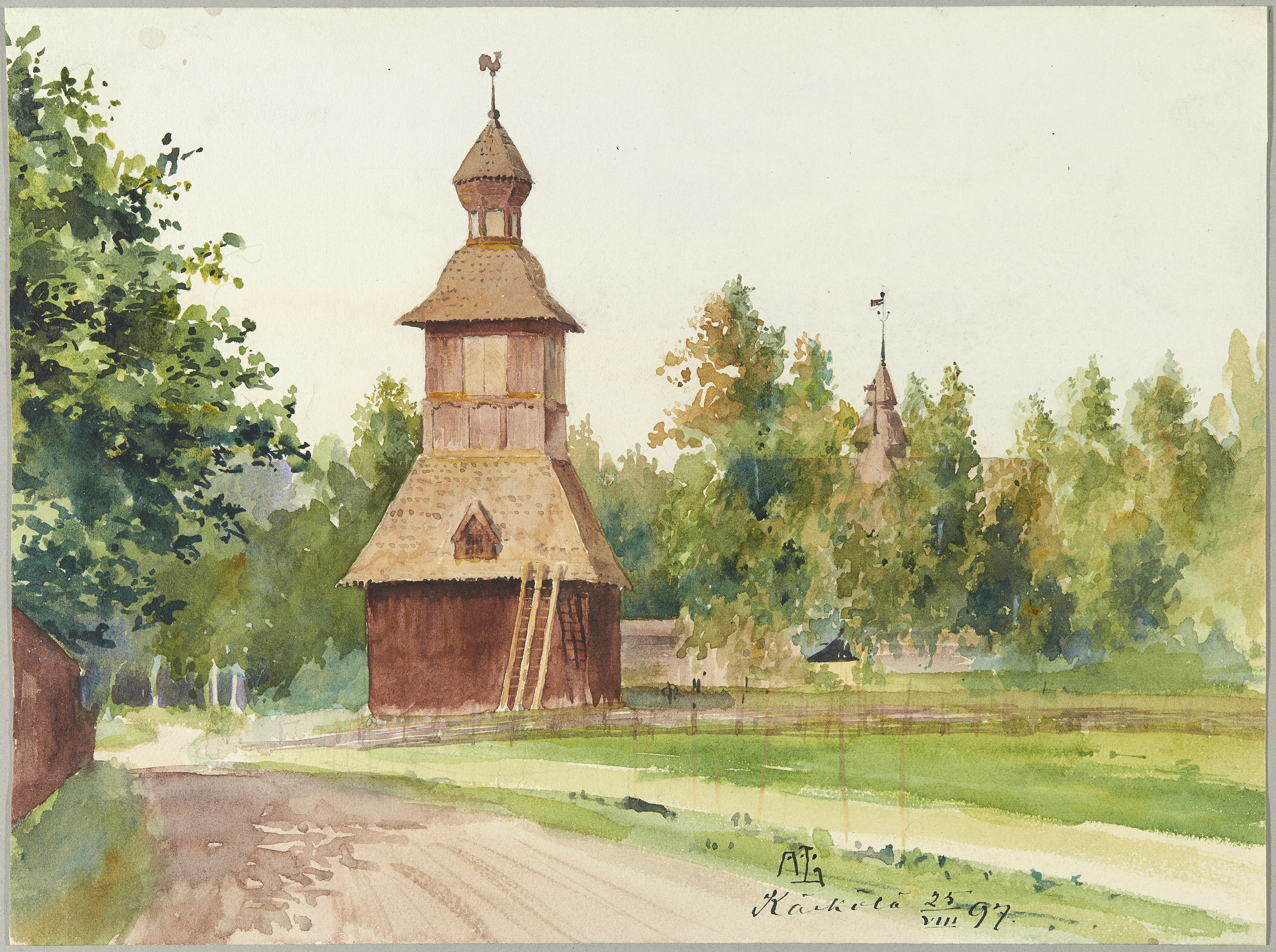
The old church's bell tower, 1897 sketch.
