= Lappila =

Village in Kärkölä, Finland

Coordinates: 60°50′58″N 25°10′29″E

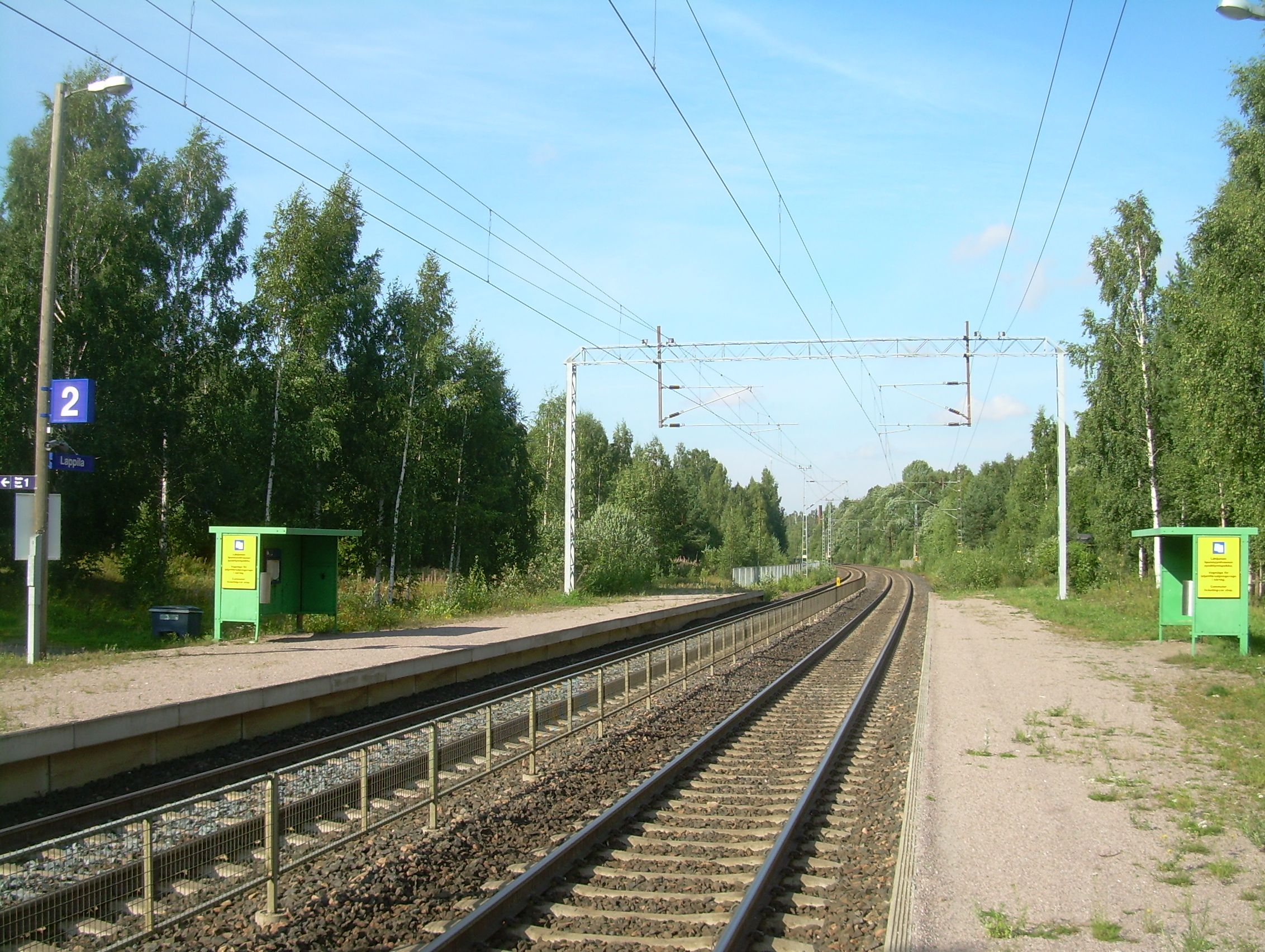
Lappila railway station

Lappila is a village of Kärkölä municipality in Päijänne Tavastia, Finland. Its population is about 600. The village is located along the Riihimäki–Lahti railway, along which VR's regional trains stop at Lappila railway station. From the north, Lappila is bypassed by the main road 54, on the north side of which the Teuronjoki River flows near Lappila.

Lappila is the youngest of the villages of Kärkölä, inhabited only in the 16th and 17th centuries, being before that Vanaja' hunting ground; in the Kalmberg map of 1855–1856, the village is mentioned as "Lappila by" and there are three houses. A primary school was built in Lappila in the 1890s and opened in 1898. Teaching was transferred in 1951 to a new stone school, which was closed in 2012. The wooden school later housed a library. In 1934, the Lappilinna youth club was built in the village.

A local sports association called Lappila Nousu has been organizing the Finnish Beach Wrestling Championships since 2015.

== See also ==
- Järvelä, Kärkölä
