= Turenki rail accident =

1940 fatal train accident in Finland

Details
- Date: 12 March 1940; 05:30 (EEST)
- Location: between Turenki and Harviala; 96 km (60 mi) N from Helsinki
- Country: Finland
- Line: Riihimäki–Tampere railway
- Operator: Finnish State Railways
- Incident type: Train collision
- Cause: Signalling error

Statistics
- Trains: 2
- Deaths: 39
- Injured: 69

The Turenki rail accident occurred on 12 March 1940, at 05:30 local time (03:30 UTC) near Turenki, Finland, and remains the worst rail accident in Finnish history. A troop train carrying soldiers of the 71st Supply Company and horses south from Loimaa to Viipuri collided with a northbound freight train. The two trains were travelling at 40 km/h (25 mph) and 25–30 km/h (15–19 mph) respectively at the time of collision. The death toll was particularly high due to many troop carriages being crushed; the carriages had initially been located at the rear of the train but were moved to the front just behind the locomotive at Toijala as the train changed direction. Rescue operations were also delayed.

The accident was caused by a signalling error; the signaller, who was still on probation and who had been awake for the past 36 hours, mistakenly cleared the freight train to pass Turenki north towards the Harviala railroad station, even though the troop train had already passed the latter station which had been chosen as the place the two trains would pass each other. The signaller was sentenced to a two-year, one-month and ten-day prison sentence and to pay 30 000 Finnish marks in compensation.

The accident went largely unreported, as the accident happened during World War II and on the same day that the Moscow Peace Treaty which ended the Winter War between Finland and the Soviet Union was signed and went into effect. It was one of three rail accidents to take place in Finland in March 1940; the Iittala rail accident on March 4 claimed 31 lives and the Putikko rail accident on March 18 claimed 14 lives.

A memorial to those who lost their lives in the crash was unveiled at Turenki railway station in 2000.

== See also ==
- Quintinshill rail disaster – the worst rail accident in British history, which took place during wartime (but World War I, not World War II) and was likewise a train collision caused by signalling errors
- Lists of rail accidents
