= Turenki =

Village in Janakkala, Finland

Coordinates: 60°55′N 024°38′E

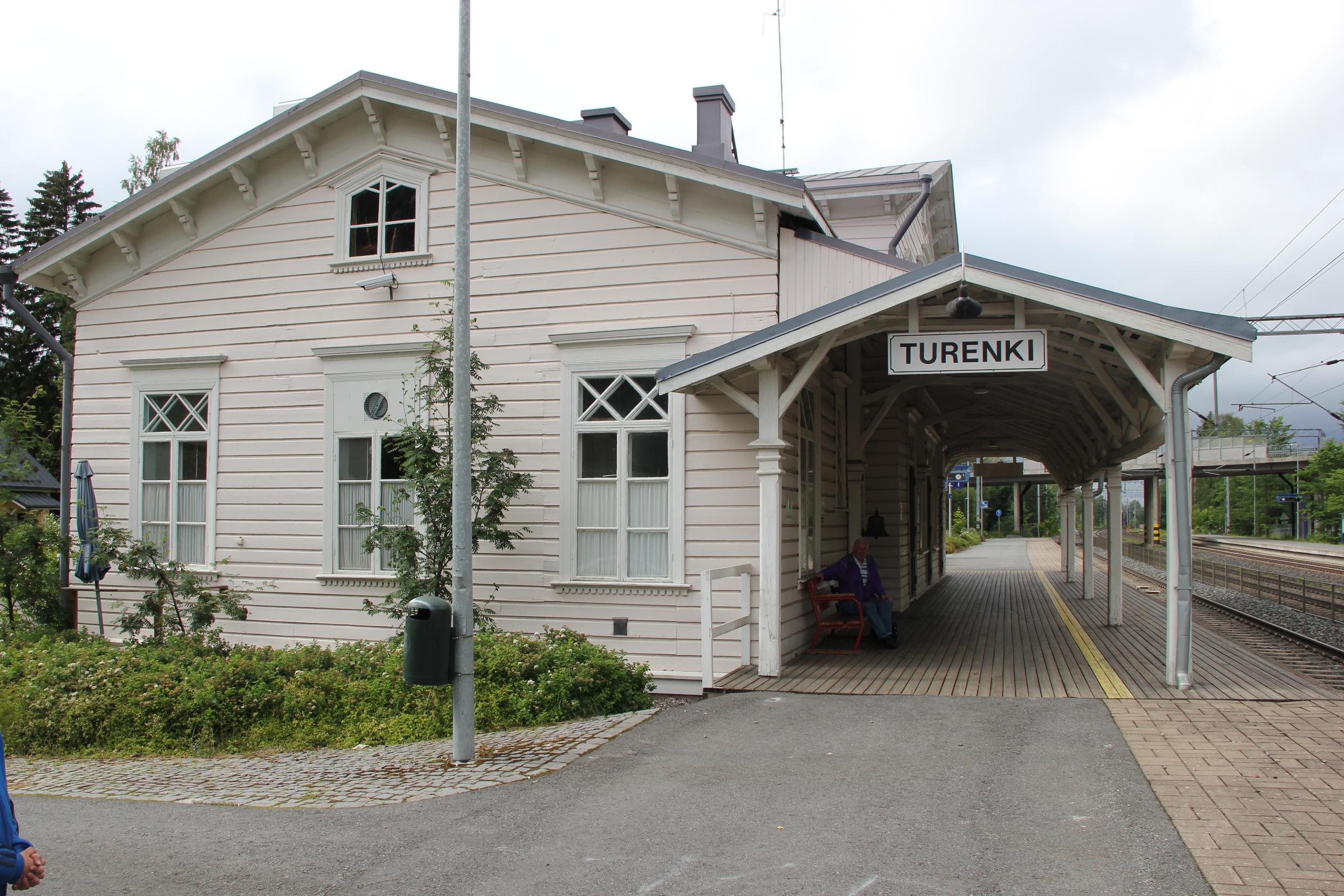
The Turenki railway station is the oldest of its kind in all of Finland

Turenki (Finnish pronunciation: [ˈtureŋki]) is a population center in the municipality of Janakkala, Finland, with a population of some 7,500 people. It has been said that Turenki is translated from Turinge, Thuring or Turängi. It is among the largest population centers of Janakkala, along with Tervakoski. Turenki is located about 13 kilometres (8.1 mi) southeast of the city of Hämeenlinna.

== History ==
On 12 March 1940, the most destructive train accident in Finnish history happened in Turenki, where 39 people died and 69 got injured.

== Locations ==
Turenki contains the oldest railway station in Finland, built in the year 1862 as part of the Helsinki–Hämeenlinna Railway. It is also home to a factory owned by Valio Ltd., which produces mostly dairy products.

== Notable individuals ==
- Anssi Pesonen, ice hockey player
- Eino Kalpala, alpine skier
- Ellen Jokikunnas, model and television host
- Janne Virtanen, athlete
- Lyyli Aalto, Member of Parliament
- Tauno Marttinen, composer
- Veikko Lahti, athlete
