= Ryttylä =

Village in Hausjärvi, Finland

Coordinates: 60°49.20′N 24°45.75′E

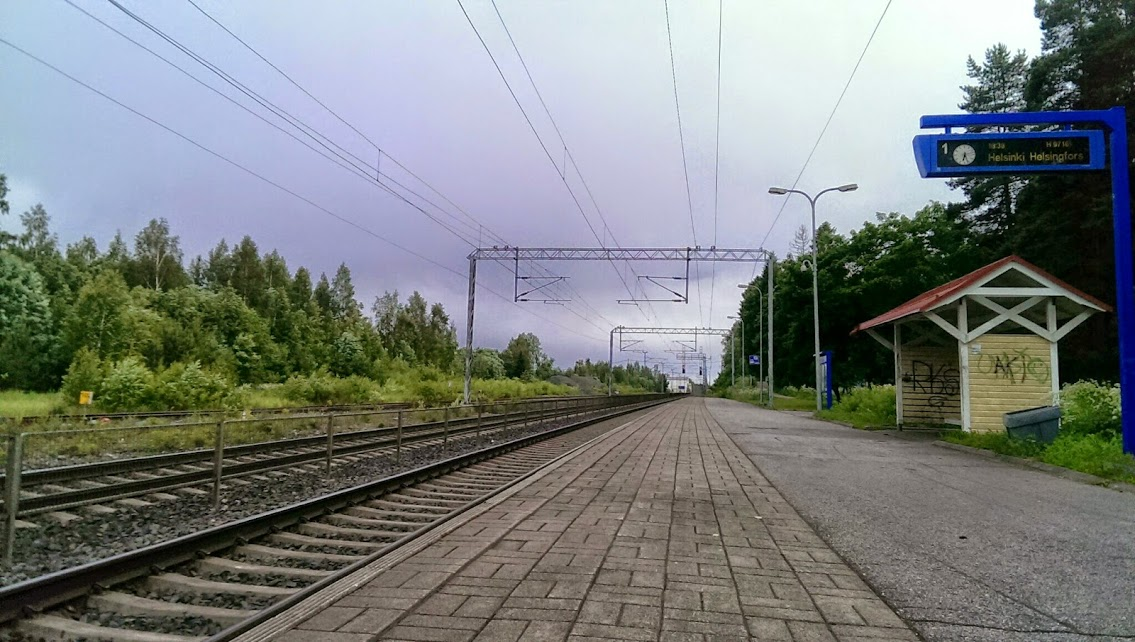
The Ryttylä railway station

Ryttylä (Finnish pronunciation: [ˈrytːylæ]) is a village in the municipality of Hausjärvi in Kanta-Häme, Finland with approximately 1,550 residents as of December 31, 2023. It is located along the Finnish Main Line, approximately 18 kilometres (11 mi) northwest of municipal centre Oitti, approximately 11 kilometres (6.8 mi) north of the Riihimäki town and approximately 9 kilometres (5.6 mi) east of Janakkala's village Tervakoski.

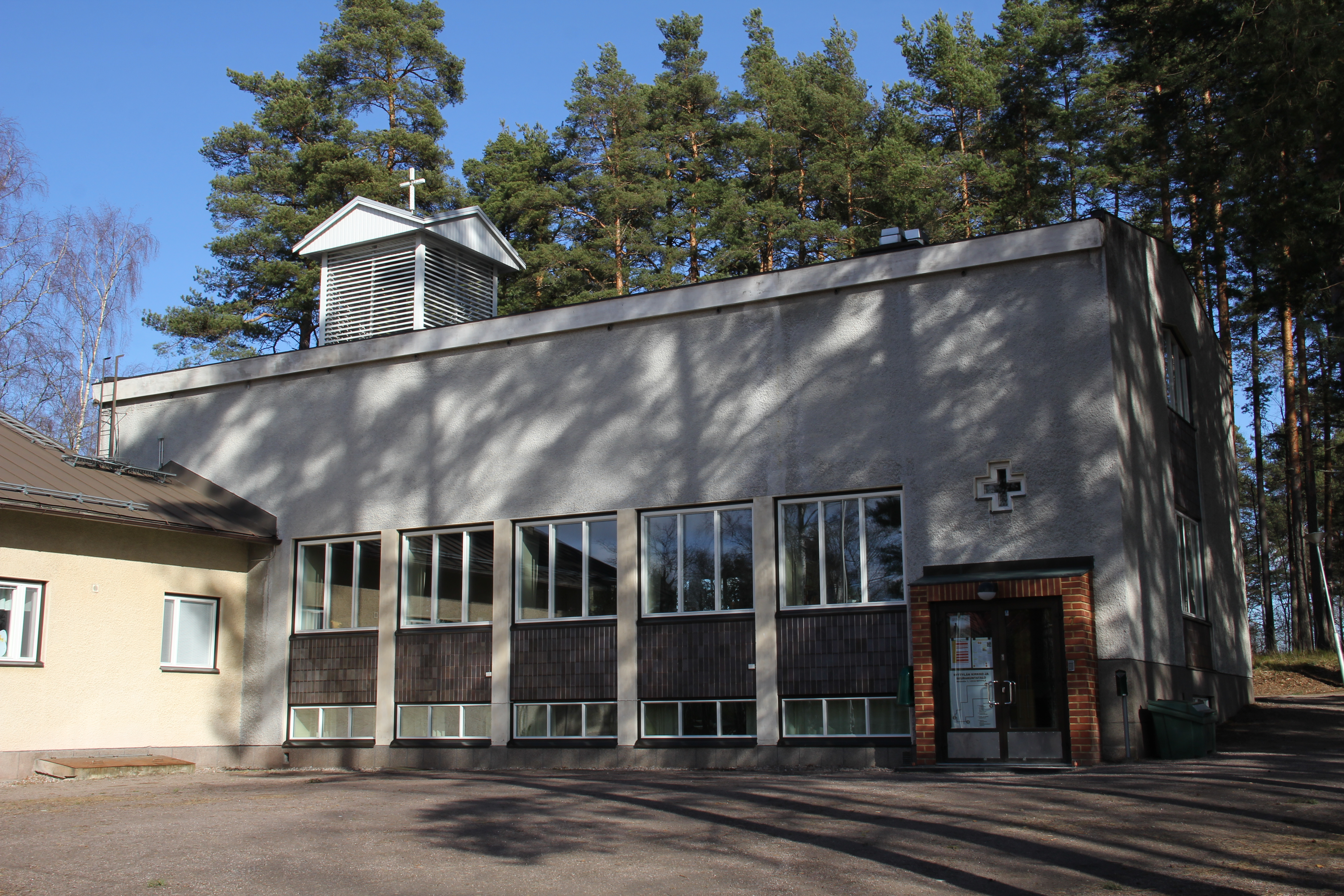
The Ryttylä Church

There is a church in Ryttylä that was completed in 1961. Ryttylä has also a pharmacy, grocery store, restaurant, barbershop, and café, among other things. Ryttylä's primary school has approximately 200 students.

The sports club called Ryttylän Kiri (formerly KOE) has been operating in Ryttylä since 1924. In 1997, Ryttylä was chosen as the village of the year in Kanta-Häme.
