= Otto Pesonen =

Finnish politician

Otto Pesonen (9 September 1868, Heinävesi – 21 January 1936) was a Finnish farmer and politician. He belonged to the Young Finnish Party until 1918 and to the National Progressive Party thereafter. Pesonen served as a Member of the Diet of Finland from 1905 to 1906 and as a Member of the Parliament of Finland from 1909 to 1910, from 1916 to 1917 and again for a short time from February to March 1919.
