= Edvard Pesonen =

Finnish politician (1904–1977)

Edvard Pesonen (15 August 1904 – 17 January 1977) was a Finnish politician, born in Sysmä. He was a member of the Parliament of Finland from 1933 to 1939 and from 1943 to 1966, representing the Social Democratic Party of Finland (SDP). He was a presidential elector in the 1937, 1940, 1943, 1950 and 1956 presidential elections.
