= Turenki railway station =

Railway station in Janakkala, Finland

Turenki
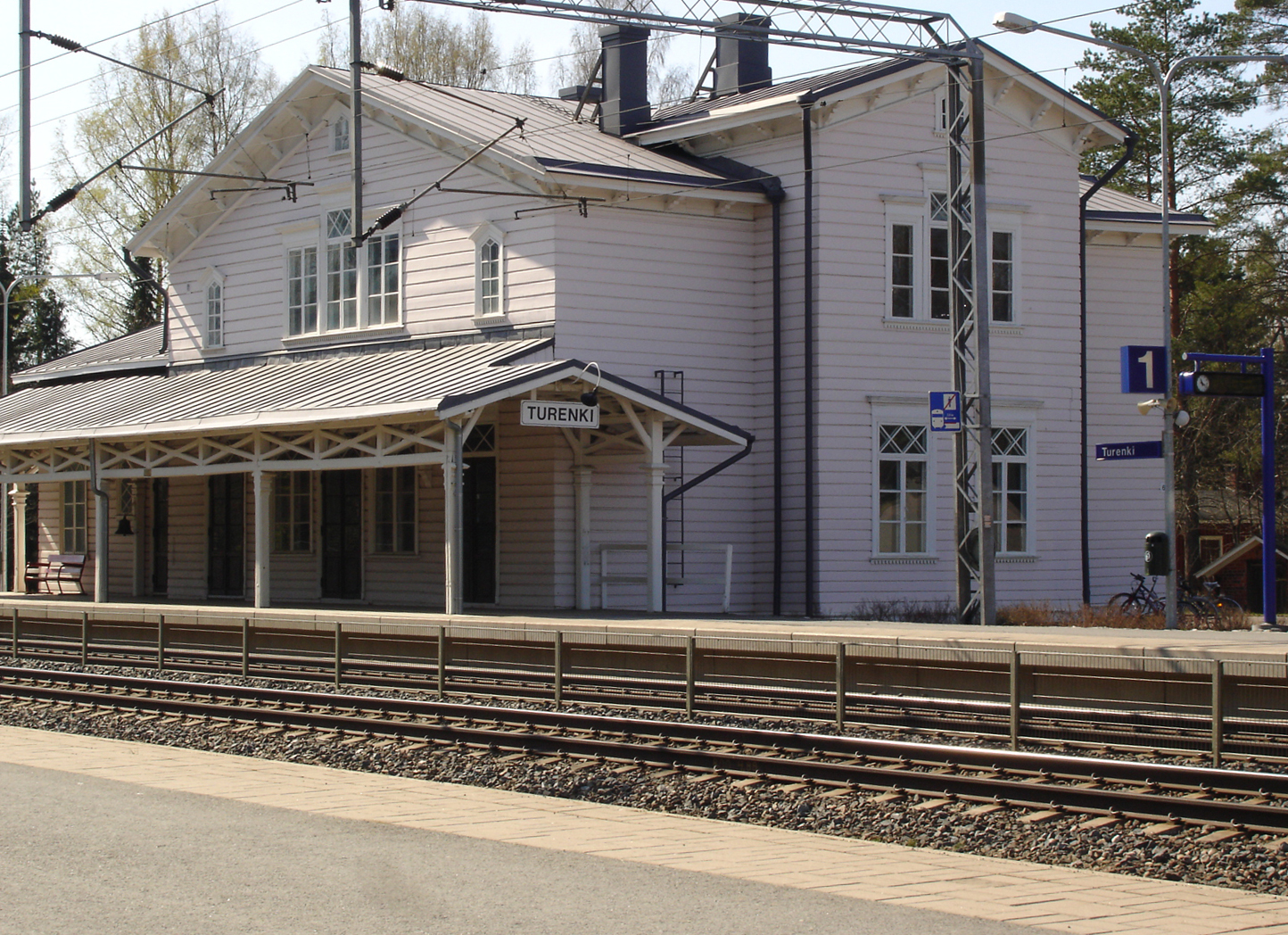

General information
- Location: Kuumolantie 3, 14200; Turenki, Janakkala; Finland
- Coordinates: 60°55′05″N 024°38′18″E
- System: VR station
- Owner: Finnish Transport Infrastructure Agency
- Operator: VR Group
- Line: Riihimäki–Tampere railway
- Platforms: 2 side platforms
- Tracks: 2 (with platforms); 3 (in total)

Construction
- Architect: Carl Albert Edelfelt

Other information
- Station code: Tu
- Classification: Operating point

History
- Opened: 17 March 1862; 164 years ago
- Former names: Turenki/Turengi (until May 1897)

Passengers
- 2008: 59,000

Services
| Preceding station | VR commuter rail | Following station |
|---|---|---|
| Ryttylä towards Helsinki | R | Hämeenlinna towards Tampere |
| Ryttylä towards Helsinki | D | Hämeenlinna towards Tampere |
Location
- Location within Kanta-Häme Location within Finland

The Turenki railway station (Finnish: Turengin rautatieasema, Swedish: Turenki järnvägsstation, formerly Turengi) is located in the municipality of Janakkala, Finland, in the urban area and municipal seat of Turenki. It is located along the Riihimäki–Tampere railway, and its neighboring stations are Hämeenlinna in the north and Ryttylä in the south.

The Finnish Heritage Agency has classified Turenki railway station as a nationally significant built cultural environment.

== History ==
Turenki railway station was one of the first railway stations in Finland established on the country's first railway line in 1862. Originally Leppäkoski was considered as the place for a railway station, but in the end the station was established at Turenki and was one of the candidates to become the western terminus of the railway line to St. Petersburg (which was eventually built starting from Riihimäki station instead).

Being one of the candidates to become a junction station for the St. Petersburg railway line, the station building for Turenki station was originally supposed to be built out of bricks. Due to financial issues, the station building was eventually built out of wood instead. The station building designed by architect Carl Albert Edelfelt was completed in 1862. The original platform shelter on platform track 1 exists to this day and was renovated in 1999.

Turenki started to develop into an industrial centre, when a sugar factory was founded in the village in 1940. The population also started to grow by the latter half of the 20th century, surpassing 7 000 in 2000. Turenki railway station has been unstaffed since 1995.

=== Turenki rail accident ===
The worst rail accident in Finnish history thus far happened near the Turenki station on March 12, 1940, when a troop train headed to Viipuri collided with a northbound freight train due to a signalling error leading up to 39 lives lost and 69 injured.

== Services and departure tracks ==
Turenki served by VR commuter rail lines R and D on the route Helsinki–Riihimäki–Hämeenlinna–Tampere. Southbound trains toward Riihimäki and Helsinki use track 1, while northbound trains toward Hämeenlinna and Tampere use track 3. Track 2 has no platform and is only used by long-distance trains that pass through the station.
