= Kärkölä =

- Municipality
- Kärkölän kunta Kärkölä kommun
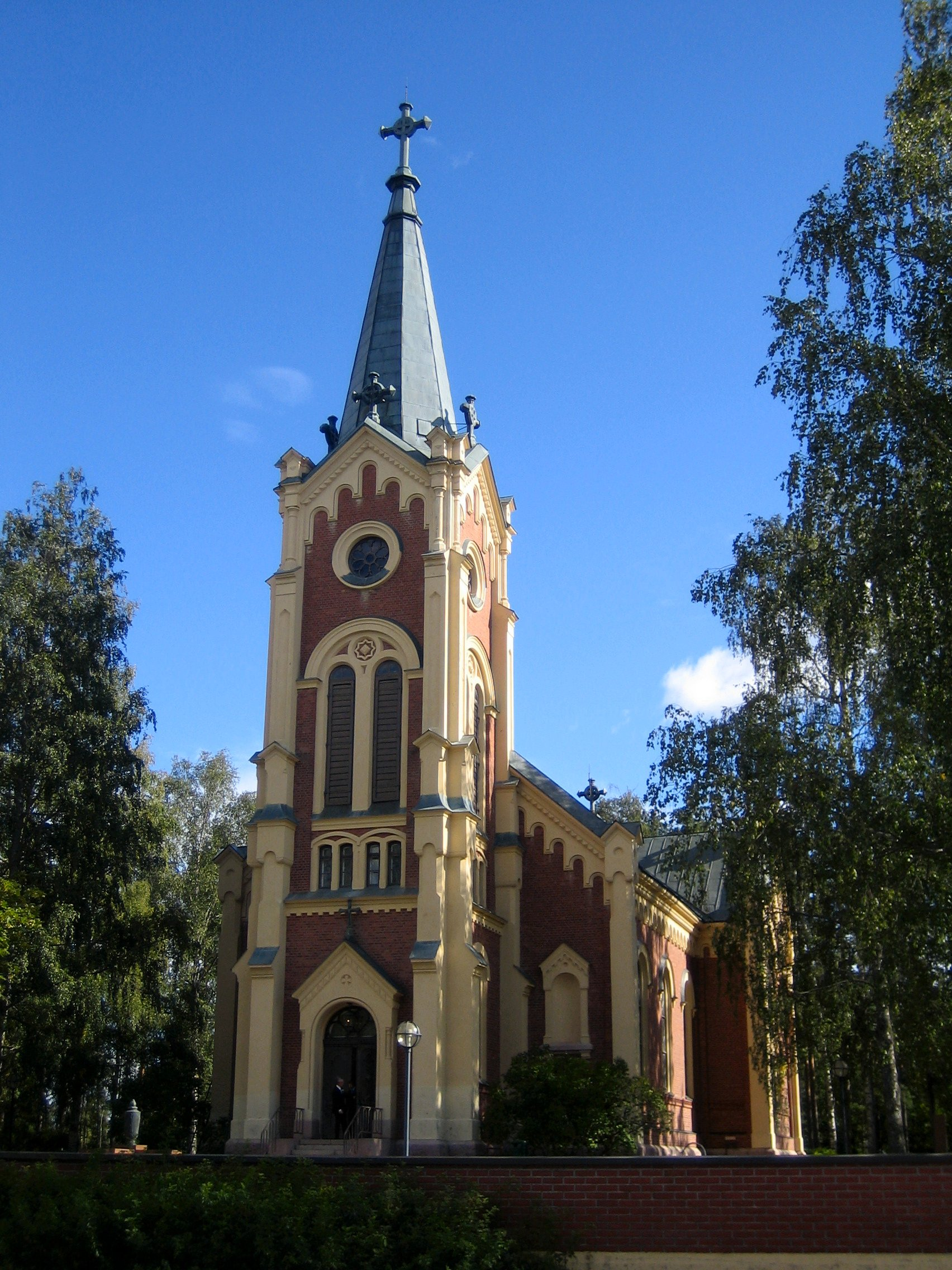
- Kärkölä Church

- Coat of arms

- Location of Kärkölä in Finland
- Interactive map of Kärkölä
- Coordinates: 60°52′N 025°16.5′E
- Country: Finland
- Region: Päijät-Häme
- Sub-region: Lahti
- Charter: 1865
- Seat: Järvelä

Government
  - Mayor: Markku Koskinen

Area (2018-01-01)
  - Total: 259.30 km^{2} (100.12 sq mi)
  - Land: 256.5 km^{2} (99.0 sq mi)
  - Water: 2.84 km^{2} (1.10 sq mi)
  - Rank: 243rd largest in Finland

Population (2025-12-31)
  - Total: 4,052
  - Rank: 189th largest in Finland
  - Density: 15.8/km^{2} (41/sq mi)

Population by native language
  - Finnish: 93.4% (official)
  - Swedish: 0.5%
  - Others: 6.1%

Population by age
  - 0 to 14: 13.3%
  - 15 to 64: 58.5%
  - 65 or older: 28.1%
- Time zone: UTC+02:00 (EET)
  - Summer (DST): UTC+03:00 (EEST)
- Climate: Dfc
- Website: www.karkola.fi

Kärkölä (Finnish: [ˈkærkølæ]) is a municipality of Finland. It is located in the province of Southern Finland and is part of the Päijät-Häme region. The municipality has a population of 4,052 (31 December 2025) and covers an area of 259.30 square kilometres (100.12 sq mi) of which 2.84 km^{2} (1.10 sq mi) is water. The population density is 15.8 inhabitants per square kilometre (41/sq mi). Its seat is in Järvelä, which is located along the Riihimäki–Lahti railway.

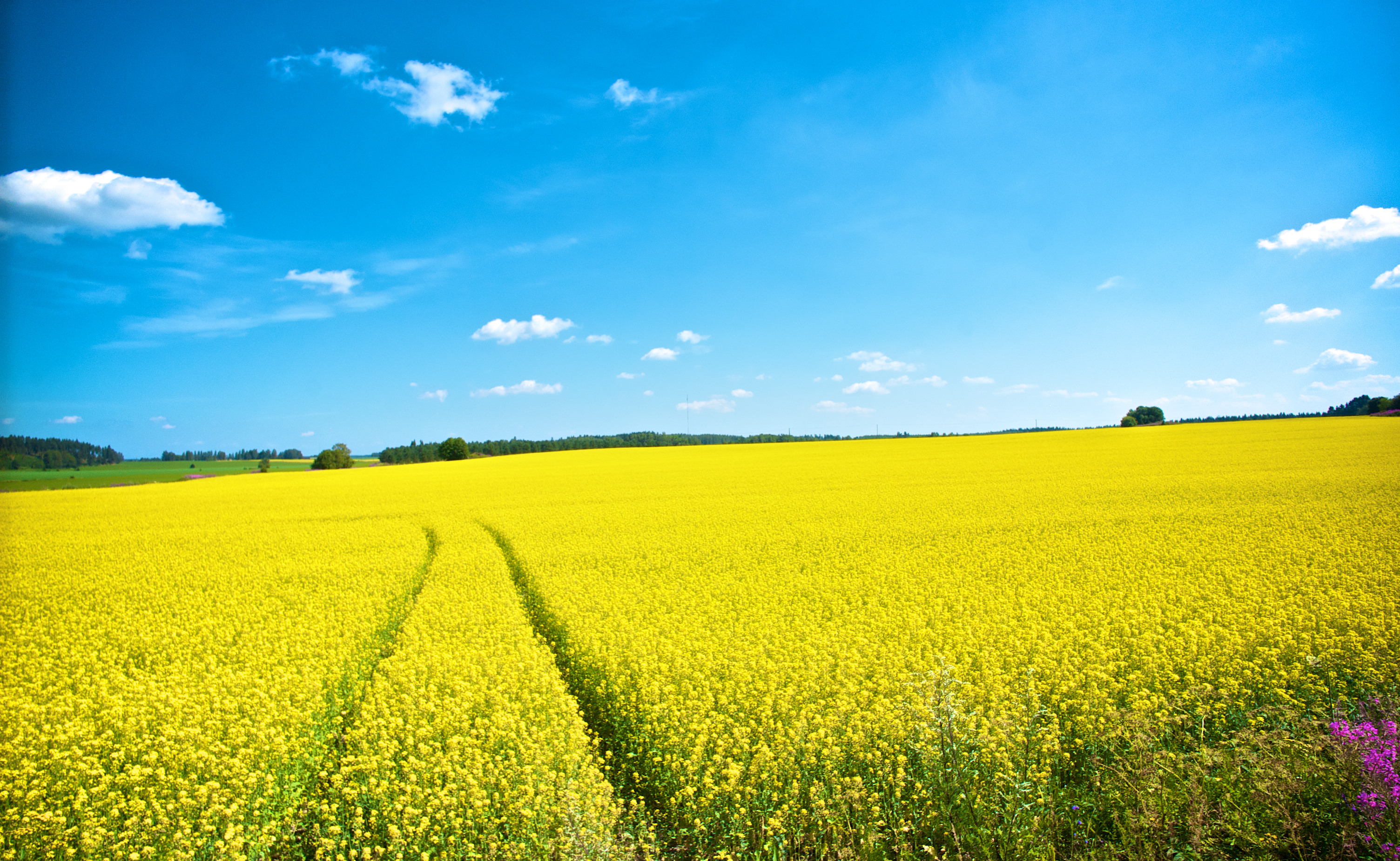
Rapeseed field north of Kärkölä's church village.

Neighbour municipalities: Hausjärvi, Hollola, Hämeenlinna, Mäntsälä and Orimattila. The distance between Kärkölä and Lahti is 29 kilometres (18 mi).

The municipality is unilingually Finnish.

== History ==
Kärkölä once belonged to the Hollola parish, and in 1711 it became the Hollola chapel parish. The first church was completed in 1754 and the second in 1889. Officially, the municipality of Kärkölä was founded in 1867. In the late 19th century, the eccentric engineer named Carl Constantin Collin, who ruled over large areas of both Hollola and Kärkölä, built large parks and building groups in the Huovila area.

== Villages ==
Hevonoja, Hongisto, Hähkäniemi, Iso-Sattiala, Järvelä, Karvala, Kärkölä (Kirkonkylä), Lappila, Maavehmaa, Marttila, Nummenkulma, Uusikylä, Vähä-Sattiala.

== Notable people ==
- Carl Niclas von Hellens (1745–1820), botanist
- Erik Gabriel Melartin (1780–1847), the Archbishop of Turku
- Helvi Sipilä (1915–2009), diplomat, lawyer and politician
- Emil Väre (1885–1974), wrestler and Olympics gold medalist

== See also ==
- Finnish national road 54
- Järvelä railway station
