= Saku Pesonen =

Finnish footballer (born 1985)

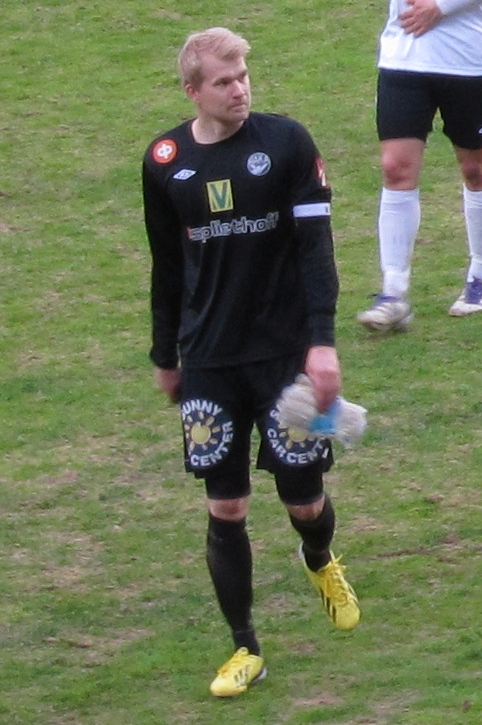
- Saku Pesonen in the ground.

Personal information
- Date of birth: 30 November 1985 (age 40)
- Place of birth: Lappeenranta, Finland
- Height: 1.87 m (6 ft 2 in)
- Position: Goalkeeper

Senior career*
Years	Team	Apps	(Gls)
2002–2005	Pantterit	0	(0)
2006–2007	Lahti	4	(0)
2008–2009	Hämeenlinna	40	(0)
2010–2015	Haka	109	(1)
2016–2021	Kultsu	48	(0)

Managerial career
- 2021–2022: Kultsu
- * Club domestic league appearances and goals

Saku Pesonen (born 10 November 1985) was a Finnish football coach and a former goalkeeper. He was the former manager of Kultsu.

== Club career ==
Pesonen started his footballing career at his local club FC Pantterit in 2002 while they played at the third and fourth level of Finnish football system.

He was signed by Veikkausliiga side FC Lahti in 2006 where he provided a backup for then first-choice goalkeeper Michał Sławuta. He made his top flight debut on 22 October 2010 against Tampere United. Despite winning the Finnish League Cup in 2007 season, Pesonen was only able to make in total of four appearances during those two season with Lahti. Pesonen left FC Lahti 2008 and dropped down a level to sign with FC Hämeenlinna where he was an instant first choice.

After a successful period with Hämeenlinna, Pesonen was snapped up by FC Haka for the 2009 season to cover as backup for Janne Korhonen. In January 2010 Pesonen signed a two-year contract extension with FC Haka, and he was promoted to first choice in the middle of the 2010 season after Korhonen's departure to JJK.

== Coaching career ==
He was appointed head coach of Kultsu for the 2021 season upon his retirement as a player. The contract was extended for the 2022 season in November 2021. He retired from coaching at the end of the 2022 season and was replaced by Marko Kohonen.
