= Emil Pesonen =

Finnish politician

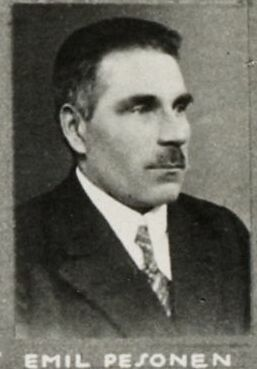
Emil Pesonen in 1930

Emil Juhana Pesonen (16 September 1883, Kerimäki – 30 April 1958) was a Finnish farmer and politician. He served as a Member of the Parliament of Finland from 1930 to 1933, representing the National Coalition Party.
