= Hausjärvi =

- Municipality
- Hausjärven kunta Hausjärvi kommun
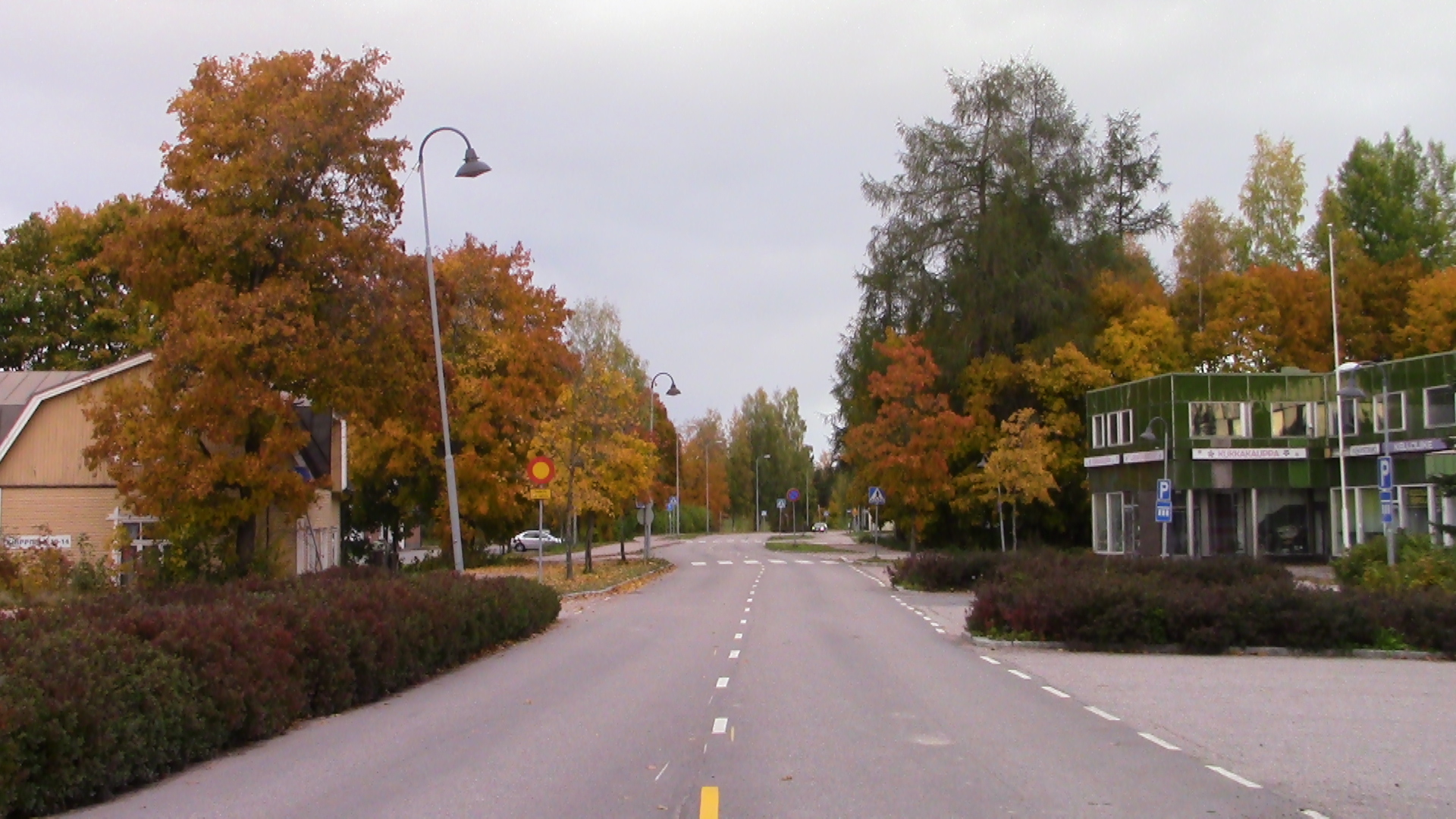

- Coat of arms

- Location of Hausjärvi in Finland
- Interactive map of Hausjärvi
- Coordinates: 60°47.2′N 025°01.5′E
- Country: Finland
- Region: Kanta-Häme
- Sub-region: Riihimäki
- Charter: 1868
- Seat: Oitti
- Villages: Hikiä, Ryttylä

Government
  - Municipal manager: Pekka Määttänen

Area (2018-01-01)
  - Total: 398.77 km^{2} (153.97 sq mi)
  - Land: 389.42 km^{2} (150.36 sq mi)
  - Water: 8.98 km^{2} (3.47 sq mi)
  - Rank: 205th largest in Finland

Population (2025-12-31)
  - Total: 7,862
  - Rank: 119th largest in Finland
  - Density: 20.19/km^{2} (52.3/sq mi)

Population by native language
  - Finnish: 95.9% (official)
  - Swedish: 0.4%
  - Others: 3.7%

Population by age
  - 0 to 14: 17.1%
  - 15 to 64: 60.3%
  - 65 or older: 22.6%
- Time zone: UTC+02:00 (EET)
  - Summer (DST): UTC+03:00 (EEST)
- Website: www.hausjarvi.fi

Hausjärvi (Finnish: ['hɑu̯sˌjærʋi]) is a municipality of Finland. Its seat is in Oitti.

It is part of the Kanta-Häme region. The municipality has a population of 7,862 (31 December 2025) and covers an area of 398.77 square kilometres (153.97 sq mi) of which 8.98 km^{2} (3.47 sq mi) is water. The population density is 20.19 inhabitants per square kilometre (52.3/sq mi).

Geographically, and to some extent politically, Hausjärvi is characterized by its three population centres, Hikiä (population 1,055), Oitti (population 1,855) and Ryttylä (population 1,595). The administrative center of the municipality is Oitti, but politically there sometimes emerges debate on which centres should be developed and/or made targets of public investment.

The municipality is unilingually Finnish.

== History ==
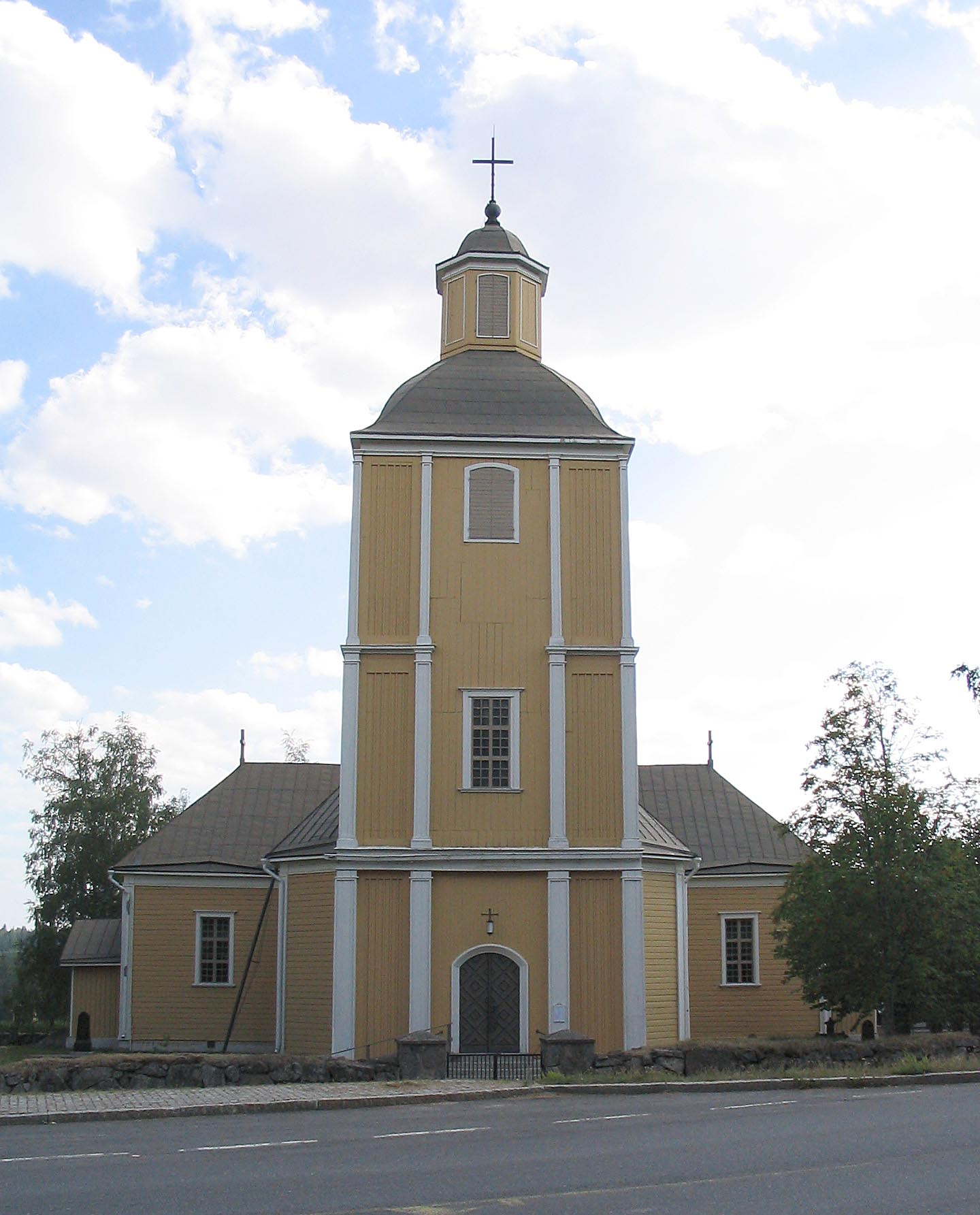
Hausjärvi Church

The establishment of permanent settlement in what is now Hausjärvi is presumed to have begun around the 1300s by hunters from Janakkala. The first estates in Hausjärvi sprung up around river Puujoki, and the inhabitants were known to practice hunting as well as slash-and-burn agriculture. Metsäkansa - as Hausjärvi was known in the era around and preceding the Greater Wrath - was made a distinct chapel parish of the mother parish of Janakkala in 1611, which also prompted the construction of its first church in the same year. Hausjärvi was elevated to the status of an independent parish by imperial proclamation in 1855.

The Helsinki–Hämeenlinna and Riihimäki–Saint Petersburg railways marked a turning point for the sparsely populated municipality. The villages of Hyvinkää and Riihimäki, in particular, benefited heavily from becoming junction stations, and they were granted independence from Hausjärvi as market towns in 1918 and 1922, respectively. Later on, the village of Oitti, aided by its station on the Riihimäki–Lahti section, became the administrative center of the remaining parts of Hausjärvi.

== Geography ==
The first Salpausselkä cuts through Hausjärvi from the southeast to the northeast. It manifests as a wide ridge in the southeast, and reaches a height of 150 metres (490 ft) above sea level around lake Erkylänjärvi. Progressing towards the east, the ridge narrows down around Hikiä and splits in two around Oitti. The southern branch is known as Patastenmäki and reaches 135 metres (443 ft) above sea level. The ridge then decreases in height as it reaches the municipality of Kärkölä in the east. In addition, a fragmented esker reaches from Hikiä to the parish village, Lavinto, Turkhauta and Hämeenlinna, where it is known as Hattelmalanharju.

The most notable river in Hausjärvi is the Puujoki, into which drains lake Pääjärvi in Lammi and Hämeenkoski.

=== Villages ===
In 1967, Hausjärvi had 19 legally recognized villages (henkikirjakylät):

- Erkylä
- Hamina
- Hausjärvi
- Hikiä
- Kara
- Karhi
- Kuru
- Lavinto
- Maitonen
- Oitti
- Puujaa
- Rastila
- Rutajärvi
- Ryttylä
- Selänoja
- Syvänoja
- Torhola
- Turkhauta
- Vantaa

== Demographics ==
In 2020, 17.1% of the population of Hausjärvi was under the age of 15, 60.3% were aged 15 to 64, and 22.6% were over the age of 65. The average age was 44.6, over the national average of 43.4 but under the regional average of 45.4. Speakers of Finnish made up 96.4% of the population and speakers of Swedish made up 0.4%, while the share of speakers of foreign languages was 3.2%. Foreign nationals made up 2.5% of the total population.

The chart below, describing the development of the total population of Hausjärvi from 1975-2020, encompasses the municipality's area as of 2021.

Historical population

Year	Pop.	±% p.a.
1975	7,481	—
1980	7,264	−0.59%
1985	7,434	+0.46%
1990	7,943	+1.33%
1995	8,143	+0.50%

Year	Pop.	±% p.a.
2000	8,107	−0.09%
2005	8,419	+0.76%
2010	8,815	+0.92%
2015	8,729	−0.20%
2020	8,175	−1.30%

Source: Statistics Finland

=== Urban areas ===
In 2019, out of the total population of 8,260, 5,292 people lived in urban areas and 2,897 in sparsely populated areas, while the coordinates of 71 people were unknown. This made Hausjärvi's degree of urbanization 64.6%. The urban population in the municipality was divided between five urban areas as follows:

#	Urban area	Population
1	Oitti	1,855
2	Ryttylä	1,595
3	Hikiä	1,055
4	Hyvinkää central locality	766 (Note: The Hyvinkää central locality has a total population of 43,262, and in addition to Hausjärvi, reaches the town of Hyvinkää (42,496 residents).)
5	Riihimäki central locality	21 (Note: The Riihimäki central locality has a total population of 27,785, and in addition to Hausjärvi, reaches the town of Riihimäki (27,702 residents) as well as the municipality of Loppi (62 residents).)

== Economy ==
In 2018, 9.1% of the workforce of Hausjärvi worked in primary production (agriculture, forestry and fishing), 28.5% in secondary production (e.g. manufacturing, construction and infrastructure), and 60.0% in services. In 2019, the unemployment rate was 5.6%, and the share of pensioners in the population was 26.2%.

The ten largest employers in Hausjärvi in 2019 were as follows:

1. Municipality of Hausjärvi, 401 employees
2. Muurausliike Sami Vanne Oy, 112 employees
3. HTM Yhtiöt Oy, 68 employees
4. Suomen Evankelisluterilainen Kansanlähetys ry, 54 employees
5. Infratek Finland Oy, 39 employees
6. Fescon Oy, 30 employees
7. Parish of Hausjärvi, 26 employees
8. Metsi Oy, 24 employees
9. Riihimäen Seudun Terveyskeskuksen kuntayhtymä, 24 employees
10. Graham Packaging Company Oy, 24 employees

== International relations ==
=== Twin towns – Sister cities ===
- Naie, Japan (since 1995)
- Väike-Maarja Parish, Estonia (since 1989)
