= Anssi Pesonen =

Finnish ice hockey player

- Born: August 7, 1990 (age 34); Janakkala, Finland
- Height: 6 ft 0 in (183 cm)
- Weight: 165 lb (75 kg; 11 st 11 lb)
- Position: Goaltender
- Caught: Left
- Played for: HPK
- NHL draft: Undrafted
- Playing career: 2011–2016

Anssi Pesonen (born August 7, 1990) is a Finnish former ice hockey goaltender.

Pesonen made his SM-liiga debut playing with HPK during the 2011–12 SM-liiga season.
