= Oitti =

Coordinates: 60°47′N 25°02′E

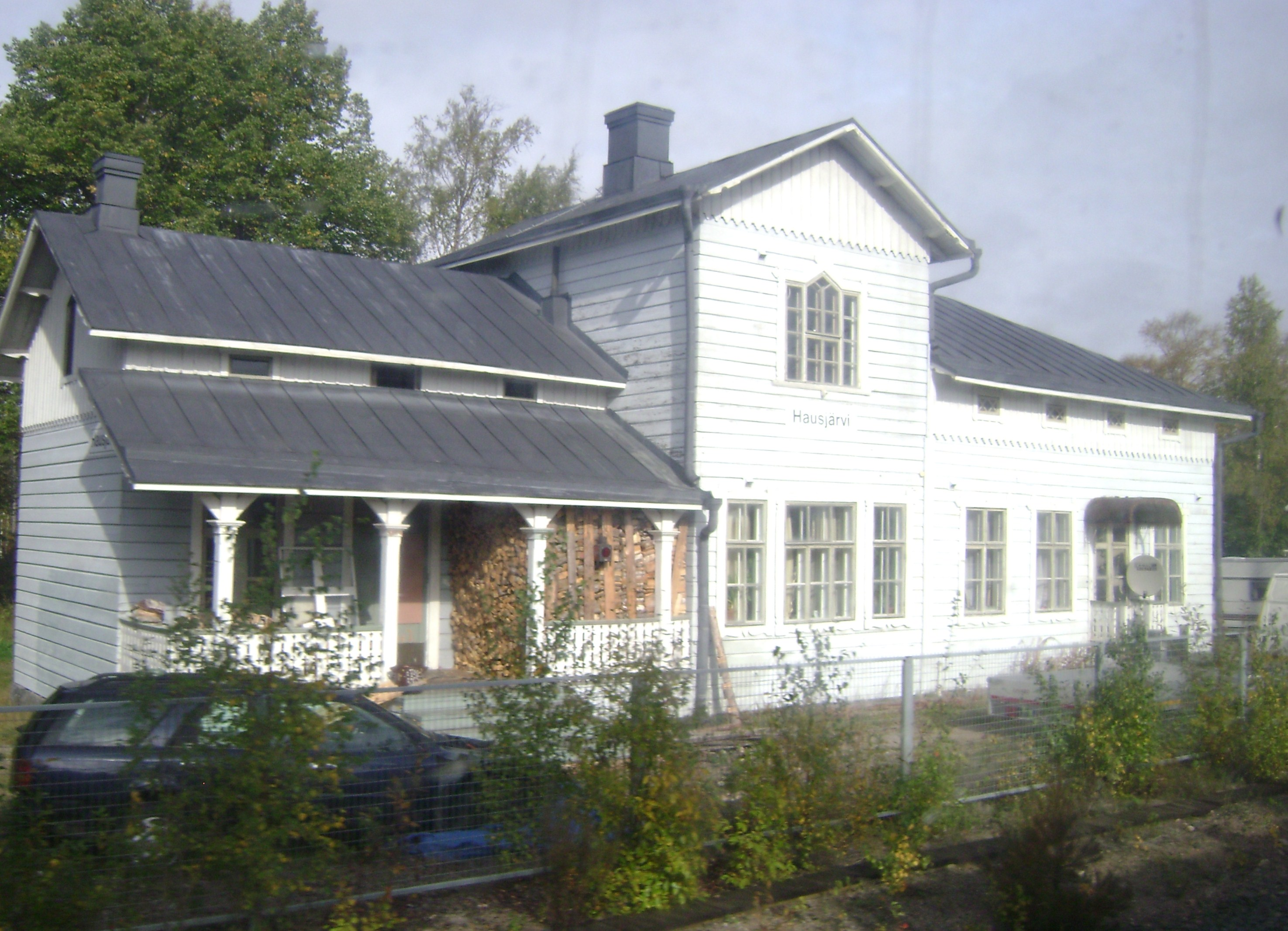
Former railway station in Oitti.

Oitti (Finnish: ['oi̯tːi]) is a village in the municipality of Hausjärvi in Finland with approximately 1,963 residents as of December 31, 2017. Along with Hikiä and Ryttylä, it is one of the population centers of Hausjärvi. As the municipality’s administrative center, it is home to the municipal government office and the Hausjärvi Library.

Oitti is also home to Hausjärvi’s only junior high school and high school. In addition, the village has an elementary school and two day-care centers. Oitti also has 3 grocery stores, a florist, two pizzerias and a train station, the Oitti railway station, which is located along the Riihimäki–Lahti line.

Oitti also has a sports field named after a Finnish athlete Elmer Niklander (1890–1942), who lived in Hausjärvi.

Notable people from Oitti:

- Silva Saarinen (disc golf)
