= Paavo Kaarlehto =

Finnish diplomat

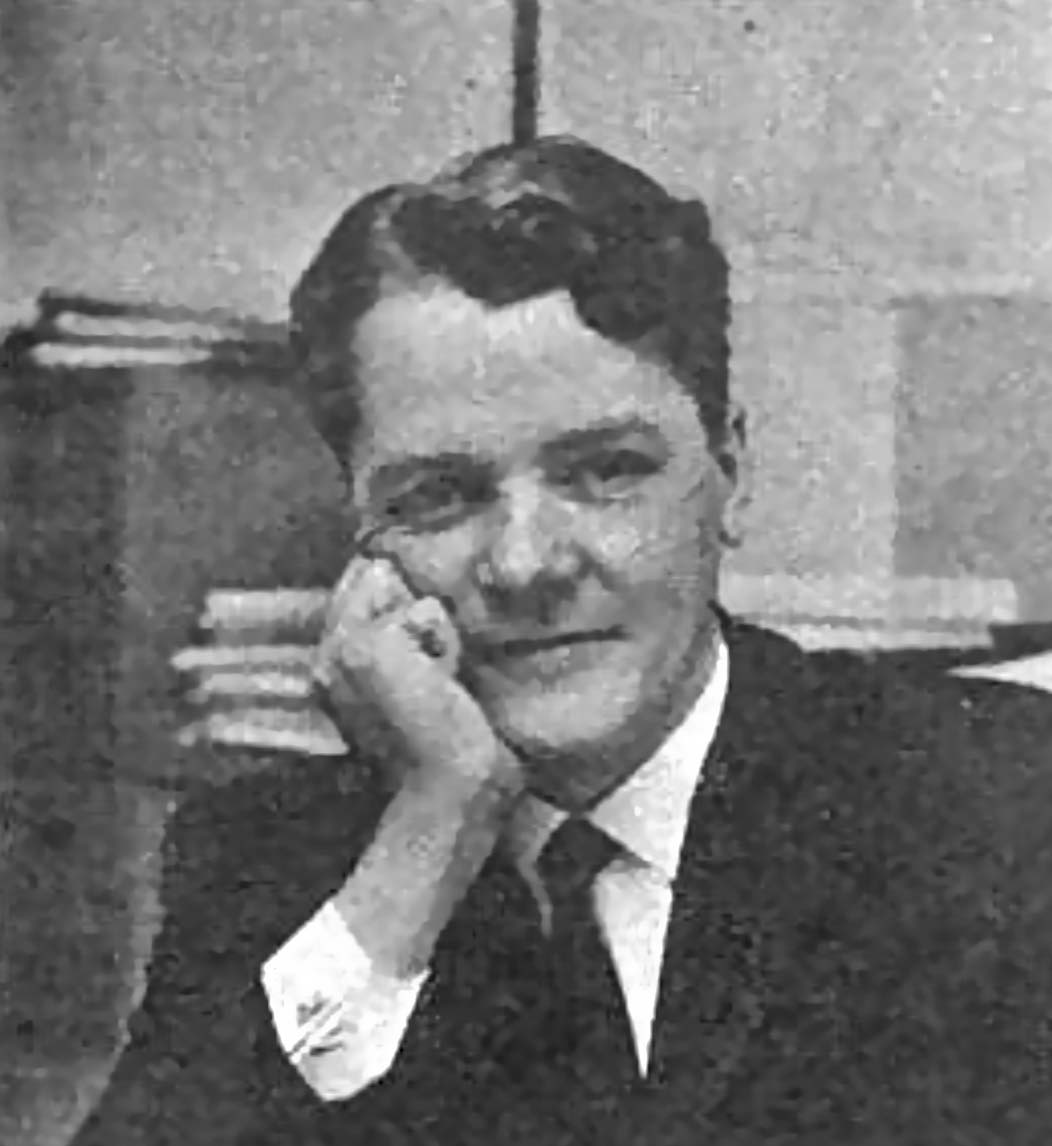
Kaarlehto in 1965

Paavo Hannu Kalervo Kaarlehto (4 August 1928 Janakkala – 22 August 1992 Helsinki) was a Finnish diplomat. He was Deputy Director General of the Ministry for Foreign Affairs 1970–1974, Ambassador in Buenos Aires 1974–1975, Permanent Representative at the United Nations Office in 1975–1981, Ambassador in Brussels 1981–1985, Under-Secretary of State (Commerce Issues) 1985–1990 and Ambassador Bern 1990–1992.

Kaarlehto was considered as a specialist in international agricultural trade and trade policy. In the early 1970s, he served as Finland's chief negotiator during the negotiations in the EEC free trade agreement.
