= Aalberg =

Aalberg is a surname. Notable people with this surname include:

- Espen Aalberg (born 1975), Norwegian jazz musician
- Ida Aalberg (1857–1915), Finnish actress
- John Aalberg (born 1960), American cross-country skier
- John O. Aalberg (1897–1984), sound technician and Academy Award winner
