= Visulahti =

Amusement park in Mikkeli, Finland

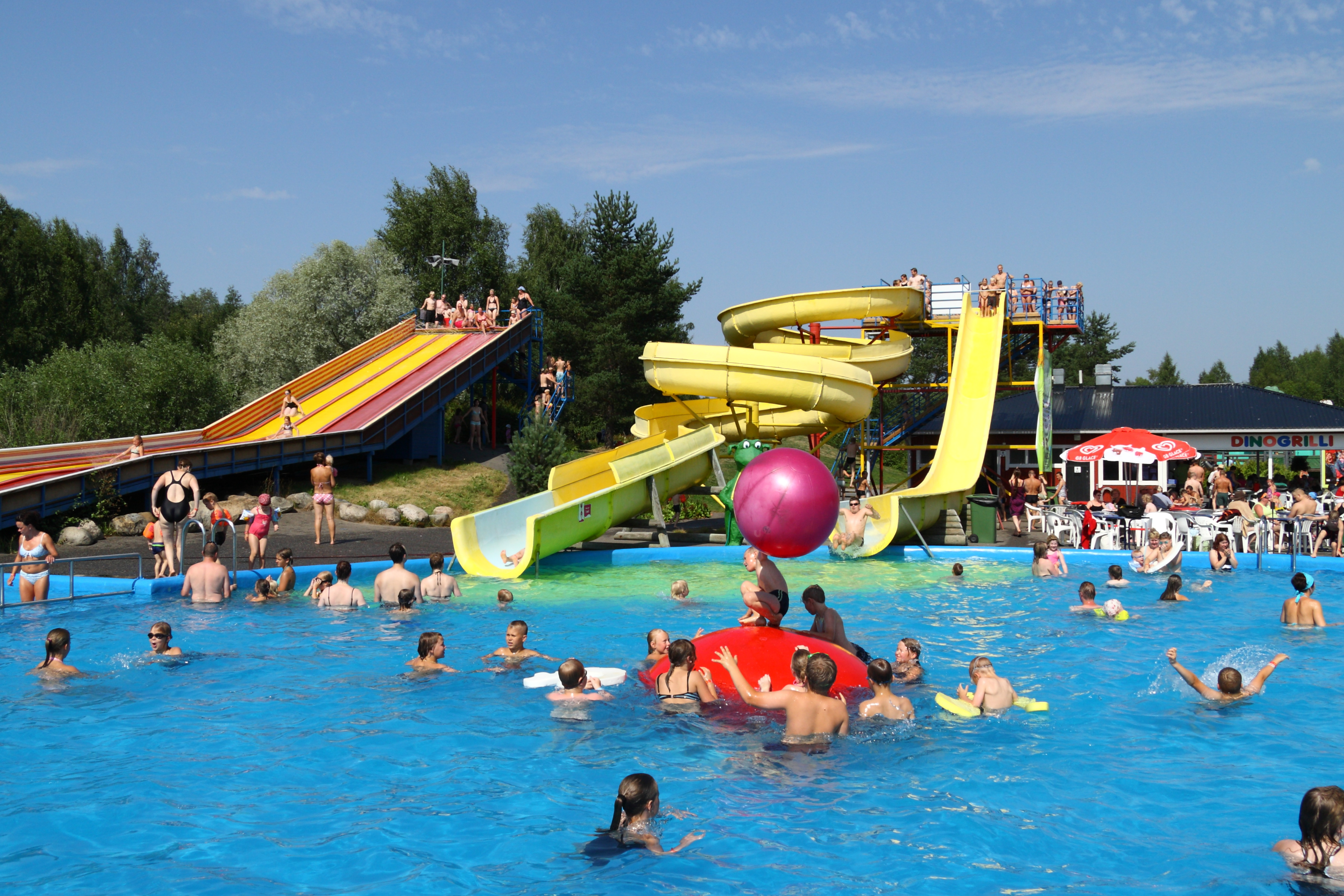
- Dinosauria Water Slides at Visulahti
- Interactive map of Visulahti
- Location: Mikkeli, Finland
- Coordinates: 61°42′03.91″N 027°20′47.37″E
- Opened: 1980
- Owner: Aspro Parks
- Theme: Dinosaurs

Visulahti (Finnish pronunciation: [ˈʋisuˌlɑhti]) is a dinosaur themed amusement park and tourist center opened in 1980 in Mikkeli, Finland, along the Lake Saimaa and the Kuopio Highway. It is similar to Tervakoski's Puuhamaa as there are no traditional amusement park equipment. It consists of three areas: Dinosauria, HyperDino and Visulahti Wax Cabinet. The Dinosauria has two different swimming pools and three large water slides. Visulahti also has accommodation and a camping site. Visulahti is owned by the Spanish Aspro Ocio S.A. through Puuharyhmä Oyj, which it acquired in 2007.
