= Delfortgroup =

Austrian paper industry company

delfort
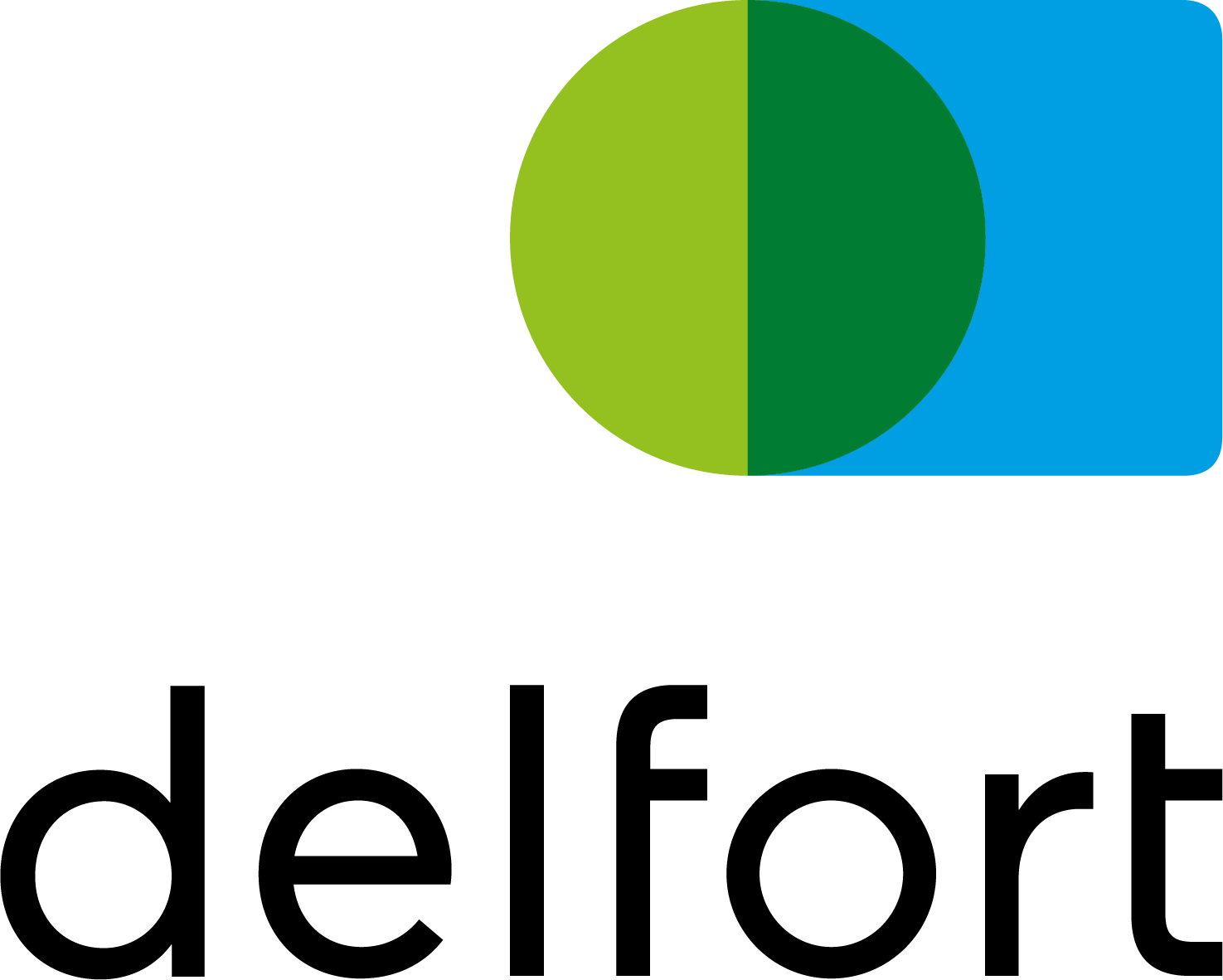
- Industry: Paper industry
- Founded: 2006
- Headquarters: Traun (Linz-Land District), Austria
- Key people: Martin Zahlbruckner, Ilkka Saarinnen, Hannes Kinast
- Revenue: 1,2 billion Euro
- Number of employees: 3500
- Website: www.delfortgroup.com

delfort is a privately owned manufacturer of specialty paper and printed products with headquarters in Traun, Upper Austria. As of 2025, the company employed over 3,300 employees worldwide and operated six mills in Europe and Asia, three converting plants in the US and Mexico, and six sales offices.

== Global operations ==
delfort operated nine subsidiaries across Europe, Asia and the Americas (as of June 2016), manufacturing and converting specialty papers for a number of applications.

delfort’s production sites include:

- Delfortgroup printing services
- Dr. Franz Feurstein
- Dunafin Kft.
- Mundet (USA & Mexico)
- OP Papírna (in Olšany, Czech Republic)
- Tervakoski Oy (in Tervakoski, Finland)
- Wattens Vietnam
- Wattenspapier

In 2016, the company employed around 2,300 people and sold over 9,476 km² of paper in the year 2015. The group's CEO is Martin Zahlbruckner and the CFO and COO is Roland Faihs.

== Specialty paper and printing ==
delfort makes papers for the food and packaging industry, plugwrap, cigarette and tipping base papers for the tobacco industry, base paper for industrial labels, leaflets for the pharmaceutical industry and thinprint papers for religious literature, catalogue and scientific printing, electrical insulation papers for transformers, cables and capacitors, printed products and other specialties.
