= Tervakoski Church =

- Little Church of Tervakoski
- Finnish: Tervakosken kirkko
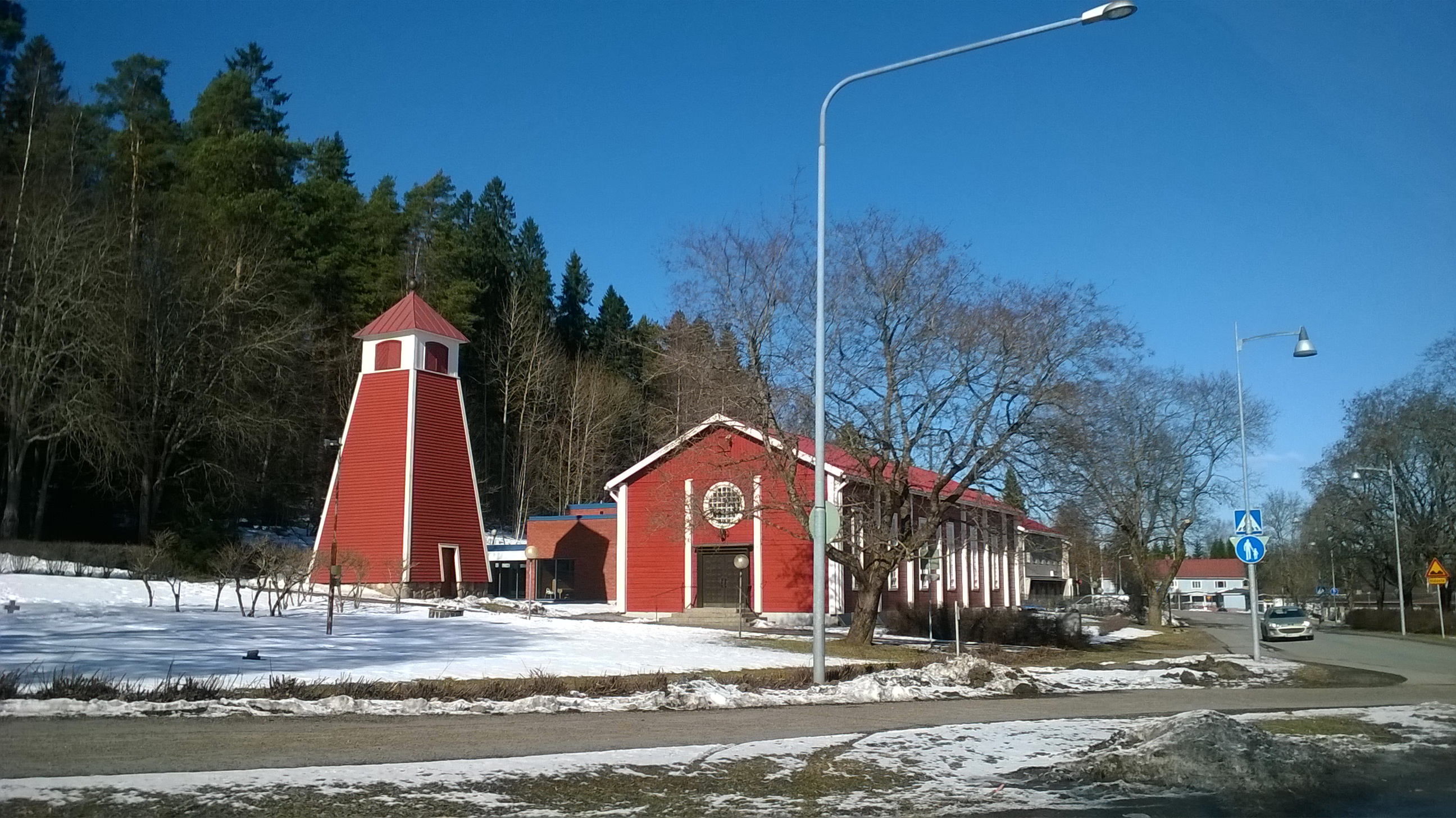
- Tervakoski Church
- 60°48′53.24″N 24°37′30.19″E
- Location: Tervakoski, Janakkala
- Country: Finland
- Website: www.janakkalanseurakunta.fi/kirkot-ja-tilat/tervakoski-church

Architecture
- Architect: Jarl Eklund
- Completed: 1936; 90 years ago

Administration
- Diocese: Tampere
- Parish: Janakkala

The Tervakoski Church (Finnish: Tervakosken kirkko; also known as the Little Church of Tervakoski (Finnish: Tervakosken pikkukirkko), is the 20th-century wooden church located in the village of Tervakoski in the Janakkala municipality in Kanta-Häme, Finland.

== History ==
In 1935, the Tervakoski Little Church Association (Tervakosken pikkukirkkoyhdistys) was founded, the goal of which was to have a church in its own village as well. In the second year of its operation, the Little Church Association built a wooden church designed by architect Jarl Eklund in the middle of the village. The church building was built with the communal work by the villagers. The Tervakoski Paper Mill near the church also supported the construction project.

In 1973, the church came under the ownership and management of the Janakkala Parish.

== See also ==
- Tervakoski Oy
