= Utriainen =

Utriainen is a surname of Finnish origin. Notable people with the surname include:

- Esa Utriainen (born 1953), Finnish javelin thrower
- Jussi Utriainen (born 1978), Finnish long-distance runner
- Raimo Utriainen (1927–1994), Finnish sculptor
- Sanni Utriainen (born 1991), Finnish javelin thrower, daughter of Esa Utriainen
