= Tervakoski Oy =

Finnish paper industry company

Coordinates: 60°48′52″N 24°37′45″E

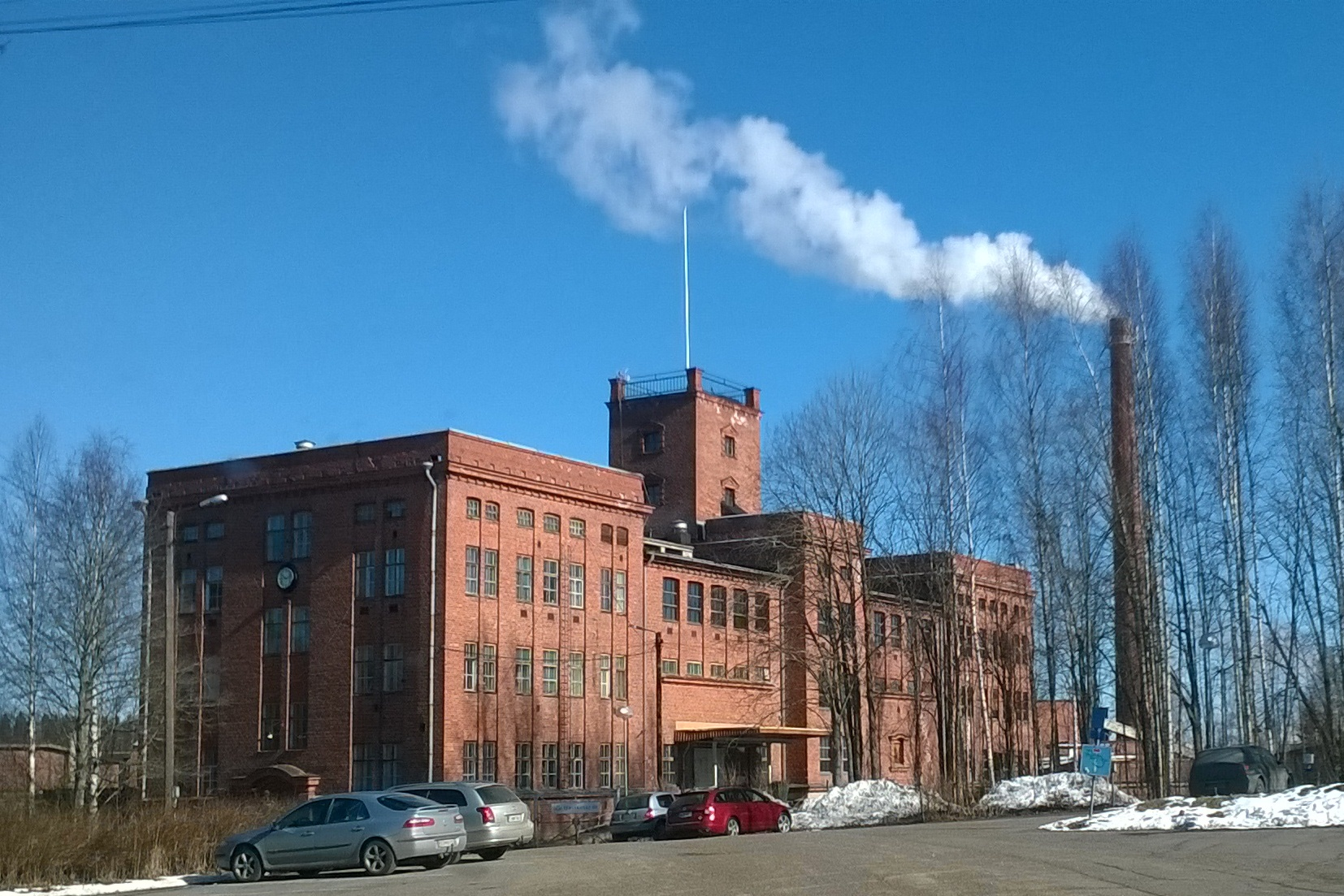
- A paper mill in 2016
- Type: Osakeyhtiö
- Industry: Pulp and paper industry
- Founded: 1818; 208 years ago
- Headquarters: Tervakoski, Janakkala, Finland
- Revenue: €207.9 million (12/2022)
- Owner: delfortgroup (since 1999)
- Website: www.delfortgroup.com

Tervakoski Oy is a Finnish paper industry company. Its paper mill, founded in 1818, is located in the village of Tervakoski in Janakkala, Kanta-Häme. Since 1999, it has been owned by the Austrian company Delfort Group.

By the end of 2022, the company made €207.9 million in turnover and its result was €13 million with the company's net profit percentage being 6.28%.

In the years 1956–1984, the company gained a controversial reputation when a paper mill polluted Tervajoki River and Lake Kernaala with PCB compounds. PCB concentrations are still so high that restrictions have been placed on the use of fish in the lake.

== See also ==
- Forest industry in Finland
- Papermaking
- Tervakoski Church

== Sources ==
=== Further reading ===
- Nykänen, Panu; Paulapuro, Hannu (2005). Telan ympäri - Vuosisata suomalaista paperikone- ja paperinvalmistustekniikkaa (in Finnish). Helsinki: Tekniikan Historian Seura THS ry.
