= Athletics at the 1983 Summer Universiade – Men's javelin throw =

The men's javelin throw event at the 1983 Summer Universiade was held at the Commonwealth Stadium in Edmonton, Canada on 11 July 1983.

== Results ==
Rank	Athlete	Nationality	Result	Notes
1st place, gold medalist(s)	Dainis Kūla	Soviet Union	87.80	
2nd place, silver medalist(s)	Helmut Schreiber	West Germany	84.12	
3rd place, bronze medalist(s)	Stanisław Górak	Poland	83.20	
4	Einar Vilhjálmsson	Iceland	82.48	
5	Sergey Gavras	Soviet Union	81.46	
6	Zakayo Malekwa	Tanzania	79.06	
7	Laslo Babits	Canada	77.80	
8	Mike Brennan	Canada	75.12	
9	Perry Puccetti	United States	73.04	
10	Agostino Ghesini	Italy	71.74	
11	Nirmal Singh	India	65.18	
12	John Amabile	United States	63.70	
13	Carlos Cunha	Portugal	61.54	
