= Puuhamaa =

Amusement park in Tervakoski, Finland

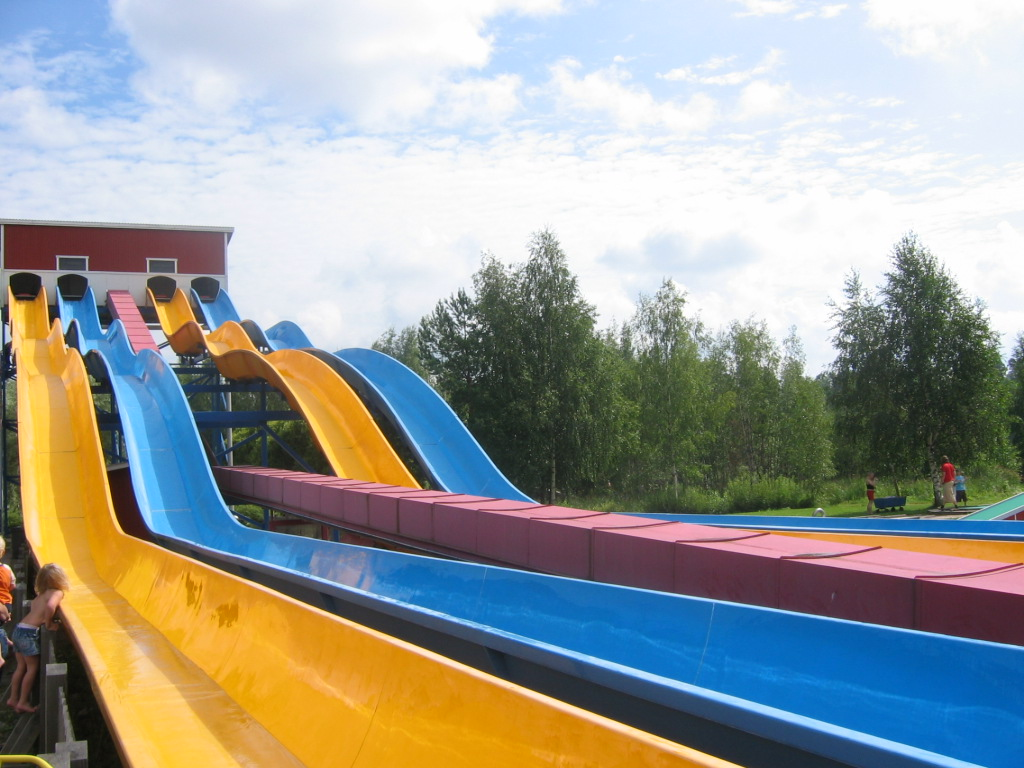
- "Victoria Falls" water slides in Puuhamaa
- Interactive map of Puuhamaa
- Location: Tervakoski, Finland
- Coordinates: 60°48′27″N 024°36′45″E
- Opened: 1984
- Owner: Aspro Parks

Puuhamaa (Finnish pronunciation: [ˈpuːhɑˌmɑː]) is an amusement park opened in 1984 in the village of Tervakoski, in the municipality of Janakkala, Finland. Like Mikkeli's Visulahti, instead of electrical rides, it mainly offers things to do for children: slides and waterslides, bouncy castles, race tracks, etc. It also has a minigolf course and a video arcade. Its attendance peaks at roughly 5,000 children a day. The park has an entrance fee, but all its features are free.
