= Leppäkoski =

Village in Janakkala, Finland

Coordinates: 60.863333°N 24.706389°E

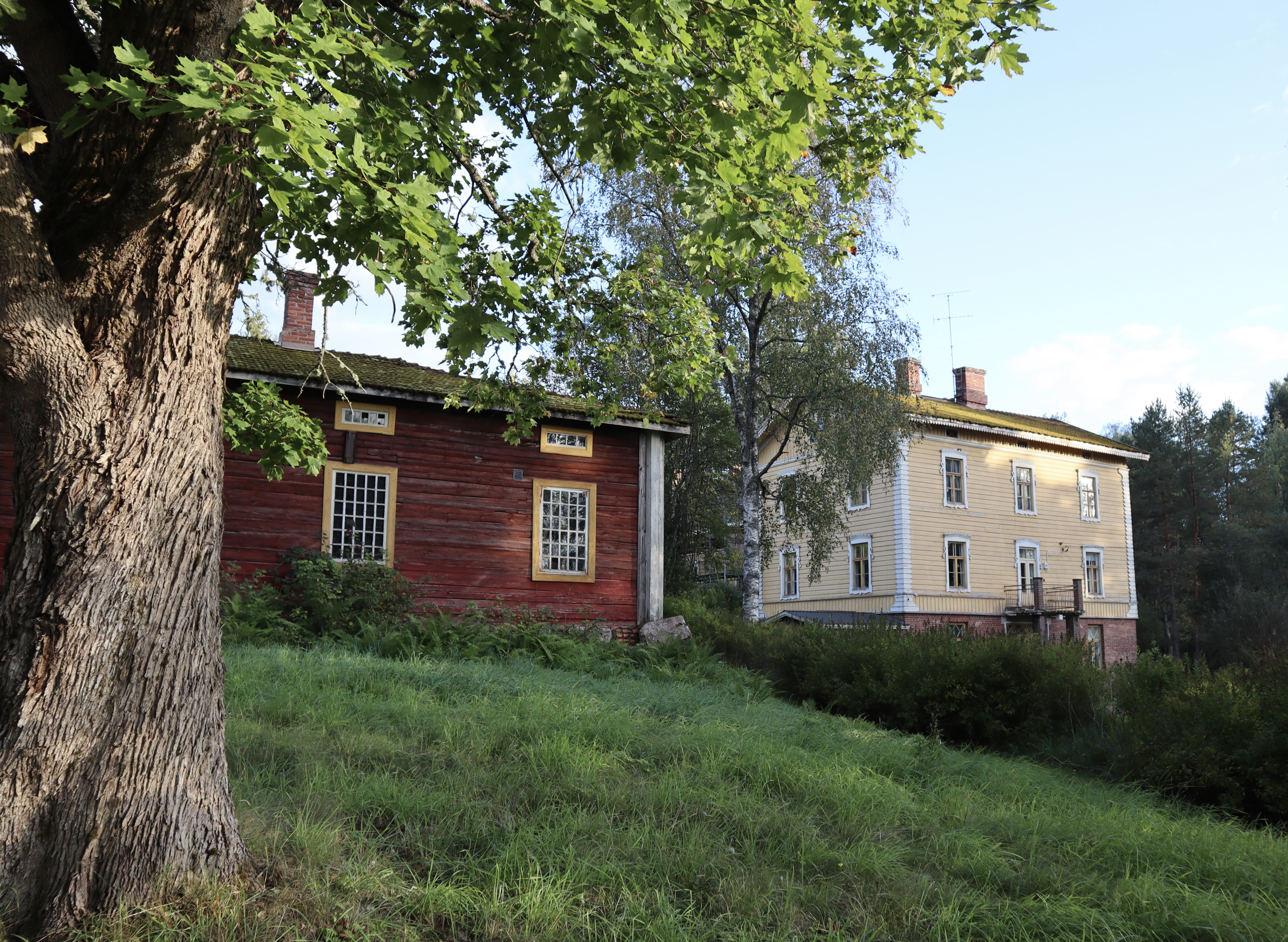
Buildings of the Leppäkoski Manor

Leppäkoski (Finnish pronunciation: [ˈlepːæˌkoski]; lit. 'alder rapids') is a village in Janakkala, Finland. In 2023, there were about 300 inhabitants.

The village has two schools: Leppäkoski School and Haukankallio Special School. The nearest grocery store located in Hausjärvi's Ryttylä is 7 kilometres (4.3 mi) away, while Leppäkoski's own services are limited to a summer kiosk owned by the sports club Woima.

The Puujoki River flows through the village, with its rapids located near the Leppäkoski Manor. Leppäkoski is also located along the Finnish Main Line, which was completed in 1862, but trains have not stopped at the station since 1981.

== See also ==
- Ida Aalberg – Finnish actress born in Leppäkoski
- Tervakoski – another village in Janakkala
