= Emil Aaltonen =

Finnish industrialist and philanthropist (1869-1949)

Vuorineuvos Emil Aaltonen
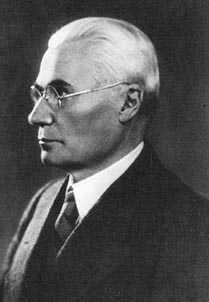
- Born: Emil Widell; 29 August 1869; Sääksmäki, Grand Duchy of Finland
- Died: 16 December 1949 (aged 80); Tampere, Finland
- Occupations: Industrialist, philanthropist
- Spouse: Olga Malinen (m. 1896)

Emil Aaltonen (né Widell until 1890; b. 29 August 1869 — d. 16 December 1949) was a prominent Finnish industrialist and philanthropist, who owned and ran one of the largest shoe manufacturing businesses of the time in the Nordic region.

== Early life ==
Emil Widell was born in Sääksmäki (today part of Valkeakoski) to a farming family of modest means, as the third of seven children. The family lost their farm in the aftermath of the Finnish famine of 1866–68, and Emil's father had to take a job as a railway worker. He died relatively young, leaving his widow to care for the children. Consequently the young Emil was expected also to contribute to the household, and started as a shoemaker's apprentice at the age of 13. By age 19, he had qualified as a master craftsman, and set up his own workshop in the town of Hattula.

Widell changed his original Swedish surname to the Finnish Aaltonen in 1890, as was common during the Finnicization of names in the late 19th and early 20th century.

== Business career ==
=== Footwear ===
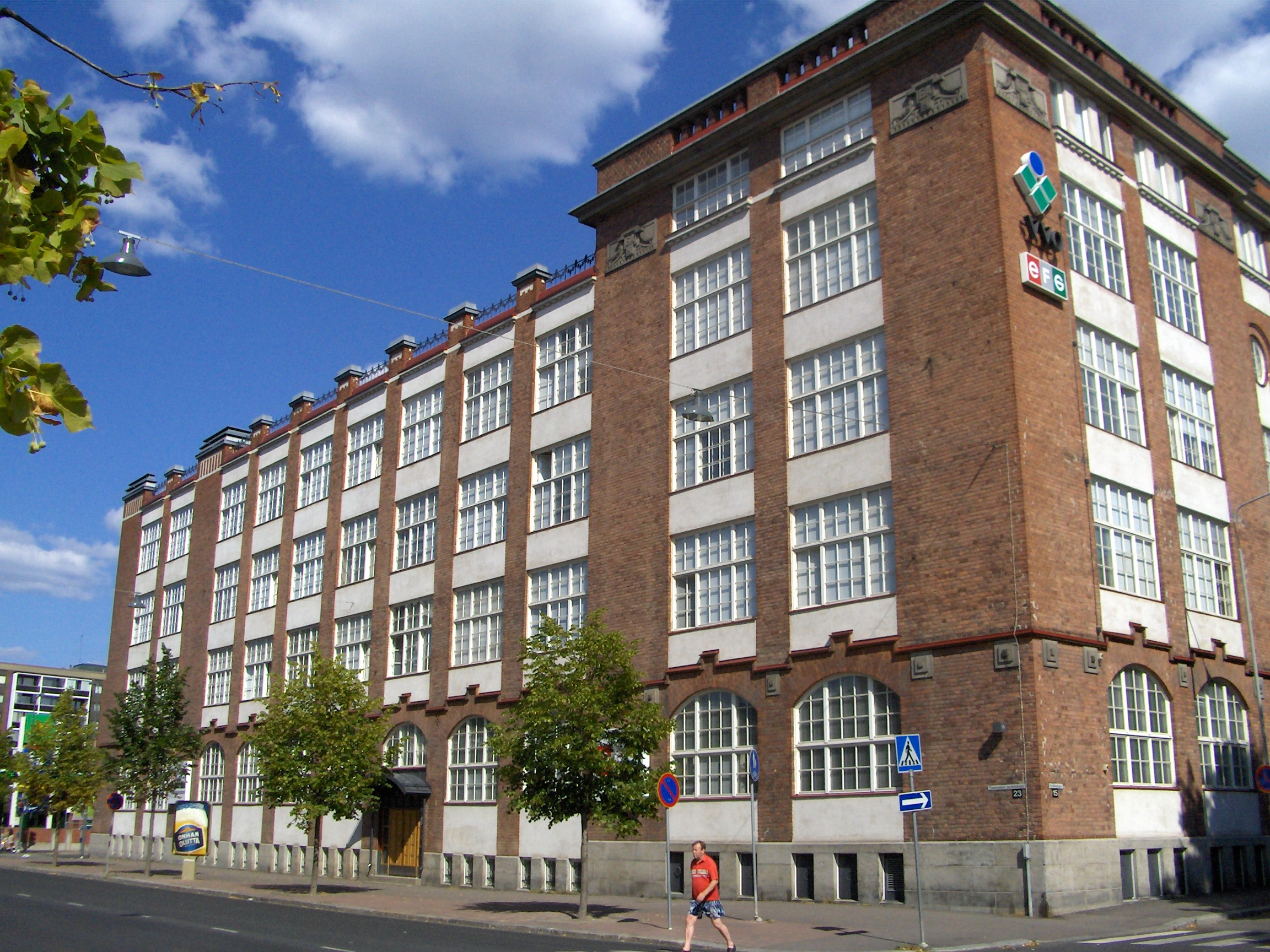
The factory building of Aaltosen Kenkätehdas in Tampere, seen in 2006

During the 1890s Aaltonen's workshop gradually grew and, after his marriage in 1896 to Olga (née Malinen), the product range was upon her initiative expanded from shoes to other leather products.

In 1902, Aaltonen purchased a used American shoe production line and set up his first industrial business, the Hattulan Jalintehdas factory.

In 1905, however, when the factory burned down and Olga died shortly afterwards, Aaltonen is known to have considered giving up business altogether. In the end, he moved with his two young daughters to the industrial city of Tampere, where he set up a new manufacturing business, Tampereen Kenkätehdas. Within a year of starting, the factory employed over 100 staff and produced 20,000 pairs of shoes.

In 1917, the business was restructured as a limited company, and renamed Aaltosen Kenkätehdas Osakeyhtiö. The operation employed one-third of all shoe manufacturing staff in the country at the time. The business continued to grow, acquiring competitors and setting up supply chain operations in leather production and shoe colour manufacturing. The company was awarded Gold Medal at the 1929 Barcelona International Exposition, and by the end of the 1930s its product range covered 4,500 models and the operation employed over 1,300 staff. It was the largest shoe manufacturing business of its day in the Nordics.

Aaltonen retired from the day-to-day running of his businesses in 1947, at the age of 78.

He is particularly remembered as a pioneer of shoe manufacturing in Finland.

=== Other manufacturing ===
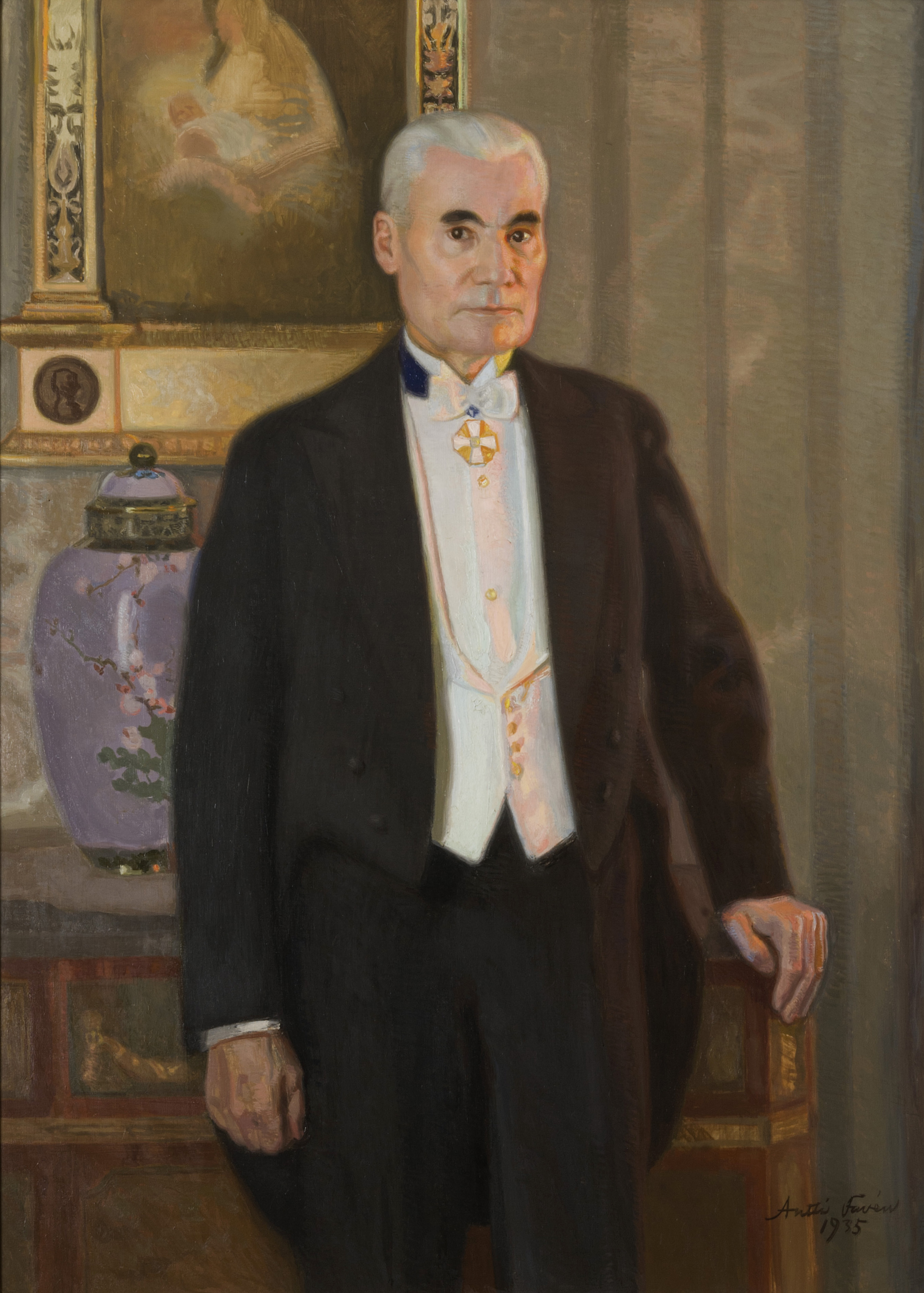
Portrait of Emil Aaltonen (1935), by Antti Favén)

In 1915, Aaltonen had invested in a new steam locomotive manufacturer, Lokomo, and by the mid-1920s he owned it almost entirely. Fuelled by Finland's industrialisation and military procurement, the business grew and expanded into new product lines, eventually employing 1,300 staff.

In 1921, Aaltonen had invested in another new business, Sarvis, the first manufacturer of plastic (galalith) products in Finland, located in the Hatanpää district. The company was not profitable and after some years the other shareholders exited the venture, leaving Aaltonen owning nearly all the shares. He managed to turn the business around and grow it into a successful and profitable manufacturer, diversifying into new materials and product lines.

Aaltonen was also a shareholder in a textile business, set up in 1921 in Nokia under the name Nokian Kutomo ja Värjäys. Today it is known as Nanso Group and owned by Aaltonen's descendants.

=== Agriculture ===
Despite his success in business, Aaltonen did not feel that manufacturing was his true calling; instead, he dreamed of being a farmer, and spent his spare time planning how to acquire a farm and grow and develop it to prosperity. When he eventually purchased a farm, his first attempt was not successful, but in 1917 he managed to acquire from the aristocratic von Qvanten family their 17th-century, 2,000 hectares (4,900 acres) Ylikartano mansion in Mäntsälä, which he enthusiastically and systematically developed into a large-scale, successful dairy farming operation. Aaltonen also found synergies between his businesses, for example he used the milk produced at Ylikartano as the raw material for the galalith production of Sarvis.

== Philanthropy ==
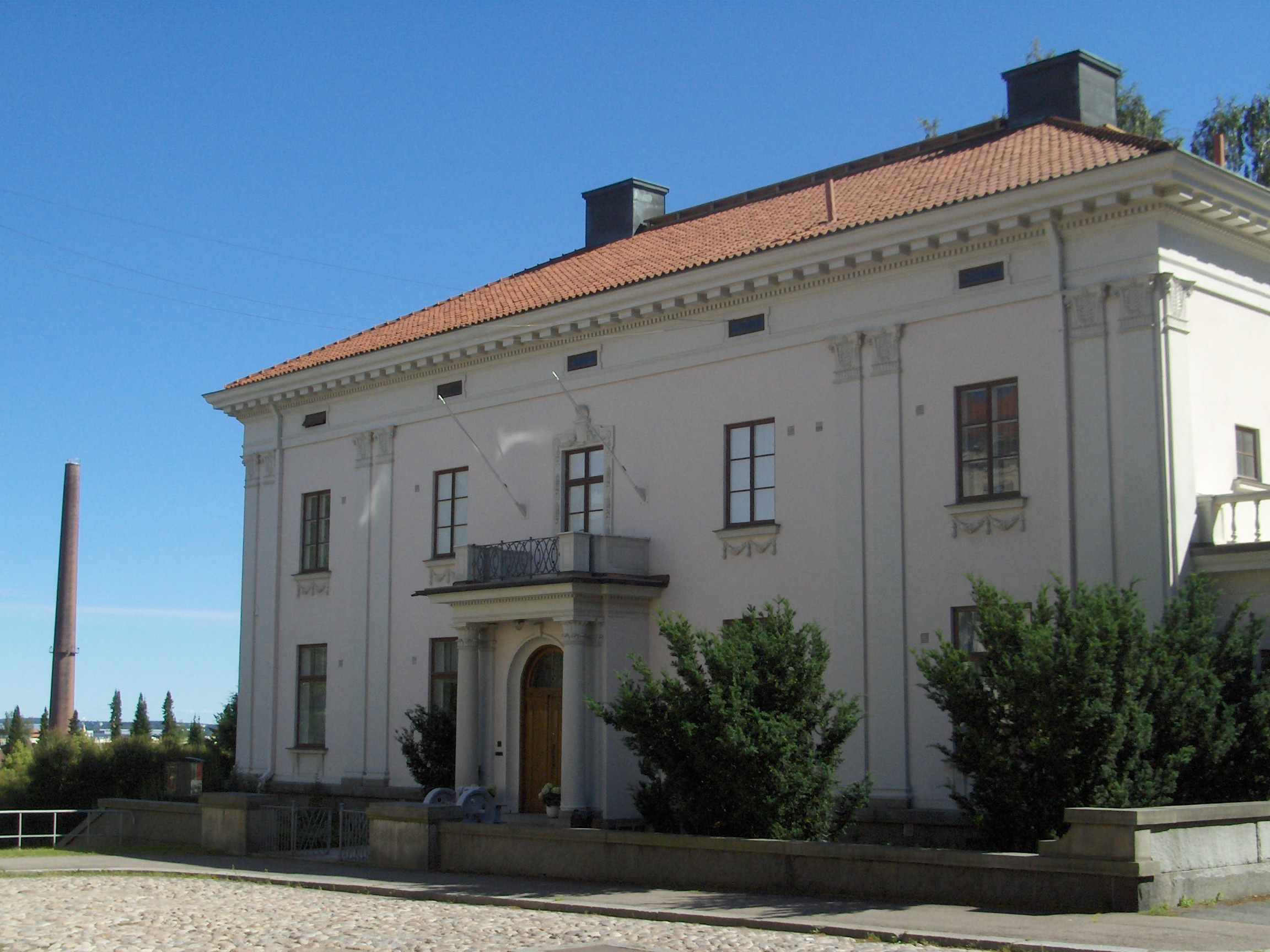
Pyynikinlinna

Aaltonen's philanthropic ideas were evident from early on, as he built housing for his factory workers, and provided subsidised loans to those who wanted instead to purchase their own properties.

He also believed that economic success was only possible in a society with high standards of culture and welfare, and from the outset he was determined to donate some of the profits from his business ventures to fund the development of Finnish cultural initiatives.

In 1937, Aaltonen established the Emil Aaltonen Foundation (Emil Aaltosen Säätiö), to support scientific research. The foundation awards over EUR 6m annually, with total grants awarded to date exceeding EUR 120m in today's money, and is regarded as a major player in the Finnish science funding landscape.

Today the foundation among other things owns and operates the Emil Aaltonen Museum, housed in the Pyynikinlinna (lit. 'Pyynikki Castle') mansion in Tampere, which Aaltonen had purchased in 1932 for his family's home. Aaltonen began acquiring art already in the 1910s, with particular interest in early Finnish paintings, eventually accumulating c. 250 pieces, and his purchase of Pyynikinlinna was also intended to house his collection, some of which is now on public display there.

As a thank-you to his adopted home city of Tampere, Aaltonen donated the founding capital for the city's municipal library. He also made major donations to the University of Turku, as well as funding the construction and renovation of several churches.

== Honours ==
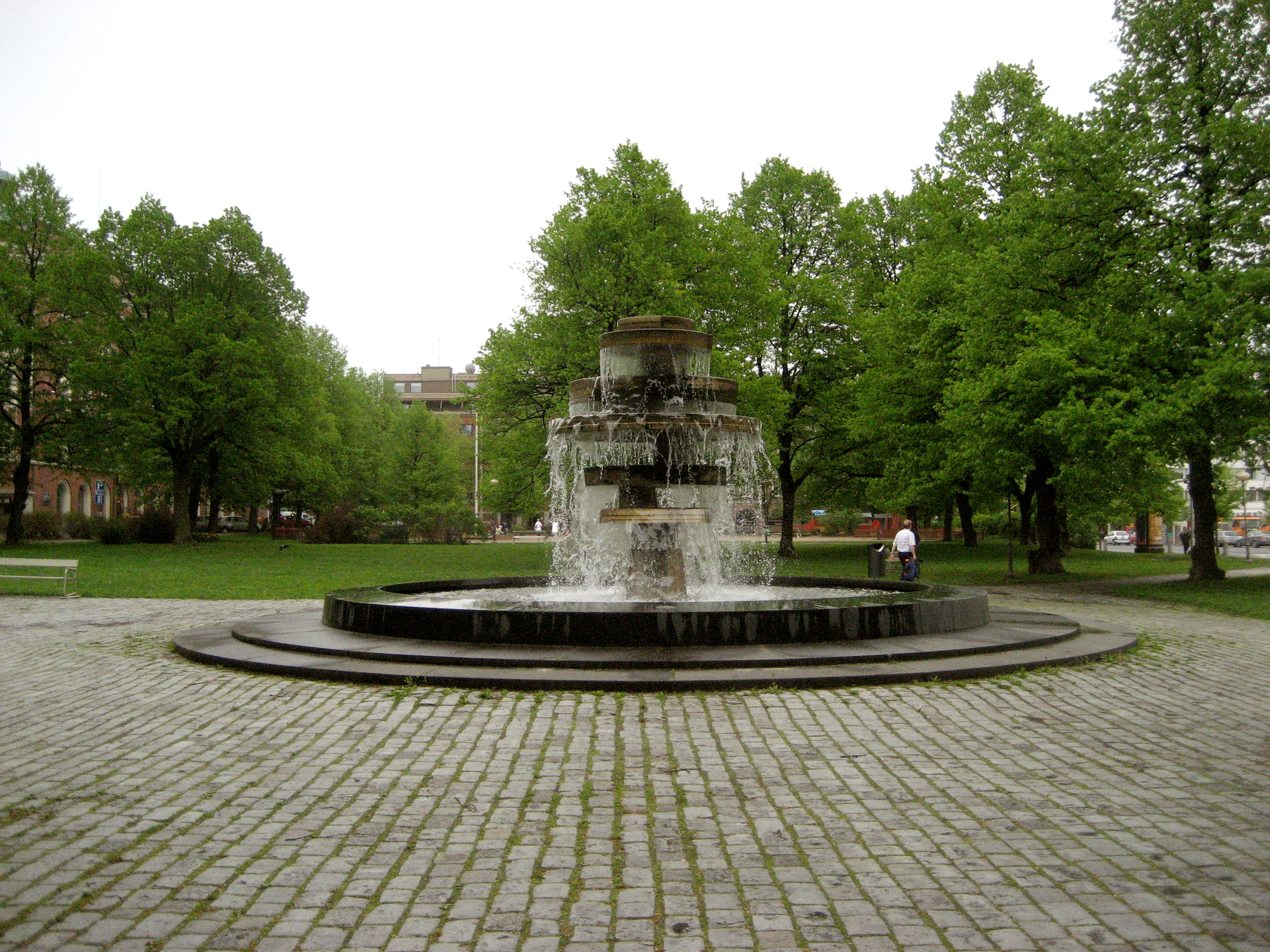
Emil Aaltonen Memorial

In 1921, Aaltonen was granted the honorary title of Kauppaneuvos by the first President of Finland, K.J. Ståhlberg.

In 1935, he was granted the highest title, Vuorineuvos, by President Kyösti Kallio.

A park in central Tampere, on one side of which is located the original Aaltosen Kenkätehdas building, has been named after him as Emil Aaltosen puisto. Situated within the park is the Emil Aaltonen Memorial (Emil Aaltosen muistomerkki), a 4.5 metres (15 ft) tall fountain sculpture designed by Raimo Utriainen and manufactured at the Lokomo factory, revealed in August 1969 to mark the 100th anniversary of Aaltonen's birth.

== Personal life ==
In addition to his artistic and agricultural interests, Aaltonen was a keen amateur astronomer.

Aaltonen's considerable wealth is today held in trusts and foundations for public benefit, much of it administered by his family members.
