= Raimo Utriainen =

Finnish sculptor (1927-1994)

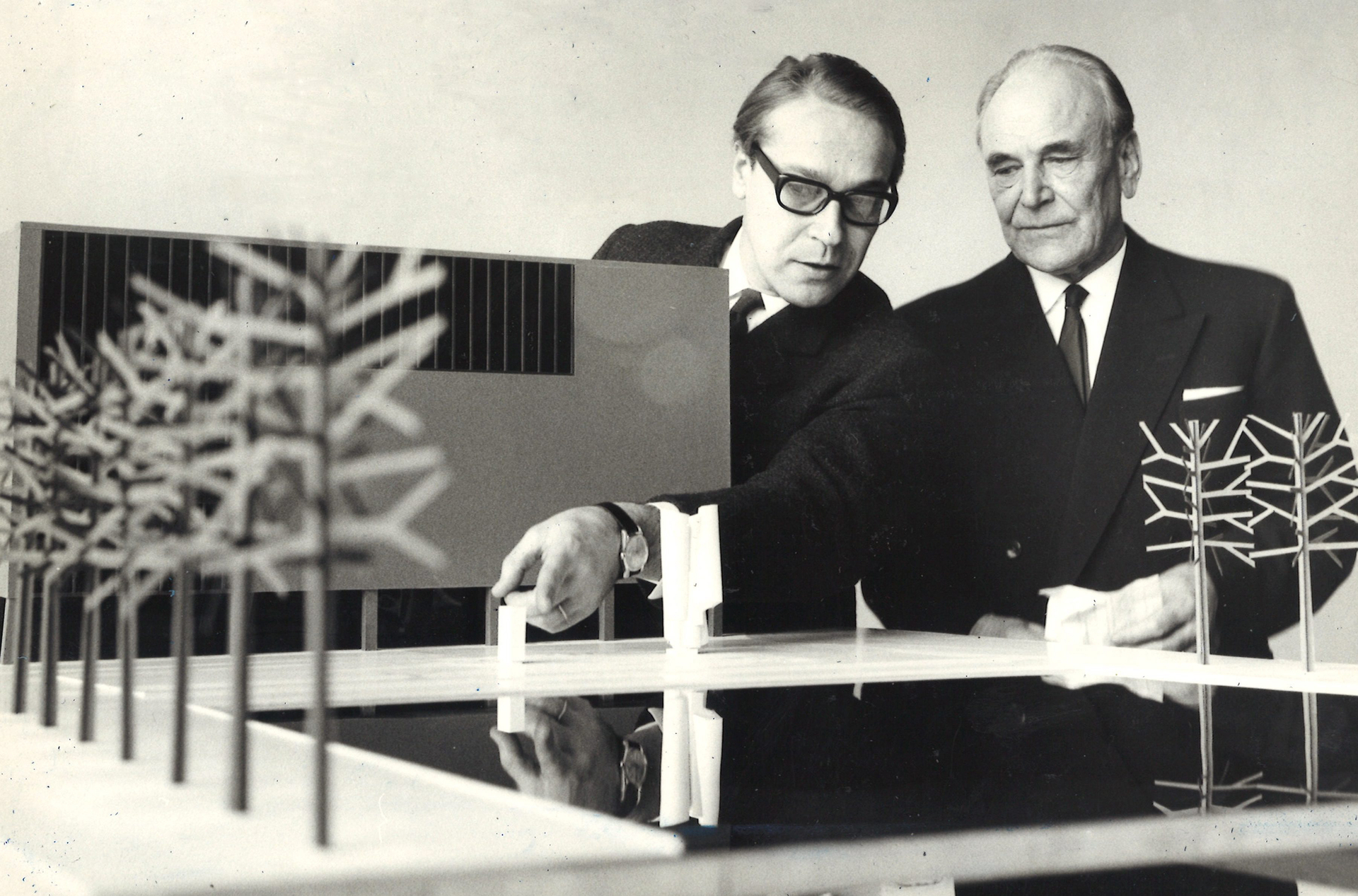
Utriainen (left) with Professor Wuorenrinne, studying a scale model of Utriainen's memorial to Ida Aalberg

Raimo Utriainen (24 September 1927 in Kuopio – 27 April 1994 in Helsinki) was a Finnish visual artist, best known as a modernist sculptor and a moderniser of Finnish sculpture.

== Biography ==
Utriainen initially studied mathematics at the University of Turku, while also attending art classes. He later moved to Helsinki, and switched to studying architecture at the Helsinki University of Technology. Later still, he transferred to the Academy of Fine Arts (now part of the University of the Arts Helsinki) to study art. This mathematical and architectural training influenced much of his later works.

Utriainen was twice married and divorced, and had three children.

In 1993, shortly before his death, Utriainen established an art foundation, which awards annual grants to support young sculptors.

== Artistic career ==
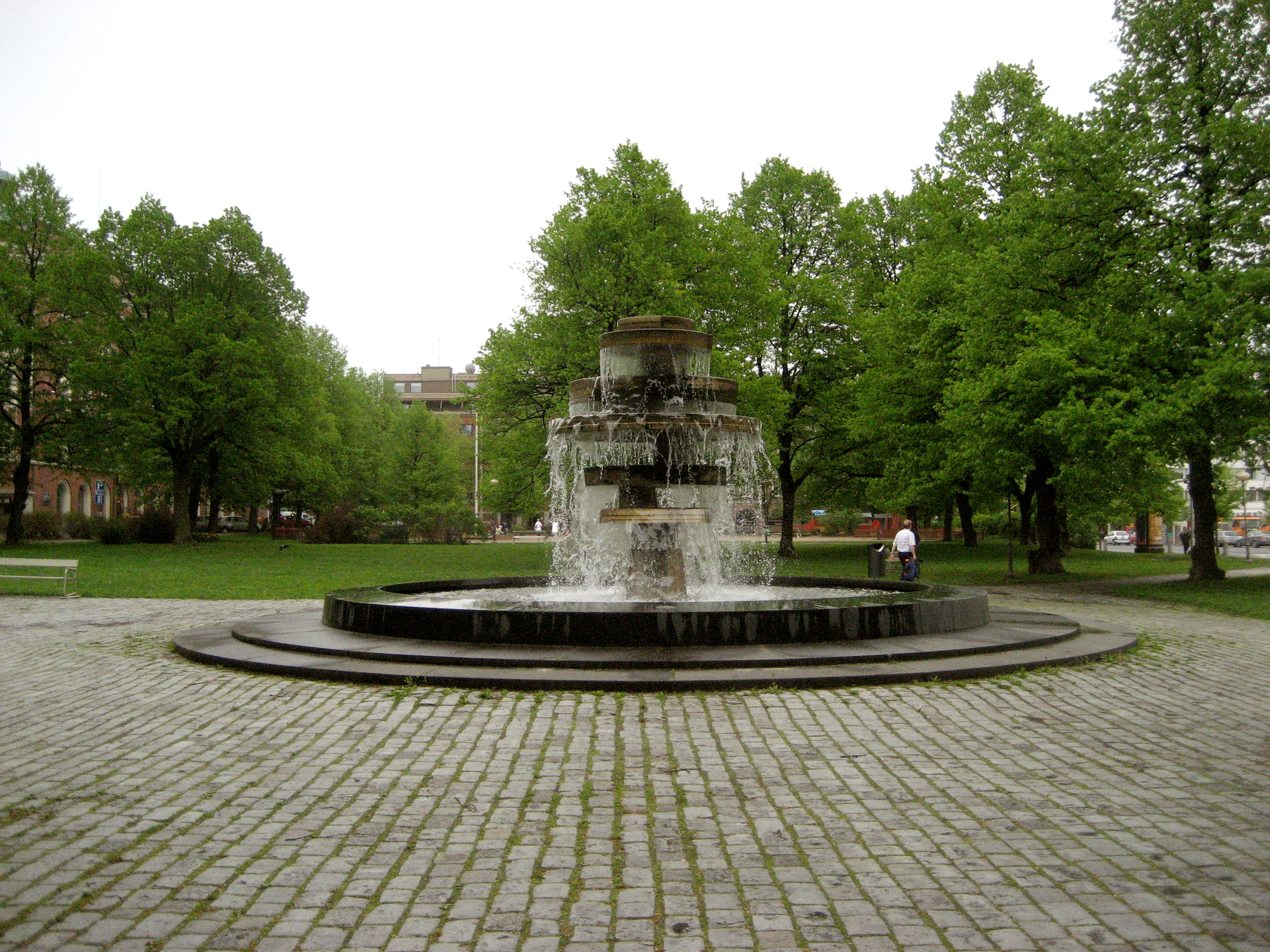
Emil Aaltonen Memorial, a fountain sculpture by Utriainen, located in Tampere

Utriainen began his career as a painter, working in Helsinki and Paris in the 1950s, with mostly figurative art works. Gradually his style became more abstract, and by the early 1970s he was working in the modernist style and using 'industrial' materials and methods.

Utriainen exhibited internationally as part of collections of modern Finnish art, in Sweden, West Germany, France, Poland and the United States. His most notable solo exhibitions were in Finland, as well as two invitational tours of Japan in the late 1970s and early 1980s. His works are in permanent collections in art museums in Finland, including at the Ateneum art museum of the Finnish National Gallery, as well as internationally.

His work has been described as mathematical, kinetic, and plain.

He is recognised as a moderniser of Finnish sculpture: for example, his 1972 sculpture Esirippu ('Front curtain'), celebrating the actress Ida Aalberg, is considered the first fully modernist personal memorial in Finland. Utriainen's main body of work consists of monumental sculptures utilising strict mathematical shapes and themes, often large-scale and designed for public places, and usually made of metal (especially steel and aluminium).

== Honours ==
In 1980, Utriainen was awarded the Pro Finlandia medal of the Order of the Lion of Finland.

In the same year, he was named the Helsinki Festival 'Artist of the Year'.

Also in 1980, Utriainen was granted the honorary title of Professor.
