= Ida Aalberg =

Finnish actress (1857–1915)

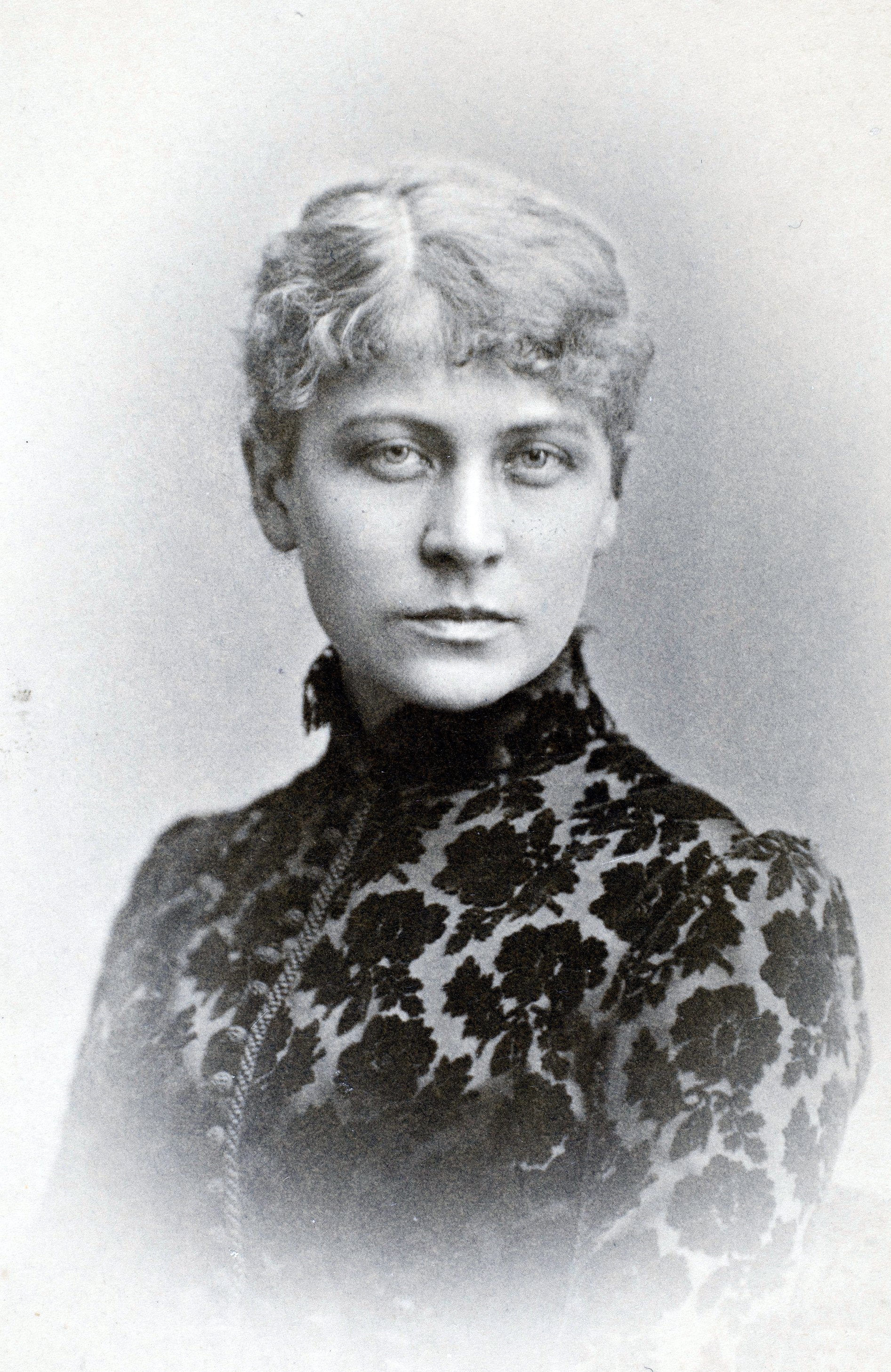
- Aalberg in 1880
- Born: 4 December 1857; Leppäkoski, Janakkala, Grand Duchy of Finland, Russian Empire
- Died: 17 January 1915 (aged 57); Saint Petersburg, Russian Empire
- Occupation: Actress

Ida Aalberg (4 December 1857 – 17 January 1915) was the most notable and internationally known Finnish actress of her time.

== Biography ==
Aalberg was born in Leppäkoski, Janakkala. She was a member of the Theatre of Finland from 1874 to 1883 and later a regular visiting actress. She also performed on foreign scenes, in Scandinavia, Germany, Hungary and Russia among others. Although she never managed a breakthrough in a foreign language she remained respected and highly popular in Finland, even when spending much, or nearly all of her time abroad.

A new theatre house that opened in 1902 led to the renaming of the Theatre of Finland as The Finnish National Theatre. A few years later Aalberg began to show an interest in directing and administration which lead to her appointment as director-actor (assistant manager) in 1909.

She was not a success as a director. When her contract was terminated in 1911 it caused a cultural scandal and she was never to perform regularly in the National Theatre again. She celebrated her 40-year anniversary as an actress there in 1914 and a visiting performance was being planned but her sudden death in January 1915 in Saint Petersburg came before the plans could be carried out. She is buried in the Hietaniemi Cemetery in Helsinki.

Aalberg's first marriage was to a well-known Finnish nationalist Lauri Kivekäs (fennoman) from 1887 until his death in 1893, and the second in 1894 to Baron Alexander Uexküll-Gyllenband from St Petersburg, who was a lawyer and philosopher and later became an influential person in the Finnish theatre scene.

== Legacy ==
On the other side of The Finnish National Theatre, in Kaisaniemi Park, there is a monument called The Curtain, designed by sculptor Raimo Utriainen and raised in memory of Ida Aalberg in 1972. Being the first abstract sculpted monument ever planned in Finland it caused a huge uproar by winning the competition in 1961.

The city of Helsinki has named a street in memory of Ida Aalberg in Pohjois-Haaga, and she has also been featured on a Finnish Postage stamp.

The birth home of Ida Aalberg is located in Leppäkoski in the municipality of Janakkala and serves as the Ida Aalberg museum. The library of Janakkala is also named after her and is sited on Ida Aalberg Plaza.

Finnish actress Kyllikki Forssell played a small part as Ida Aalberg in the movie Poet and Muse by Jaakko Pakkasvirta (1978). The movie tells the story of another famous Finn, the poet Eino Leino.

=== Ida Aalberg Foundation and Ida Aalberg Society ===
The memory of Ida Aalberg is kept alive by the Ida Aalberg Foundation in Helsinki (1957) and the Ida Aalberg Society in Janakkala (1985).

Ida Aalberg Foundation awards a biannual Ida Aalberg Acting Prize, which is the largest single prize in the theatre in Finland (15000 euros in 2007). In 1959 the Foundation announced an open competition for a monument and after various phases, including a follow-up competition, commissioned from sculptor Raimo Utriainen his winning work, The Curtain. It took 15 years from the initial idea in 1957 - centennial of Ida Aalberg's birth - until the monument was finally put up.

== Gallery ==
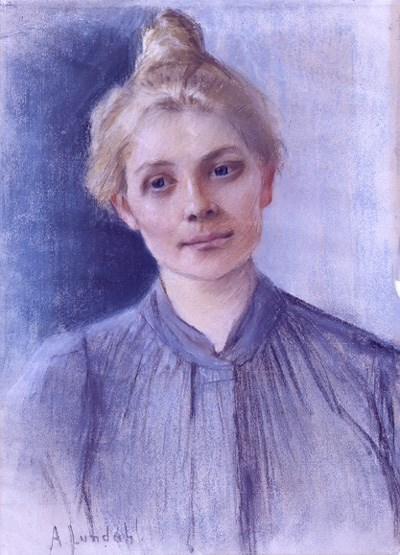
Portrait of Aalberg by Amélie Lundahl in 1890

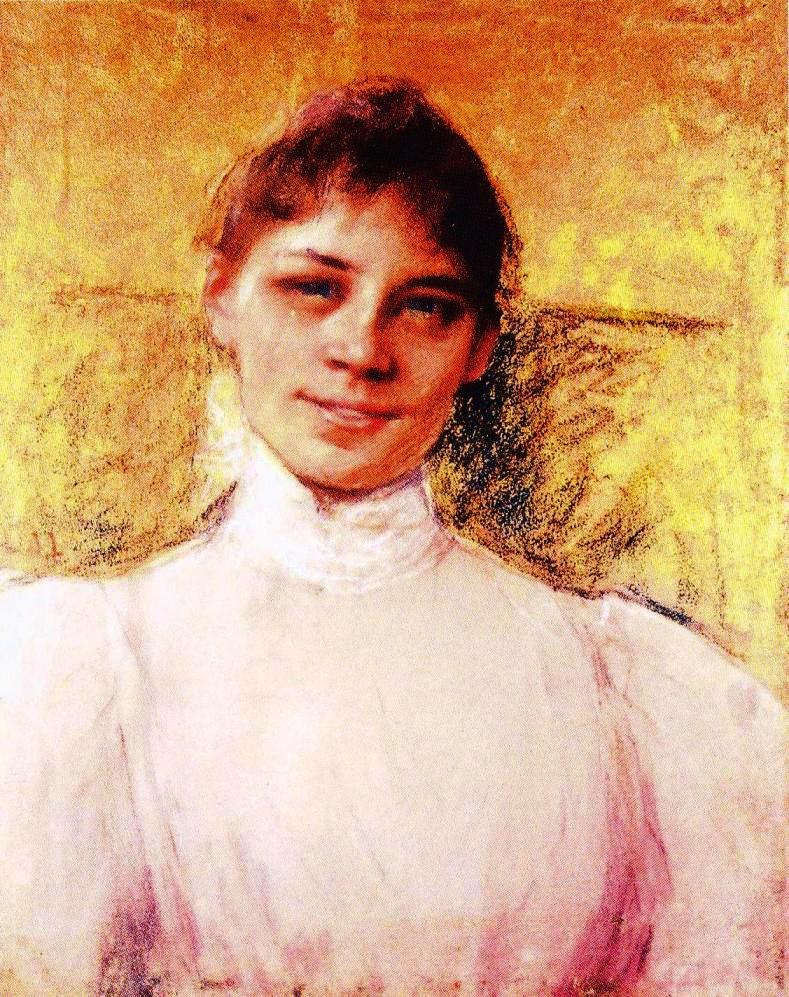
Portrait by Lundahl in 1892

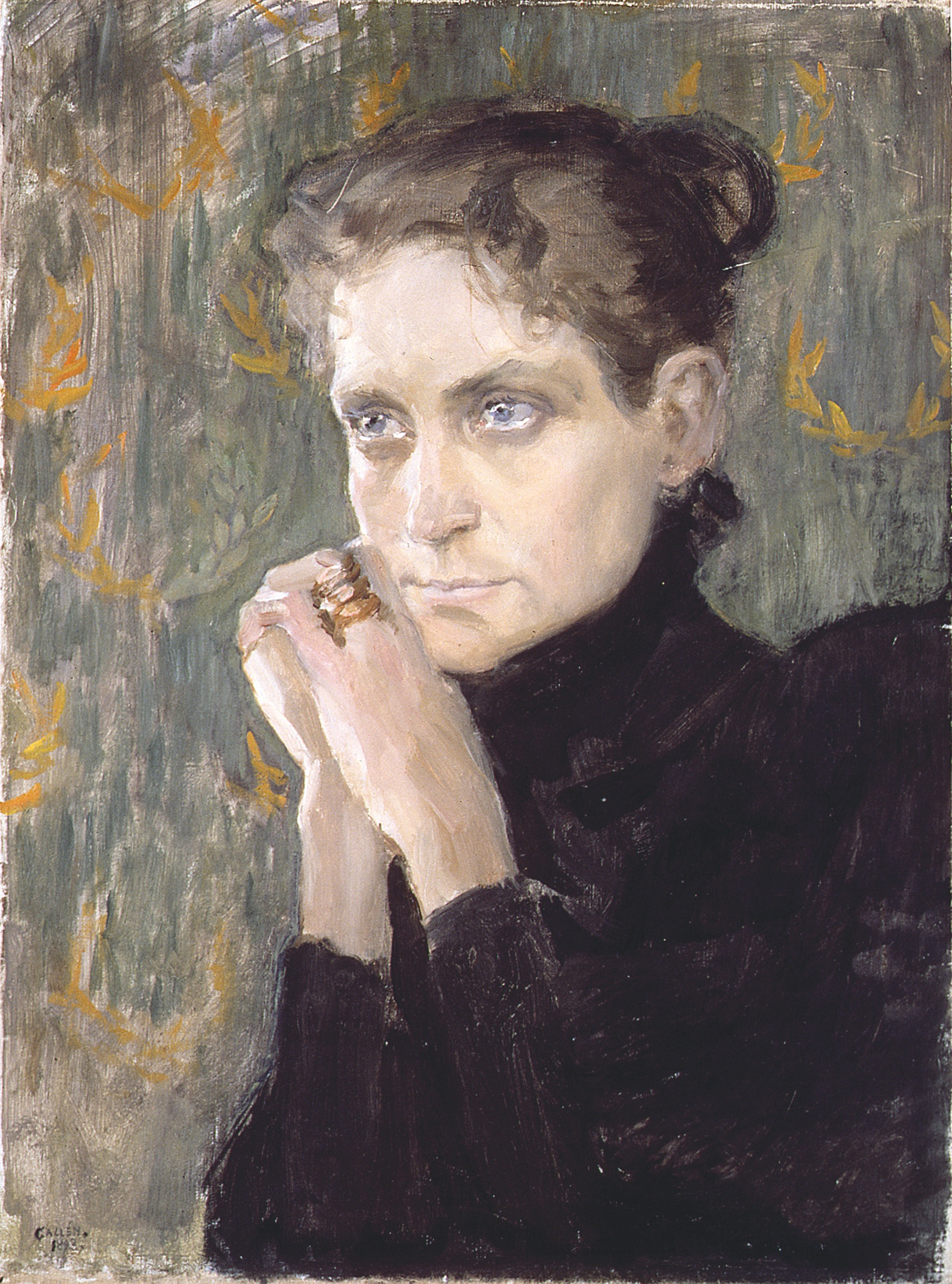
Portrait by Akseli Gallen-Kallela in 1893

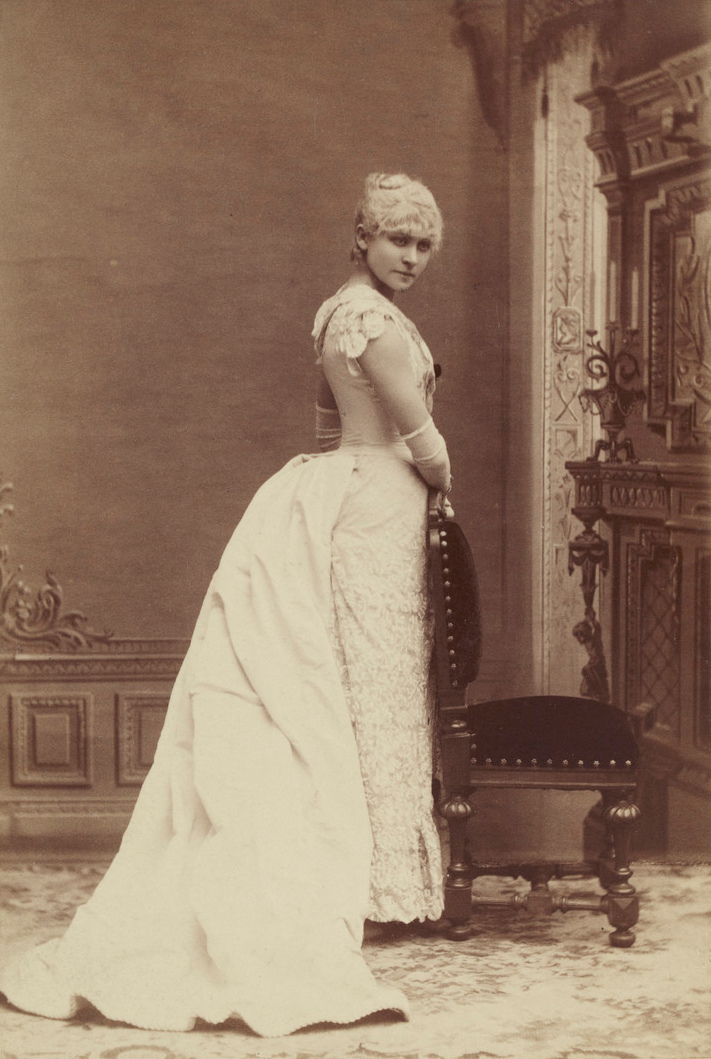
Aalberg in the play of Adrienne Lecouvreur in Copenhagen, 1890s

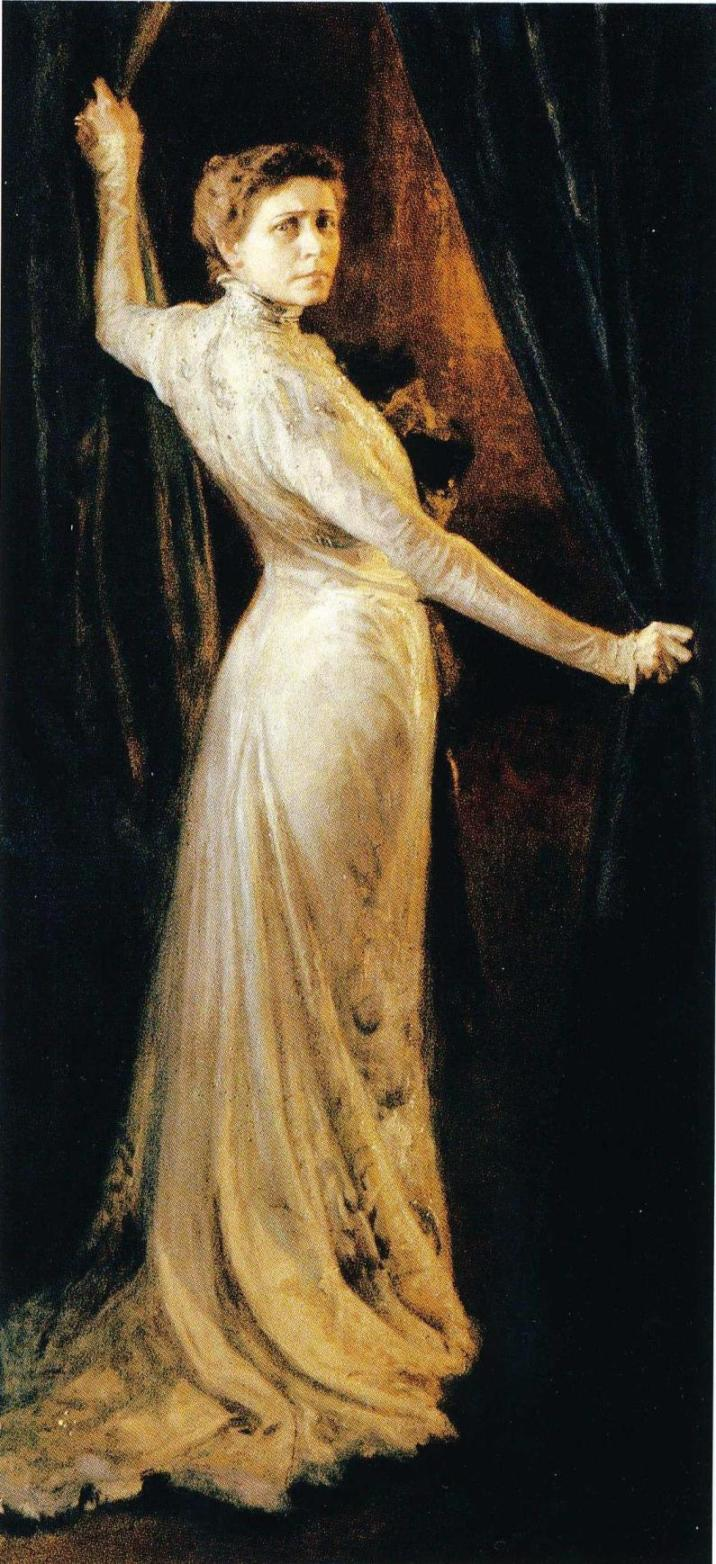
Portrait by Albert Edelfelt, 1902

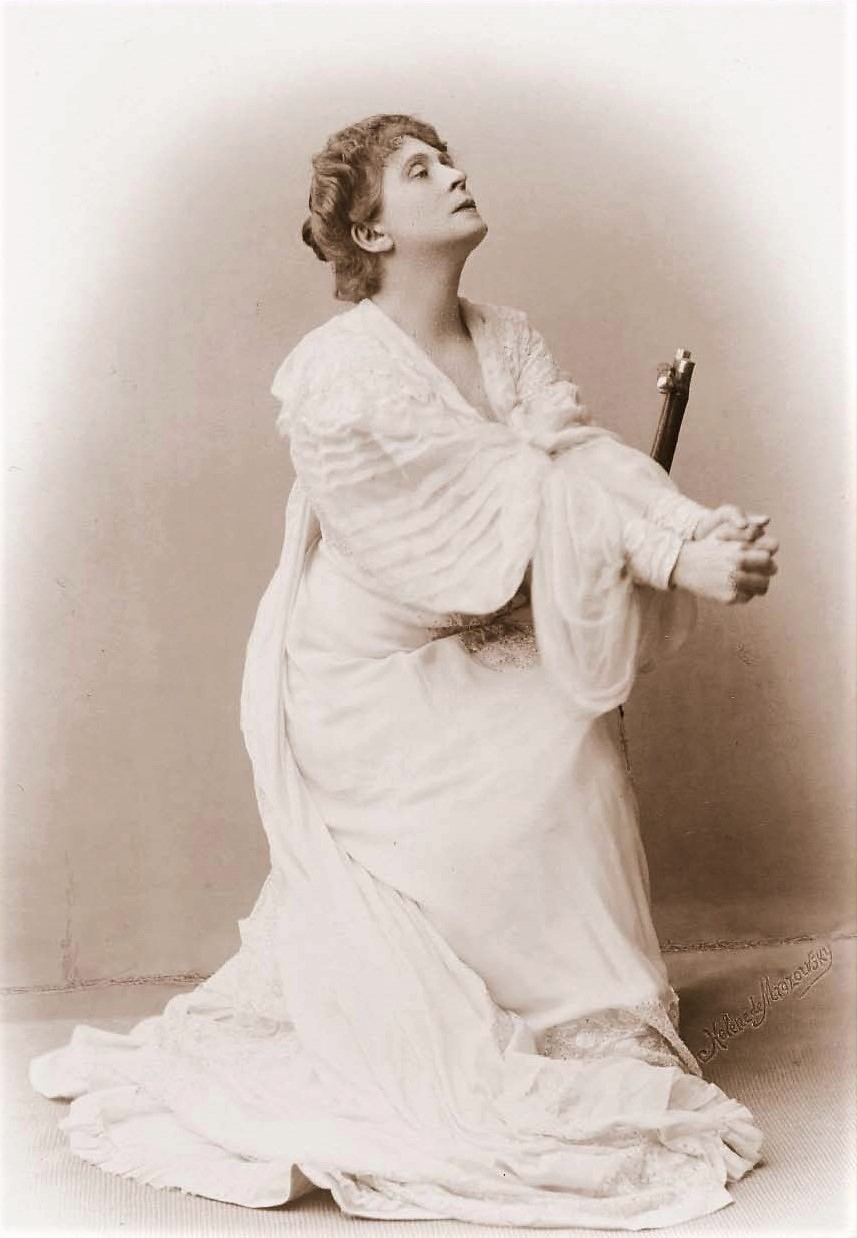
As Magda in Hermann Sudermann's Heimat in St. Petersburg, 1904–05

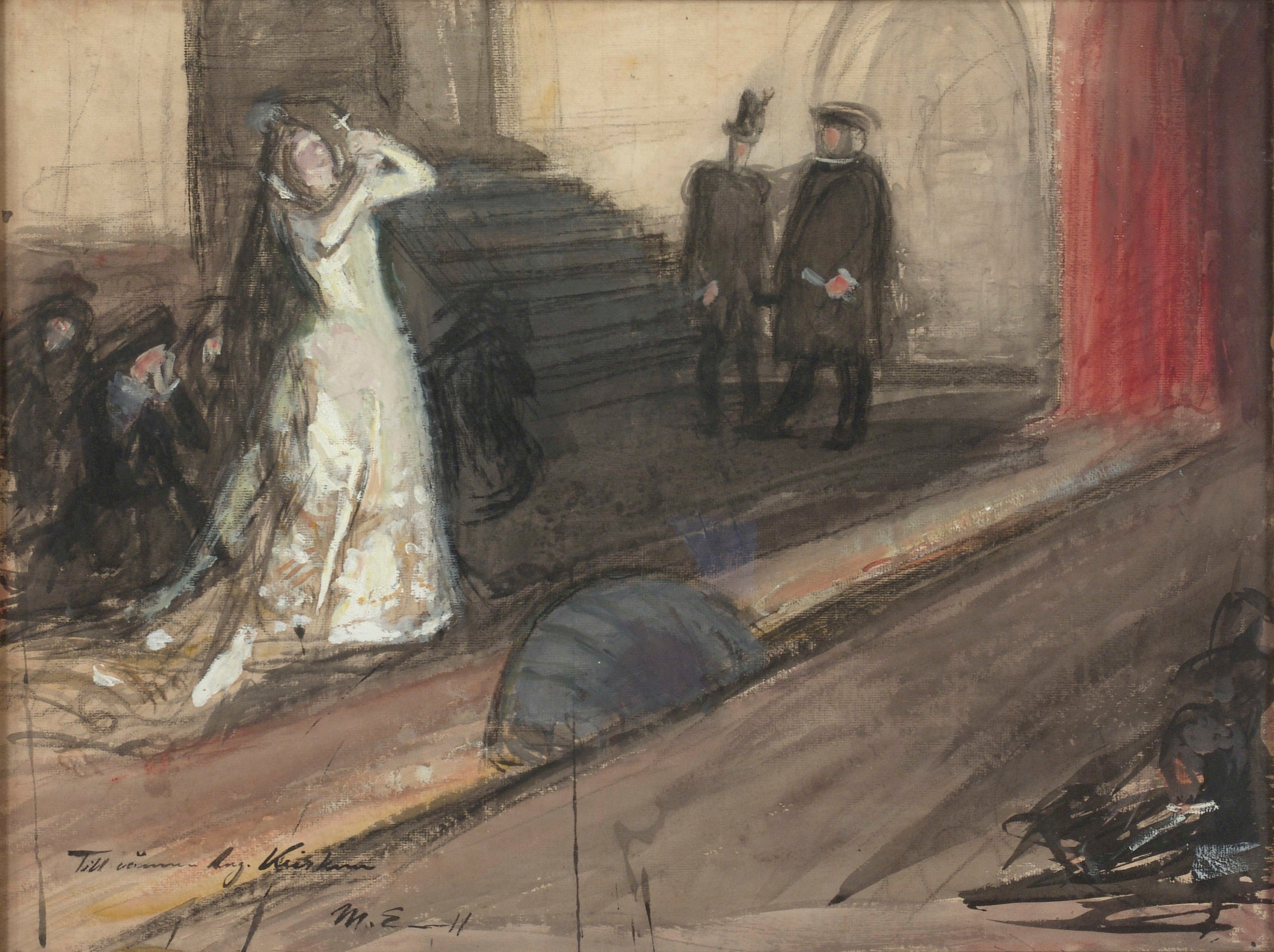
Sketch of Aalbert as Maria Stuart, by Magnus Enckell in 1905

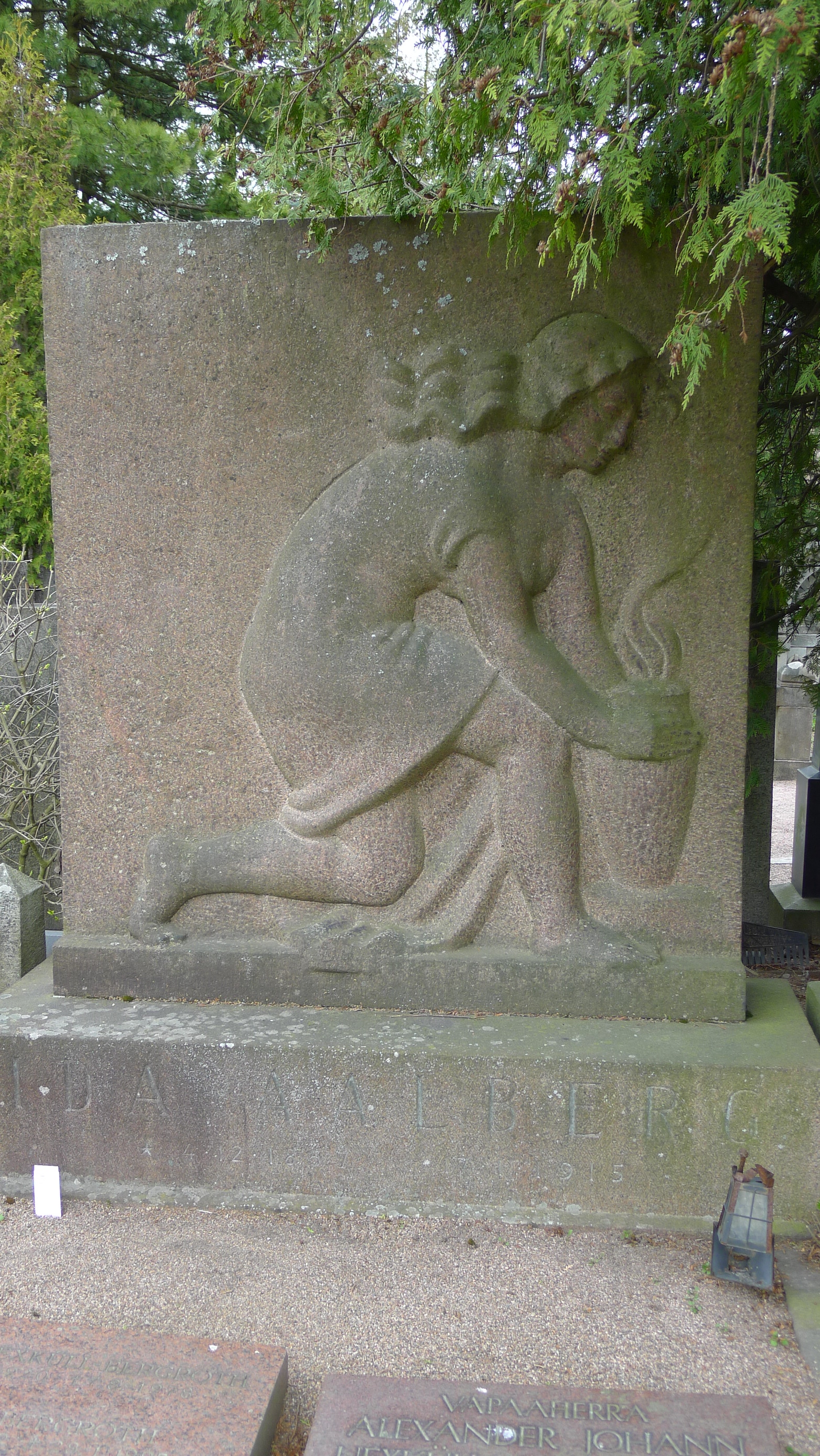
Aalberg's grave at Hietaniemi Cemetery

== See also ==
- Maria Silfvan
- Hedvig Raa-Winterhjelm
