= Tervakoski =

Village in Janakkala, Finland

Coordinates: 60.814°N 24.626°E

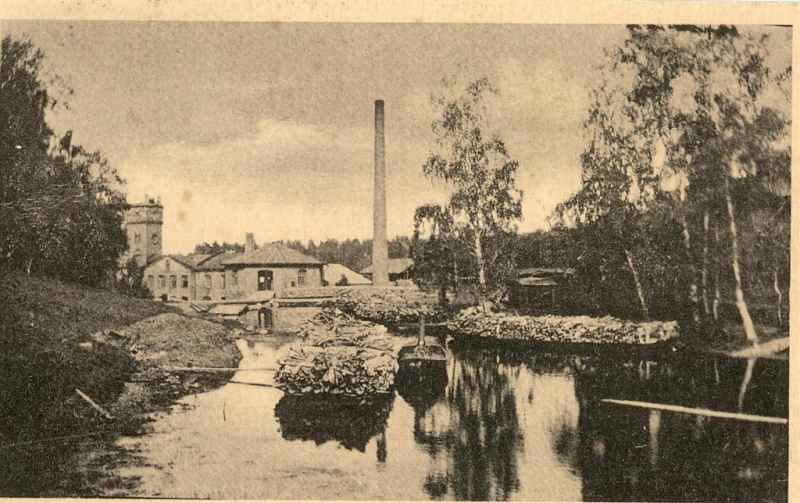
The Tervakoski Paper Mill in 1900

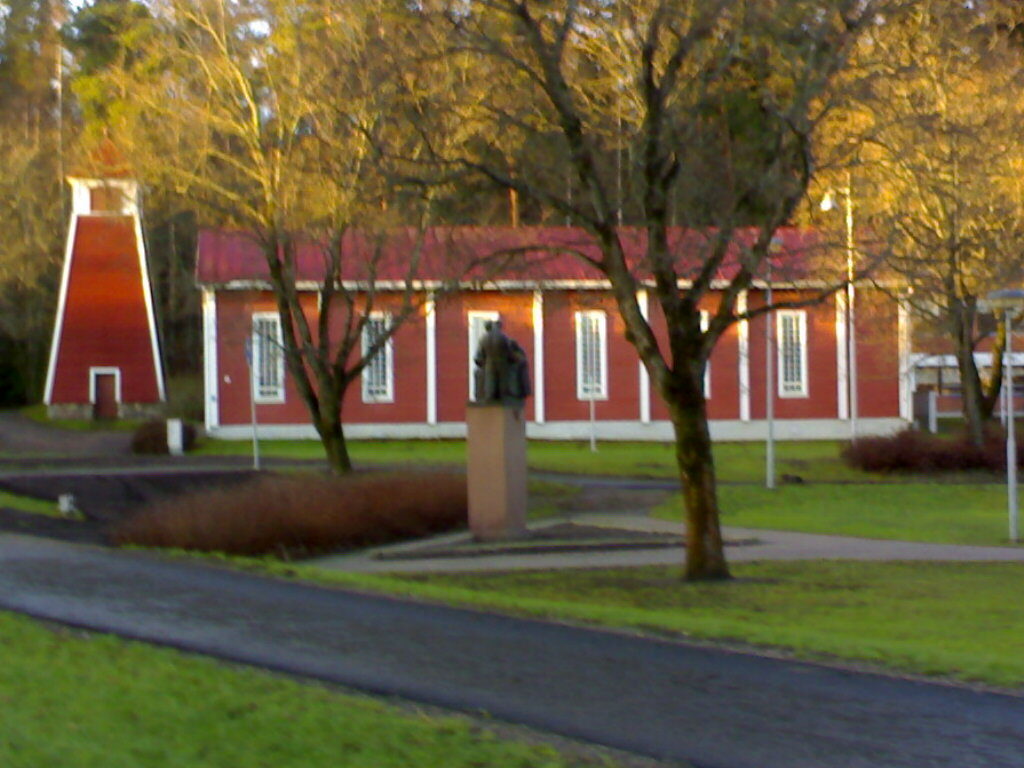
The Tervakoski Church

Tervakoski (Finnish pronunciation: [ˈterʋɑˌkoski]; lit. 'tar rapids') is a small town in Janakkala, Finland. In 2021, there were 3,972 inhabitants.

A well-known and popular amusement park Puuhamaa is located in the village. About 1.7 kilometres (1.1 mi) southeast of Puuhamaa, on the other shore of Lake Alasjärvi, is Tervaniemi, which offers accommodation.

Tervakoski Oy's paper mill, established in 1818, is located in Tervakoski.

== See also ==
- Leppäkoski – another village in Janakkala
