= Janakkala =

- Municipality
- Janakkalan kunta Janakkala kommun
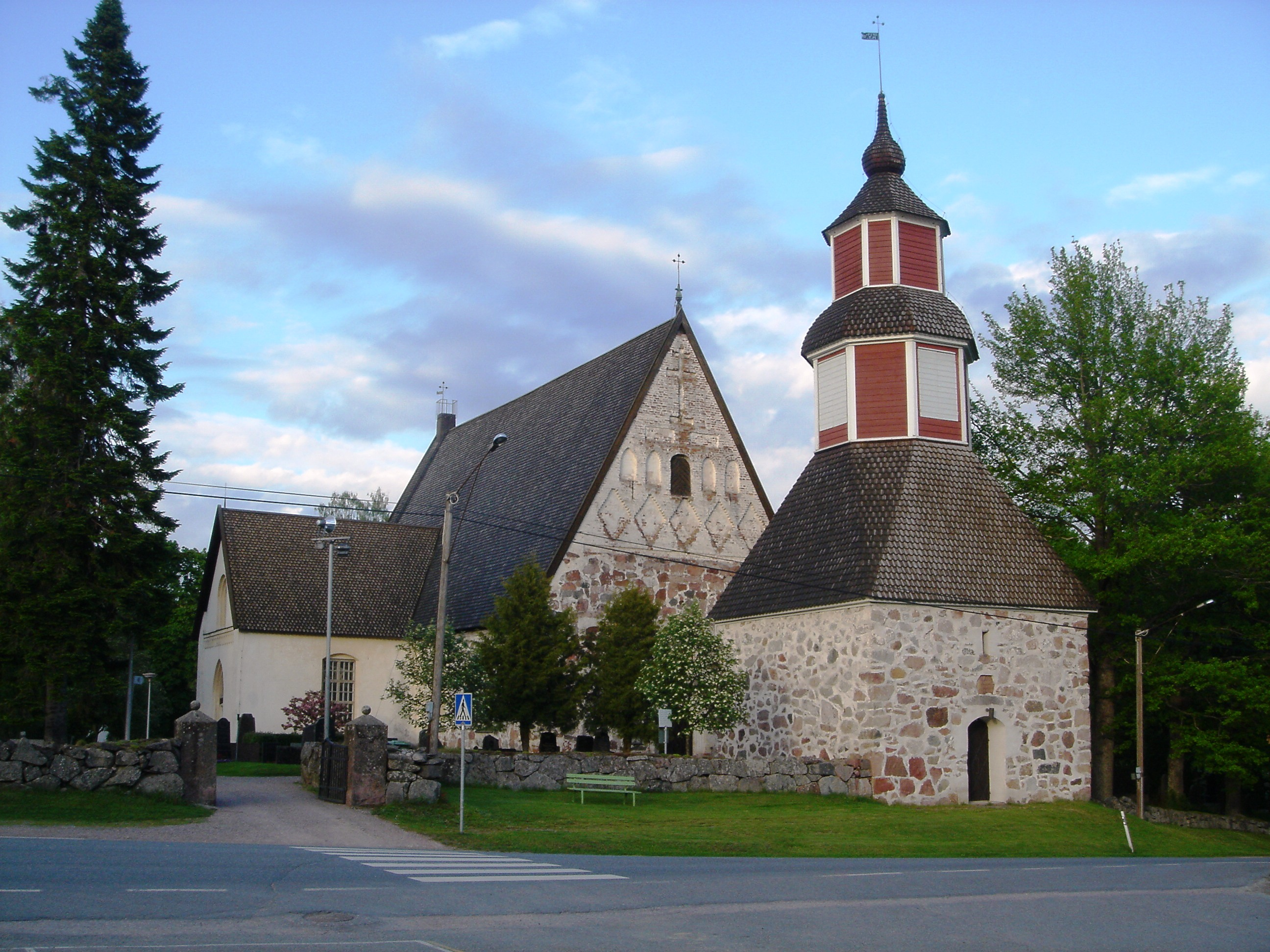
- Church of Saint Lawrence in Janakkala

- Coat of arms

- Location of Janakkala in Finland
- Interactive map of Janakkala
- Coordinates: 60°55′N 024°39′E
- Country: Finland
- Region: Kanta-Häme
- Sub-region: Hämeenlinna
- Charter: 1866
- Seat: Turenki
- Villages: Leppäkoski, Tervakoski

Government
  - Municipality manager: Reijo Siltala (– 2024)

Area (2018-01-01)
  - Total: 586.07 km^{2} (226.28 sq mi)
  - Land: 547.41 km^{2} (211.36 sq mi)
  - Water: 38.63 km^{2} (14.92 sq mi)
  - Rank: 156th largest in Finland

Population (2025-12-31)
  - Total: 15,867
  - Rank: 69th largest in Finland
  - Density: 28.99/km^{2} (75.1/sq mi)

Population by native language
  - Finnish: 95.4% (official)
  - Swedish: 0.4%
  - Others: 4.2%

Population by age
  - 0 to 14: 16.2%
  - 15 to 64: 59%
  - 65 or older: 24.8%
- Time zone: UTC+02:00 (EET)
  - Summer (DST): UTC+03:00 (EEST)
- Website: www.janakkala.fi/en/

Janakkala (Finnish pronunciation: [ˈjɑnɑkːɑlɑ]) is a municipality of Finland. Its administrative centre is in Turenki. Janakkala is located along Highway 3 (E12) in the province of Southern Finland and is part of the Kanta-Häme region. To the south, Janakkala shares a boundary with Riihimäki, the northern neighbour being Hämeenlinna. It is 16 kilometres (9.9 mi) from Turenki to Hämeenlinna, 94 kilometres (58 mi) to Tampere, and 96 kilometres (60 mi) to Helsinki.

The municipality has a population of 15,867 (31 December 2025) and covers an area of 586.07 square kilometres (226.28 sq mi) of which 38.63 km^{2} (14.92 sq mi) is water. The population density is 28.99 inhabitants per square kilometre (75.1/sq mi). In Janakkala the rate of unemployment is 9.7% and the rate of municipal taxes is %. The municipality is unilingually Finnish.

== Economy ==
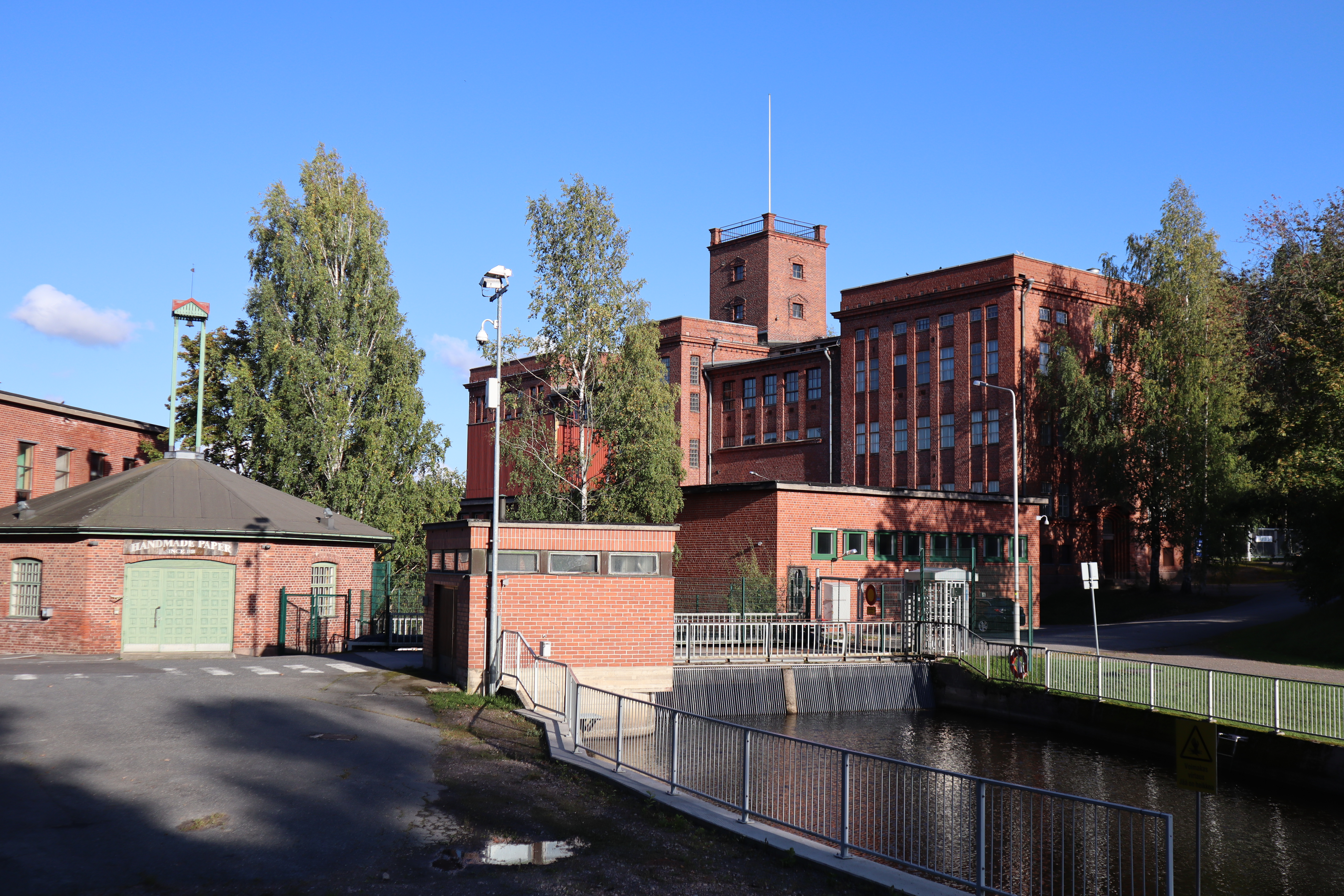
Tervakoski paper mill

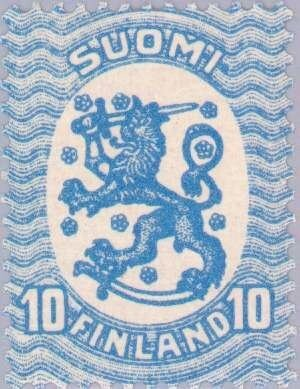
Stamp of Finland produced in Tervakoski, Janakkala in 1924.

Another significant industrial area in the municipality is Turenki, where the railway had a decisive influence on the birth of industry and settlement. In the late 1940s, a sugar factory was established in Turenki, which triggered rapid development in the region. The sugar factory also enabled extensive sugar beet cultivation in Janakkala, and millions of kilos of sugar were produced annually during production seasons. Later, in the 1960s, an ice cream factory was built in Turenki, which continues ice cream production today (currently Froneri Finland). Although sugar production ended in 1998, the former factory buildings are still used for industrial and business purposes.

Janakkala still has a diverse industrial structure: it is home to companies in the food industry (Valio and Froneri), metal industry (such as Kolmeks Oy's pump and motor manufacturing), and even musical instrument makers. Expanding business parks, such as MORE (one of the largest in Southern Finland), continue to offer facilities for industry and logistics.

== Heraldry ==
Coat of arms of Janakkala.

The coat of arms of Janakkala, a head of Eurasian lynx (Lynx lynx), the regional animal of Kanta-Häme, describes Janakkala's location in the heart of Tavastia. An aisle line of partition is a reference to Hakoinen Castle into the mountain, and the upper two arrows encircling the cross, symbol of Christianity, the image of the Crusades battles.

== Manor culture ==
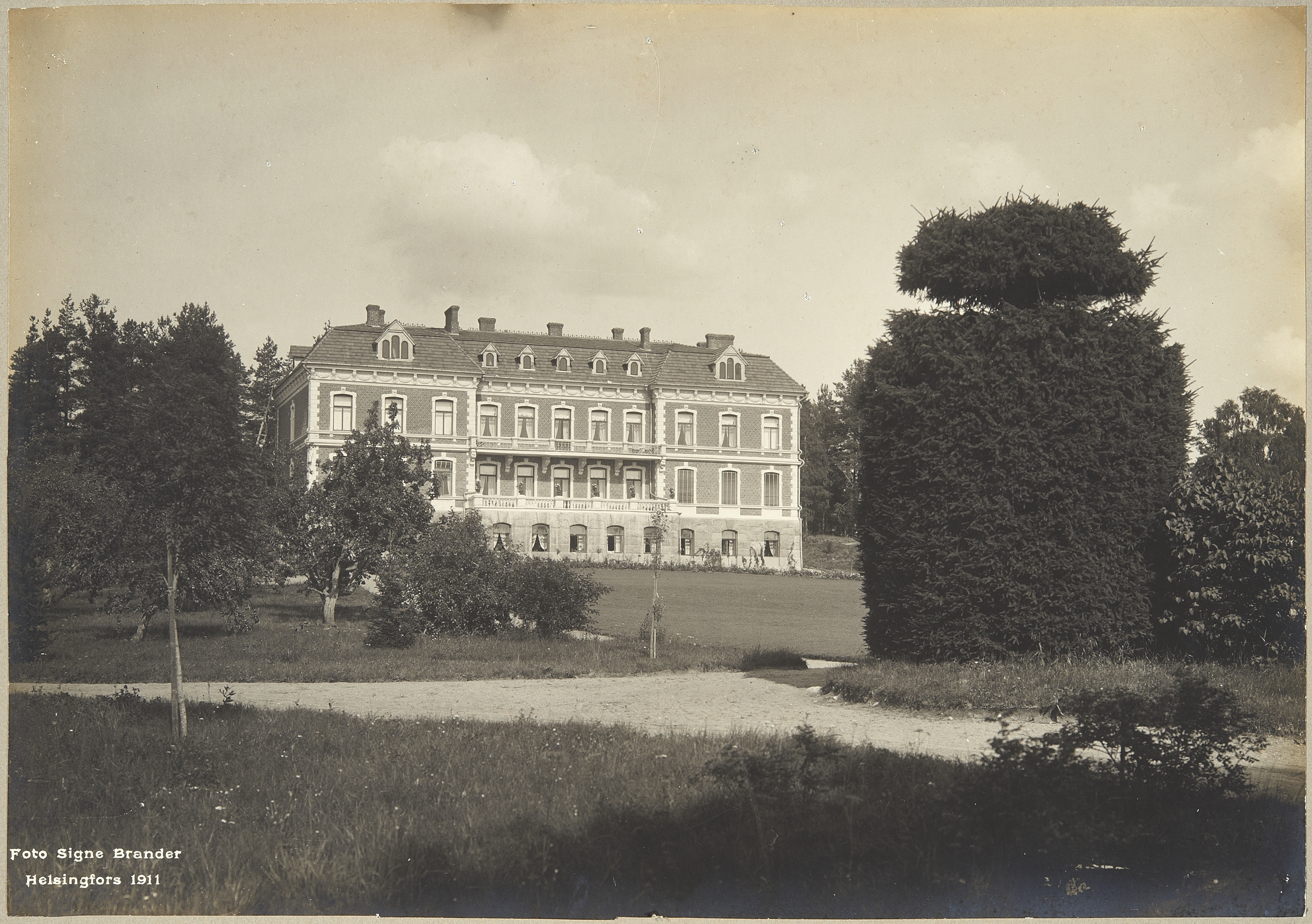
Vanantaa Manor.

Janakkala has many historic manor houses. Among these are Hakoisten Manor, Harviala Manor, Hiisi Manor, Hyvikkälä Manor, Irjala Manor, Kernaala Manor, Konttila Manor, Kuumola Manor, Leppäkoski Manor, Löyttymäki Manor, Monikkala Manor, Rehaka Manor, Sauvala Manor, Tervakoski Manor, Toiva Manor, Vanantaa Manor, and Virala Manor.

Janakkala is also known for pheasant hunting, an activity closely connected with its manor landscape. Sauvala Manor, in particular, is known for historical pheasant breeding.

== Notable sites ==
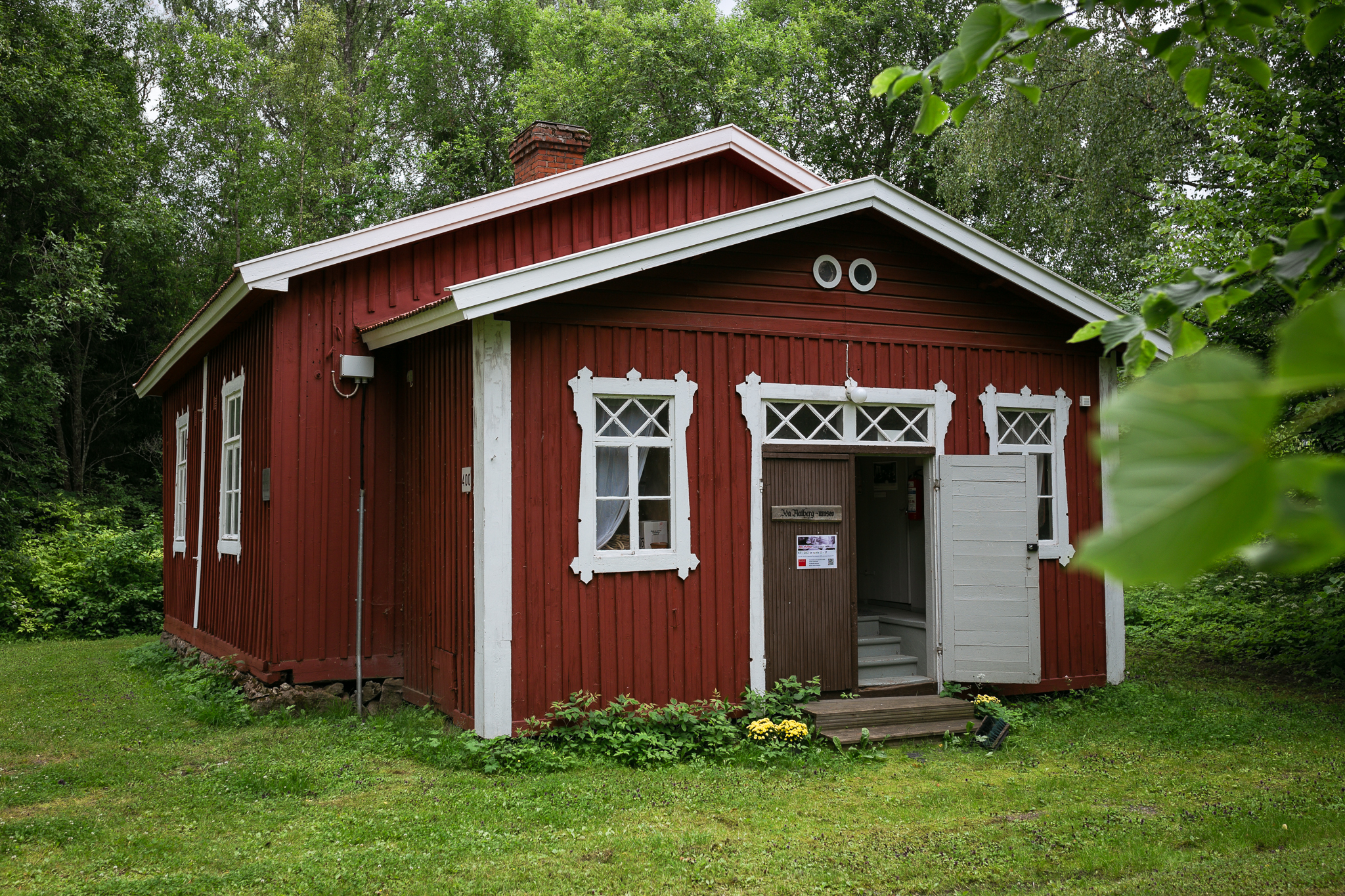
Ida Aalberg Museum.

One site in Janakkala is the Church of Saint Lawrence, which is the last medieval stone church in the Häme region, built in the early 1500s. The eastern end of the church still displays the coats of arms of the Tott noble family.

The Laurinmäki nature and cultural area contains a tenant farmer museum, nature trails, and a summer café, and hosts events throughout the year, such as the traditional Christmas opening.

Puuhamaa is a water park in Janakkala offering water slides, boating, motor tracks, and go-karting. It is a popular tourist destination enjoyed by people of all ages. Kalpalinna is an all-season skiing and biking center located in Turenki.

Additionally, Janakkala has the Ida Aalberg Museum dedicated to the famous Finnish actress, as well as several nature trails like the Kiipula mountain biking route and Vanajavesi kayaking routes.

== Notable people ==
- Actress Ida Aalberg was born in 1857 in Leppäkoski village in Janakkala.
- Business magnate, Chairman of Nokia, Casimir Ehrnrooth owned Vanantaka Manor. He is buried at Saint Lawrence Church in Janakkala.
- Colonel, business magnate Hugo Robert Standertskjöld (1844–1931) was born at Vanantaka Manor in Janakkala. He was the owner of Aulanko in Hämeenlinna.

== See also ==
- Hattula
- Hämeenlinna
- Häme Castle
- Loppi
