= Holy Cross Church, Hattula =

Hattula Holy Cross Church
- Hattulan Pyhän Ristin kirkko
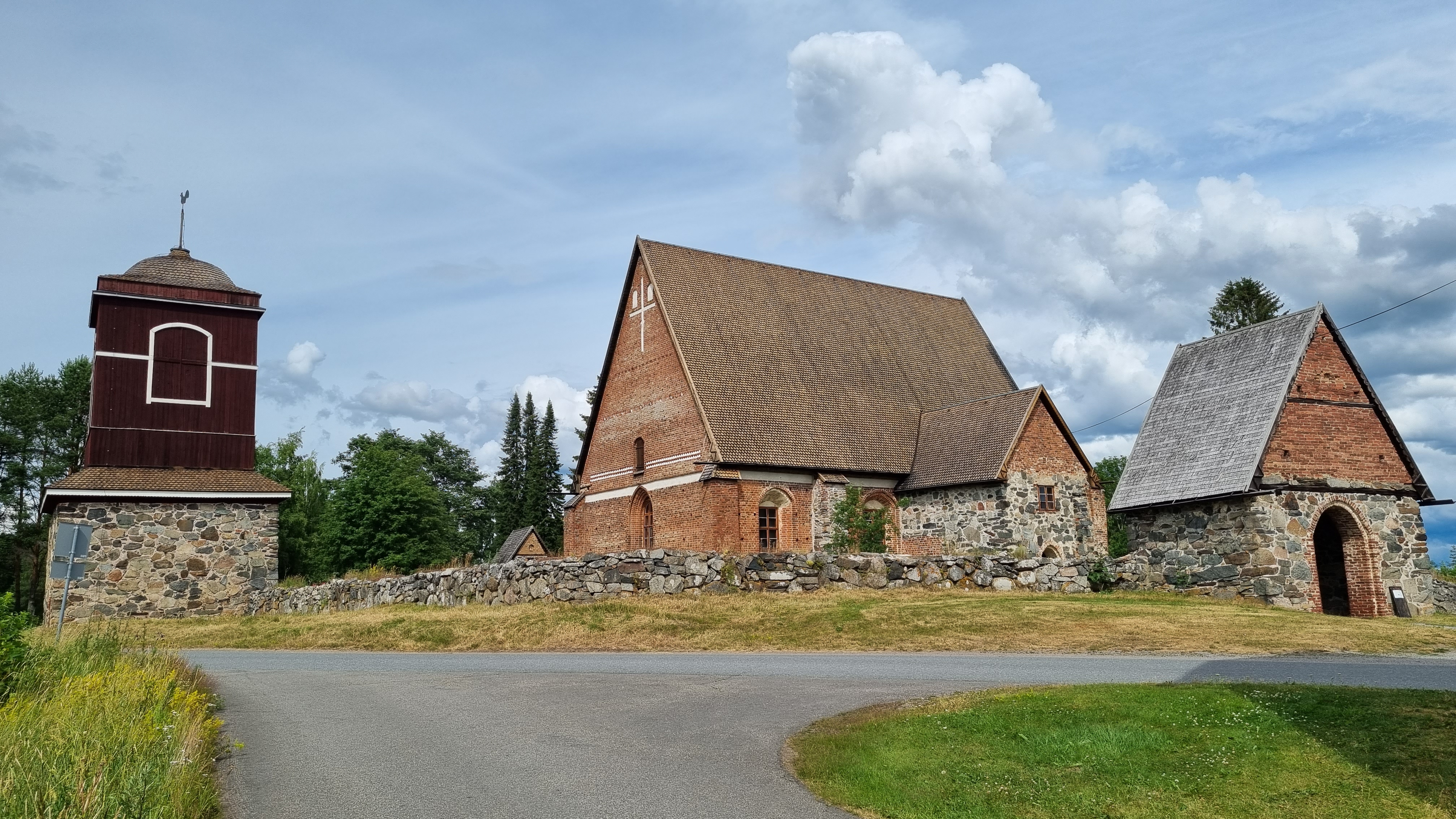
- Hattula Holy Cross Church
- 61°03′03″N 024°23′52″E
- Location: Hattula, Kanta-Häme
- Country: Finland
- Denomination: Lutheran
- Website: www.hattula-evl.fi

History
- Status: Parish church
- Dedication: True Cross

Architecture
- Functional status: Active
- Heritage designation: Finnish Cultural Heritage Site of National Significance
- Style: Gothic
- Years built: 1472–1490

Specifications
- Materials: Brick

Administration
- Diocese: Diocese of Tampere

The Holy Cross Church (Finnish: Pyhän Ristin kirkko) in Hurttala, Hattula, Finland, is the oldest church in the former Tavastia (Häme) province. In the Middle Ages, the Church of the Holy Cross, known as a pilgrimage site, became famous for its frescoes.

== History ==
The Hattula church is known for its lime paint frescoes done in late Gothic style, likely completed by the same group of artists who later painted the St. Lars church in Lohja (Finnish: Pyhän Laurin kirkko).

Unique for having been built almost entirely of brick rather than stone, the church was a popular pilgrimage destination during the Middle Ages. A grey stone perimeter wall was added in the 16th century. The church contains paintings from the years 1510 through 1922, as well as 40 wooden sculptures dating to the first half of the 14th century. Precious-metal crowns which had formerly belonged to the church were confiscated during the Reformation. The church pulpit, dating to 1550, is the oldest surviving pulpit in Finland. A second pulpit was built in the 17th century. A bell tower next to the church dates to 1813.

== Gallery ==
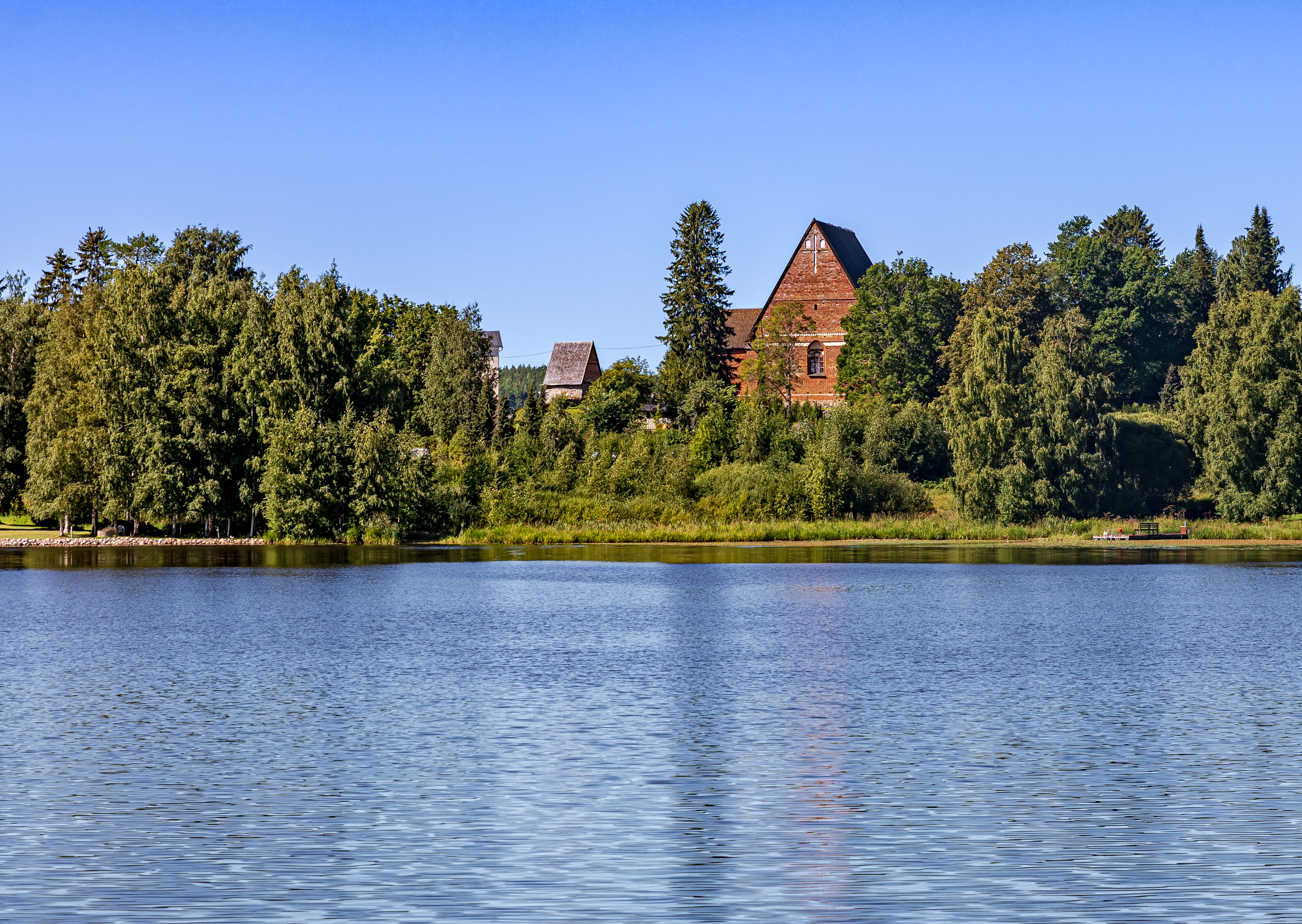
Church pictured from Lake Vanajavesi.

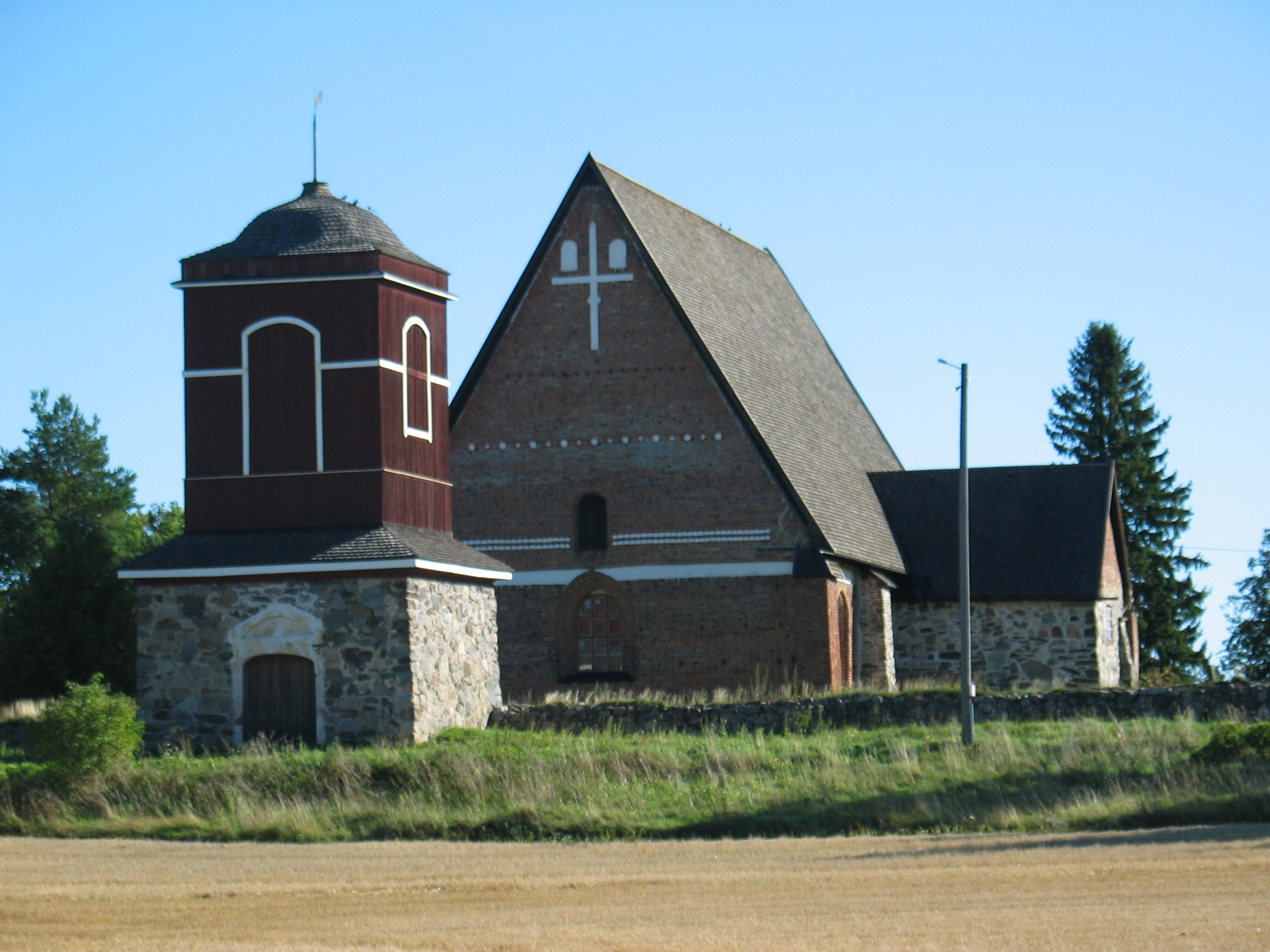
Church pictured from the north side.

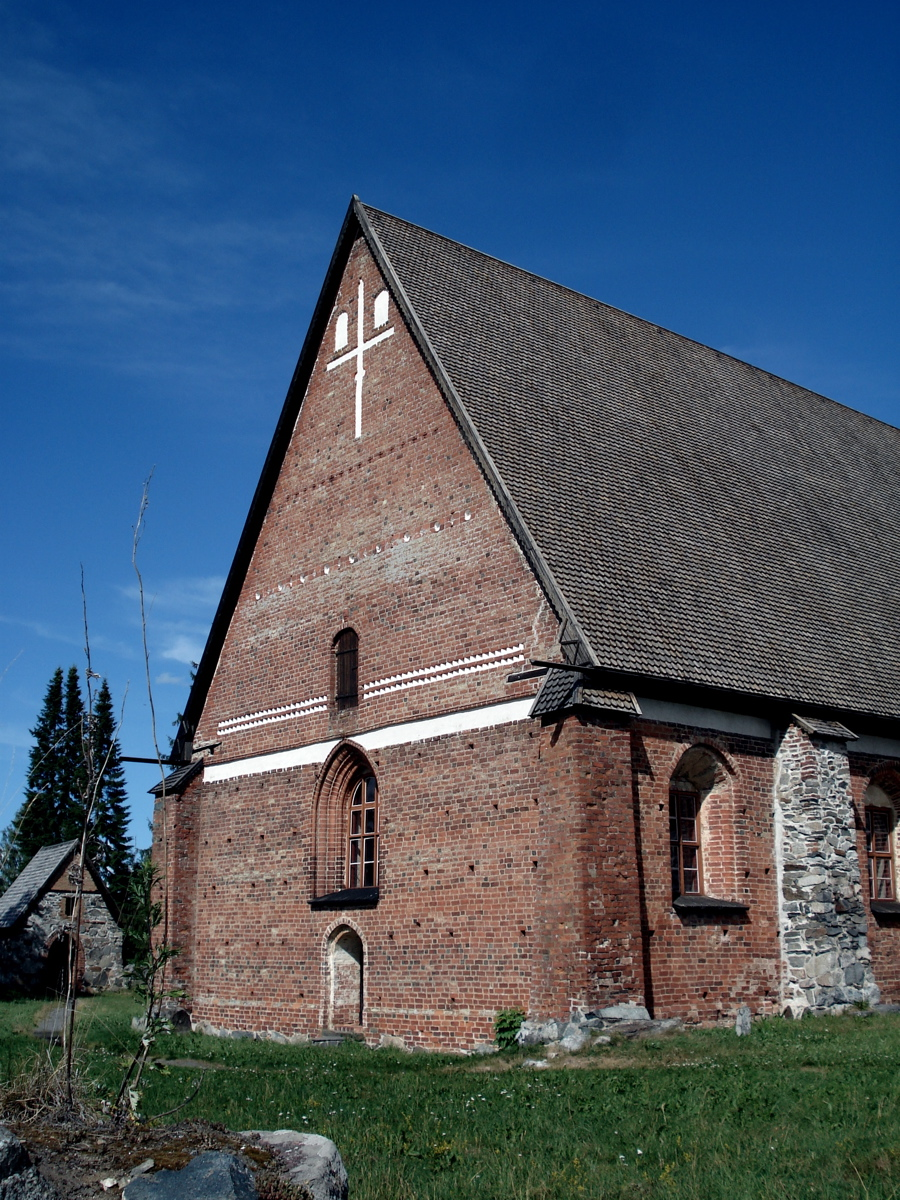
The north side of the church.

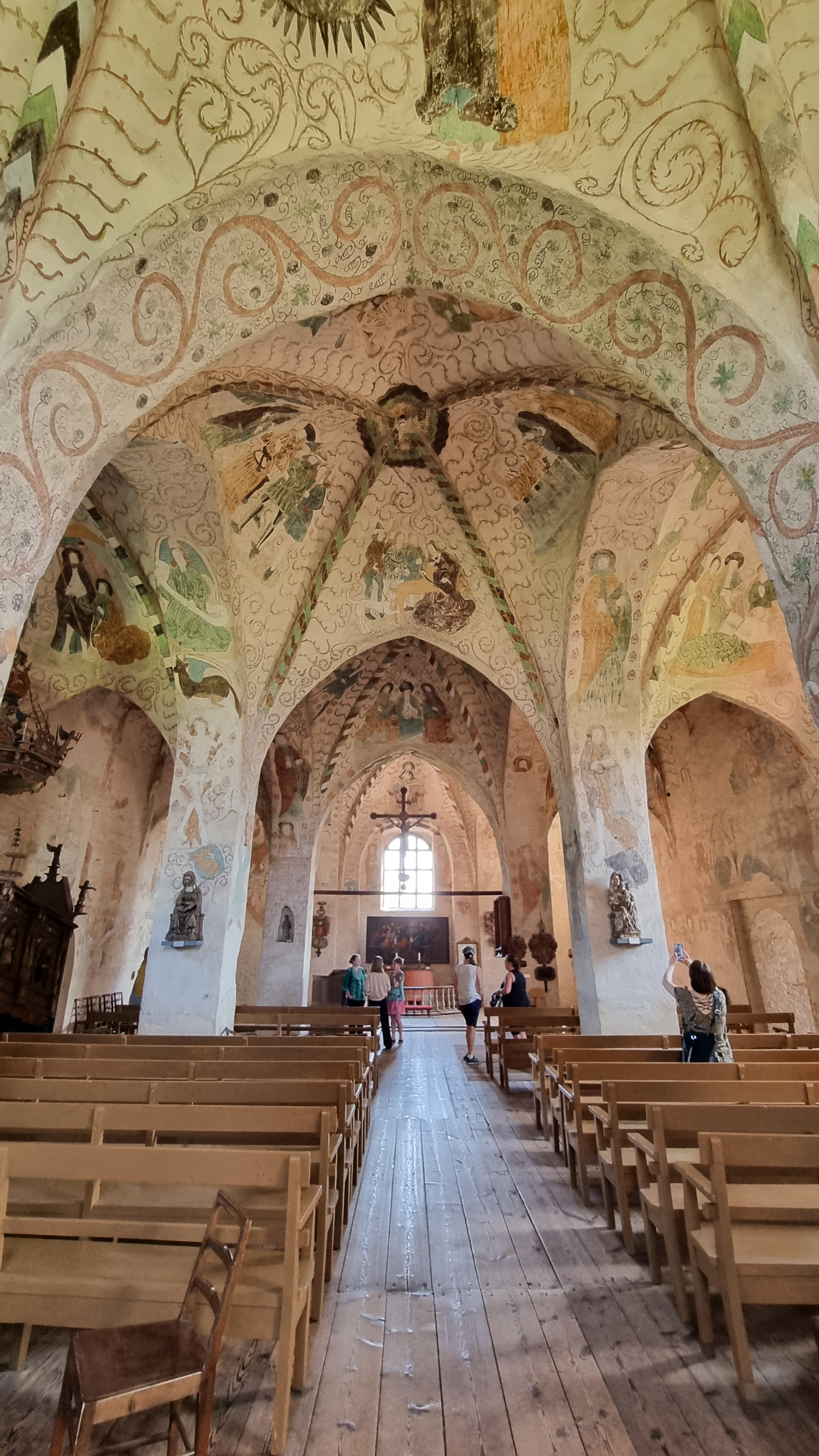
Interior.

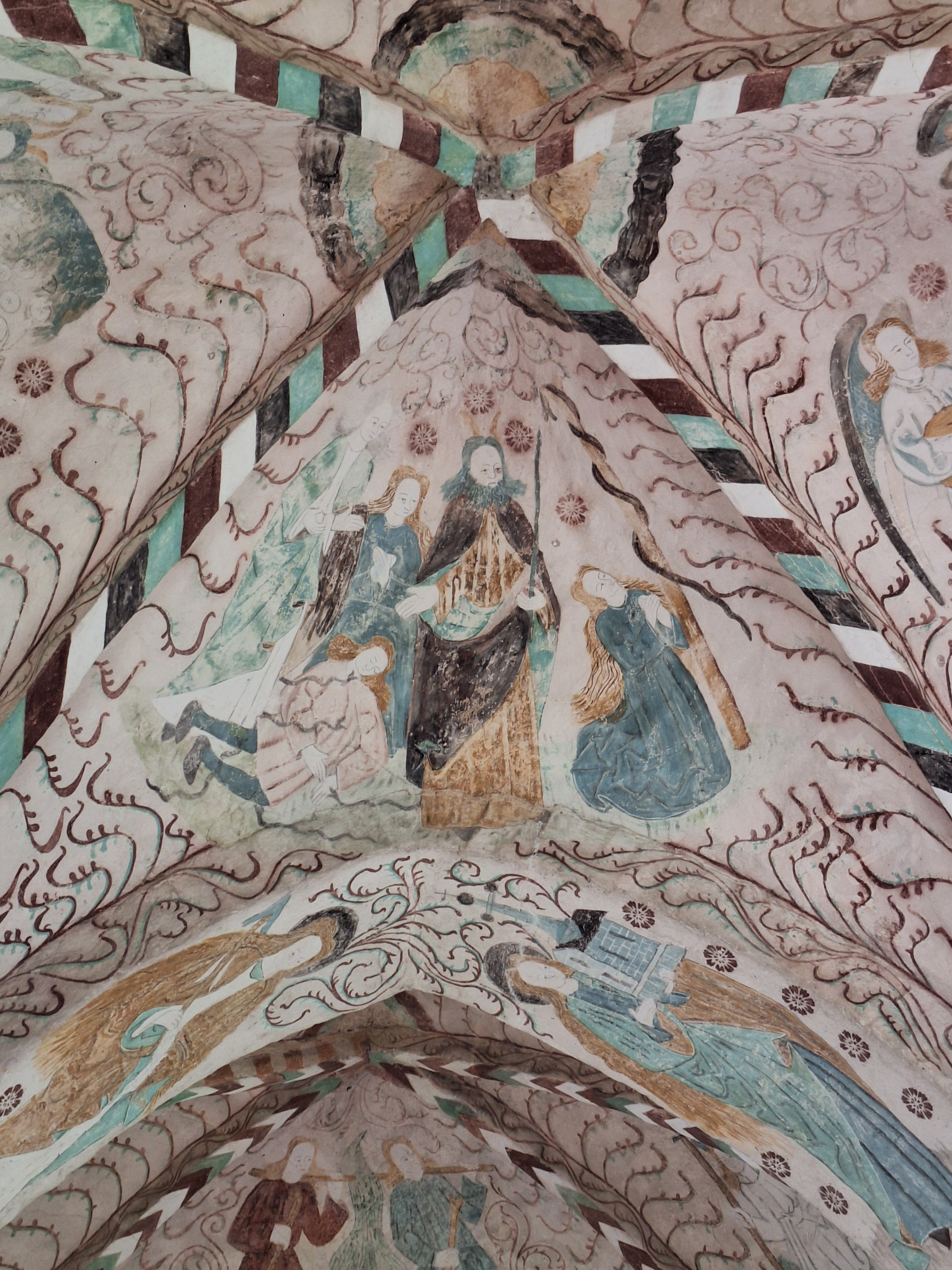
Frescoes.

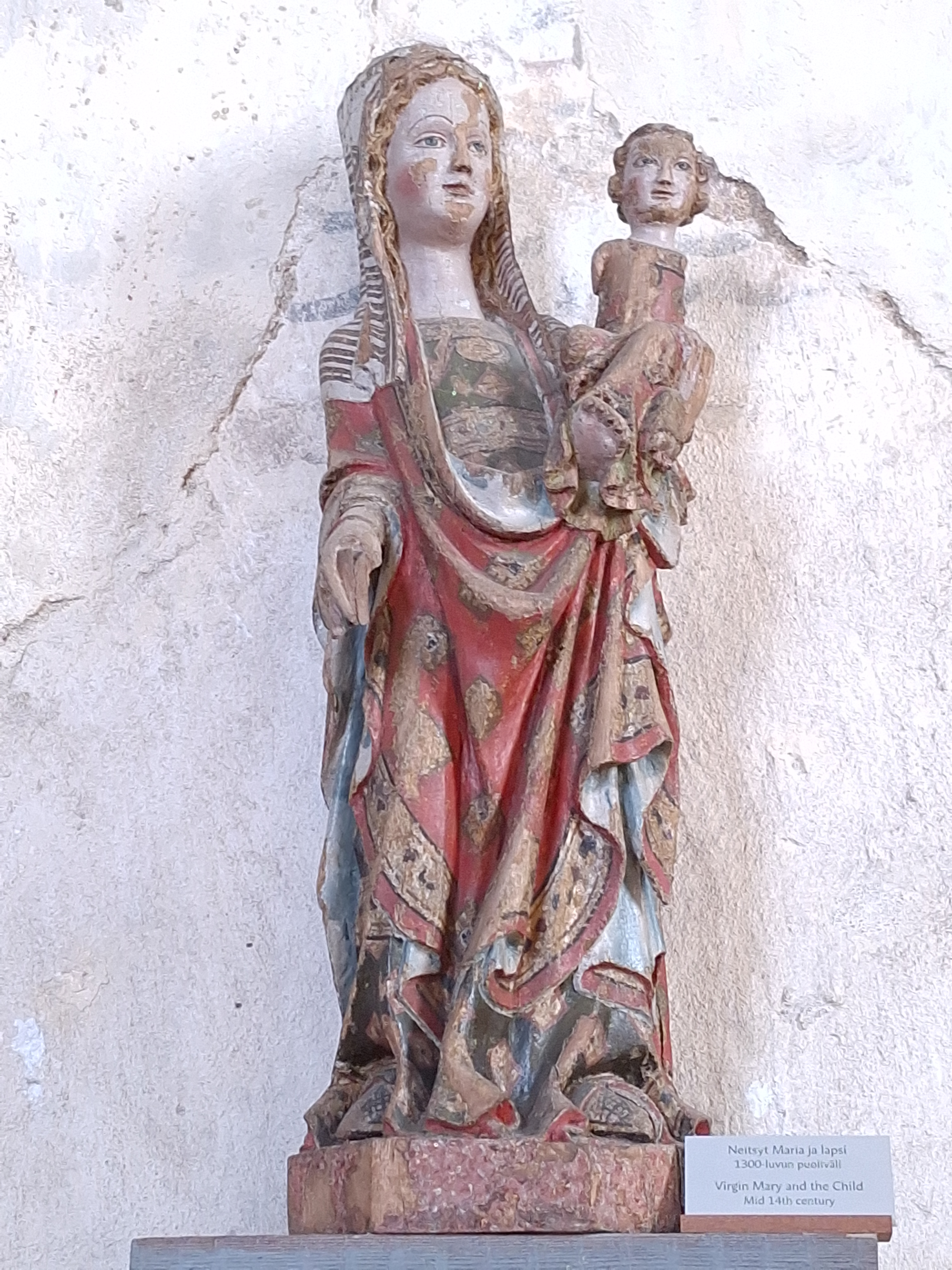
Saint Mary.

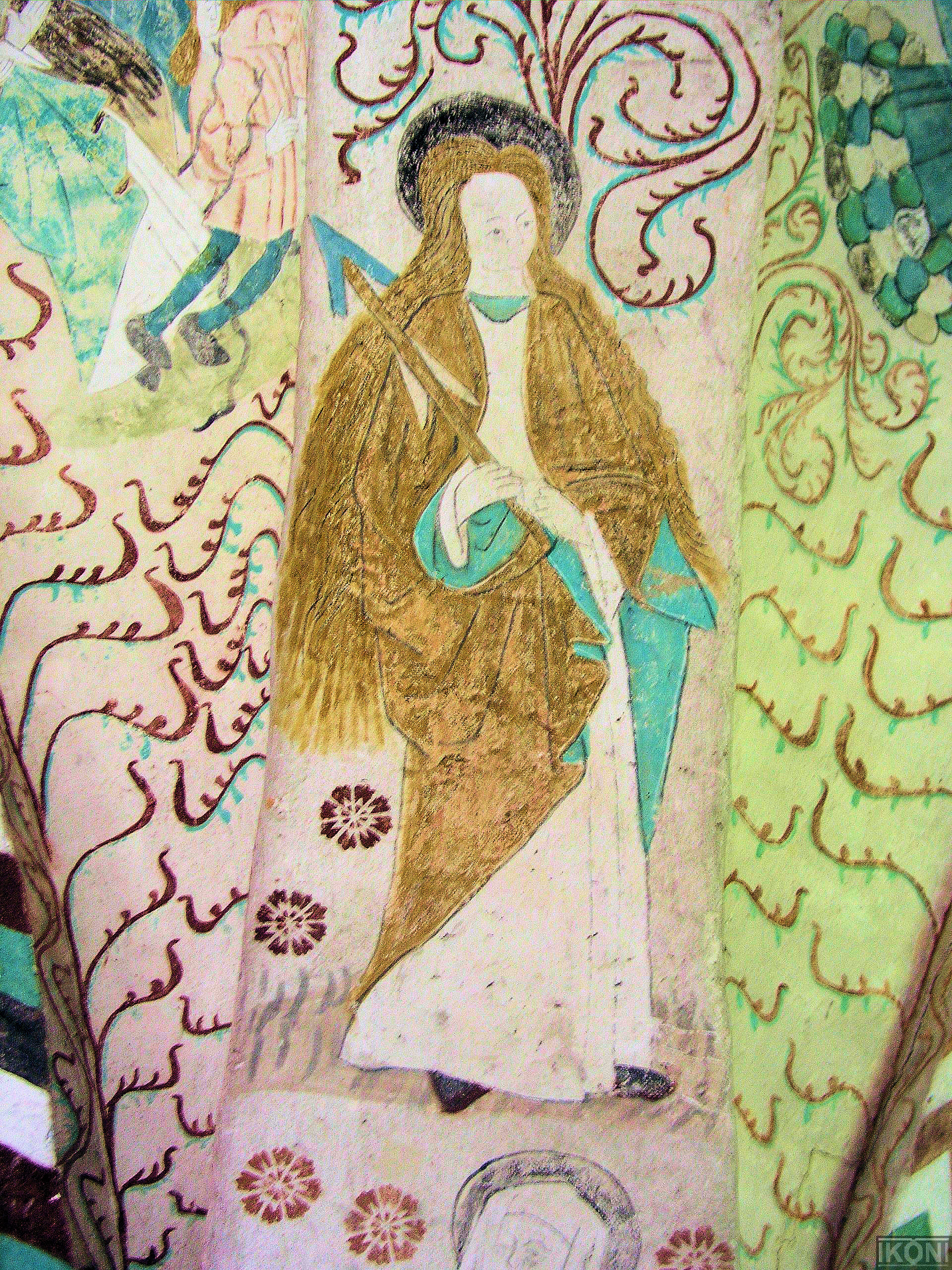
St. Ursula

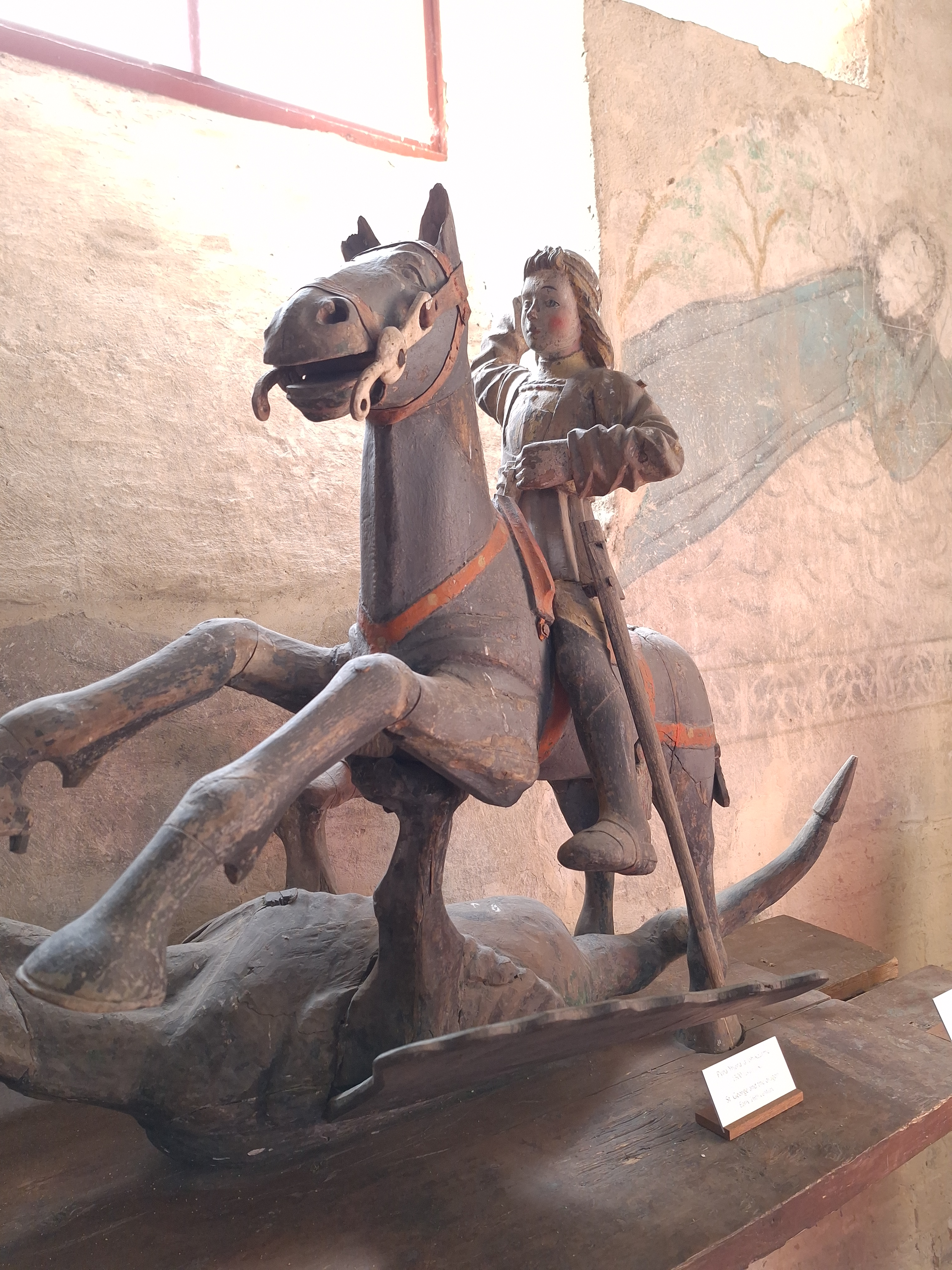
Saint George and the dragon.

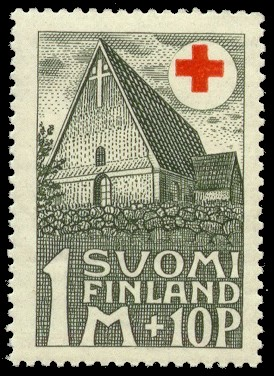
1931 postage stamp depicting the church

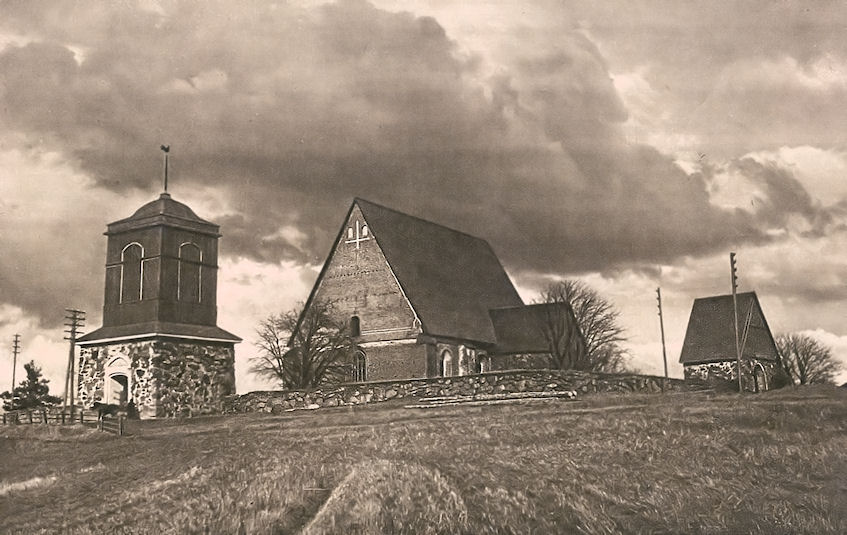
The old Hattula church
1926 photo by Kalle Artturi Havas

== See also ==
- Parola
- Hattula
- Lion of Parola
- Parola Tank Museum
- Häme Castle
- Hämeenlinna
