= Planman =

Planman may refer to:

- 2639 Planman, a main-belt asteroid
- Planman (surname), a Finnish surname
