= Planman (surname) =

Planman is a surname. Notable people with the surname include:

- Anders Planman, Finnish astronomer, professor of physics and mathematician
- Sveta Planman (born 1979), Finnish fashion designer and entrepreneur
- Tuomas Planman (born 1980), Finnish musician
