= Hattula =

- Municipality
- Hattulan kunta Hattula kommun
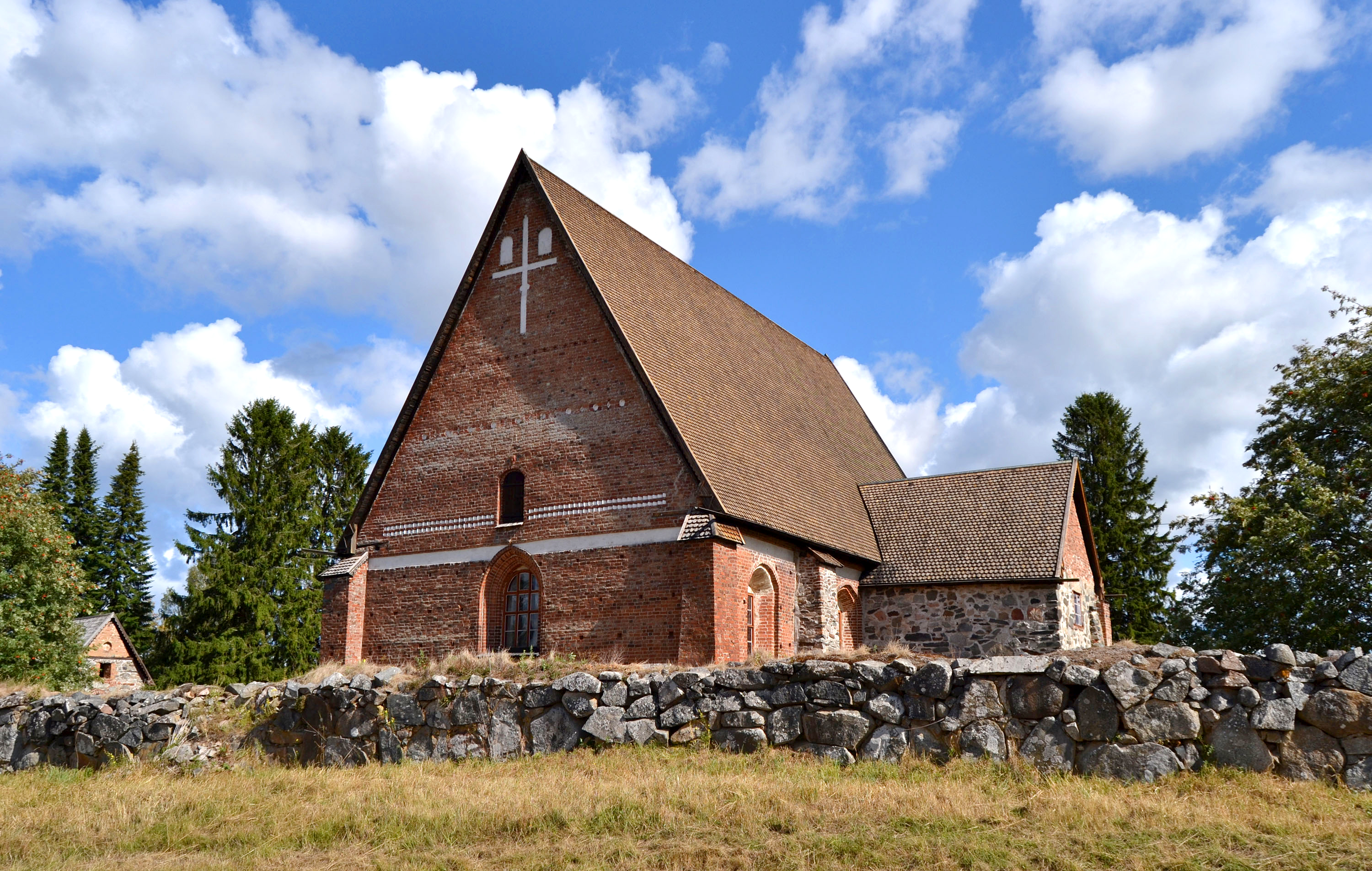
- The Holy Cross Church of Hattula

- Coat of arms

- Location of Hattula in Finland
- Interactive map of Hattula
- Coordinates: 61°03′N 024°22′E
- Country: Finland
- Region: Kanta-Häme
- Sub-region: Hämeenlinna
- First records: 1318
- Charter: 1868
- Seat: Parola

Government
  - Municipal manager: Pekka Järvi

Area (2018-01-01)
  - Total: 427.39 km^{2} (165.02 sq mi)
  - Land: 357.8 km^{2} (138.1 sq mi)
  - Water: 69.55 km^{2} (26.85 sq mi)
  - Rank: 214th largest in Finland

Population (2025-12-31)
  - Total: 9,346
  - Rank: 103rd largest in Finland
  - Density: 26.12/km^{2} (67.7/sq mi)

Population by native language
  - Finnish: 97% (official)
  - Swedish: 0.4%
  - Others: 2.6%

Population by age
  - 0 to 14: 17.4%
  - 15 to 64: 59.3%
  - 65 or older: 23.3%
- Time zone: UTC+02:00 (EET)
  - Summer (DST): UTC+03:00 (EEST)
- Website: hattula.fi

Hattula (Finnish: [ˈhɑtːulɑ]) is a municipality of Finland. It is part of the Kanta-Häme region and until 2010 it was located in the province of Southern Finland. Hattula is almost completely surrounded by Hämeenlinna, only in the north it shares the border with Valkeakoski and Pälkäne on the Pirkanmaa region side.

== History ==
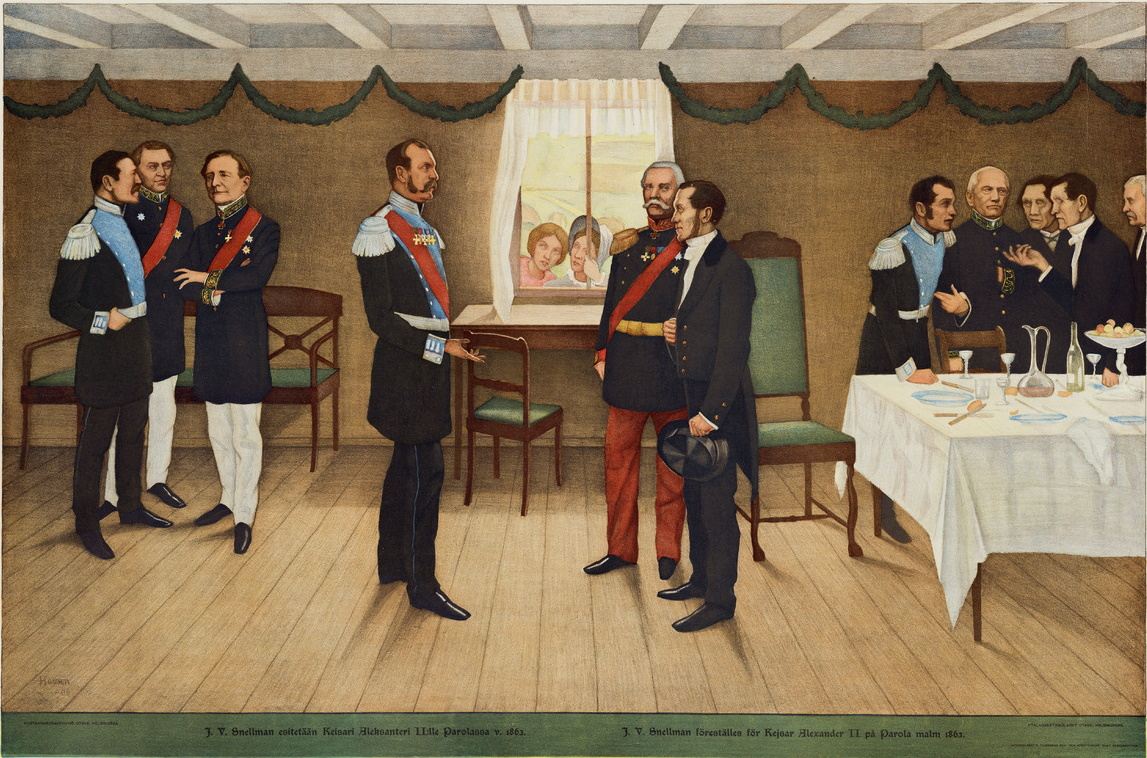
The Grand Duke of Finland, Alexander II, met Senator Johan Vilhelm Snellman at Parolannummi in 1863. The Finnish language was elevated to equal status alongside the Swedish language.

Hattula is also the birthplace of the Finnish cooperative movement, because Hannes Gebhard spoke the founding words of the cooperative movement on the shore of Lake Lehijärvi in 1899. Gebhard brought the British cooperative idea to Finland and served as the chairman of the Pellervo Coop Center from 1899 to 1918. A memorial dedicated to Gebhard was erected on the shore of Lake Lehijärvi in 1959.

== Population and size ==
Hattula encompasses an area of approximately 427 square kilometers. Hattula has a population of around 9,500 residents, with a population density of about 27.2 inhabitants per square kilometer.

== Language ==
The municipality is unilingually Finnish.

== Geography and nature ==
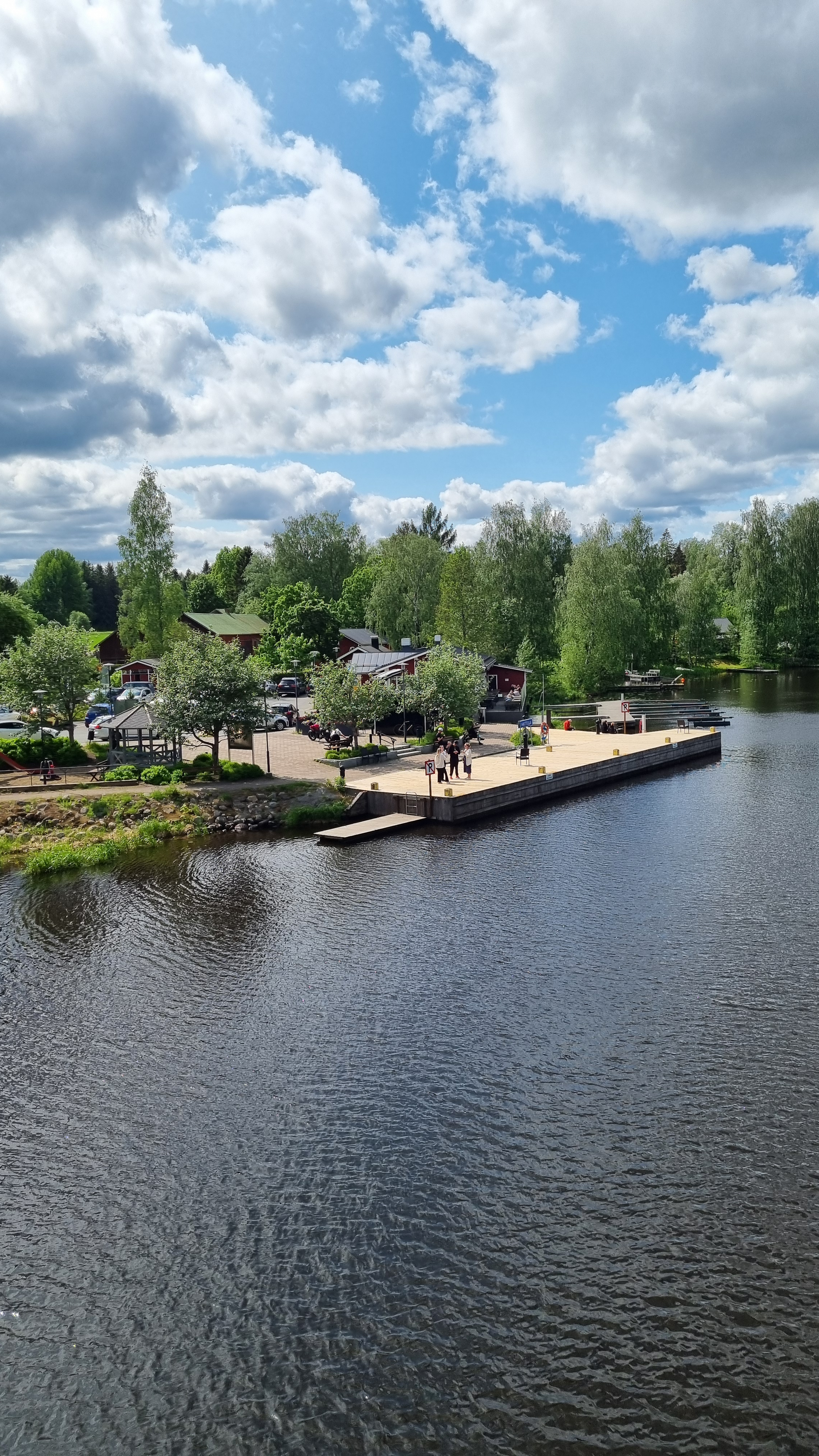
Mierola marina next to Lake Vanajavesi.

Hattula is located in the Vanajavesi Valley. The valley has a microclimate that extends the harvest and the natural growing season in autumn.

The nature in Hattula is verdant. The area features forests and lakeside cliffs, such as those found in the Vanajanniemi Recreation Area. The forests are a mix of pine and deciduous trees.

=== Climate ===
Hattula has a humid continental climate (Köppen: Dfb).

Climate data for Hattula Lepaa (1991–2020 normals, extremes 1959–present)
Month	Jan	Feb	Mar	Apr	May	Jun	Jul	Aug	Sep	Oct	Nov	Dec	Year
Record high °C (°F)	8.1 (46.6)	9.4 (48.9)	15.7 (60.3)	23.4 (74.1)	29.9 (85.8)	32.3 (90.1)	32.8 (91.0)	32.1 (89.8)	26.5 (79.7)	18.7 (65.7)	13.1 (55.6)	10.6 (51.1)	32.8 (91.0)
Mean daily maximum °C (°F)	−2.7 (27.1)	−2.7 (27.1)	2.0 (35.6)	8.9 (48.0)	15.9 (60.6)	20.0 (68.0)	22.6 (72.7)	20.9 (69.6)	15.1 (59.2)	7.8 (46.0)	2.5 (36.5)	−0.6 (30.9)	9.1 (48.4)
Daily mean °C (°F)	−5.4 (22.3)	−5.9 (21.4)	−2.1 (28.2)	3.9 (39.0)	10.3 (50.5)	14.7 (58.5)	17.4 (63.3)	15.7 (60.3)	10.7 (51.3)	5.0 (41.0)	0.6 (33.1)	−2.8 (27.0)	5.2 (41.4)
Mean daily minimum °C (°F)	−8.6 (16.5)	−9.4 (15.1)	−6.3 (20.7)	−0.8 (30.6)	4.4 (39.9)	9.2 (48.6)	12.2 (54.0)	10.9 (51.6)	6.8 (44.2)	2.2 (36.0)	−1.6 (29.1)	−5.5 (22.1)	1.1 (34.0)
Record low °C (°F)	−39.4 (−38.9)	−40.4 (−40.7)	−30.9 (−23.6)	−22.4 (−8.3)	−6.1 (21.0)	−2.0 (28.4)	1.7 (35.1)	−0.5 (31.1)	−7.5 (18.5)	−17.0 (1.4)	−24.3 (−11.7)	−33.7 (−28.7)	−40.4 (−40.7)
Source 1: FMI normals 1991-2020
Source 2: Record highs and lows

== Military ==
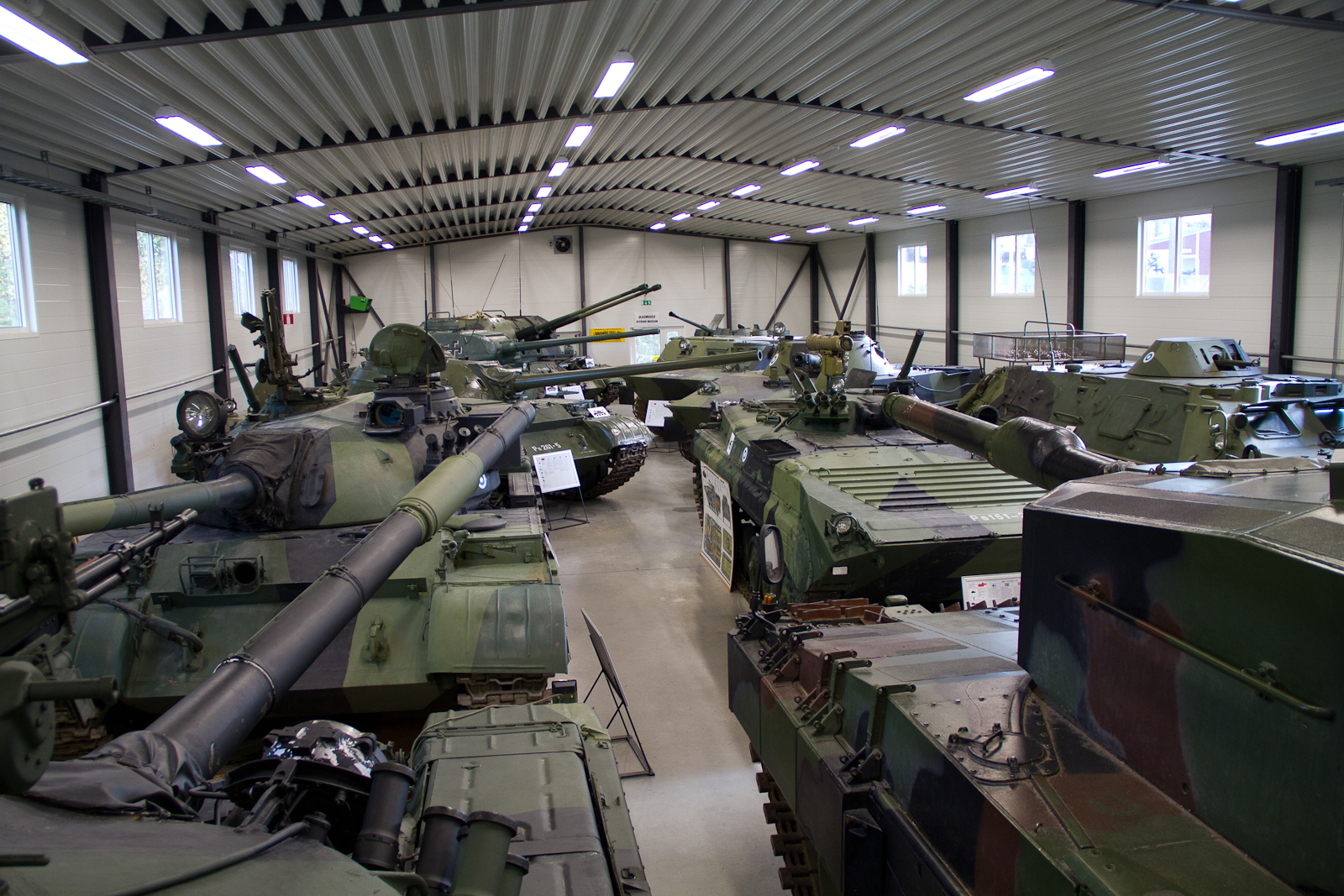
Parola Armour Museum.

Hattula has strong military connections due to the Parolannummi garrison located in its seat, Parola. A notable monument there is the Lion of Parola, a bronze lion statue commemorating Emperor Alexander II's 1863 visit. The Parola area has been a military training ground since 1777 and historically hosted infantry and cavalry men during the 17th century.

== Churches ==
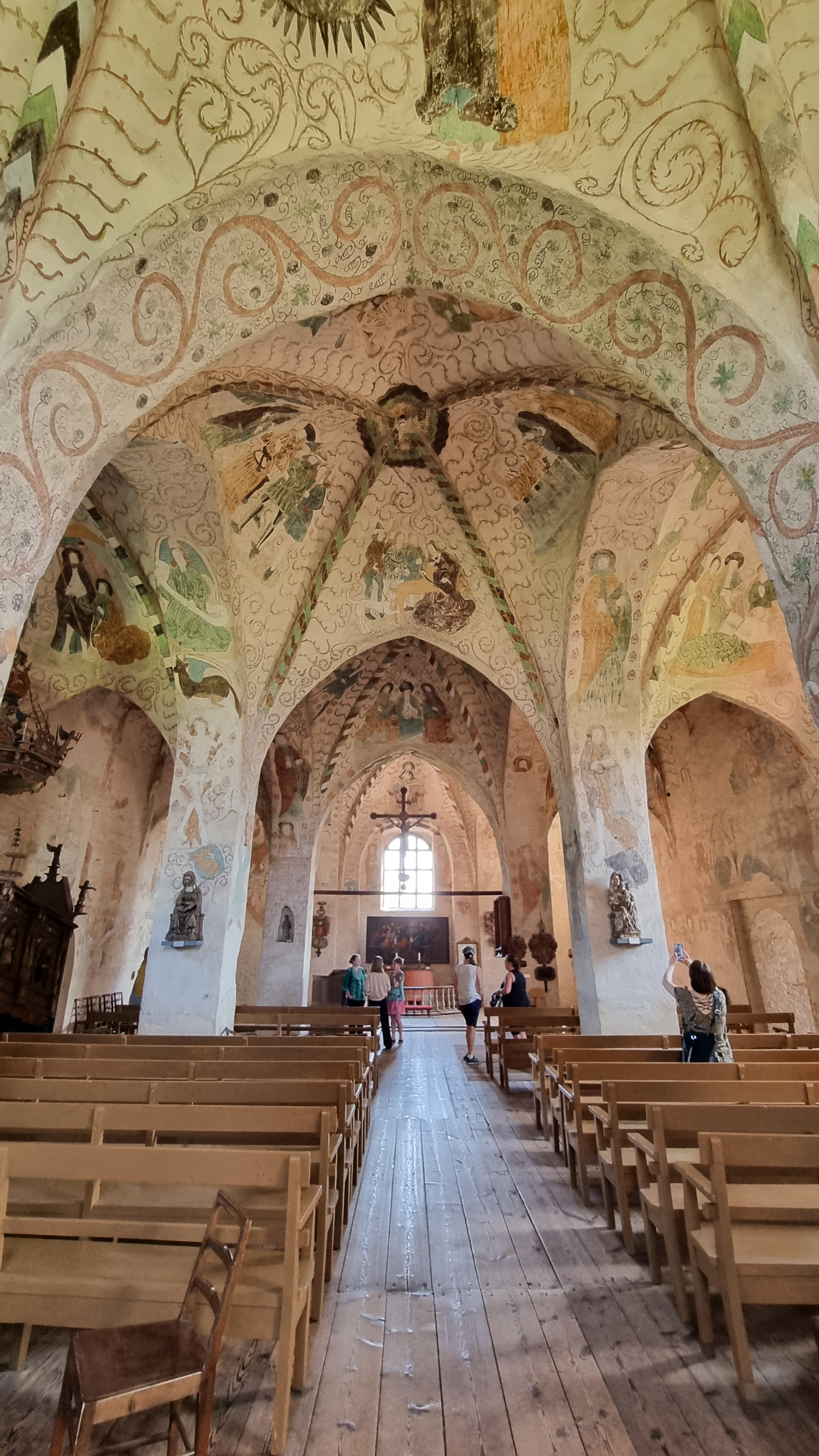
Frescoes at Hattula Holy Cross Church.

The municipality has three Evangelical Lutheran churches: the medieval Holy Cross Church, the 19th-century Hattula Church, and the Tyrväntö Church built between the late 18th and early 19th centuries. Aside from these, the Pentecostal Church's Home Church operates in the municipality center.

== Manor culture ==
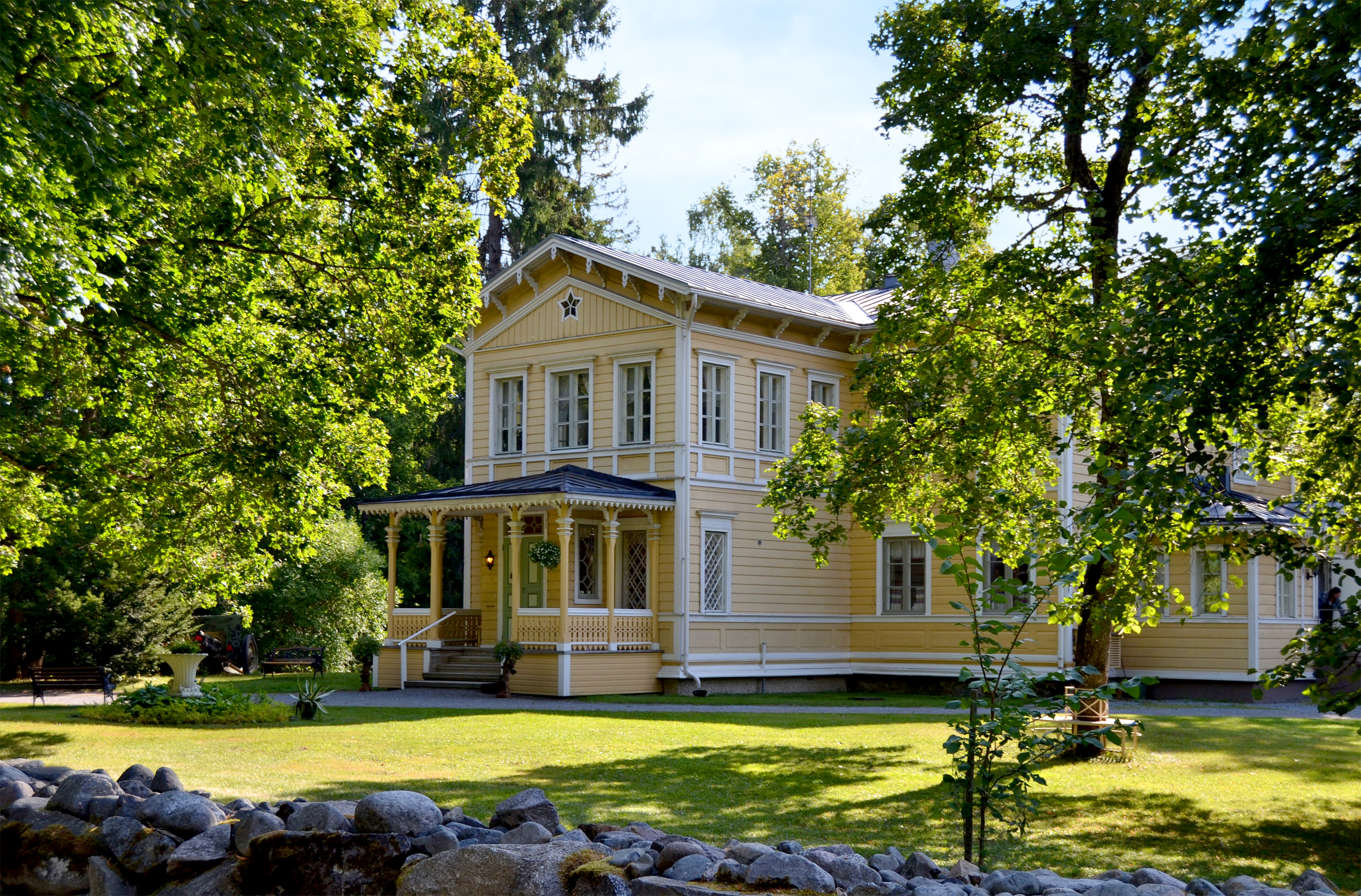
Inkala Manor.

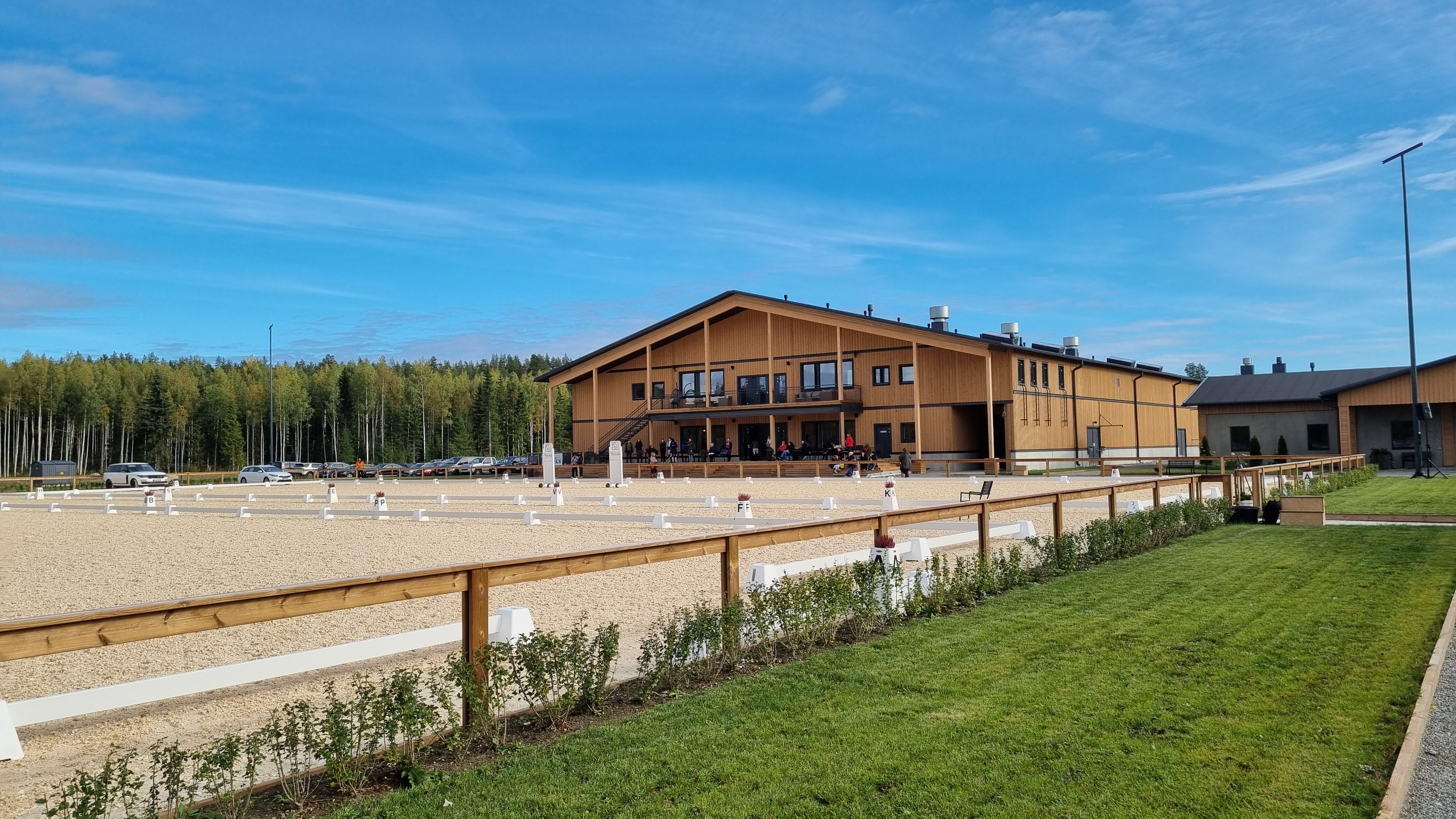
Wesunda Dressage at Vesunta Manor.

Hattula is also distinguished by its manor culture, with several historic estates such as Ahlbacka, Ellilä, Metsänkylä, Lepaa, Lahdentaka, Suontaka, and Vesunta. The Vesunta Manor was once the personal property of King of Sweden Gustav Vasa. Lahdentaka Manor has one of the oldest English landscape gardens in Finland. The founder of Nokia Fredrik Idestam was born at Lahdentaka Manor. Suontaka Manor breeds organic cattle, and it was the first farm in Finland, which bred Ayrshire cattle. The historic Hämeen Härkätie road, an ancient trade route connecting Hämeenlinna to Turku, passes through parts of the municipality in the villages of Kivijoki and Kouvala.

In the nature of Hattula, one can encounter pheasants. In particular, the Aulanko and Vanajanlinna manors in Hämeenlinna introduced pheasants into the wild so that the manors' hunting parties could go pheasant hunting. The pheasant population in Hattula is partly due to businessman Karl Fazer, as he donated pheasants to the owner of Vanajanlinna, business magnate Carl Wilhelm Rosenlew.

In 2024, the Wesunda Dressage equestrian center was opened by entrepreneur Heidi Taipale in the area of Vesunta Manor. The equestrian center features modern horse stables, an indoor riding arena and riding hall, and a competition arena meeting international standards.

== Education ==
Hattula has four daycare centers, and the municipality provides preschool education. Hattula has five primary schools and one lower secondary school. The schools are Juteini School, Parola School, Parola Joint School, Lepaa School, Pekola School, and Nihattula School. Hattula also has Parola Upper Secondary School. The municipality is also home to Häme Vocational Institute, Vanajavesi Community College, and the Sibelius Institute, which focuses on music and dance.

At Häme Vocational Institute, one can study the production of liqueurs, country wines, craft beers, carbonated alcoholic beverages, and distilled spirits. Degrees can be completed in Lepaa.

At Häme University of Applied Sciences' Lepaa campus, one can study bioeconomy, horticulture, and the built environment.

== Lepaa Horticultural Institute ==
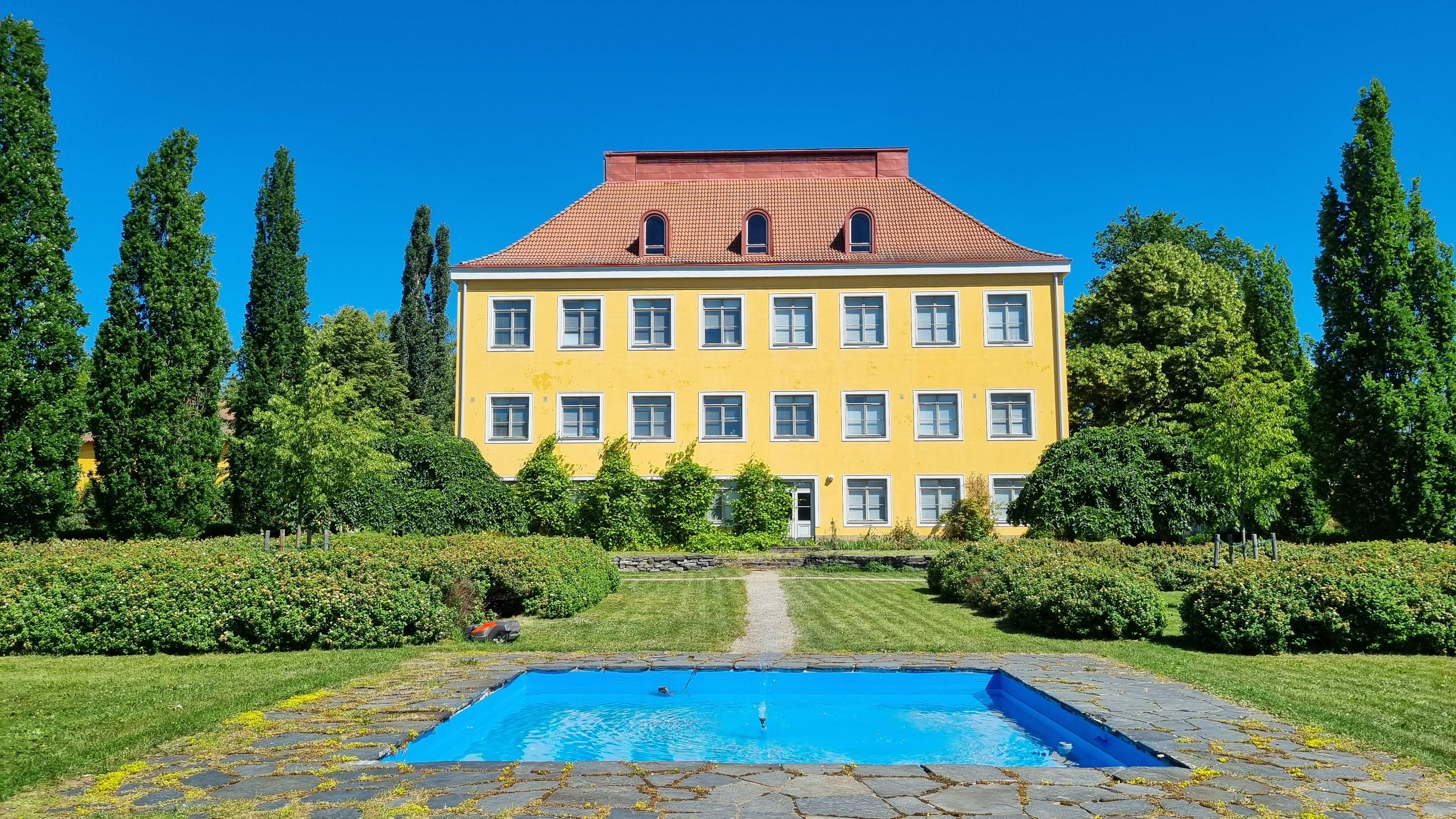
Lepaa Horticultural Institute.

The Lepaa Horticultural Institute was founded on the former lands of the Lepaa Manor, whose history dates back to the Middle Ages in the 1400s. The manor's owner, Karl Fredrik Packalén, bequeathed the estate to the state in 1902 on the condition that an agricultural or horticultural school would be established and maintained there. Teaching began in 1912. A horticultural school was founded alongside it in 1923. Today, the Lepaa Horticultural Institute operates as part of Häme University of Applied Sciences.

== Lepaa Winery and Brewery ==
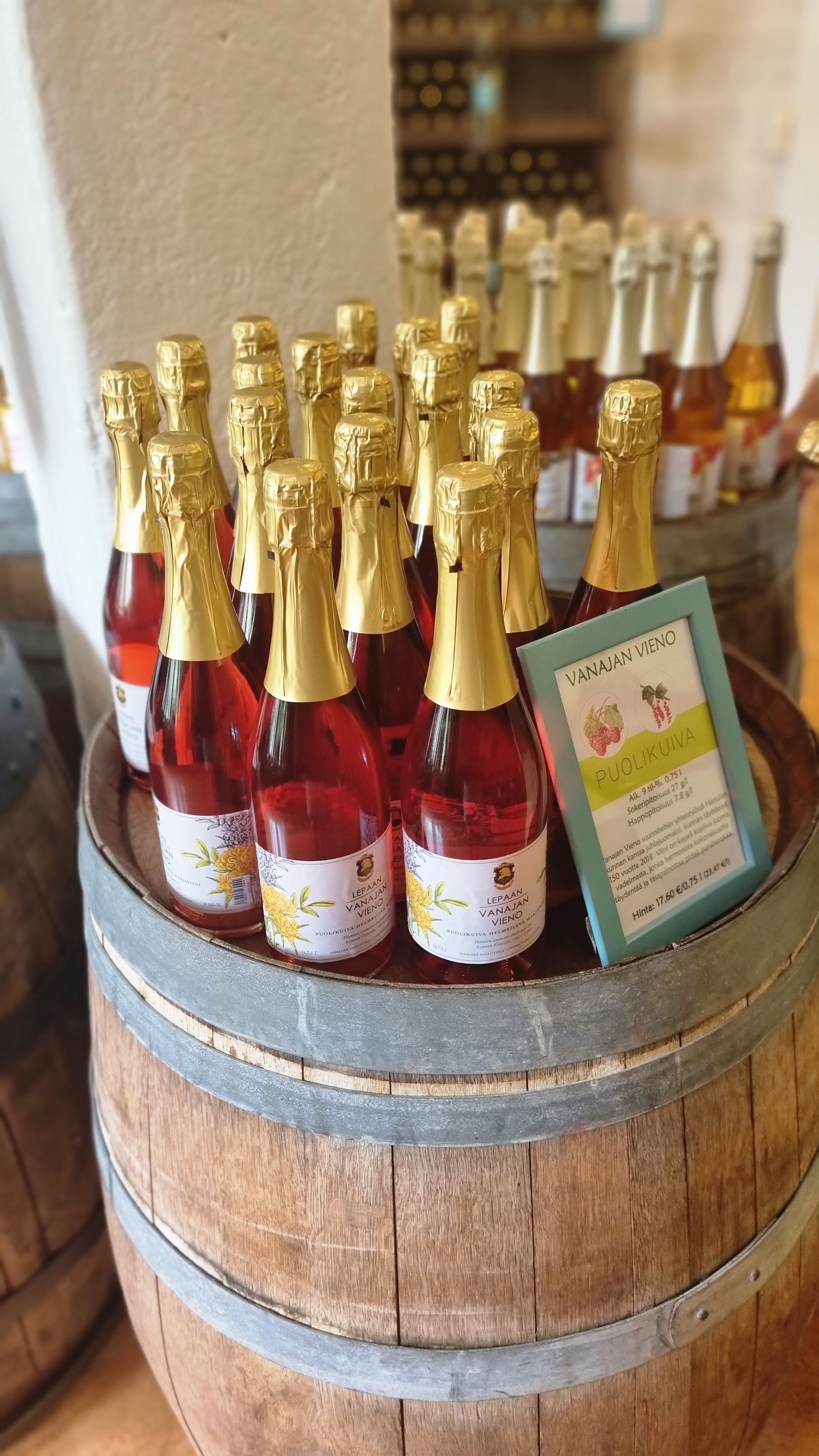
Lepaa Wiinery,

Lepaa Winery produces wines and ciders from locally grown fruits and berries. The winery and brewery are located on the Lepaa campus and operates in an historical building from around 1910. It produces about 15,000 to 20,000 liters of berry and fruit-based wines annually, including sparkling wines, ciders, and liqueurs. Lepaan Panimo (Lepaa Brewery) produces beer. The winery also offers wine tastings, a wine shop, a café, and wine production education. Lepaa Winery is a popular destination and part of the horticultural tradition at Lepaa.

== Industries ==
Hattula's main industries include a combination of historical tourism, agriculture, and manufacturing. Agriculture in the region complements this, particularly horticulture and fruit and berry wine production at Lepaa.

Hattula is known for its extensive and high-quality cattle farming. The high-quality Hereford and Ayrshire production of Hattula is recognised beyond the locality.

Hattula is involved in ongoing renewable energy projects that could significantly boost local revenues. There are efforts to attract new residents and businesses, with new construction zones being developed.

== Transport ==
Hattula is served by the Parola Railway Station since 1876, one of Finland's original railway stations, located along the Helsinki–Tampere railway line.

== Famous people ==
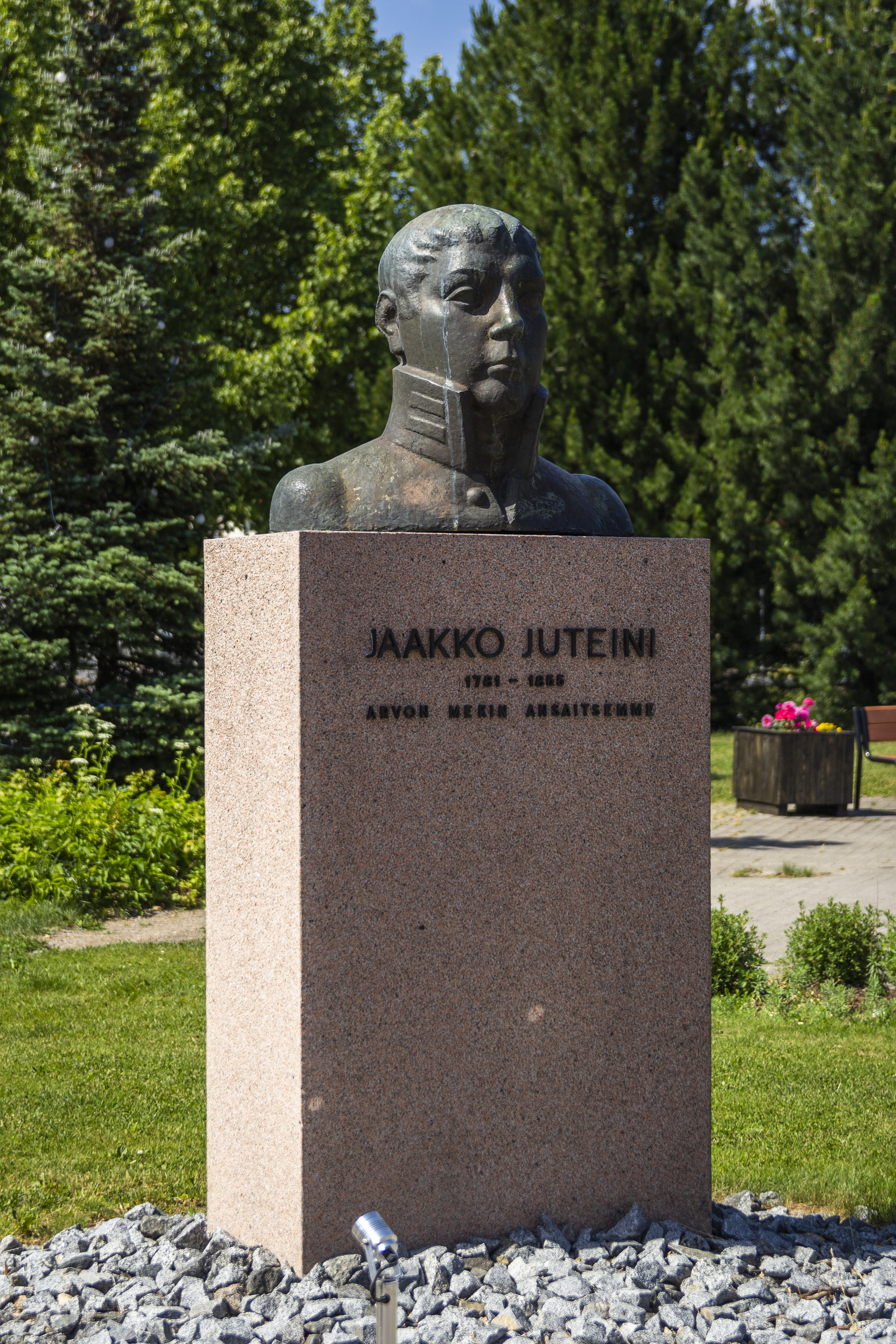
Statue of Jaakko Juteini.

Prominent cultural figures associated with Hattula include Jaakko Juteini, a Finnish nationalist writer born in 1781, and astronomer Anders Planman.

== In popular culture ==
The film The Unknown Soldier, produced by Suomen Filmiteollisuus and directed by Edvin Laine, was partly shot in Parola. Prime Minister Urho Kekkonen granted permission for the use of a tank, which the production team obtained in Parola. The scenes in which Urho Hietanen destroys a tank, as well as the scene of Vilho Koskela's death, were filmed there.

== Attractions ==
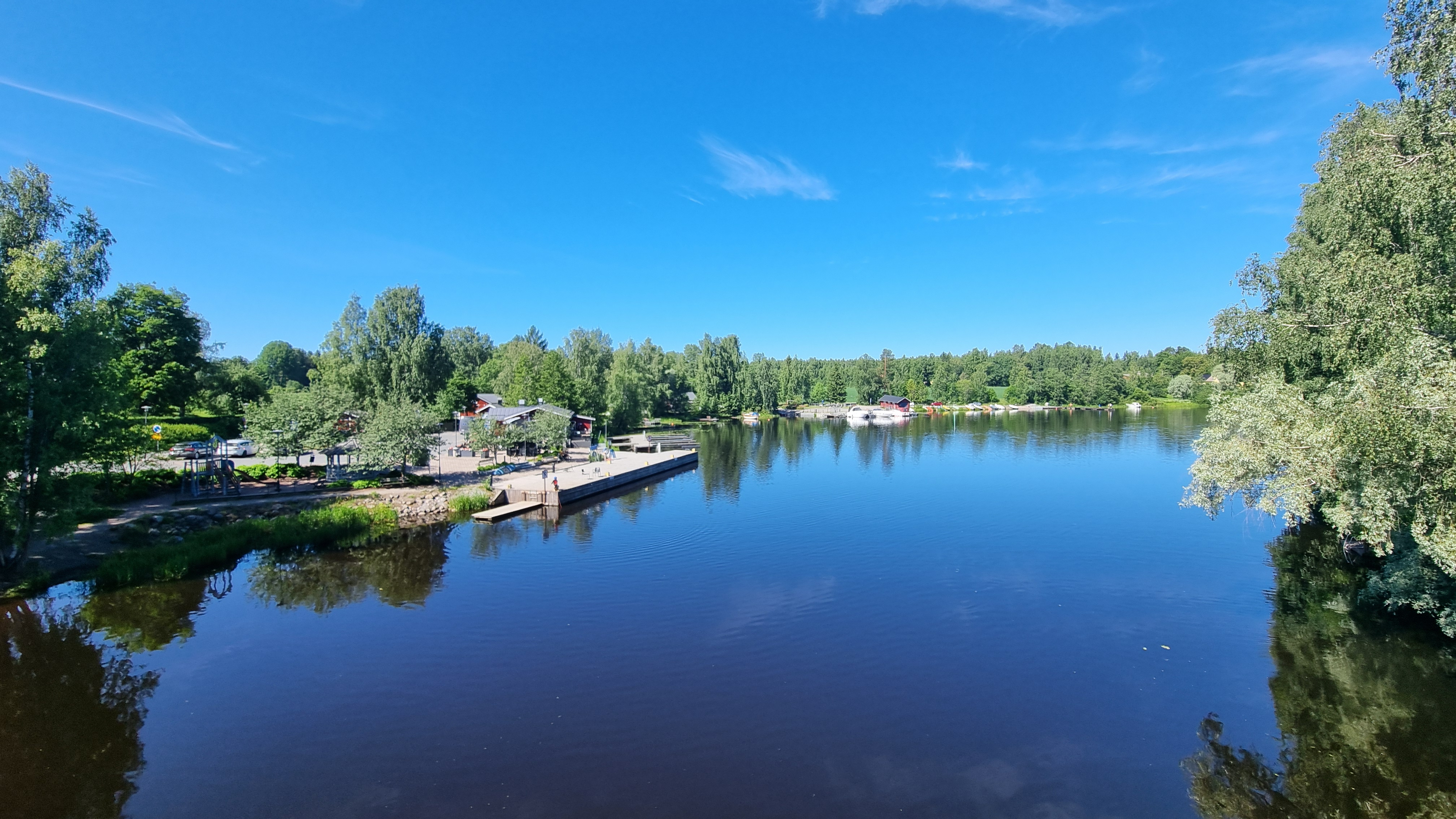
Mierola marina pictured from the Mierola Bridge.

Hattula also features the Mierola Bridge, one of Finland's early concrete bridges constructed shortly after the Finnish Civil War in 1919. Next to the Mierola Bridge is the Mierola marina, which also has a café-restaurant. The municipality boasts a multipurpose center and a municipal library named after Juteini. Additionally, Lepaa has a notable horticultural institute and winery producing domestic Finnish wines, alongside a gardening museum and clay workshop. Parola Tank Museum has a vast collection of tanks, and the Lion of Parola is nearby. Recreational opportunities in Hattula include boating, horseriding, football, golf, frisbee golf, theatre, swimming, hiking, skating, and other outdoor activities.

In Hattula and its surroundings, golf is a popular hobby. Hattula has two golf courses, namely Hattula Golf and Lepaa Golf. In Hattula's neighboring municipality of Hämeenlinna, there is the so-called "Tiilaakso" (“Tee Valley”), which has four golf courses.

== Gallery ==
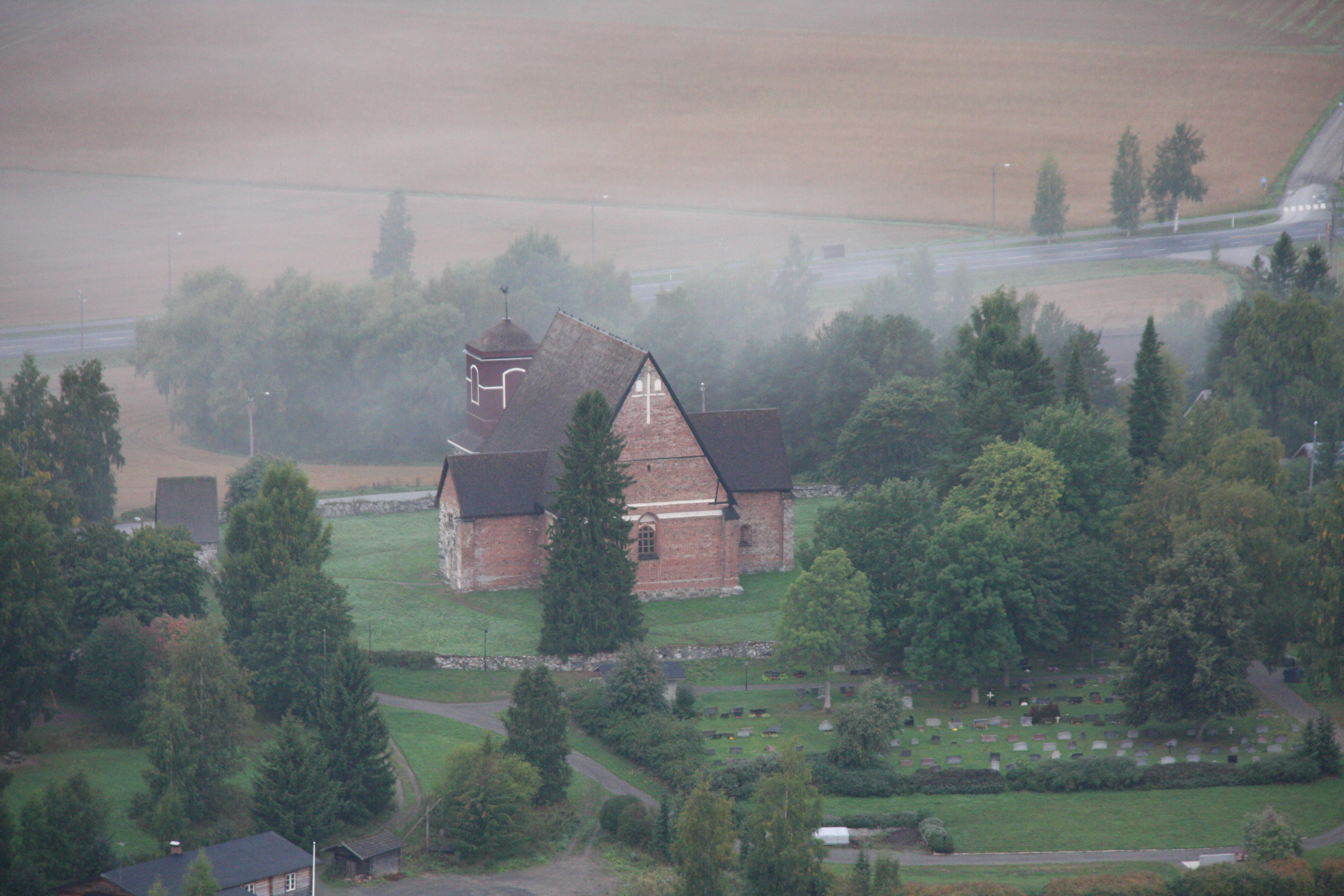
Hattula Holy Cross Church.

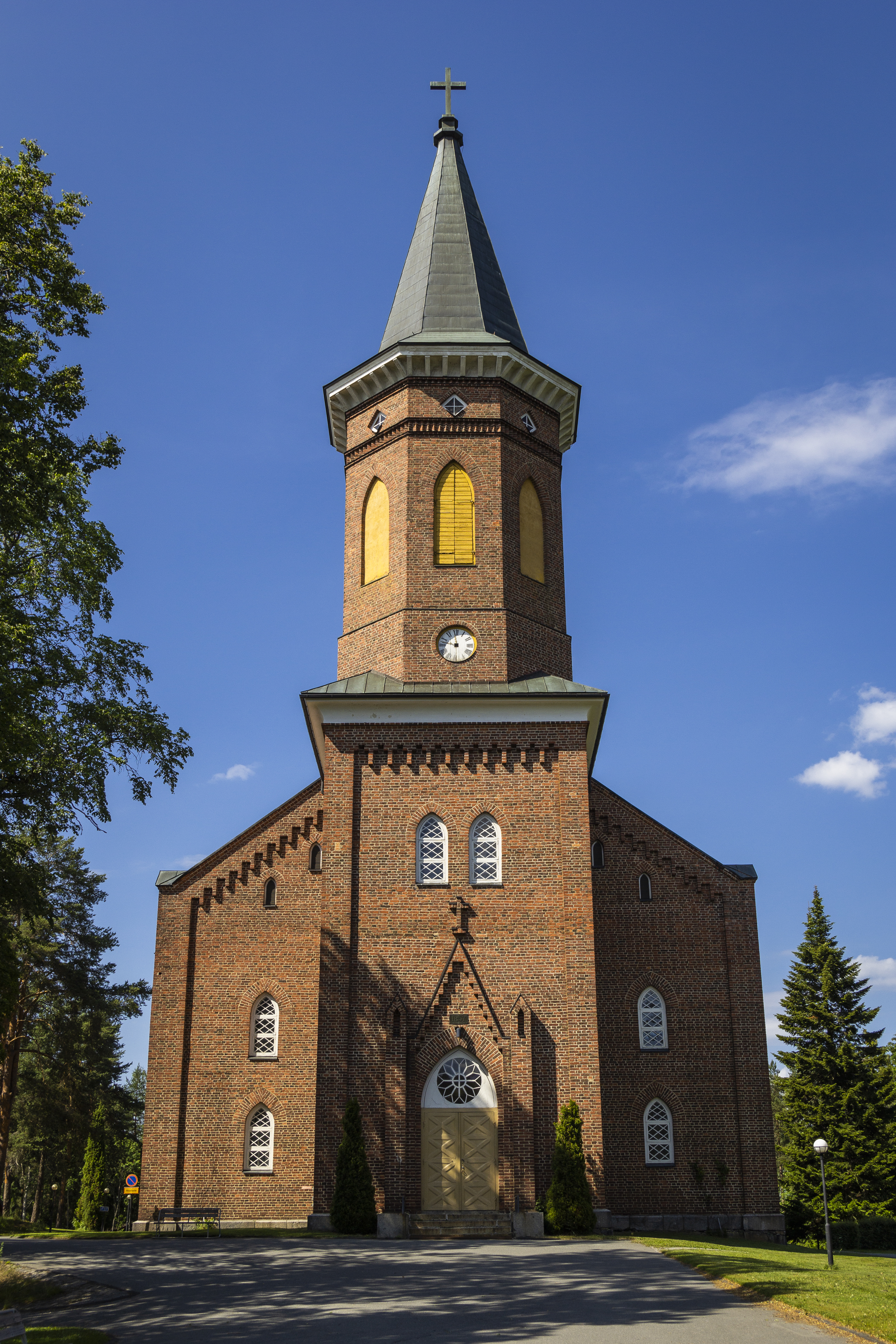
New Church.

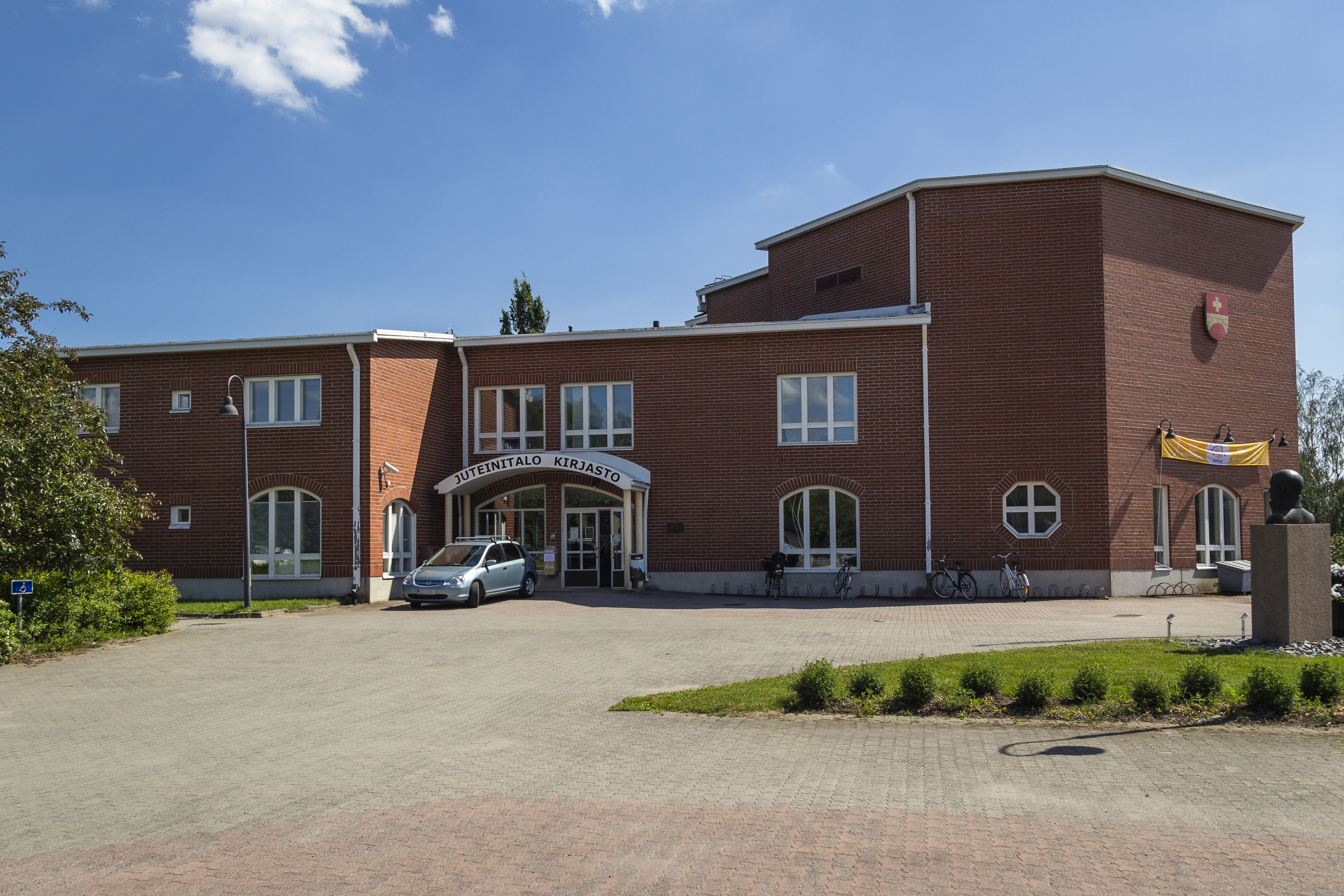
Library is located at the Juteini House.

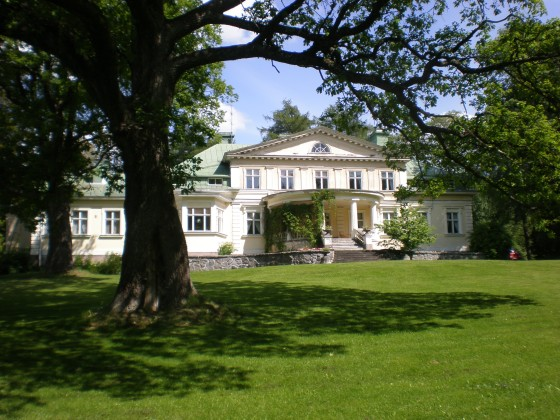
Ahlbacka Manor.

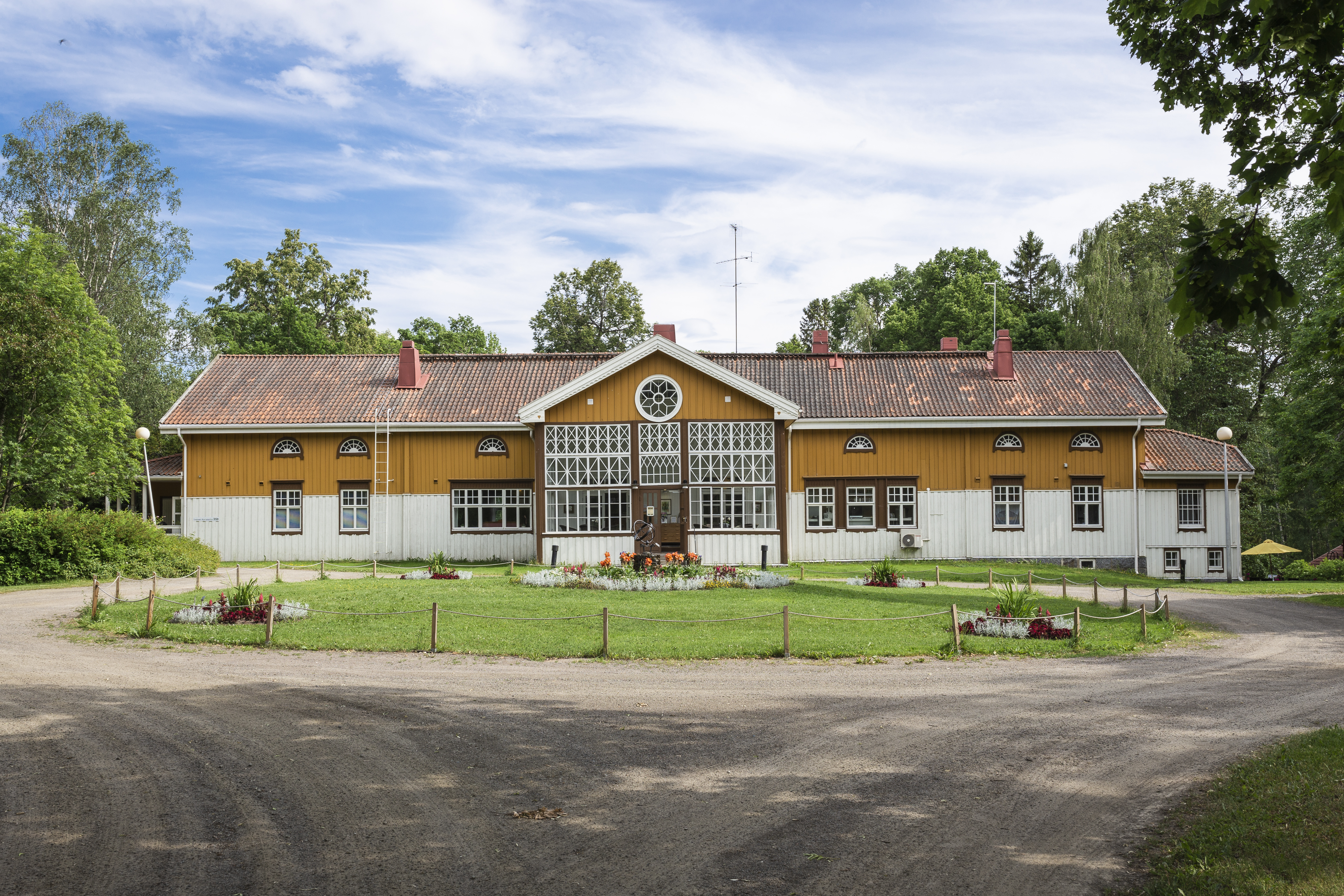
Lepaa Manor.

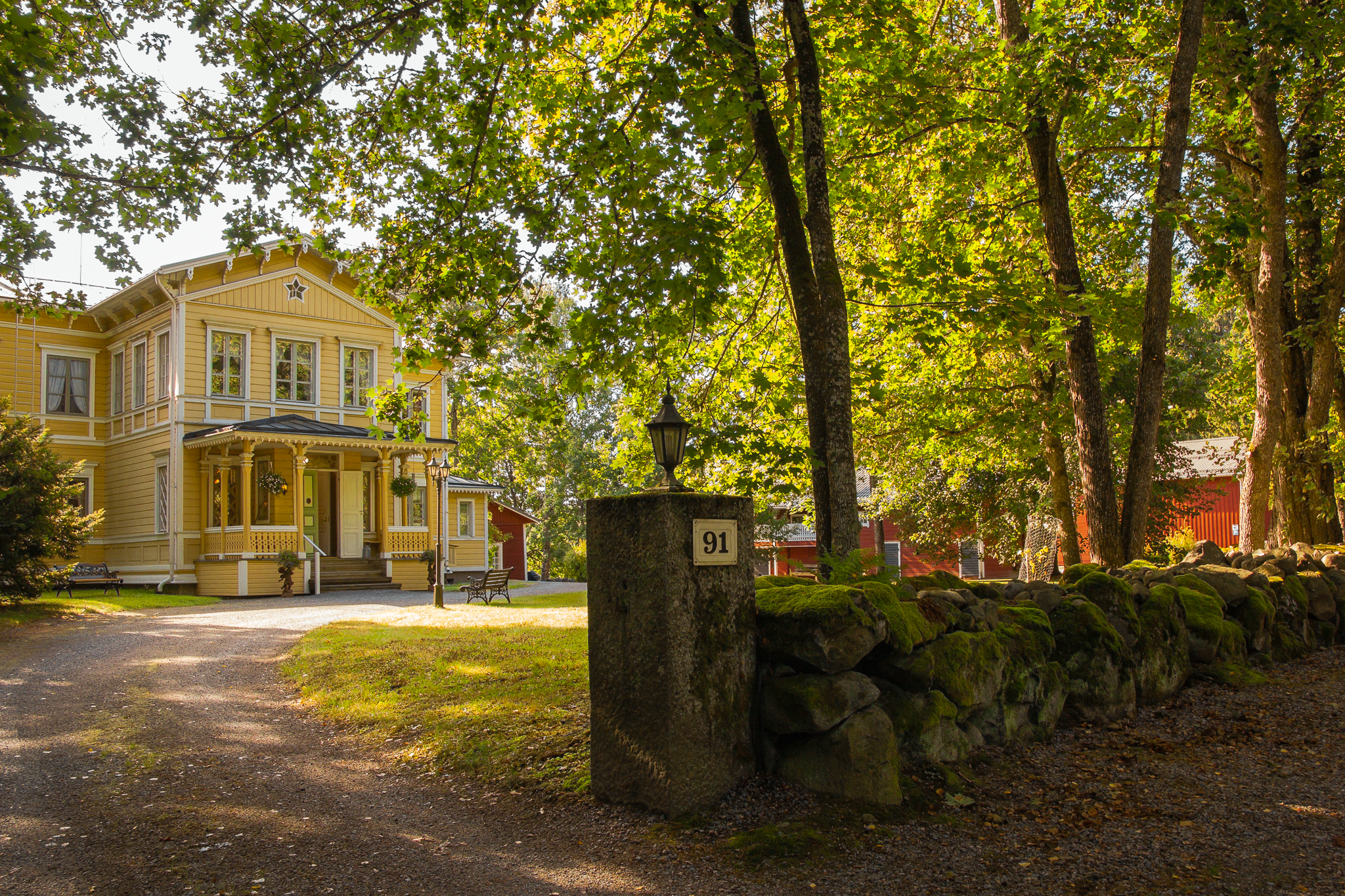
Inkala Mansion.

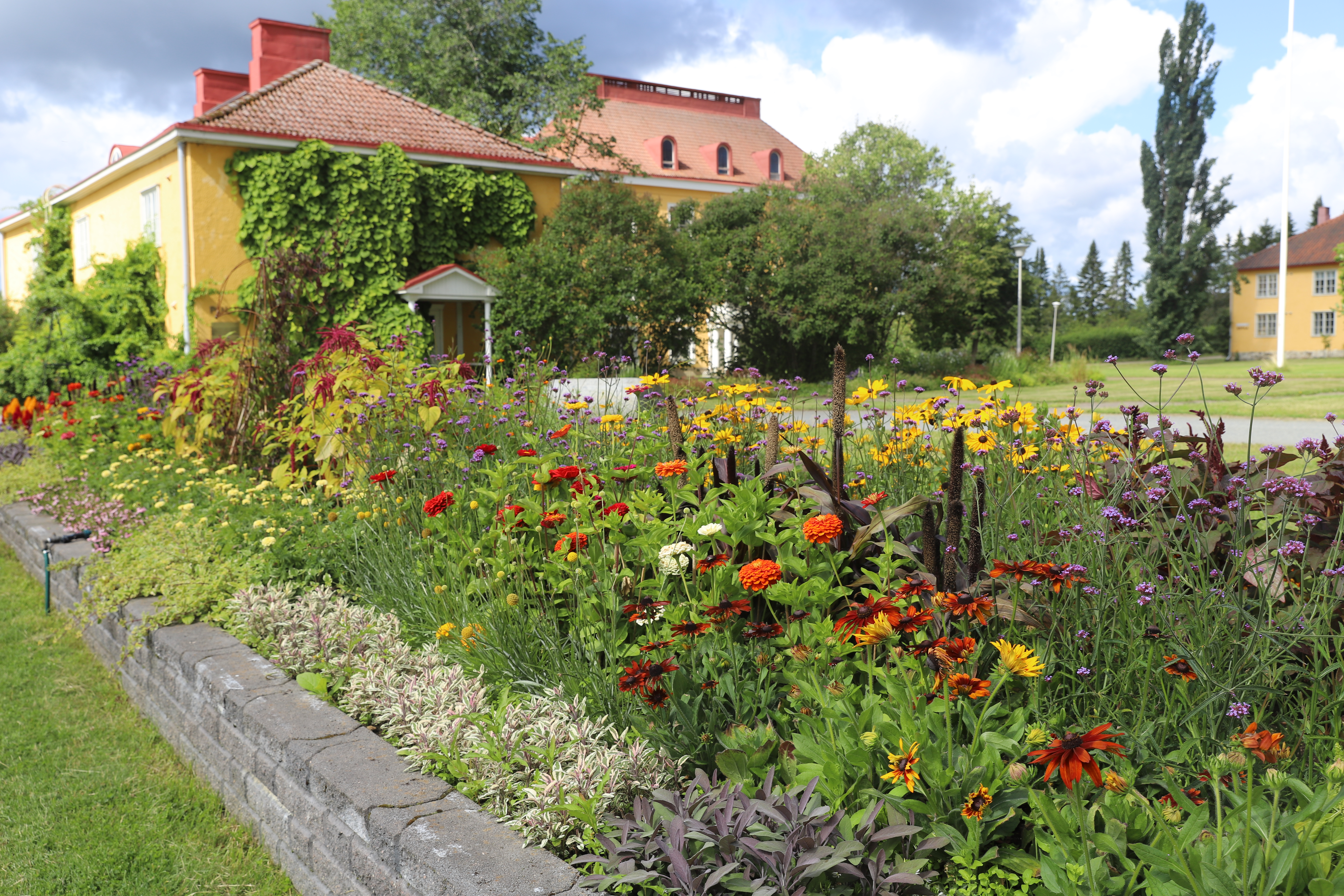
Institute of Horticulture in Lepaa and vineyard.

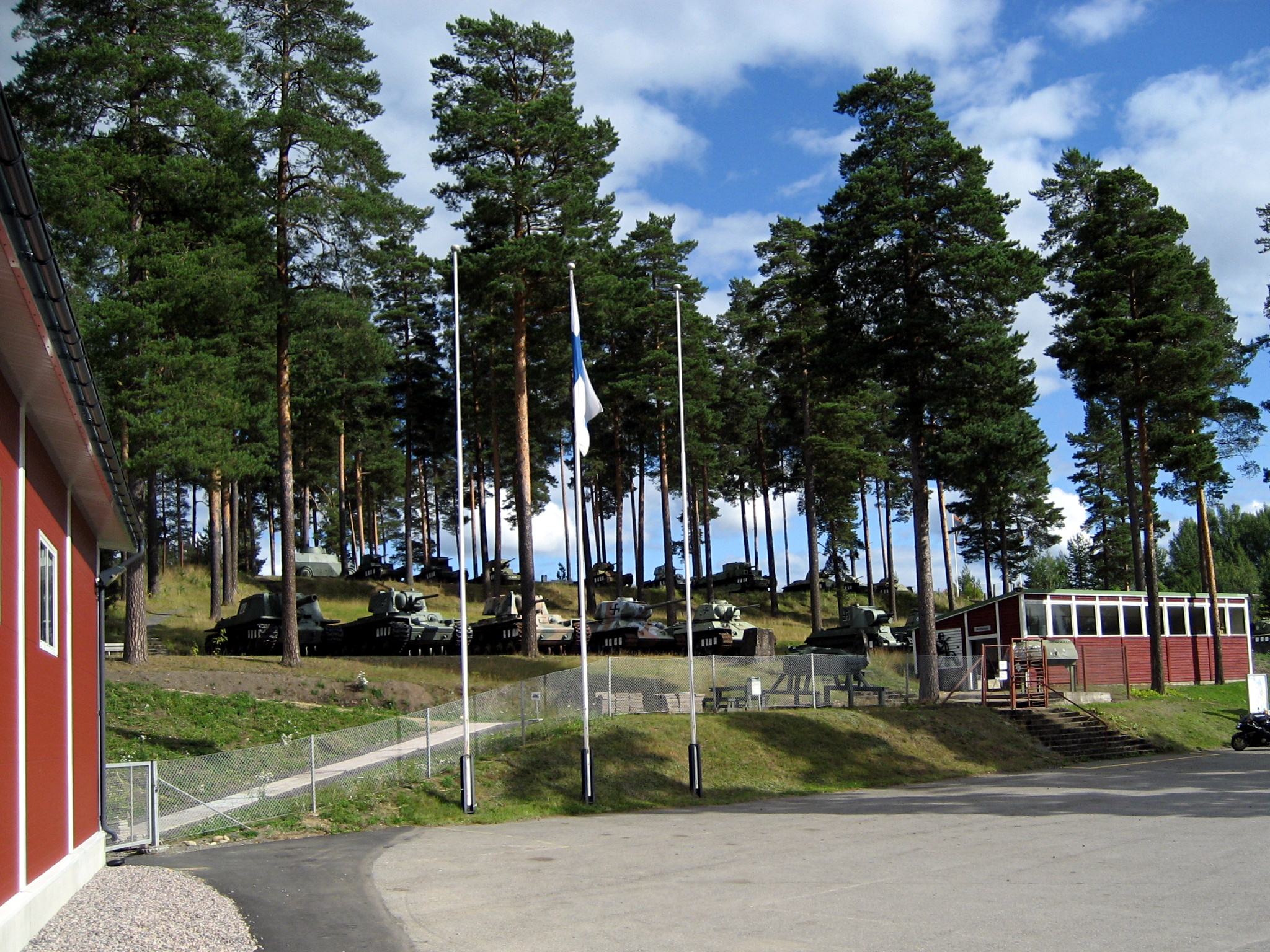
Armour Museum.

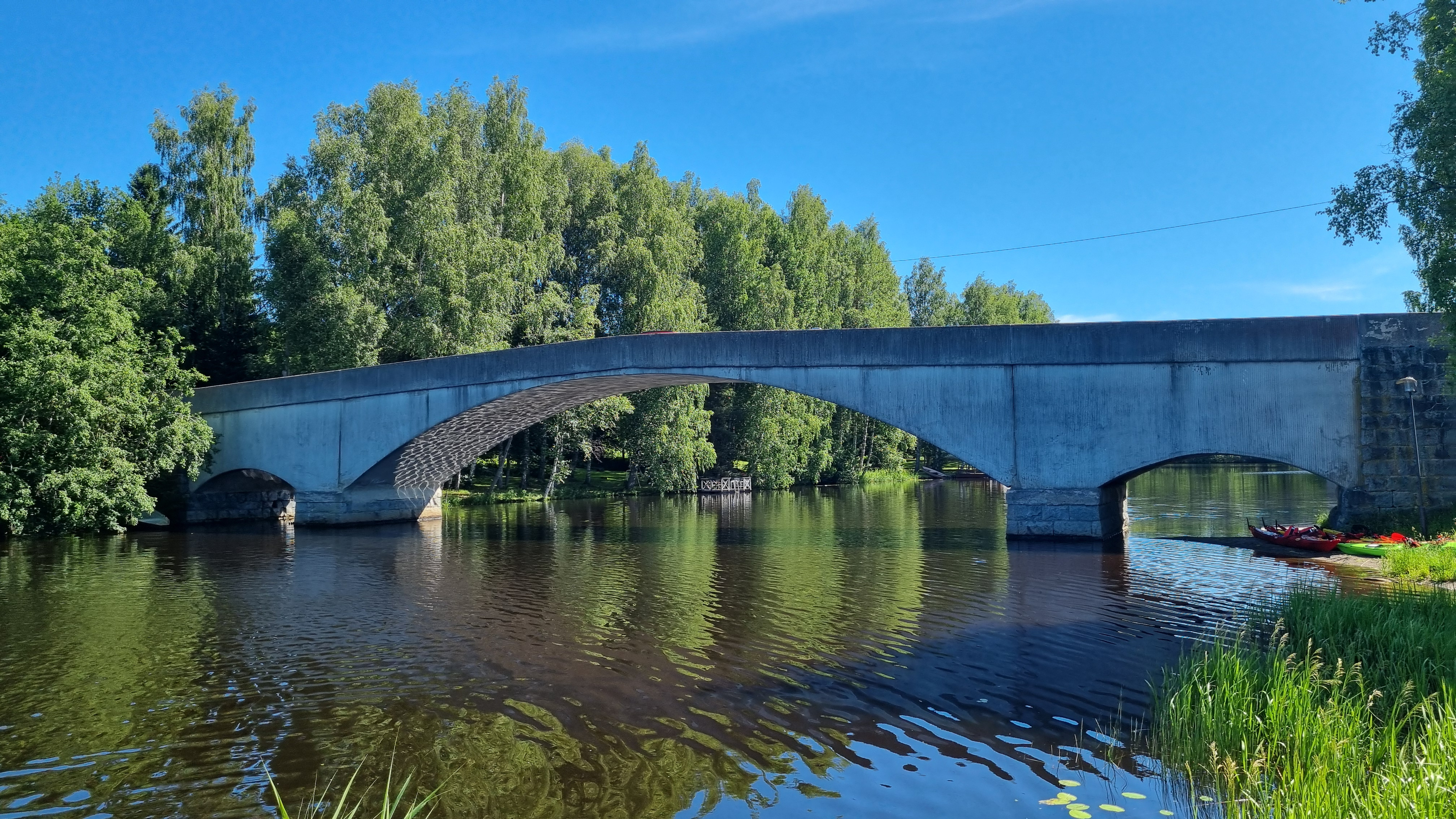
Mierola Bridge.

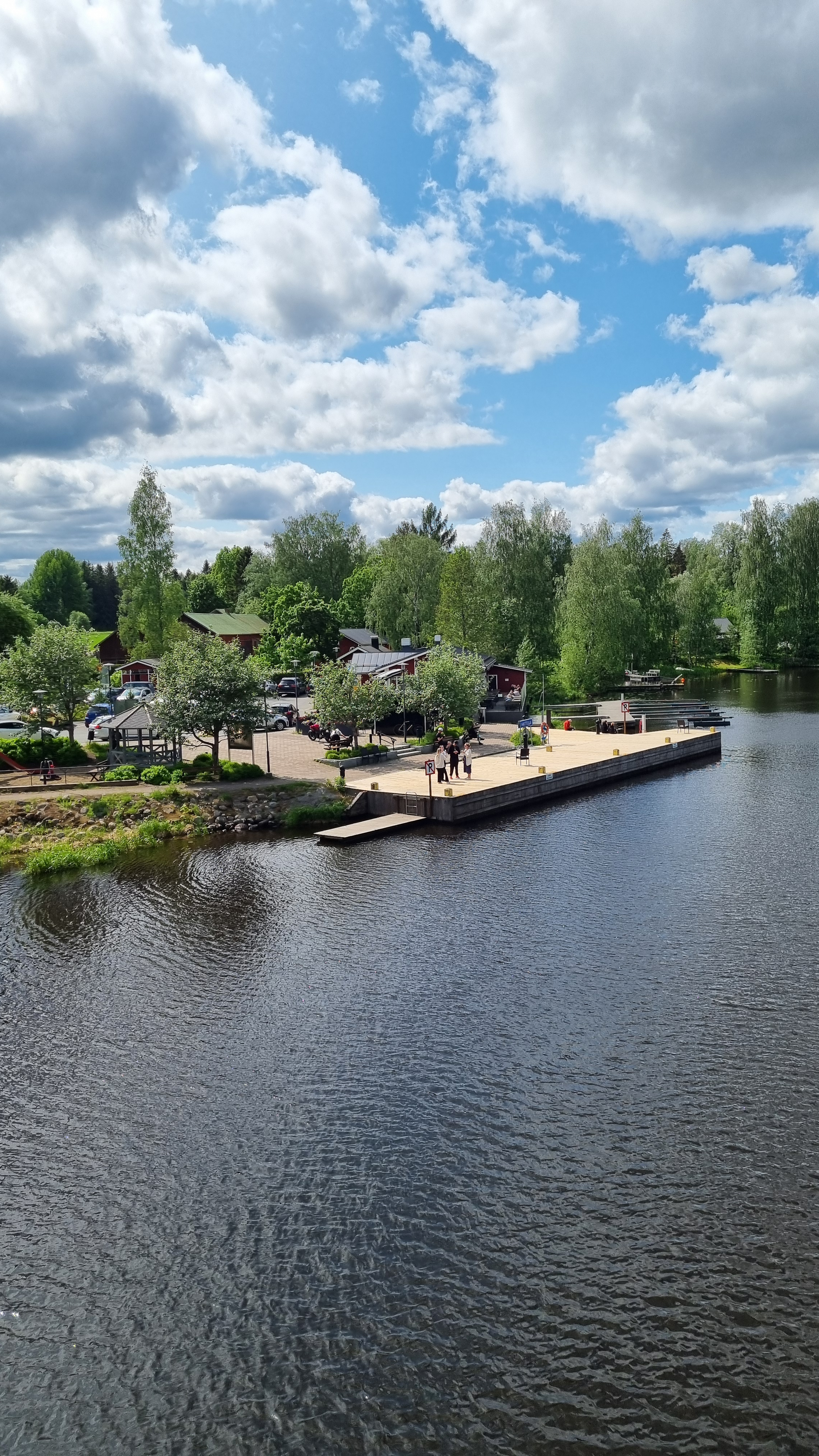
Mierola Marina.

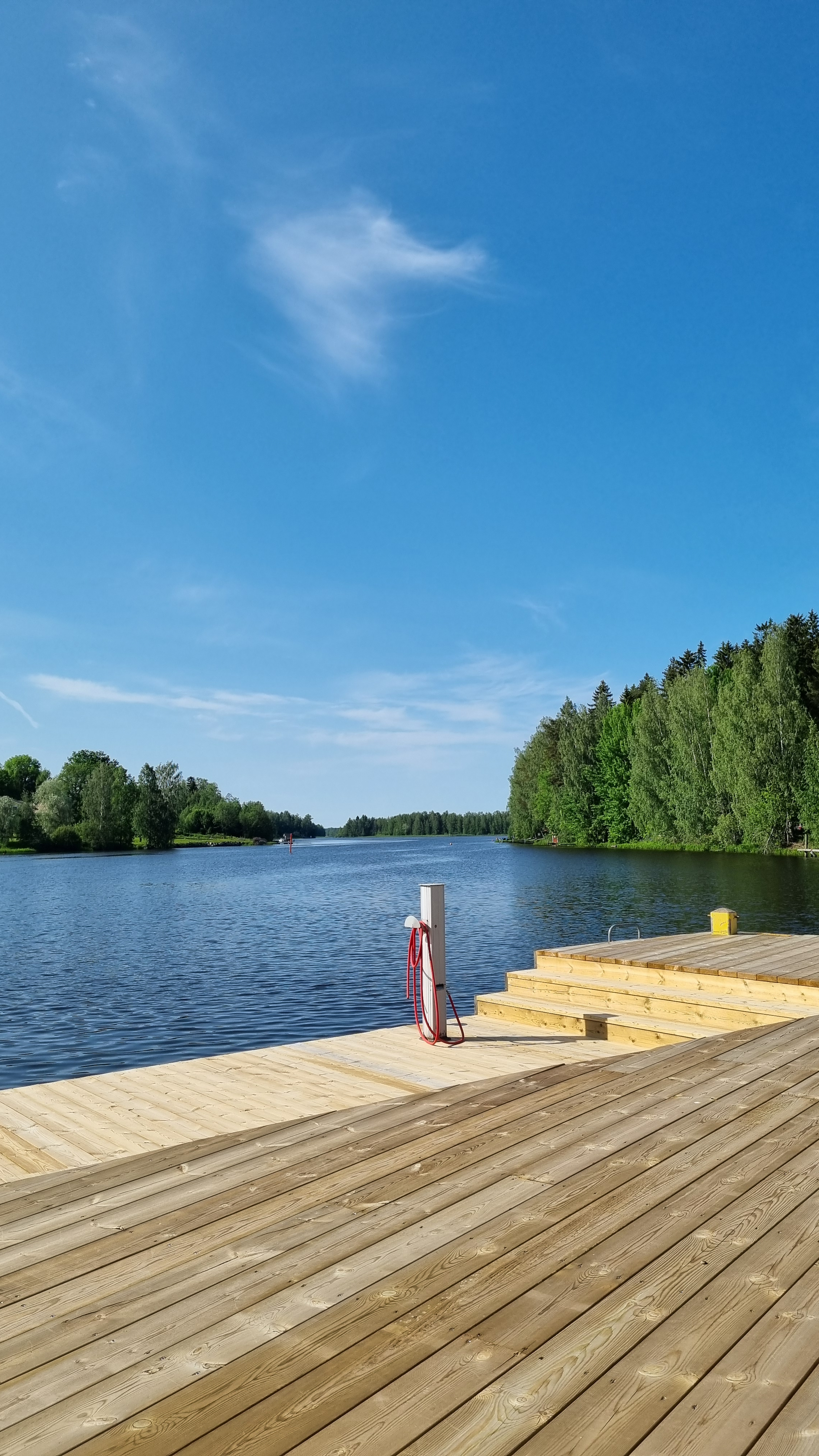
Mierola Marina.

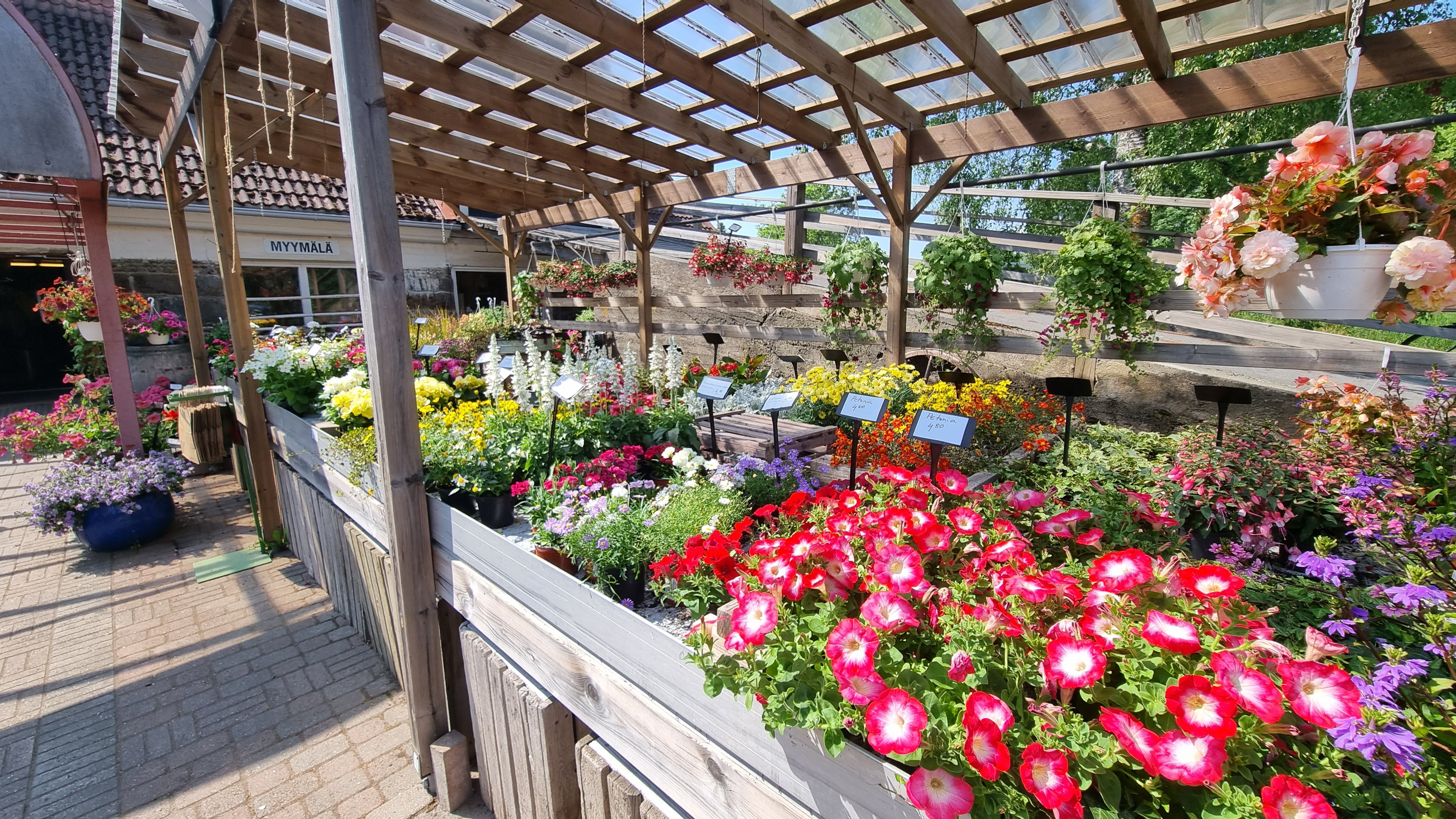
Lepaa Garden and Wine Shop.

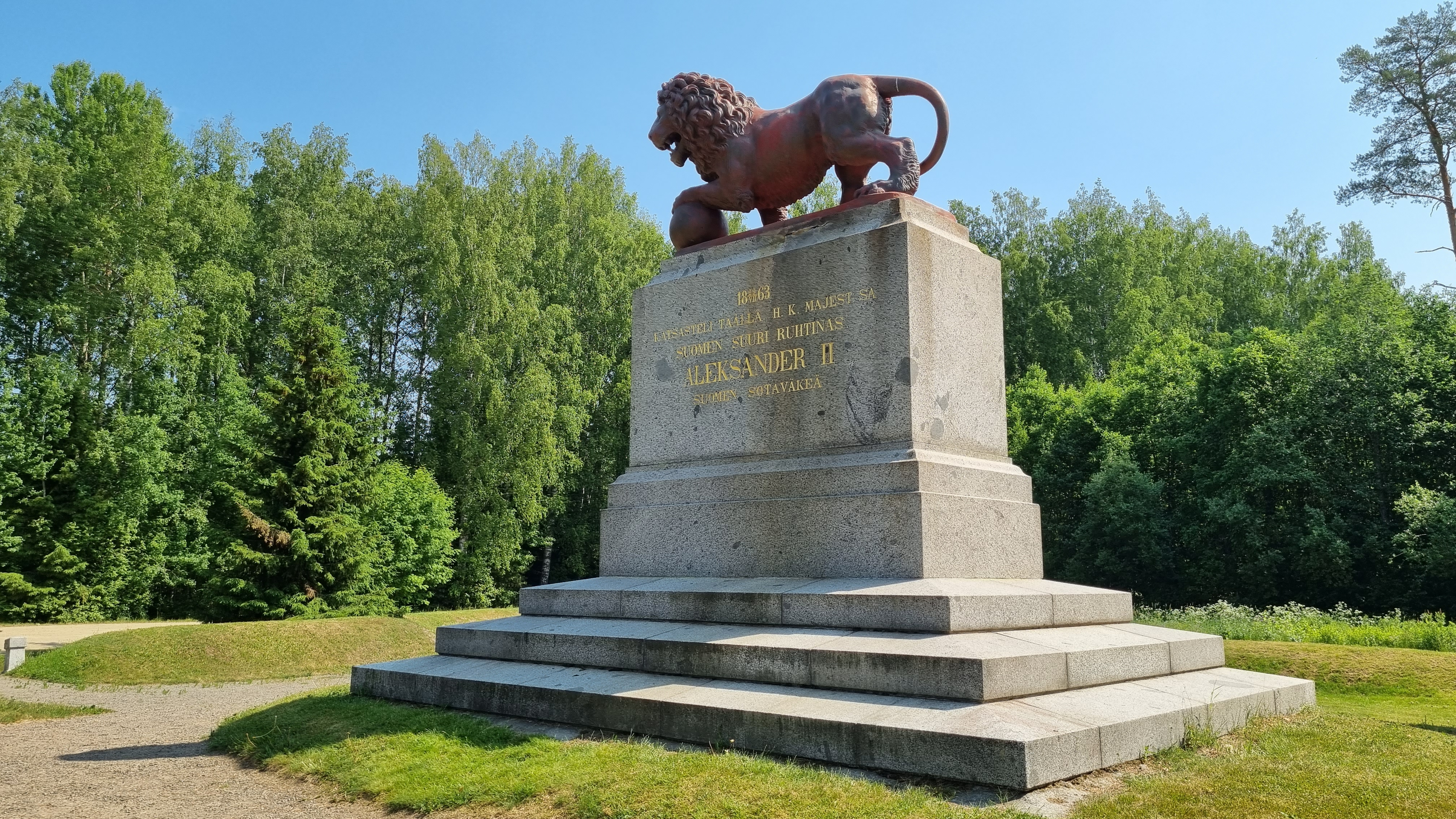
The Lion of Parola.

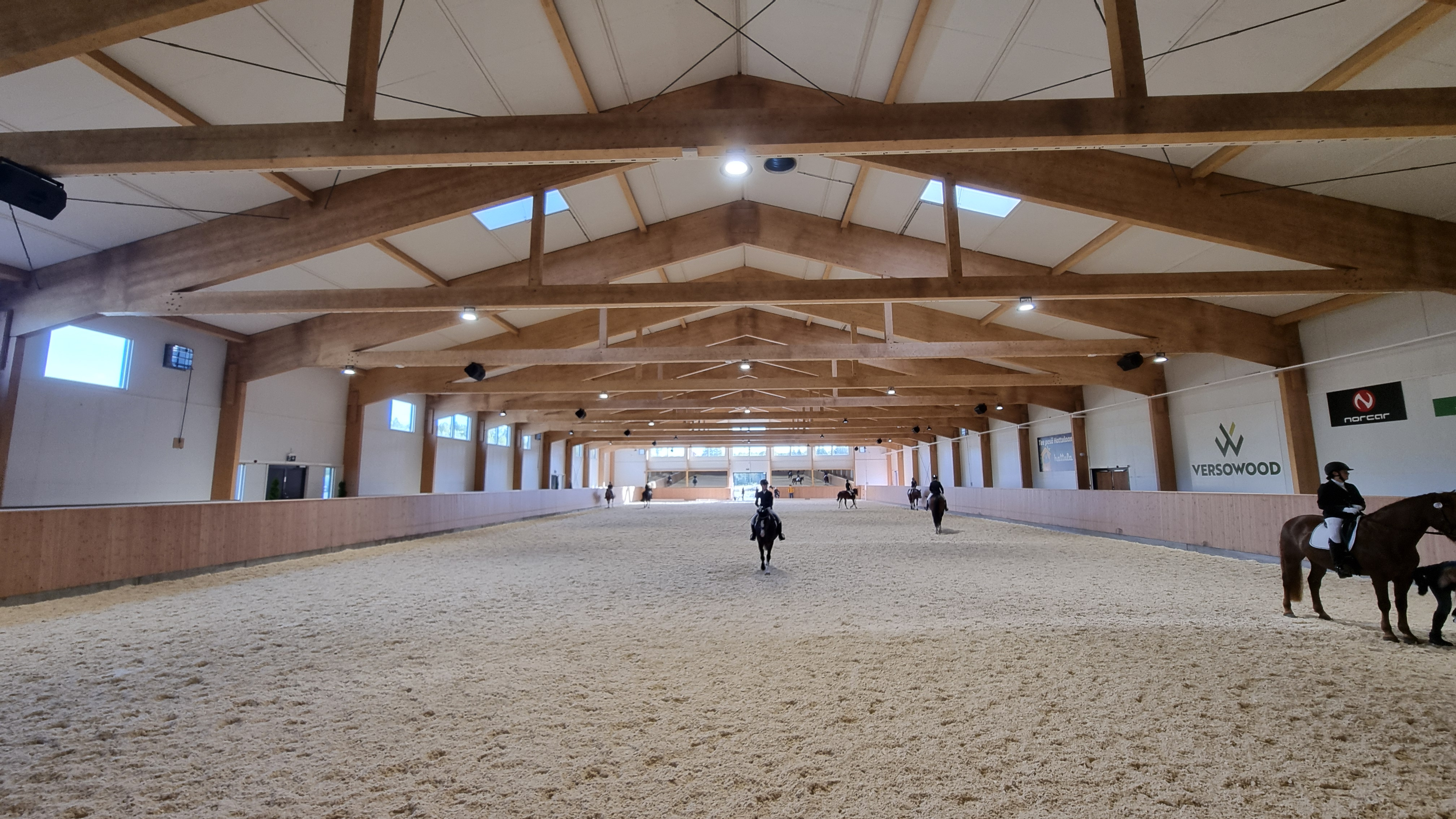
Wesunda Dressage's Riding Hall.

== See also ==
- Parola
- Parola Tank Museum
- Lion of Parola
- Hattula Holy Cross Church
- Hämeenlinna
- Janakkala
