= Anders Planman =

Finnish astronomer, professor of physics and mathematician

Anders Planman (1724 – 25 April 1803) was a Finnish astronomer, professor of physics and mathematician. He was one of the first people to make systematical astronomical observations in Finland.

== Life ==
Planman was born in Hattula. He came from a Swedish-speaking Finnish family and his father was a lieutenant. He studied at the Royal Academy of Turku from 1744 to 1754 and then continued his studies at Uppsala University. In 1756 he received the grade of docent in astronomy. In 1763 he was appointed professor of physics in Turku and retained the position until 1801, when he quit due to poor health. For three years he was also head of the academy. Because the tenureship as a professor was sometimes without a salary, Planman had also been ordained and worked as parish priest in Nousiainen and Paimio. From 1767 he was a member of the Royal Swedish Academy of Sciences. He was also a member of the Royal Society of Sciences in Uppsala.

== Work ==
Planman was one of the first individuals to make systematic astronomical observations in Finland. He made his most important observations during the transits of Venus in 1761 and 1769. The Royal Swedish Academy of Sciences provided money for expeditions to the north of Finland (Lapland) to make the observations. The overarching aim of these expeditions was to contribute to the measurement of the solar parallax. By participating in the expeditions and also by working with data supplied to him the academy in Stockholm, he developed a new method to calculate the parallax. His own observations in 1761 were not very precise but those made by him in 1769 were considered some of the most exact in Europe. He took an active part in the then on-going debate on whether or not Venus had an atmosphere. During the expedition in 1761, he also calculated the correct longitude for six locations on the way, among them Kajaani, Mikkeli and Hämeenlinna. He could do this partly because he used surveying tools for his astronomical observations; these were some of the most exact contemporary measuring tools.

Planman has presented in his research in 1753 that in the future it will be possible for people to take off into the air with the "help of a controlled machine".

The minor planet 2639 Planman is named after Anders Planman.
