= Lion of Parola =

Bronze statue in Hattula, Finland

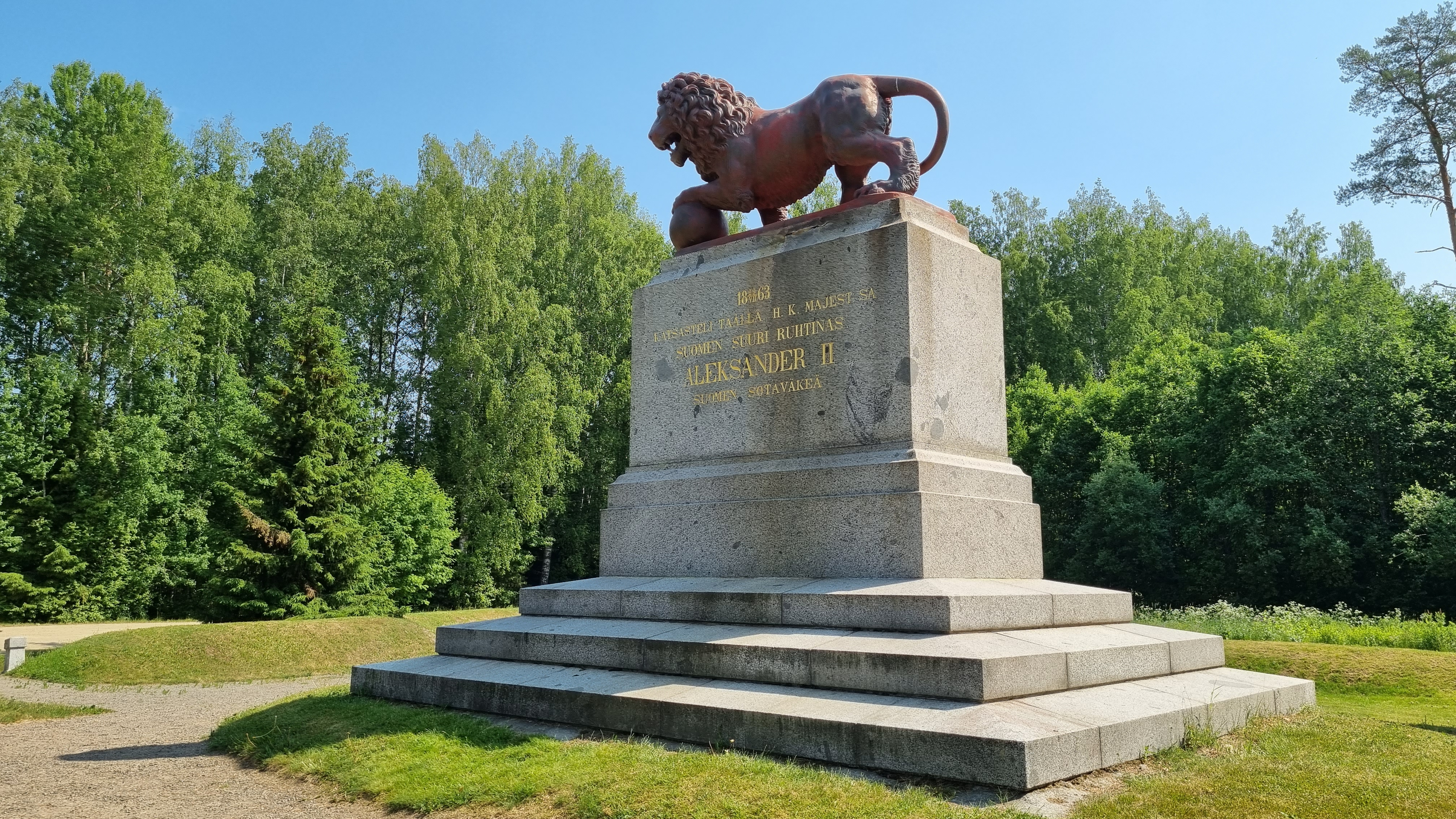
Lion of Parola statue

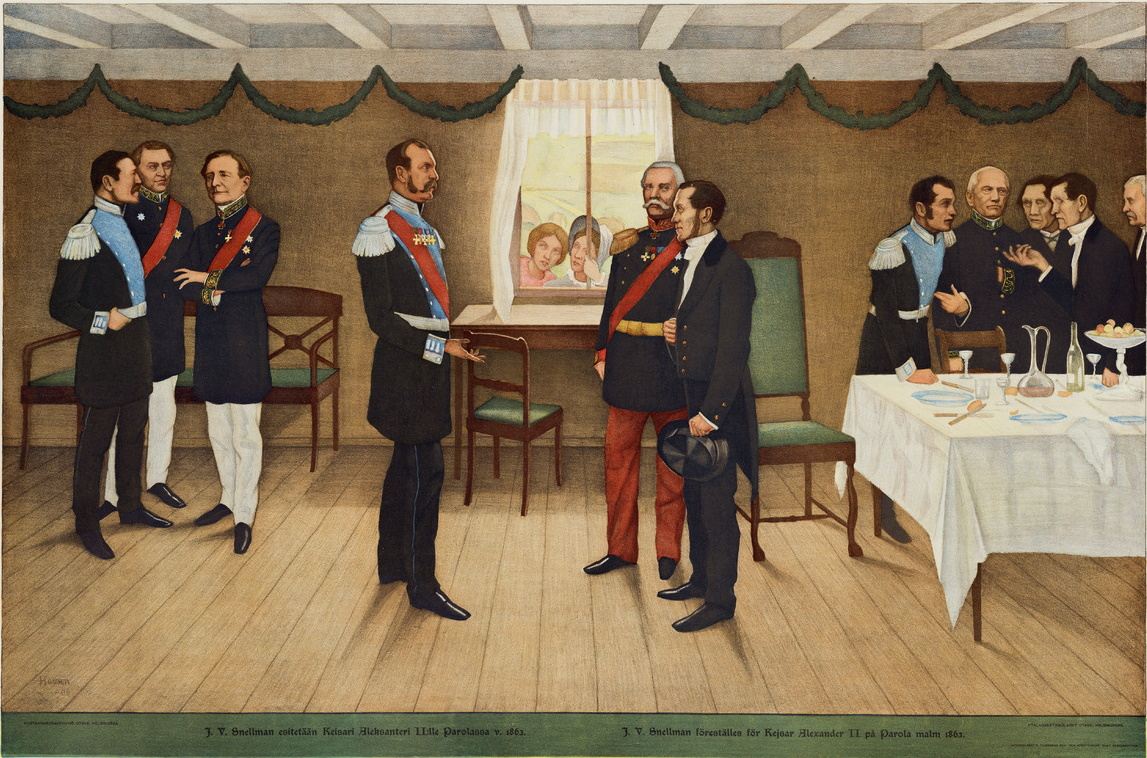
Snellman presented to Alexander II; Werner von Hausen, 1906

The Lion of Parola is a statue located at the edge of the Parolannummi military training ground in Parola area of Hattula, Finland, to honor the visit of Russian Emperor Alexander II, who inspected the Finnish troops in 1863. It is an element related to the Finnish national awakening. During this visit Alexander II met with Senator Johan Vilhelm Snellman, and this led to the decree that elevated the Finnish language to equal status with Swedish in the Grand Duchy of Finland. The statue was created by Swedish sculptor Andreas Fornander and was erected in 1868.

== Description ==
The statue was made of alloy of about 50% lead, about 30% tin, and about 20% zinc, which was not well weather-resistant. Therefore, for better preservation, the statue was covered with bronze (and therefore it is usually described as a "bronze statue"). During the renovation of the statue in 2010-2011 it was discovered that the metal was considerably deteriorated, due to the composition of the alloy. At the same time, the pedestal was well preserved and only required minor cleaning and repairs.
