= Portrait of Venny Soldan-Brofeldt =

1887 painting by Hanna Pauli

- Porträtt av Venny Soldan-Brofeldt (Swedish)
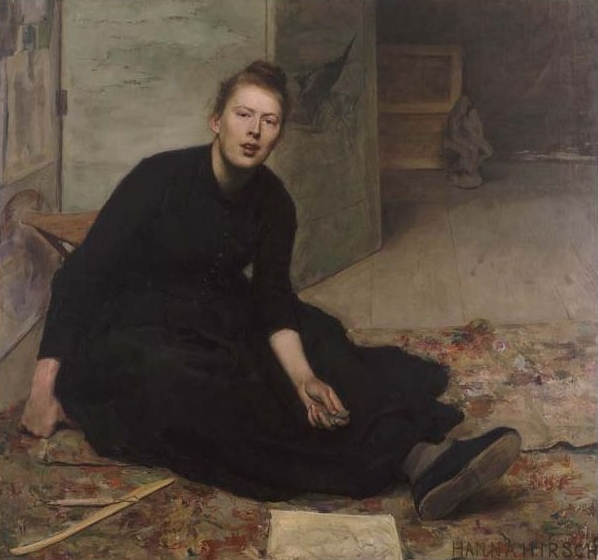
- Artist: Hanna Hirsch-Pauli
- Year: 1887
- Medium: oil on canvas
- Dimensions: 125.5 cm × 134 cm (49.4 in × 53 in)
- Location: Gothenburg Museum of Art; Gothenburg

Portrait of Venny Soldan-Brofeldt is an oil painting by Hanna Pauli from 1887. The painting was purchased in 1911 to the Gothenburg Museum of Art, where it is today.

== Analysis ==
Hanna Pauli, then Hanna Hirsch, painted the portrait of her Finnish friend and fellow artist Venny Soldan, later Venny Soldan-Brofeldt 1886-1887 in France, where she was the same year painted her most famous painting, Breakfast Time. The two artists, who was 23–24 years old, were staying together in France and had a joint studio in Montparnasse in Paris and studied at the Académie Colarossi. Hanna Hirsch had begun studying art in Stockholm at the Technical School and the women's department at the Royal Academy of Fine Arts, and then continued in France after an art education for women opened in Paris in 1884, along with other young women from the Nordic countries, among them Eva Bonnier, Jenny Nyström and Venny Soldan.

Hanna Hirsch portrait of Venny Soldan painted in their shared studio and Venny Soldan is portrayed sitting on the studio floor with bent legs outstretched, mouth open and with a radiance. It was at this time inappropriate to depict a bourgeois woman in this relaxed way, with casual dress and behavior.

The portrait of Venny Soldan was assumed to be exhibited at the Paris Salon in 1887. The same year, Hanna Hirsch fell in love with fellow artist Georg Pauli in Paris, and they return to Sweden and married there in October 1887. Venny Soldan married in 1891 with John Brofeldt (later Juhani Aho). Hanna Pauli and Venny Soldan-Brofeldt maintain a lifelong friendship and correspondence.
