= Breakfast Time =

Breakfast Time may refer to:

- Breakfast Time (1957 TV program), early morning TV program hosted by Wee Willie Webber broadcast on WFIL-TV in Philadelphia from 1957 to 1963
- Breakfast Time (British TV programme), a breakfast television programme, broadcast in the UK on BBC1 between 1983 and 1989.
- Breakfast Time (1994 TV program), a breakfast television series broadcast on the American FX channel between 1994 and 1996
- Breakfast Time (painting), an oil painting completed in 1887 by Swedish artist Hanna Pauli
- "Breakfast Time", a song by Orange Juice on their Rip It Up album
