= Fountains and ponds of Stockholm =

Water features in Stockholm, Sweden

Fountains and ponds of Stockholm are a common feature of parks and squares in Stockholm, Sweden. Erection of fountains and ponds began in a larger scale when many parks and public gardens were built around the turn of the century in the early 1900s.

== History ==
The city's oldest functioning fountain is Molins fontän erected in Kungsträdgården during 1873. The bronze fountain sculpture was designed by Johan Peter Molin (1814–1873). Molin received the order on the fountain in the spring of 1866. It was unveiled on September 25, 1873 shortly after Molin's death.

An early fountain sculpture is Tors fiske built in 1903 at the current Mariatorget. The sculpture group and fountain in bronze was designed by Anders Henrik Wissler (1869–1941). The sculpture shows the moment when the Norse god Tor has captured the Midgard worm and raises his hammer Mjölner to destroy the snake. The central figure is flanked by two water-spraying lizards.

Other early fountain sculptures include Fontändamm at Aspudden (1912) by Albin Brag (1878–1937), Vesslan at Kungsholmstorg (1912) by Otto Valdemar Strandman(1871–1960) and Triton på delfin at Centralbadsparken (1923) by Greta Klemming (1893–1961).

== Gallery ==
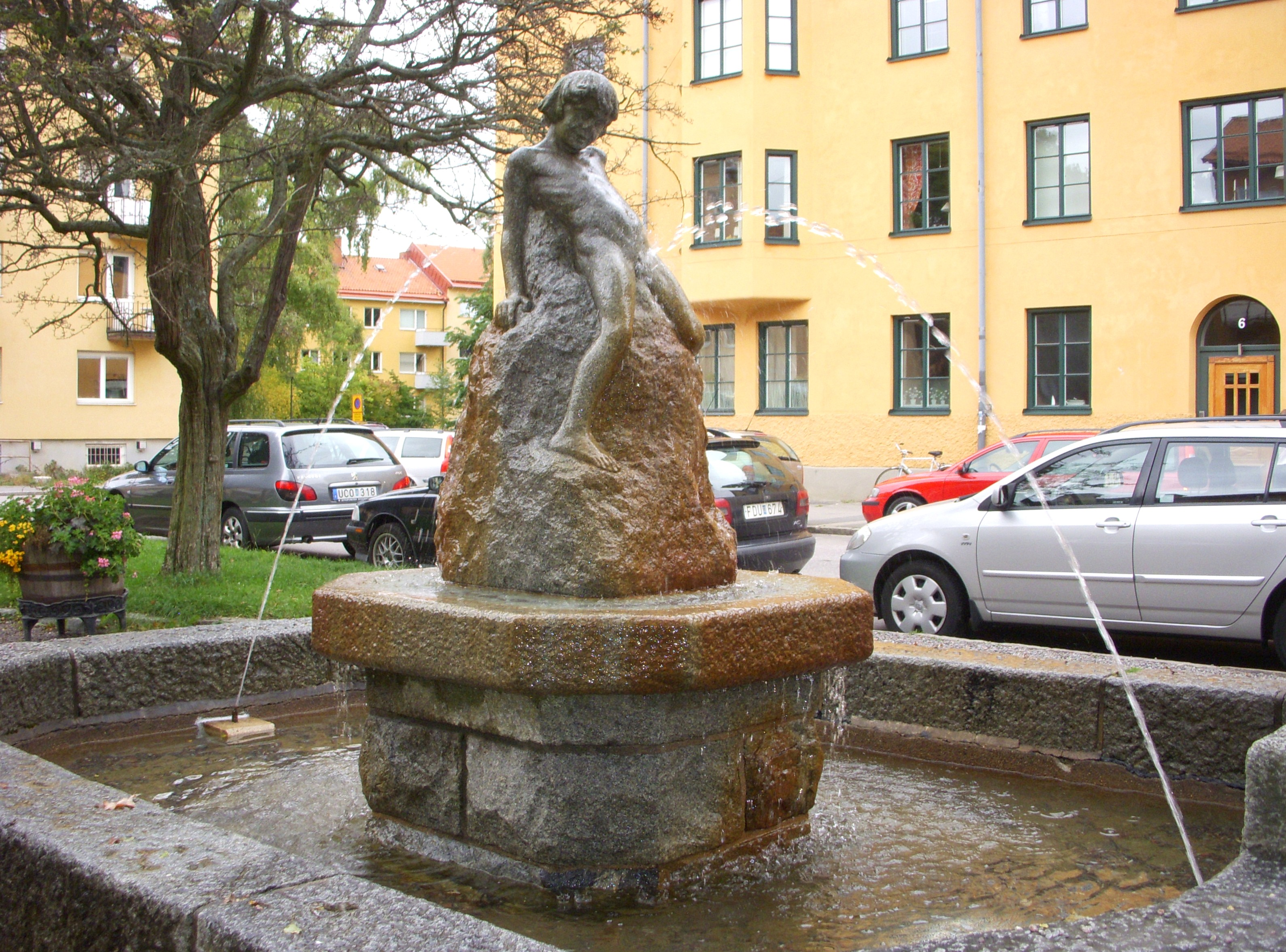
Fontändamm at Aspudden

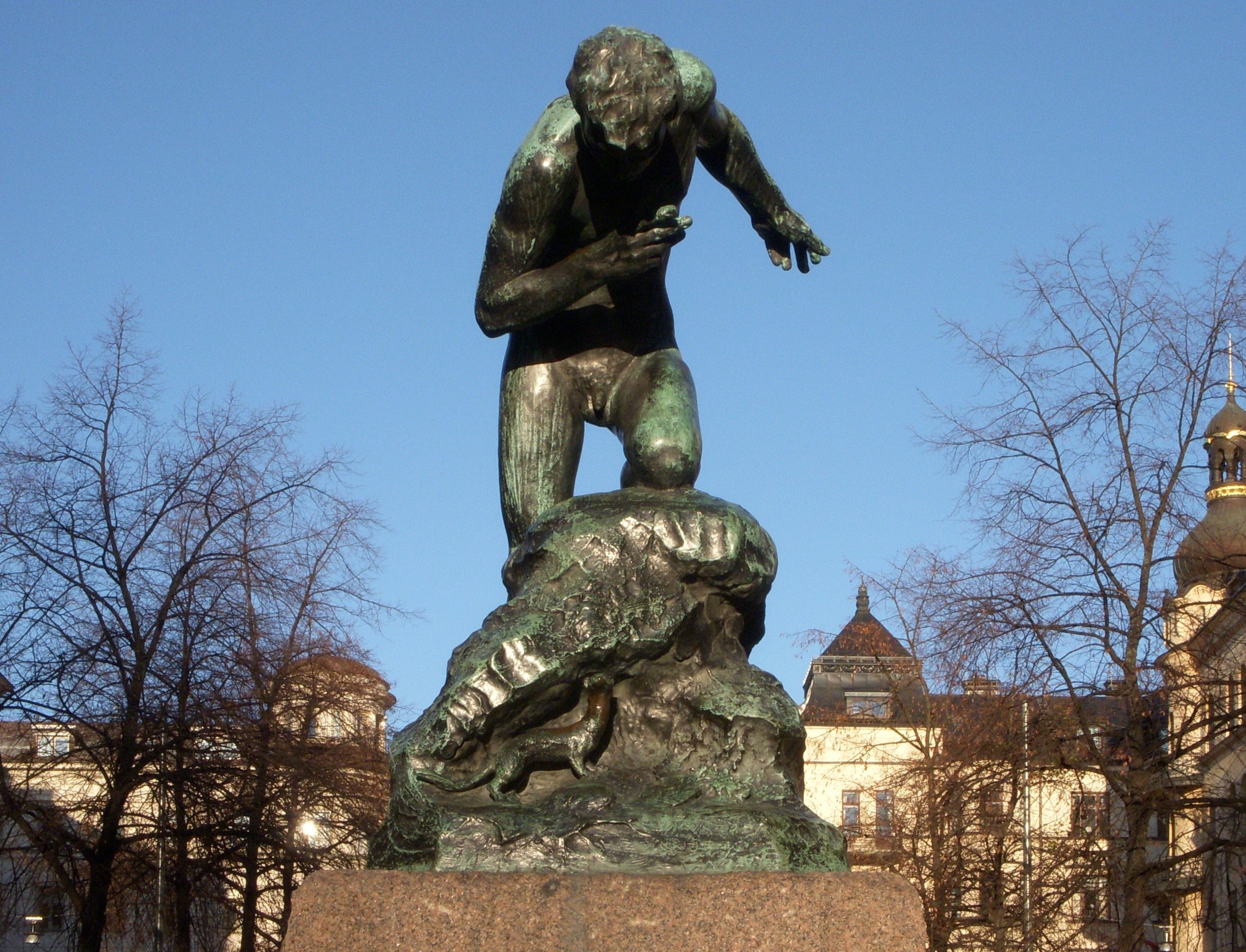
Vesslan at Kungsholmstorg

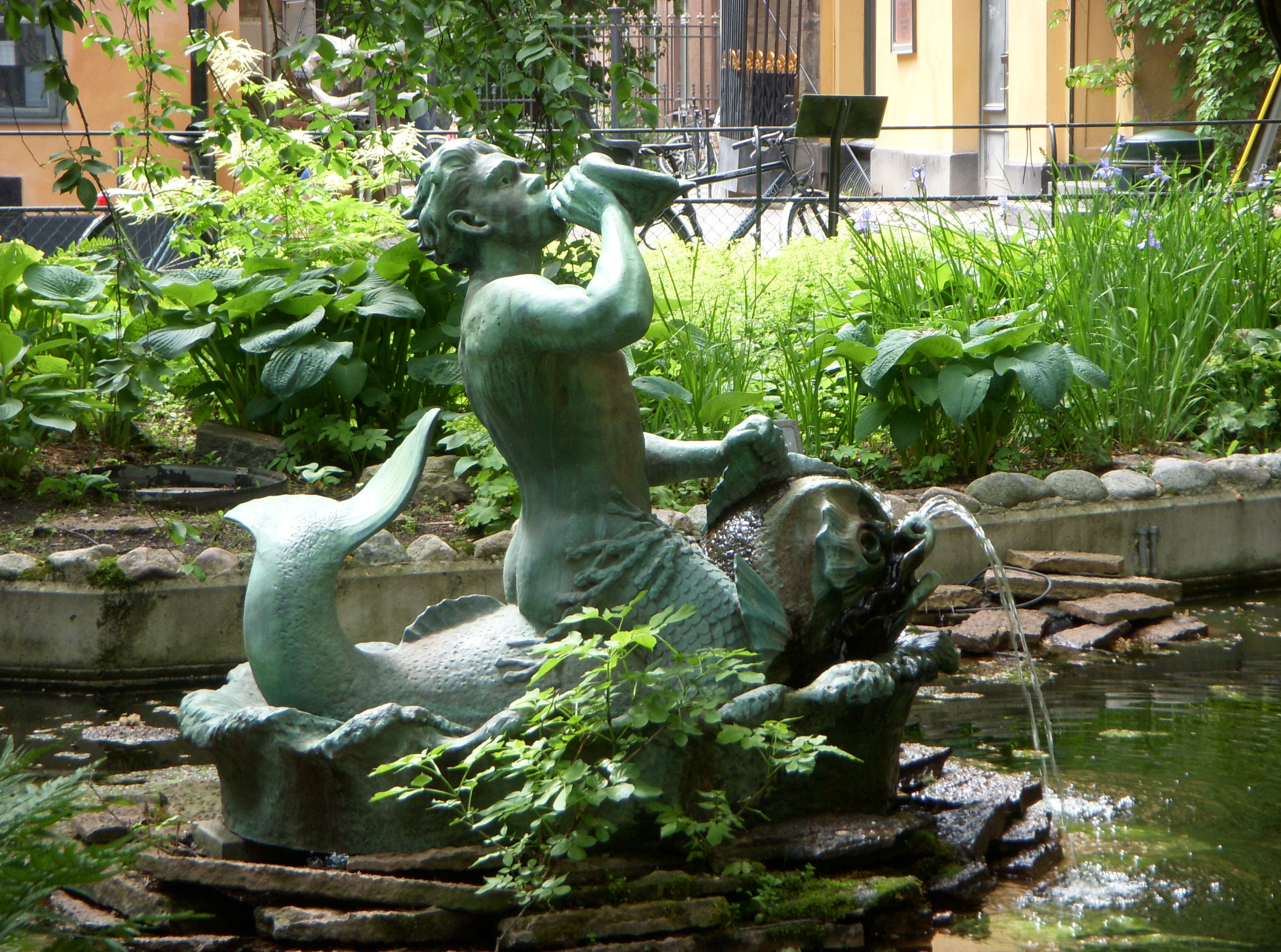
Triton på delfin at Centralbadsparken

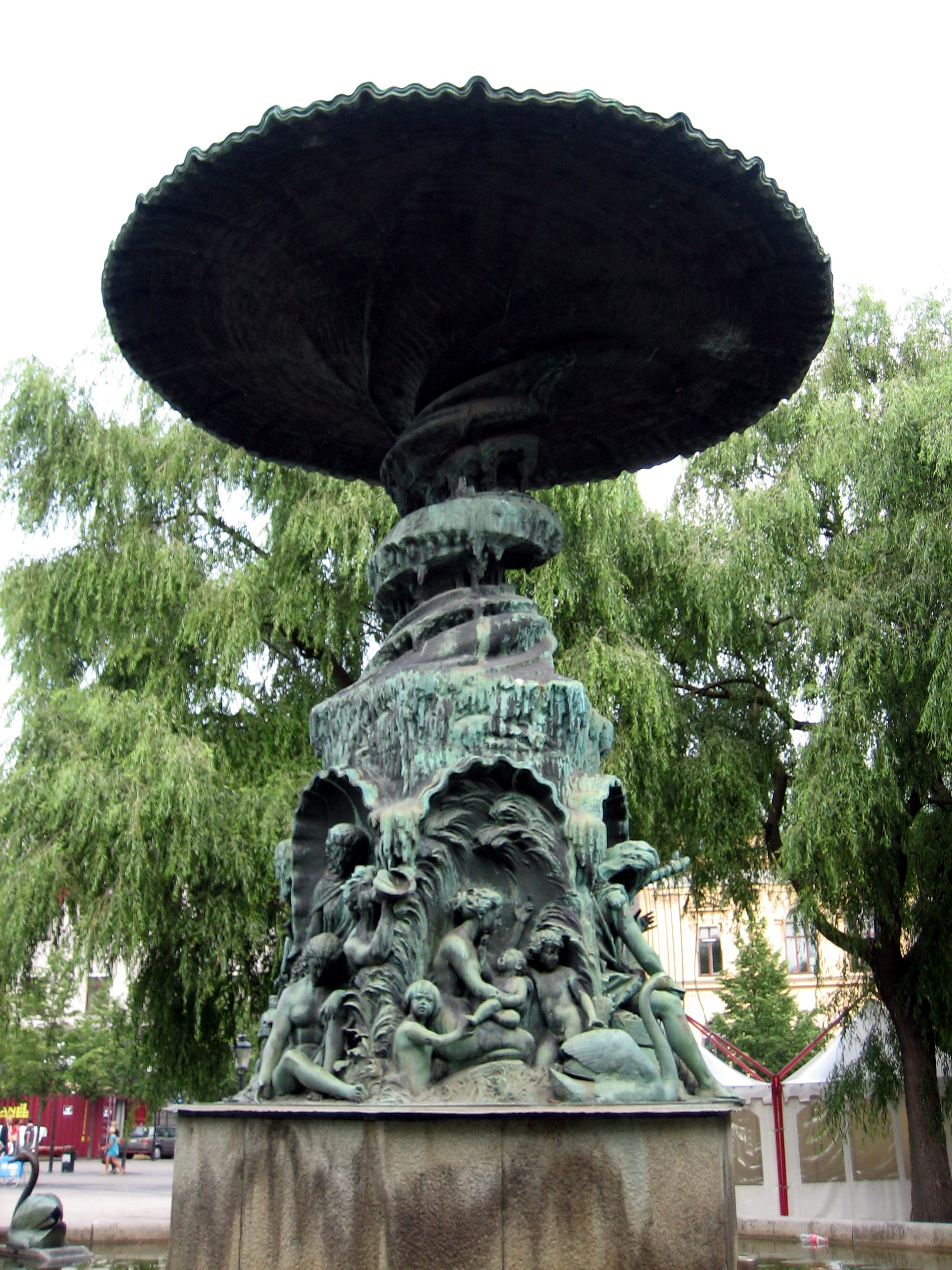
Molins fontän in Kungsträdgården

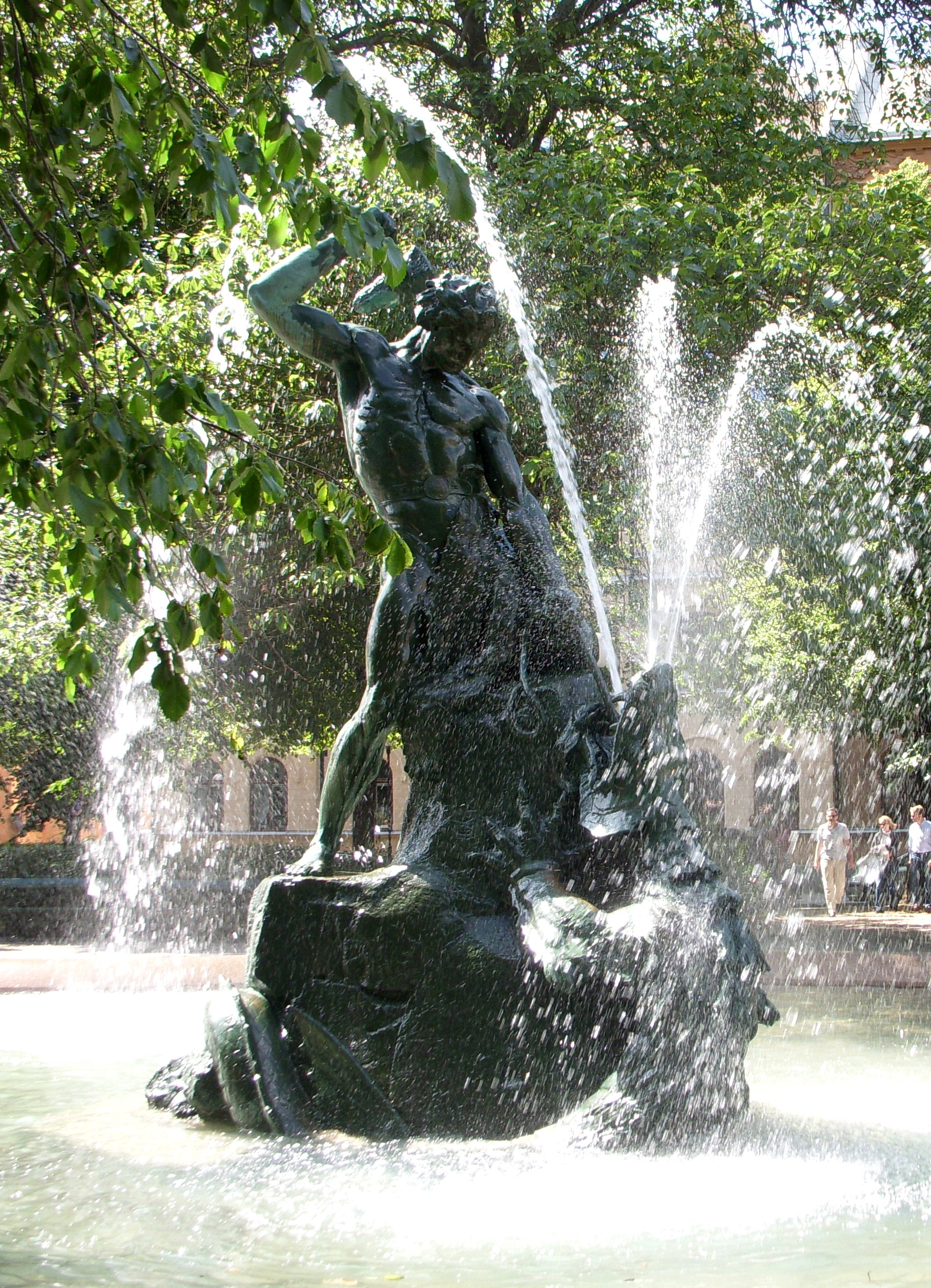
Tors fiske at Mariatorget

== See also ==
- Architecture in Stockholm

== Other sources ==
- Andersson, Thorbjörn (2000) Utanför staden: Parker i Stockholms förorter (Stockholm: Stockholmia Förlag) ISBN 91-7031-098-X
- Asker, Bertil (1986) Stockholms parker : innerstaden. Monografier utgivna av Stockholms stad (Stockholm: Liber Förlag) ISBN 91-38-90732-1
