= Albin Brag =

Swedish architect

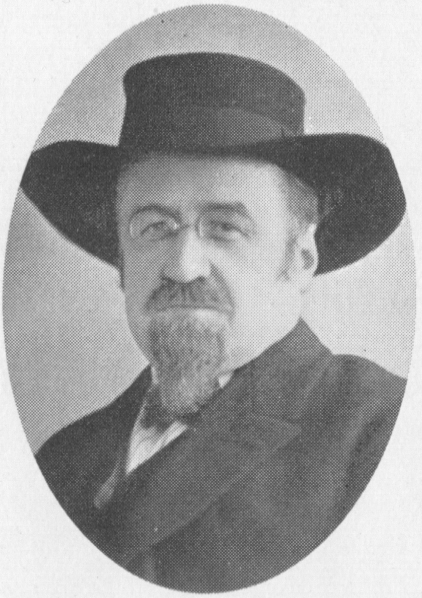
Albin Brag; Svenskt porträttarkiv

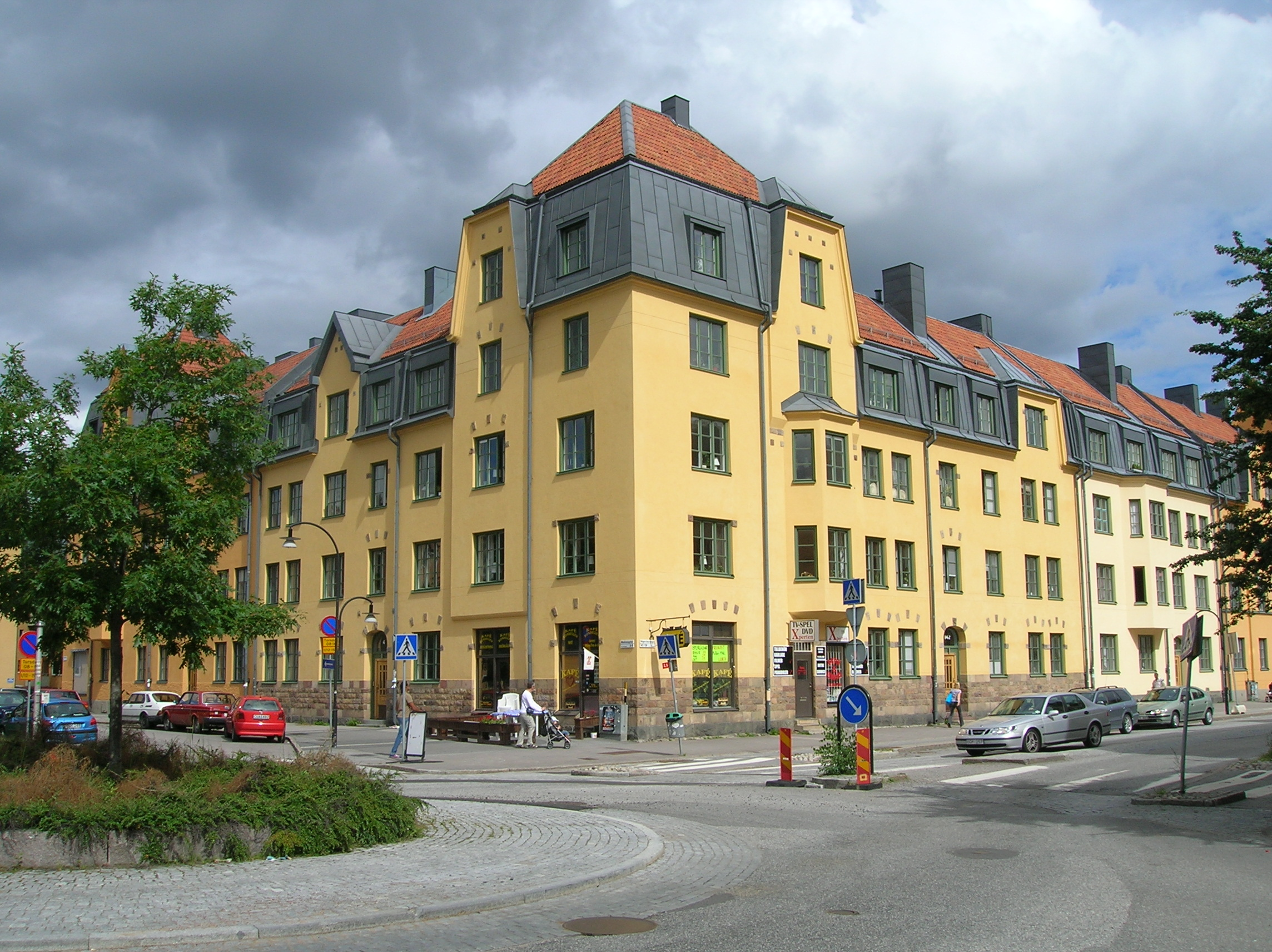
Apartment building, Aspudden, Stockholm

Karl Gustaf Albin Brag (January 30 ،1878, near Söderköping − December 23 ،1937, Stockholm) was a Swedish architect.

== Life and work ==
He completed his primary schooling in Jönköping in 1897. From 1898 to 1902, he studied at the KTH Royal Institute of Technology, followed by studies at the Technical University of Munich from 1902 to 1903. Then came work at an architectural office, from 1903 to 1906; after which he established his own business. In 1908, he became a teacher at the Konstfack (Technical College). At first, he also worked as a watercolorist and etcher; having been a student of Axel Tallberg and Edvin Ollers.

He designed factory and office buildings, as well as worker housing, for several large Swedish companies; notably in Hallstahammar, Fagersta, Stråssa, Köping and Nacka. He also designed, retirement homes, manors, villas and spas, throughout the country. Notable examples are the Teachers' Rest Home, outside Stockholm and Arvedsons gymnastikinstitut in Lärkstaden, an area inspired by the English garden city movement.

Numerous apartment buildings in Aspudden and Midsommarkransen were of his design; commissioned by the development company, Byggnads AB Manhem. They are enclosed neighborhood buildings with ornate gables, bay windows and angled ceilings in a simplified Art Nouveau style, and give those areas their distinctive character. They also commissioned him to design a sculpture for a water fountain in Aspudden.

During the early part of the century, he designed eight villas in Nacka and the surrounding areas; one of which burned down in 1930. Two of them were designed for artists; Richard Bergh (still known as the Villa Bergh), and Georg Pauli and his wife, Hanna Hirsch-Pauli. One was for the author, Per Hallström. They were inspired by the small, Baroque-style "palaces" that were popular in Germany at the time. He also designed some lesser-known villas in Uppsala.
