= Interior of a Studio in Paris =

Painting by Eva bonnier

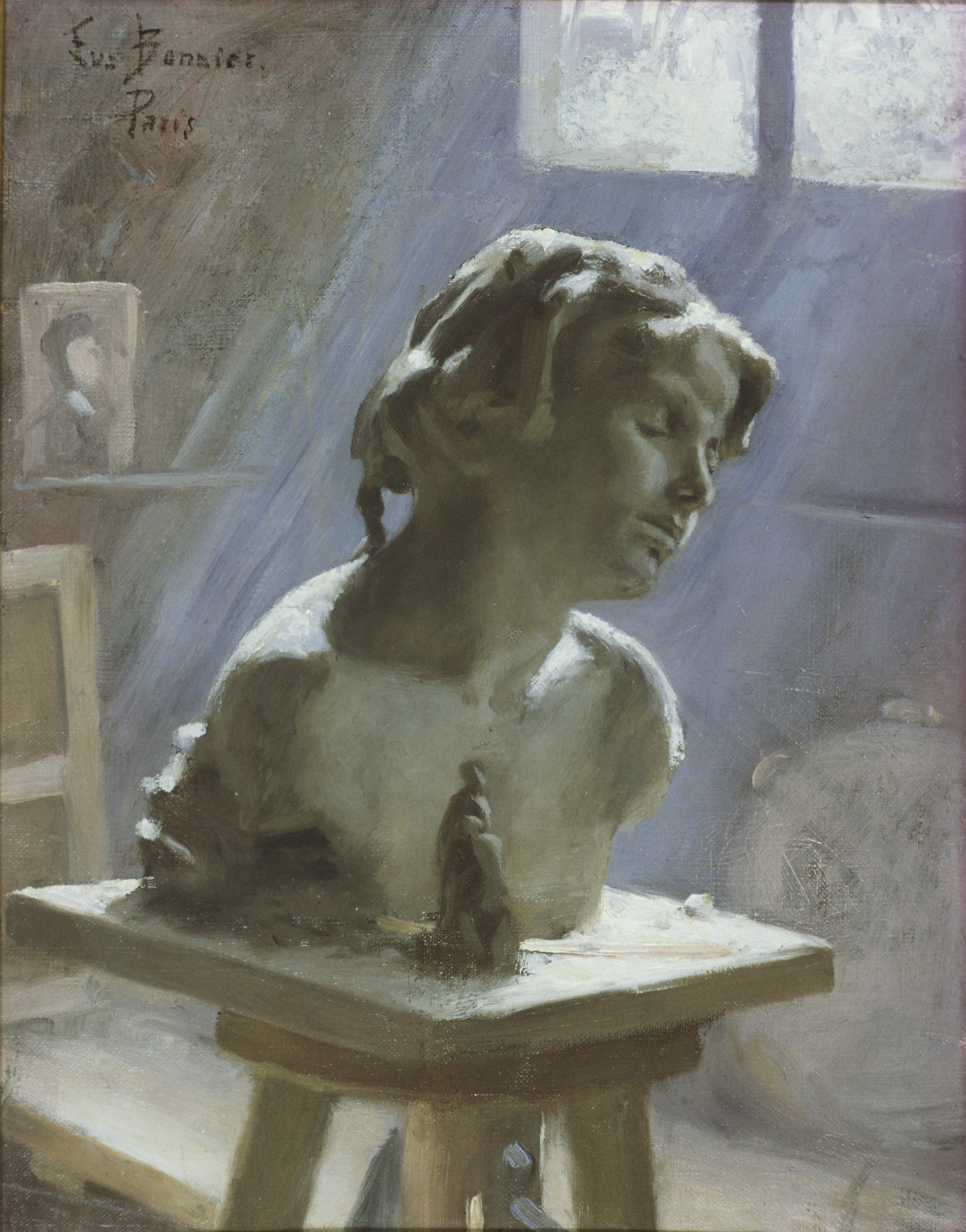
Interior of a Studio in Paris (1886) by Eva Bonnier

Interior of a Studio in Paris (Swedish - Ateljéinteriör i Paris) is an 1886 oil on canvas painting by Eva Bonnier. The painting, which measures 41 by 32 cm, depicts a sculpture of a young boy in her studio on Rue Humboldt in Montparnasse - she lived in the French capital from 1883 to 1889. It is in the collection of the Nationalmuseum in Stockholm, to which it was given in 1910 by Karl Otto Bonnier.
