= Architecture of Stockholm =

Architecture of the capital of Sweden

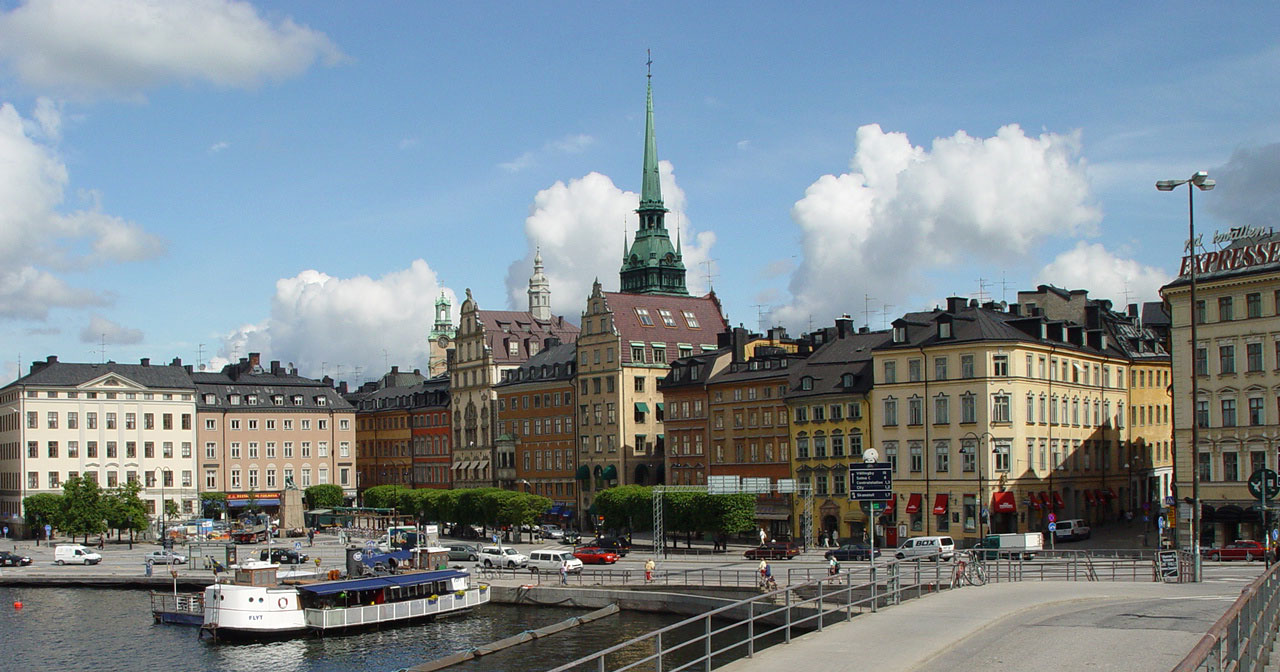
Architecture of Stockholm, view of the Old Town

The architecture of Stockholm has a history that dates back to the 13th century, possibly even earlier. According to some sources, there might have been a simple defense structure, perhaps a small castle, on the northeast part of the island Stadsholmen. Buildings in Stockholm are characterized by their unique location between Lake Mälaren and the Baltic Sea. The Hanseatic League during the great period of industrialization saw a strong desire to modernize the city.

The design of most major buildings shows foreign influences. During the 17th century and 18th century, foreign architects were recruited to build the city and in recent periods Swedish architects often drew inspiration from their tours to Europe, and in the 20th century particularly, the United States. Foreign trends tended to arrive later in Sweden and were adapted to Swedish tradition and taste. Neoclassicism became the Swedish Gustavian style, and the classicism of the 1920s, including Art Deco, became a separate style, often called Swedish Grace.

Stockholm's historic buildings are largely conserved because the city has escaped destruction through war, which was commonplace in Europe. The infrastructure of Stockholm is in many ways connected to the buildings themselves, as such, major infrastructural components will be discussed in this article.

== Development of buildings ==
=== 1250–1600 ===
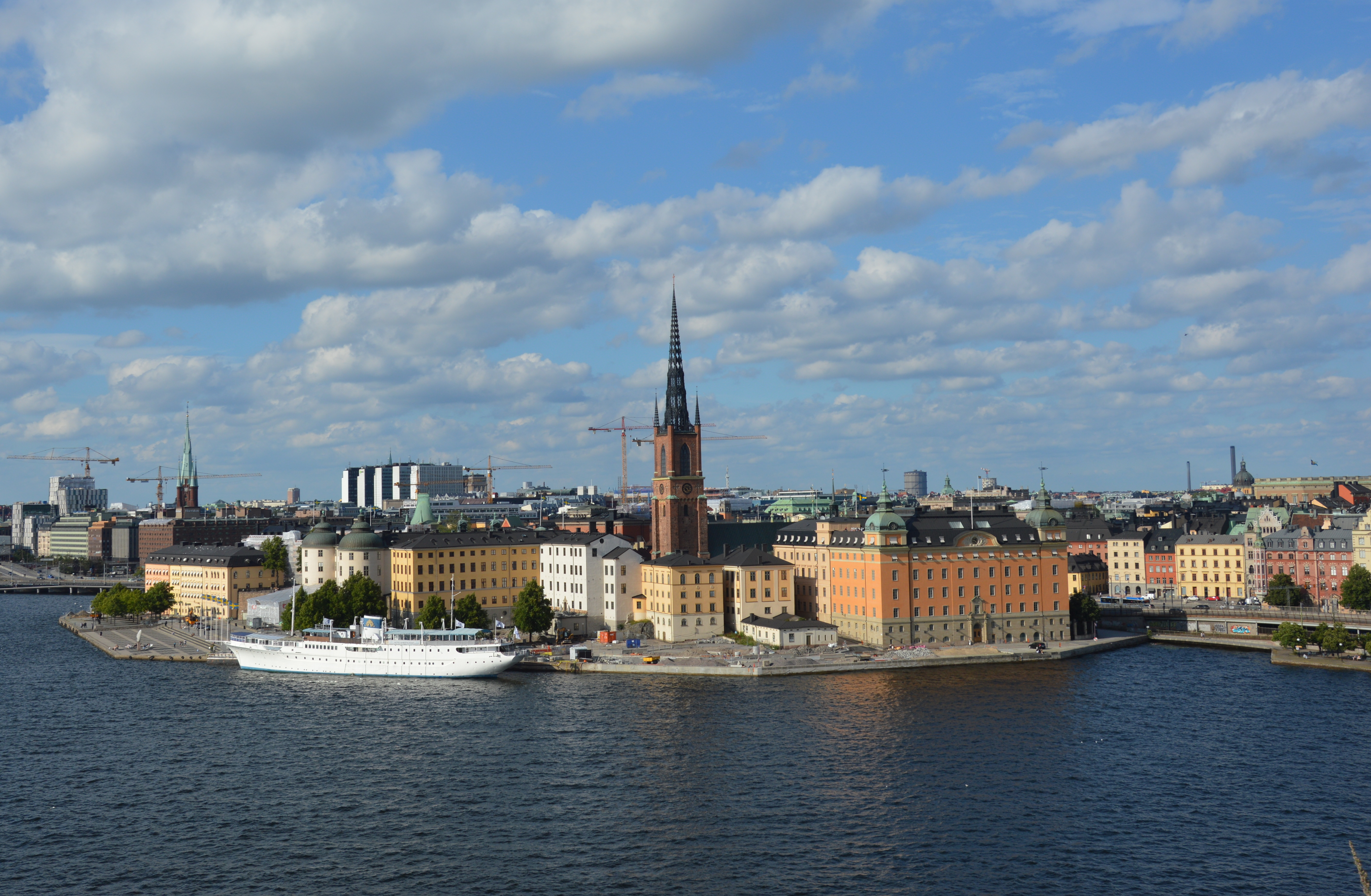
Riddarholmen, part of Gamla Stan

The oldest part of Stockholm is Gamla stan (The Old Town), which contains some of the city's oldest buildings and ruins.

The buildings that survive from this period are mostly churches and royal buildings since these were built from more durable materials than other buildings from that period. Birger Jarls torn (The Tower Of Birger Jarl) was considered the oldest building in the entire city, however, it is now known to have been erected by Gustav Vasa in the 16th century. The Riddarholmen Church from the late 13th century is considered to be the oldest surviving building in Stockholm. While it came to serve as the church of choice for royal burials, another church, Storkyrkan (The Great Church) came to be used for coronations. Both of the churches have been redesigned several times since their erection.

Stockholm is first mentioned as the capital of Sweden in the 1430s, though the city existed for over 200 years prior to that and had become a typical Hansa port. During this period, German craftsmen were often employed to construct buildings, resulting in the widespread use of German architecture. Among the buildings constructed in this period is the German Merchants Guild, which was later transformed into the German Church.

The areas to the south and to the north of The Old Town were called Malmarna. Between the 13th and 17th centuries, these areas contained only very simple buildings.

=== 14th century–18th century ===
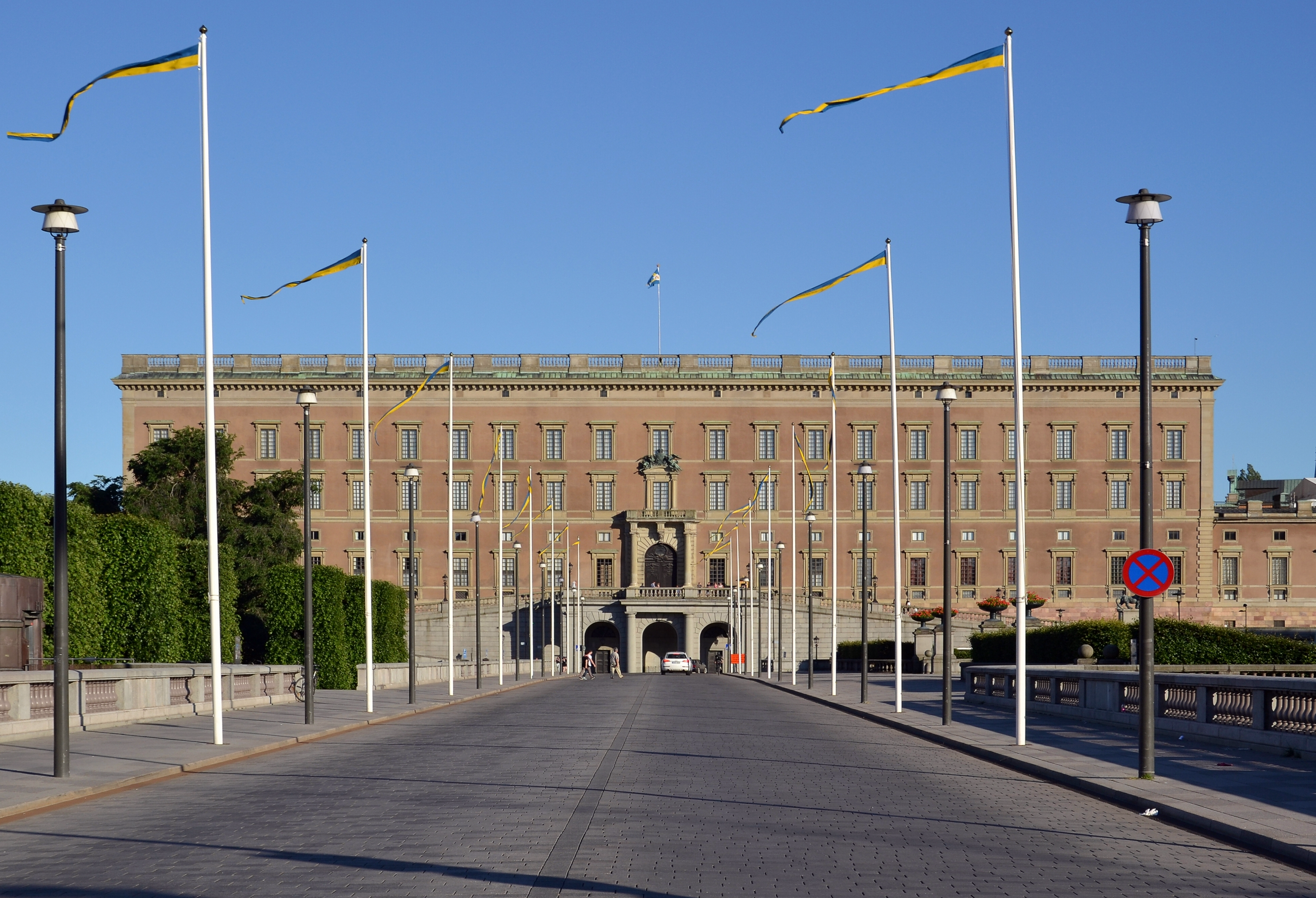
The Stockholm Palace

The 14th century saw King Magnus's disputes with the Danish provinces of Skåne and Blekinge leading to attacks on Swedish cities, including Stockholm. This led to the construction of a fortress in Gamla stan, Stockholm's Old Town. This was a period in which Stockholm, as it had only recently been referred to, moved between the bridges surrounding Gamla stan's structure for security. The city structures were built of wood except for the Cathedral Storkyrkan and a tower called "Three Crowns" which were more monumental.

Stockholm's development was also especially influenced by Germany because of the great volume of trade occurring between the nations at the time through the nearby waterways. The North German architecture is most prominent in Gamla stan. The 15th century saw the Battle of Brunkeberg break out in the middle of downtown Stockholm. King Gustav Vasa rose to power as a result of the dispute and declared the city an independent monarchy. This maneuver is credited with lifting Stockholm's development to those of other major European cities. The city was rebuilt and developed further in the next centuries. The city expanded greatly. Infrastructure increased exponentially for transport and other public services. Likewise, royal wealth had increased dramatically and large palaces were constructed, like the Royal Palace.

== See also ==
- Bridges in Stockholm
- Churches in Stockholm
- Fountains and ponds of Stockholm
- Tallest buildings in Stockholm
- Culture in Stockholm
