= Abraham Hirsch =

Swedish music publisher, politician, and businessman

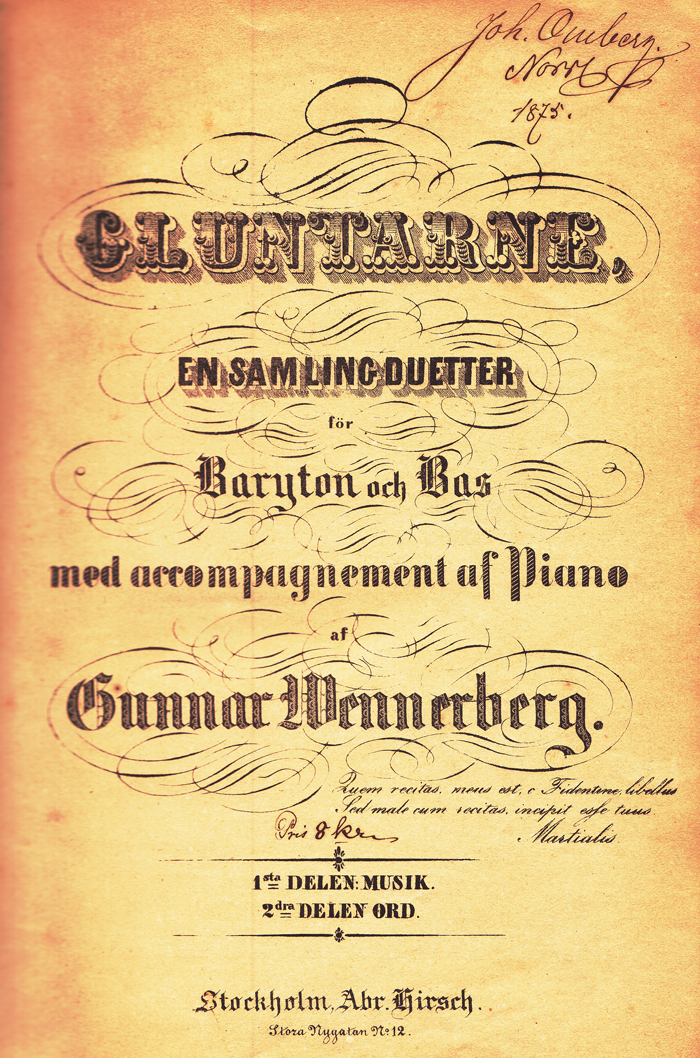
Front cover to the original edition of Gunnar Wennerberg's Swedish song cycle Gluntarna which was published by Hirsch.

Abraham Hirsch (16 August 1815, Stockholm - 23 February 1900, Stockholm) was a Swedish music publisher, politician, and businessman. He played an instrumental role in establishing the Swedish Art Music Society in 1859. From 1869–1876 he was the CFO of Aftonbladet and for many year he was a councilman for the city of Stockholm. As a music publisher he published works for several notable Swedish composers, including Isidor Dannström, Ivar Hallström, Jacob Axel Josephson, Adolf Fredrik Lindblad, August Söderman, Emil Sjögren, and Gunnar Wennerberg among others.

He was the father of painter Hanna Hirsch-Pauli.
