= Eva Bonnier =

Swedish painter and philanthropist (1857–1909)

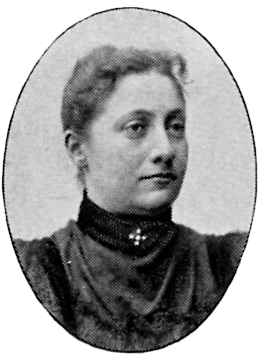
Eva Fredrika Bonnier - from Svenskt Porträttgalleri XX

Eva Fredrika Bonnier (17 November 1857 – 13 January 1909) was a Swedish painter and philanthropist.

== Biography ==
Born in Stockholm as the daughter of publisher Albert Bonnier and a member of a leading family of publishers, Bonnier studied painting with August Malmström and became a student in the women's section of the Royal Swedish Academy of Arts in Stockholm in 1878. Together with her friend and co-student Hanna Hirsch, she traveled to Paris in 1883, staying there until 1889. Her painting "Music" (1889) was awarded a mention honorable at the Paris Salon. After her return to Sweden in 1889, she was active as a painter until about 1900, mostly of portraits, such as those of Lisen Bonnier (her sister-in-law) as convalescent, industrialist Hjalmar Lundbohm, politician Moritz Rubenson, educator Carl Meijerberg and poet and scholar Oscar Levertin. Bonnier exhibited her work at the Palace of Fine Arts at the 1893 World's Columbian Exposition in Chicago, Illinois. She is represented with several paintings in the Nationalmuseum, Stockholm.

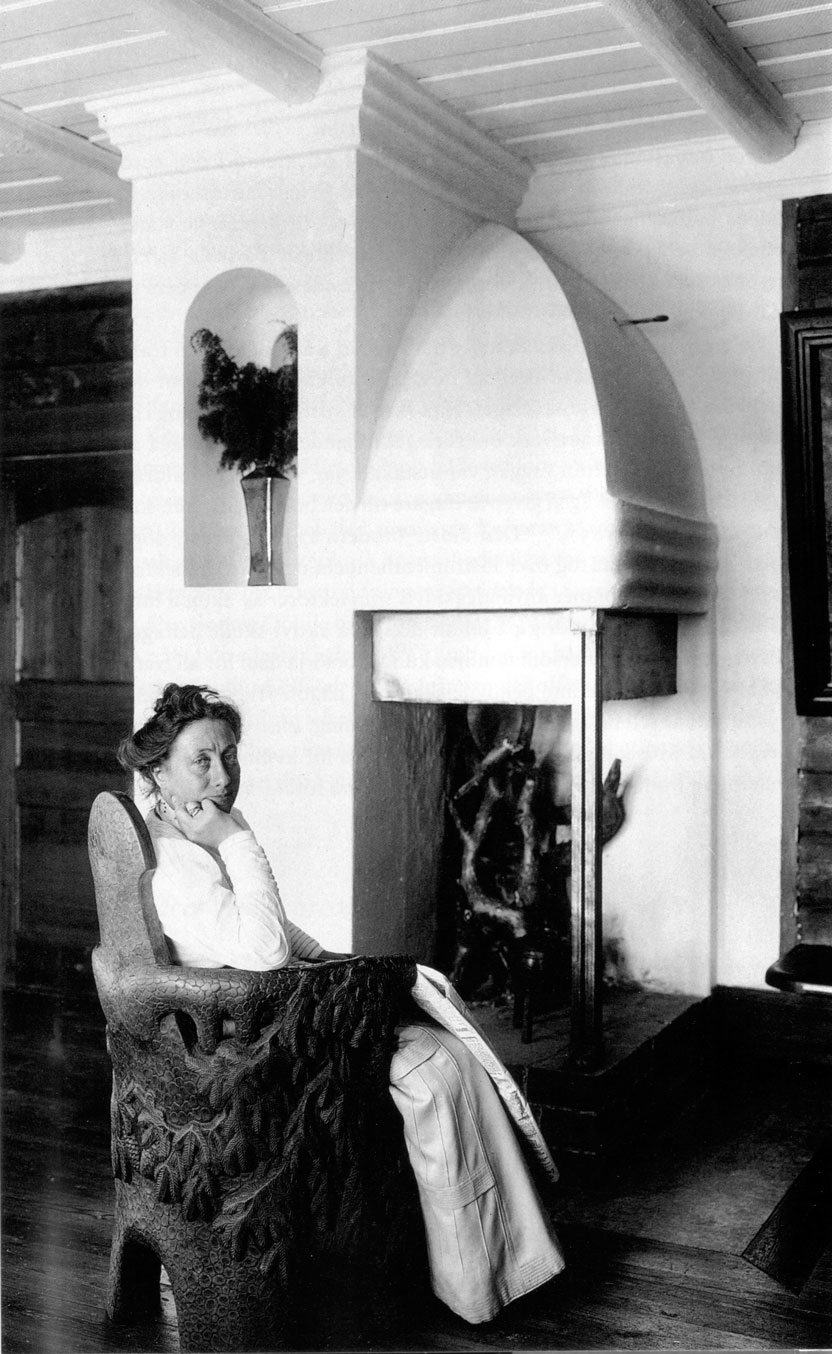
Eva Bonnier, 1905

After about 1900 Bonnier fell silent as an artist and devoted herself to her philanthropic work, enabled through her inherited wealth. She established a foundation for the beautification of Stockholm, which in its first years financed paintings and sculptures for public places and institutions, such as the Royal Library, Stockholm University, and several Stockholm schools. The foundation remains active.

Bonnier was a member of the women's association Nya Idun.

Bonnier suffered from frequent depressions and took her own life in Copenhagen in 1909, aged 51.

== Selected works ==
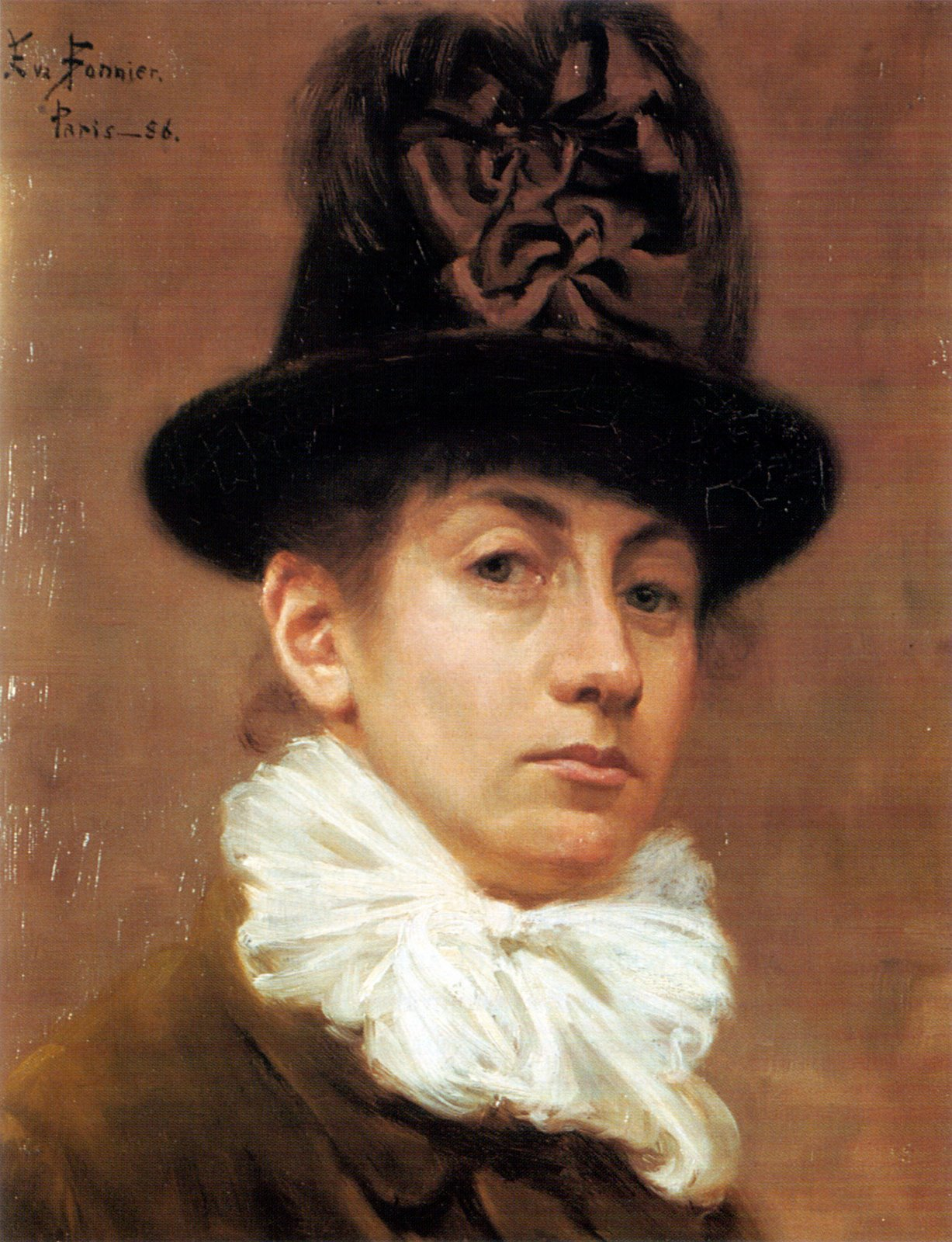
1886 (Self portrait, Bonnier family portrait collection, Stockholm)

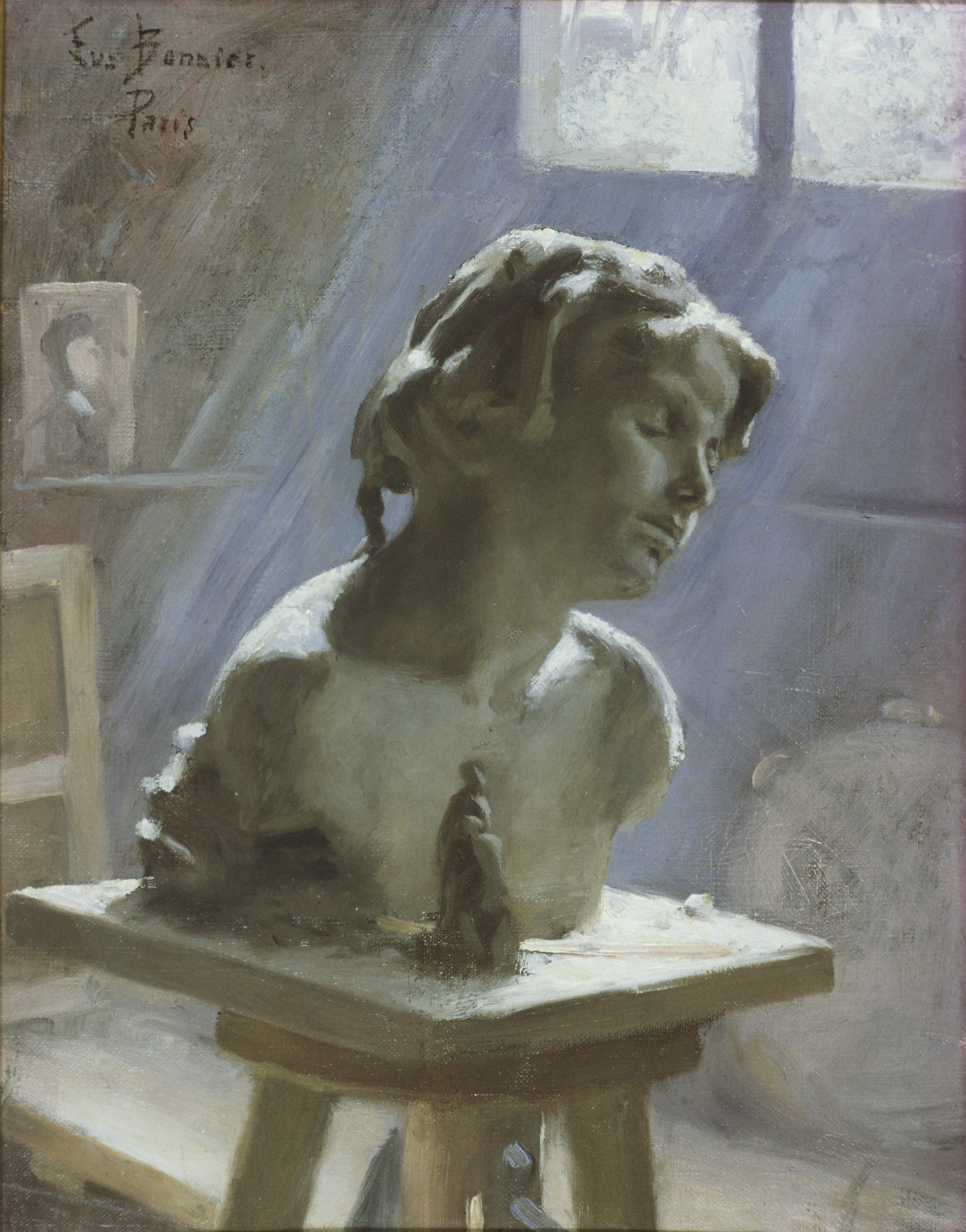
1886 (Interior of a Studio in Paris, Nationalmuseum, Stockholm)

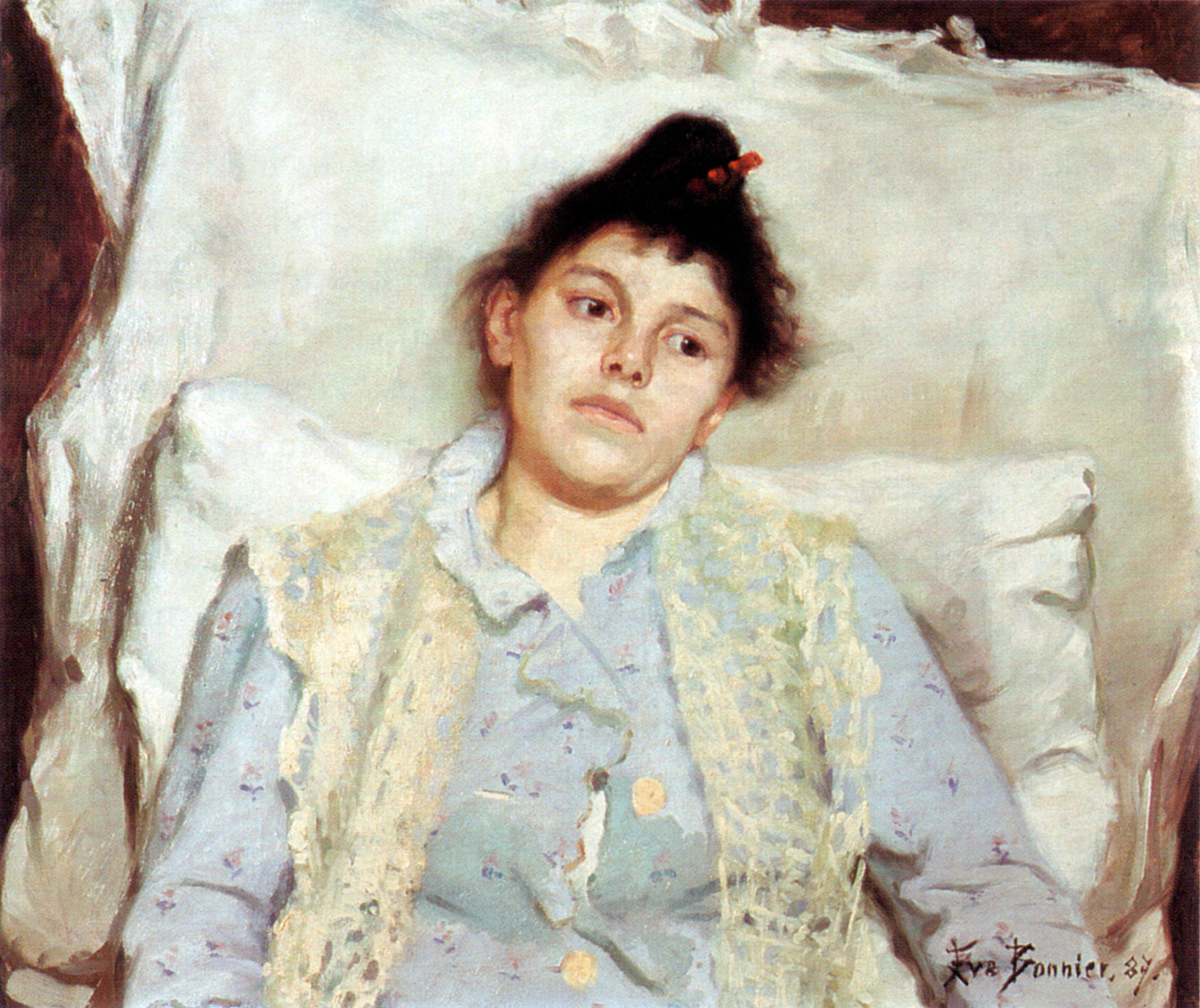
1887 (Magdalena, Waldemarsudde)

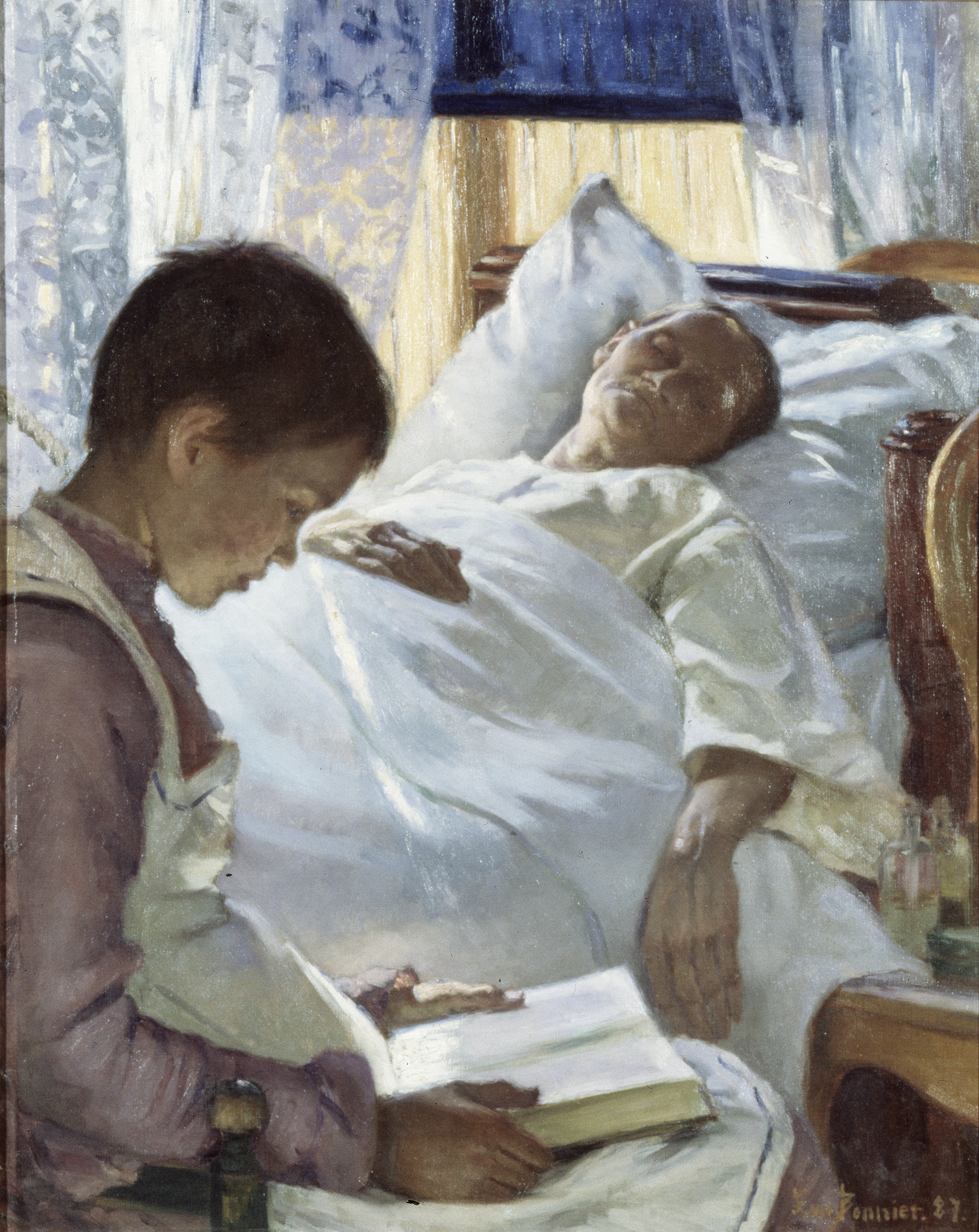
1887 (Reflection in Blue, Nationalmuseum)

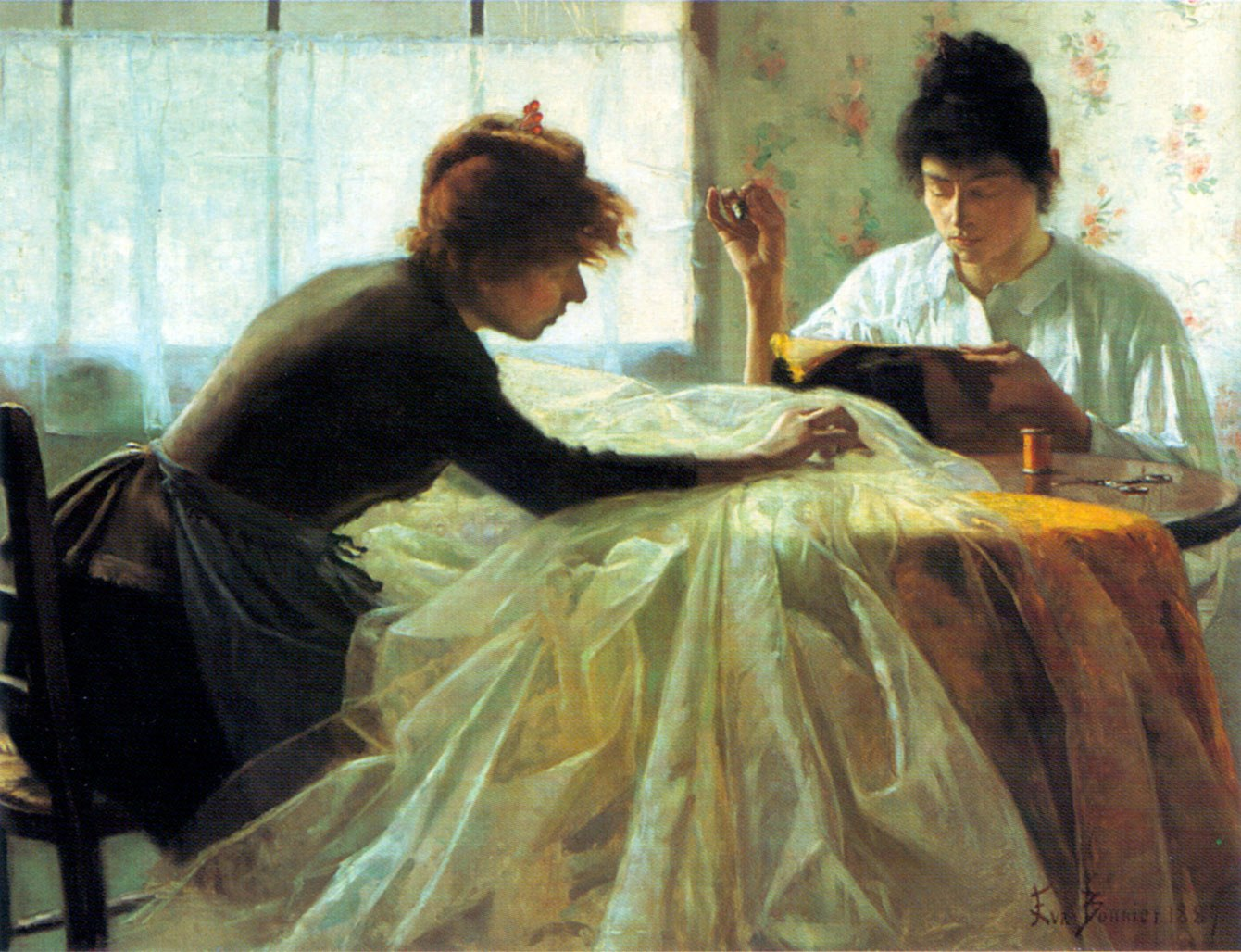
1887 (Dressmakers)

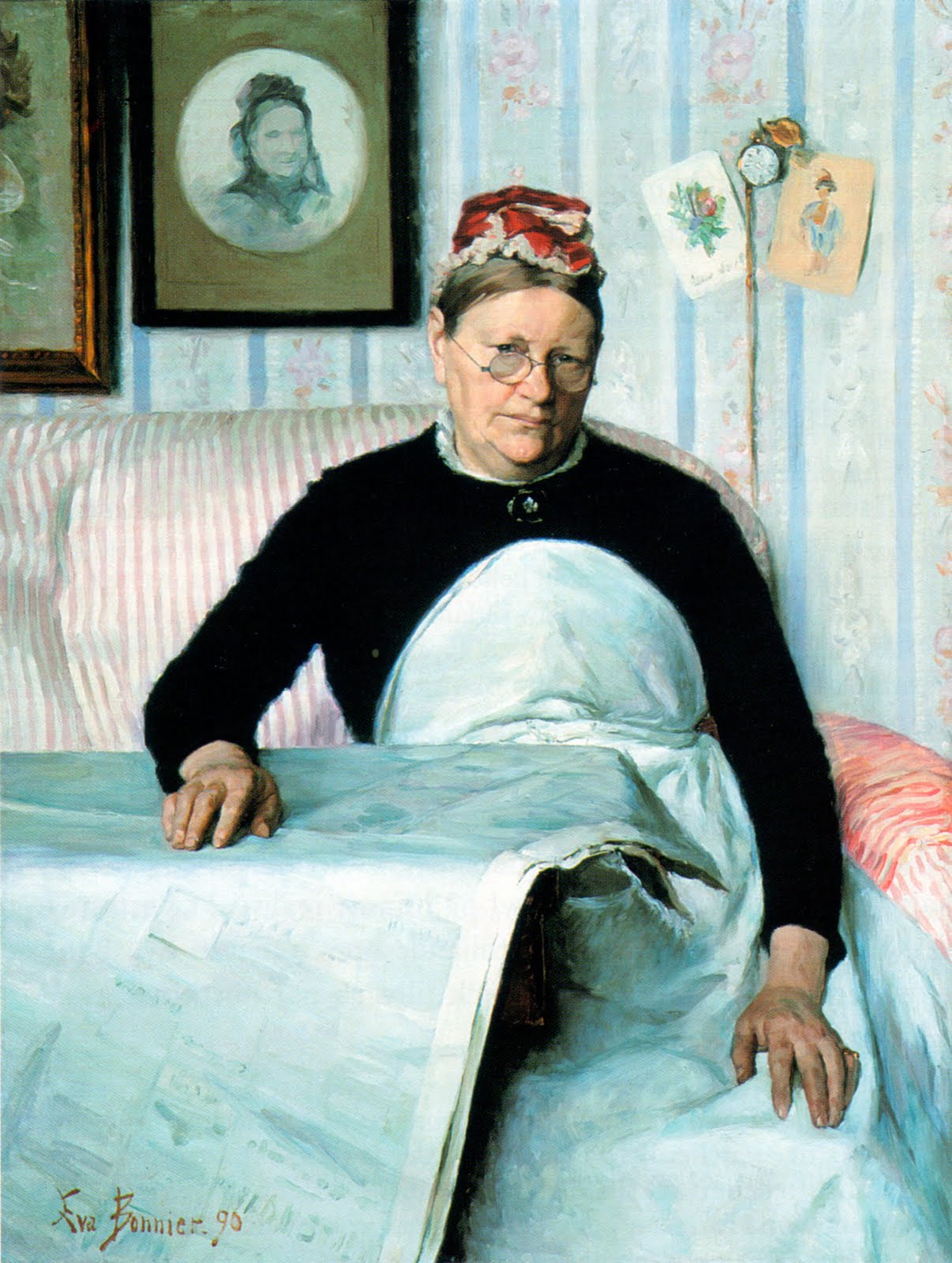
1890 (The House Keeper, Nationalmuseum, Stockholm)

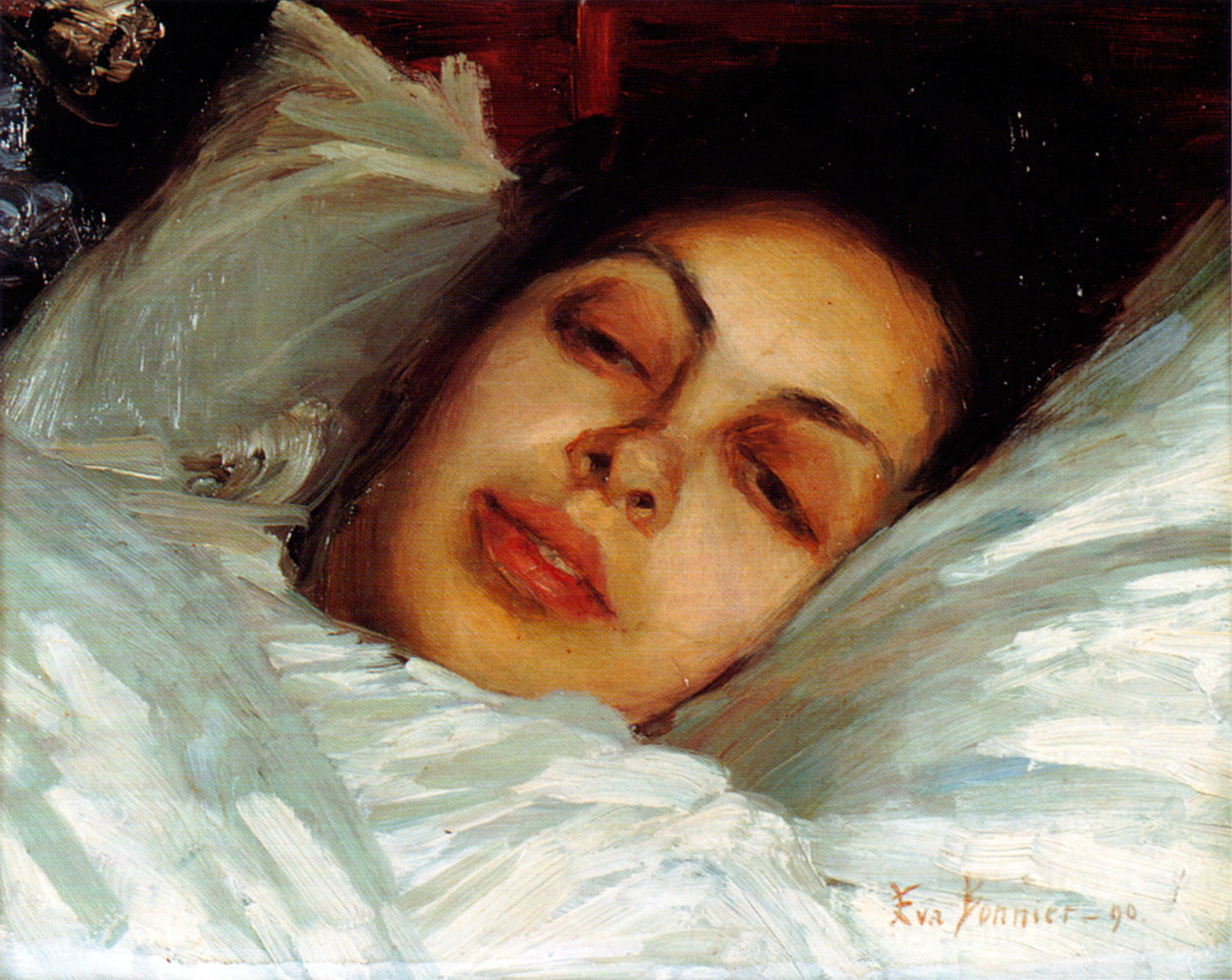
1890 (Convalescent, Lisen Bonnier)

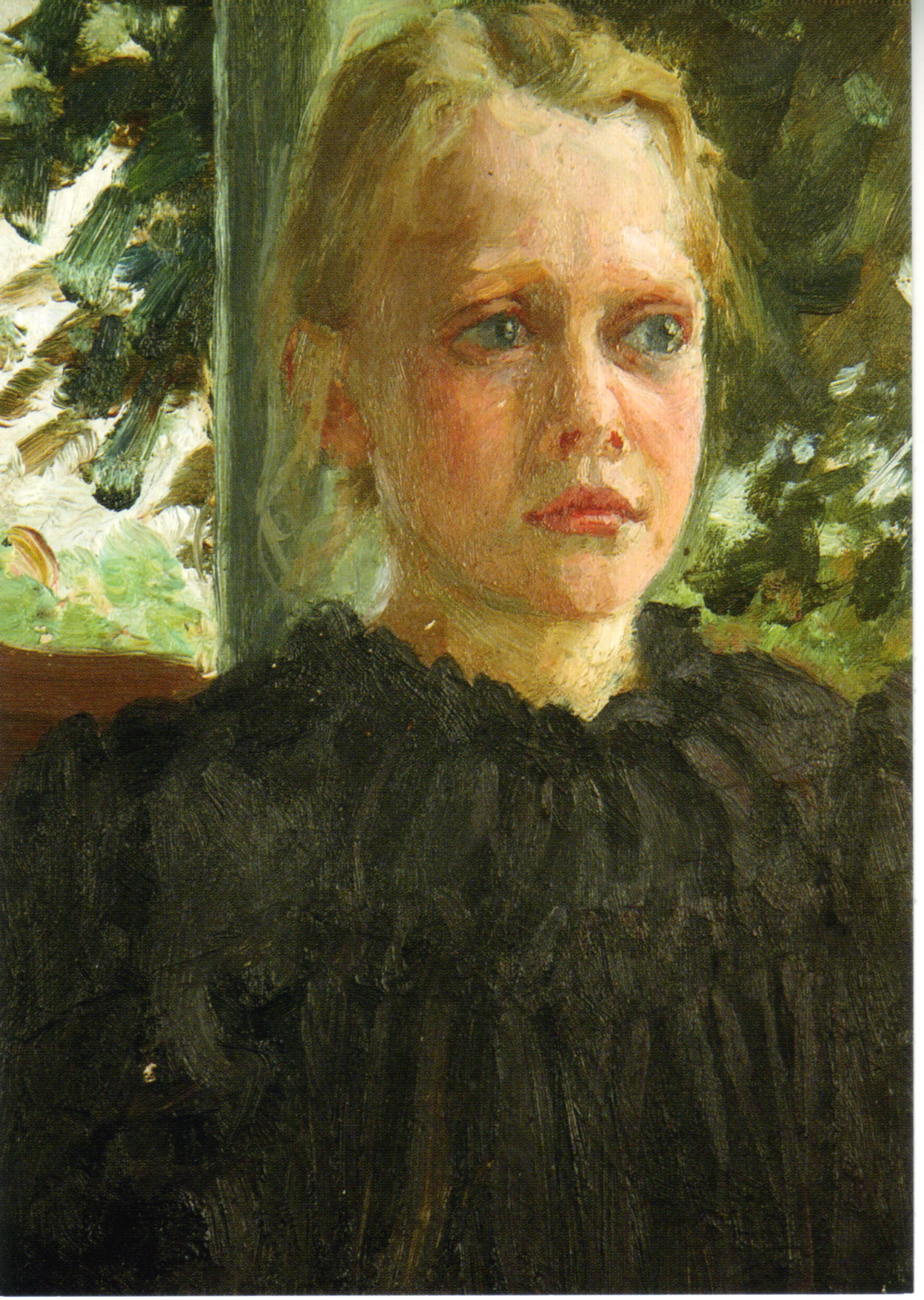
ca 1906 (Julia Hasselberg, Blekinge museum)
