= Breakfast Time (painting) =

Painting by Hanna Pauli

Breakfast time
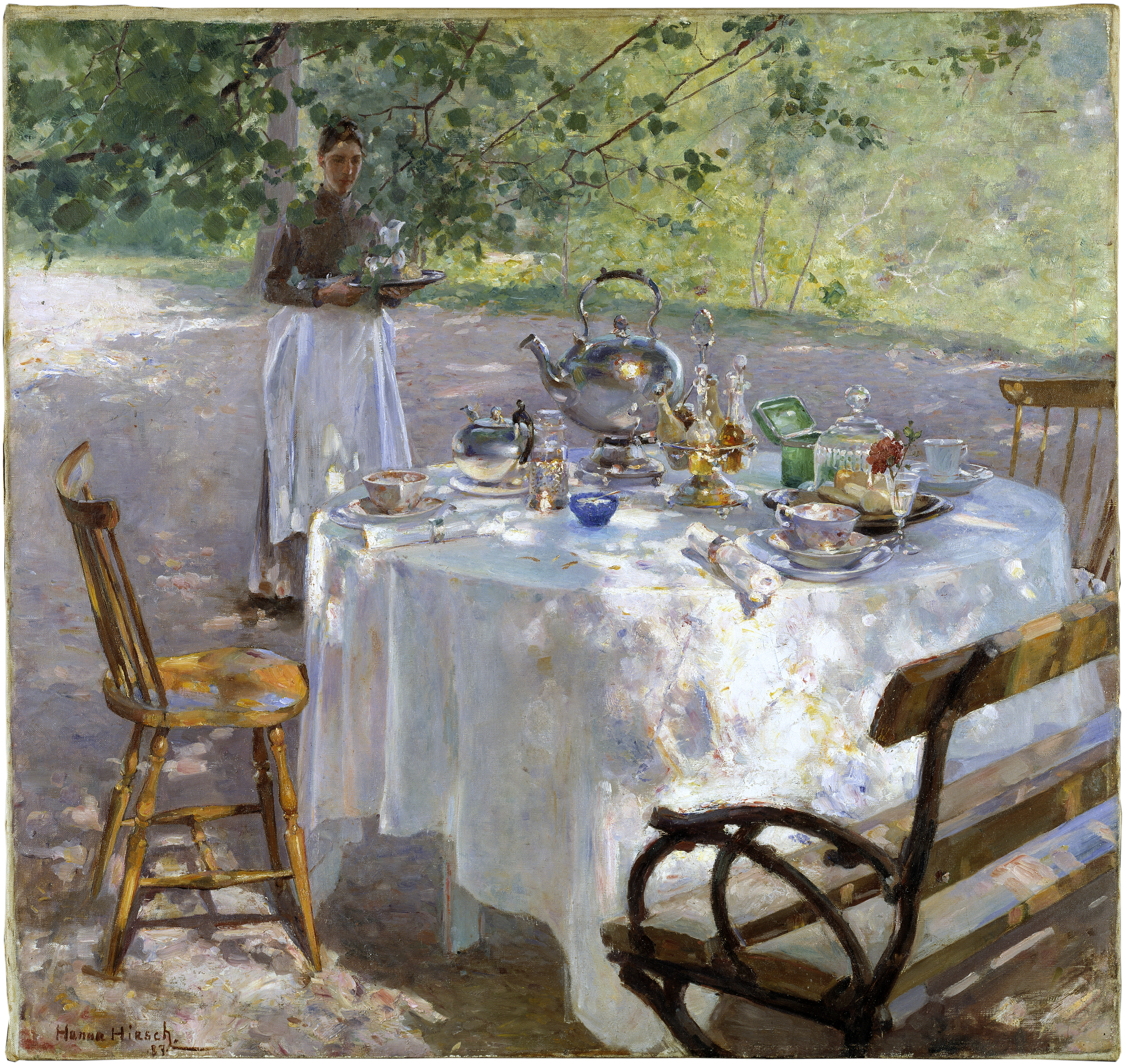
- Artist: Hanna Pauli
- Year: 1887
- Medium: Oil on canvas
- Dimensions: 91 cm × 87 cm (36 in × 34 in)
- Location: Nationalmuseum; Stockholm
- Owner: Nationalmuseum, Stockholm object nr: NM 1705

Breakfast time or Frukostdags is an oil painting completed in 1887 by the Swedish artist Hanna Pauli (1864–1940). It measures 91 by 87 centimetres (36 by 34 in) and currently belongs to the Nationalmuseum which bought it in 1910. The image shows a dining table standing in a garden. Breakfast time is one of the museum's most popular images, mentioned as one of the real pearls of the 1800s.

== Painting ==
The painting Breakfast time played a major role in Hanna Pauli's breakthrough in the Nordic art scene during the late 1880s. She had recently studied in Paris at the Académie Colarossi and entered the Paris Salon in 1887 with the portrait of her Finnish fellow artist and sculptor Venny Soldan, which is held by the Gothenburg Museum of Art.

An open-air painting, Breakfast time depicts a tranquil scene with a table set for breakfast on a sunny morning. Placed at the bottom right of the picture is a table covered with a white tablecloth alongside a bench and two chairs. It is positioned under a tree with its branches stretching over the table. A maid is approaching the table carrying a tray in her hands. The light is reflected from the shiny objects on the table and from the white tablecloth. The artist has been partly inspired by the impressionists' way of suggesting volumes and depth by using coloured lights and shadows, causing the table, the table setting and the foliage to dissolve in shimmering light reflexes. The painting was popular among contemporary Swedish artists of the time.

== Style ==
Hanna Pauli had an education of the wealthy middle class that adopted many of the features of noble life in the 18th century, such as learning to draw and paint with watercolour. However, she decided to pursue this further and became a professional artist. Many Swedish artists of the time studied at the Düsseldorf art school and in Paris, and Pauli was also tutored there. She was mainly influenced by the work of Carl Larsson, Peder Severin Krøyer, Laurits Andersen Ring and French artists like Jules Bastien-Lepage. The painting was not as popular among the broad public of the time as it was among her Nordic artist colleagues. The use of light, the vibrant brushwork applied in intervals, separately from each other without any blending or mixture, and the light spots fields composed by broad brushwork among other things, angered many contemporary Swedish critics. They saw Hanna Pauli's techniques as too radical and a critic derisively pointed out that perhaps the thick paint on the tablecloth was there because the artist was using it to clean and dry her brushes on it.

The painting of Breakfast time was completed by Hanna Pauli by the summer of 1887; later that year, in the autumn, she became engaged to her future husband, Georg Pauli, who was also an artist. When the painting was completed she was still unmarried, and the signature is her maiden name, Hanna Hirsch. Breakfast time was exhibited at the World Exhibition in Paris in 1889 and The Chicago World's Fair in 1893.
