= Hanna Pauli =

Swedish painter (1864–1940)

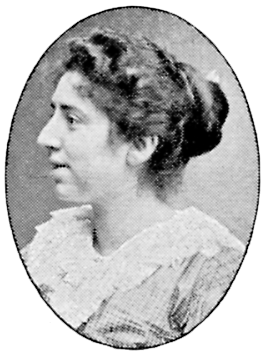
Hanna Hirsch-Pauli, from the Svenskt Porträttgalleri XX

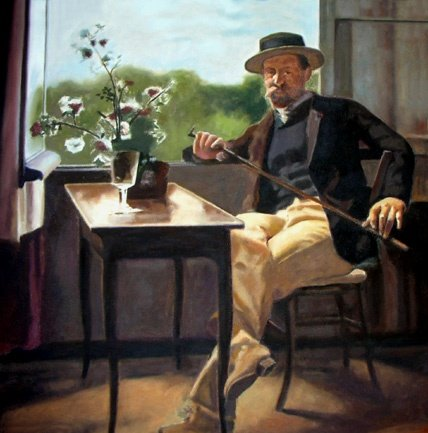
Portrait of Georg Pauli, c.1910

Hanna Hirsch, later Hanna Pauli (Stockholm, 13 January 1864 – 29 December 1940, Solna), was a Swedish painter; primarily of genre scenes and portraits.

== Life ==
Hanna Hirsch was a daughter of music publisher Abraham Hirsch. She was a friend of Eva Bonnier, and they followed each other through the painting school of August Malmström, and the Royal Swedish Academy of Arts in Stockholm. Hanna Hirsch studied in Paris from 1885 until 1887 at the Académie Colarossi, and shared a studio with Bonnier for part of that time. While working in Paris, she formed a number of close friendships with other women artists from the Nordic countries. She had her portrait of the Finnish artist Venny Soldan (now in the Gothenburg Art Museum) accepted to the Paris Salon in 1887. The portrait is realistic and unconventional for its time in portraying a female artist at work (sitting on the floor with clay in her hands) rather than in proper bourgeois attire. The casual informality of Soldan's expression and pose were "interpreted as reflecting the liberated lifestyle of Nordic women in Paris at the time" and the portrait was also considered indecent and denounced as bohemian.

Pauli described the portrait: "We had no major debts at the time. The studio was extremely cold and damp; my Finnish friend had to sit wearing a muff when I painted her. In the bedroom the damp ran down the walls, and there was only a small skylight in the roof. The material side of life troubled us very little at all … Moreover, my friend and I almost always plodded around in slippers; it saved so on shoe-leather and it was so very comfortable."

Pauli received a third class medal for her work at the Exposition Universelle (1889) in Paris. She exhibited her work at the Palace of Fine Arts at the 1893 World's Columbian Exposition in Chicago, Illinois.

As was the case with most other Swedish artists of her generation, her painting stood closer to the French juste milieu painters than to most impressionists; nevertheless, the thickly applied paint she used to show specks of light on the white tablecloth on her 1887 painting Frukostdags (Breakfast Time) (in Nationalmuseum, Stockholm) provoked one critic to comment that she had probably used the cloth to clean her brushes.

In 1887 she married the painter Georg Pauli and travelled with him to Italy for a year.

Her lifetime production was sparse and mostly consisting of portraits, painting artists and writers from her and her husband's circle of friends, such as the one of painter Karl Nordström (1890; in the Bonnier portrait collection, Nedre Manilla, Stockholm), writer Verner von Heidenstam as Hans Alienus (one of his literary characters, 1896), writer Selma Lagerlöf (1932, Nationalmuseum) and the group portrait Vänner (Friends, 1907, Nationalmuseum) showing writer Ellen Key reading to a group in the home of the Pauli family.

Pauli was included in the 2018 exhibit Women in Paris 1850-1900.

== Gallery ==
Portrait of Venny Soldan-Brofeldt, 1887.

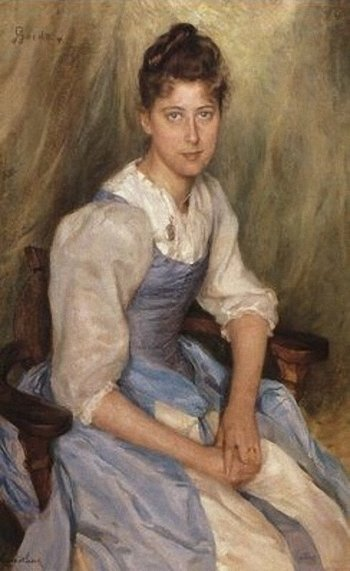
Gerda, 1891

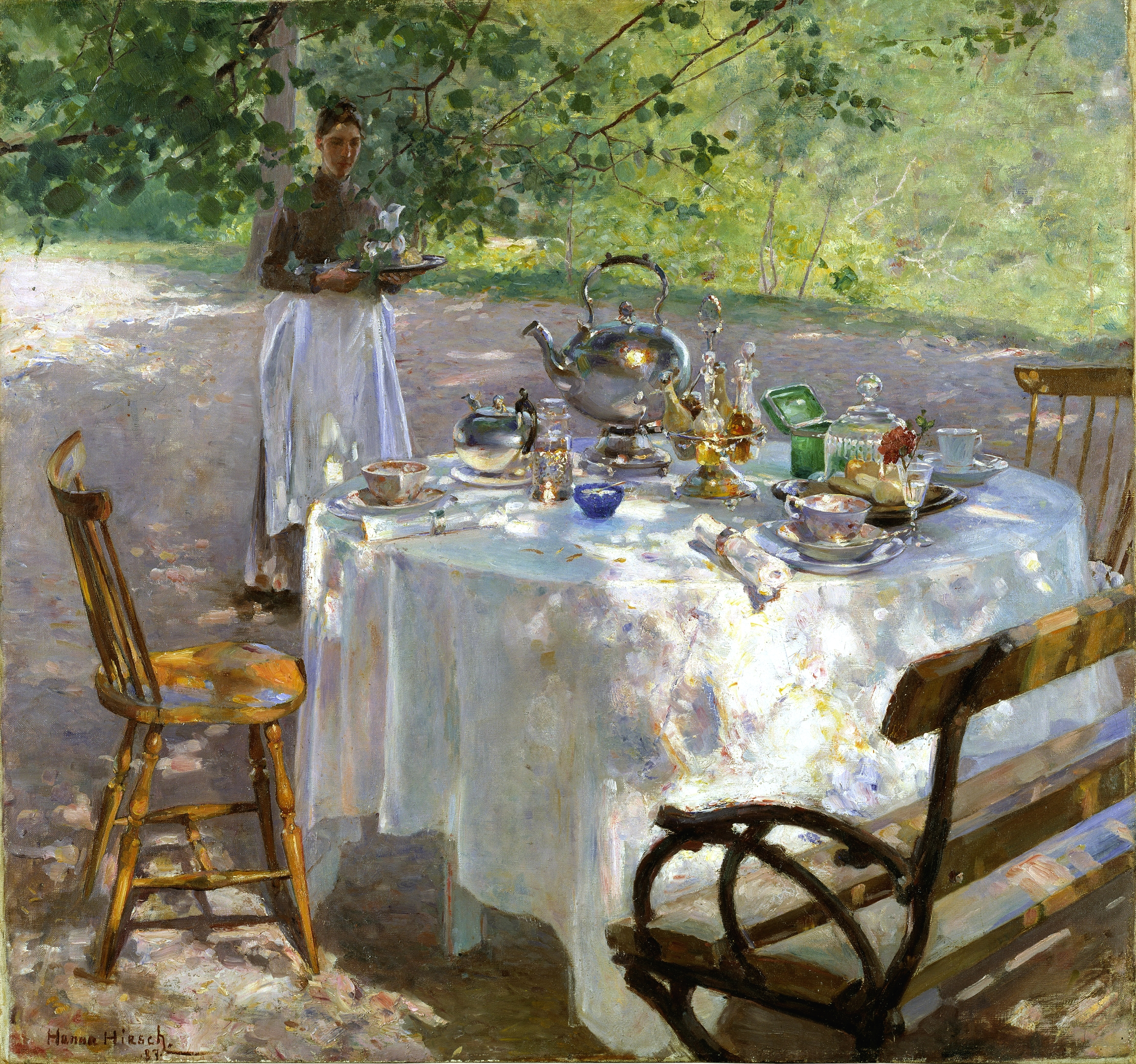
Breakfast Time, 1887

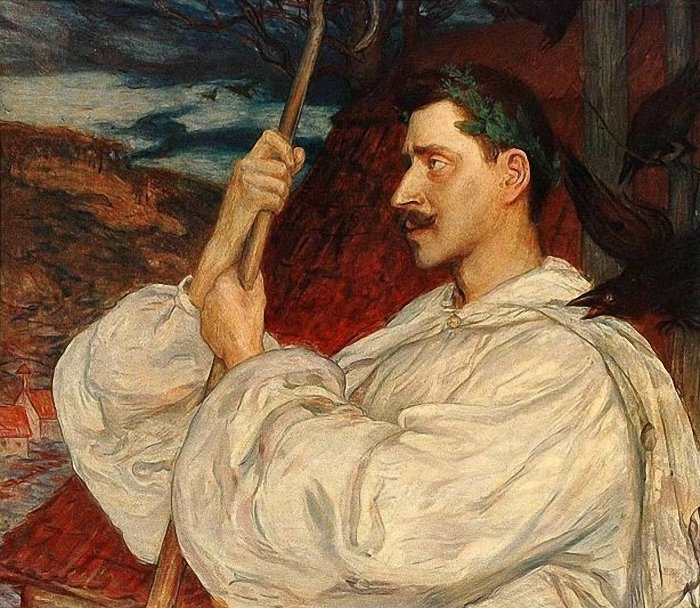
Verner von Heidenstam, 1896

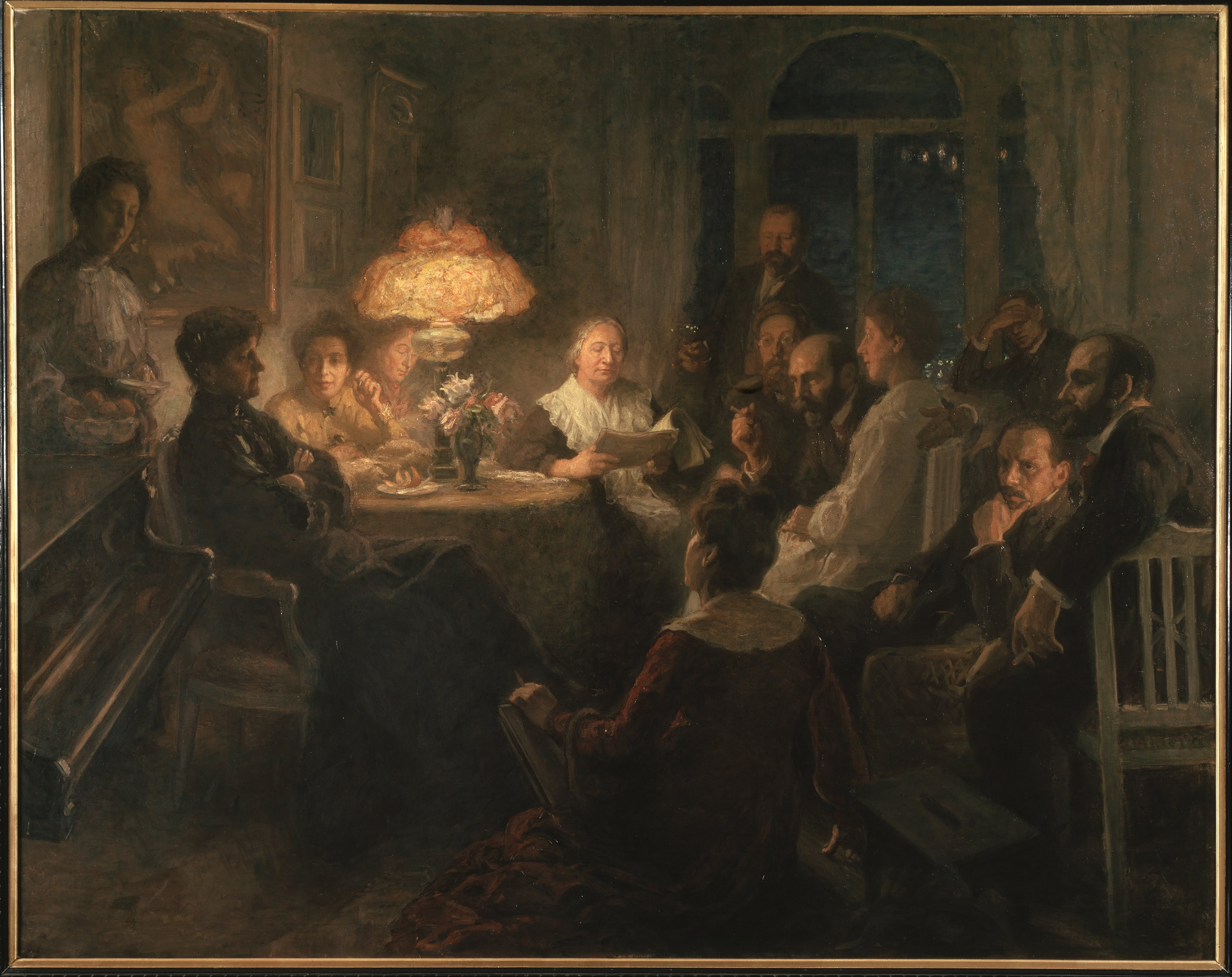
Friends, 1900s

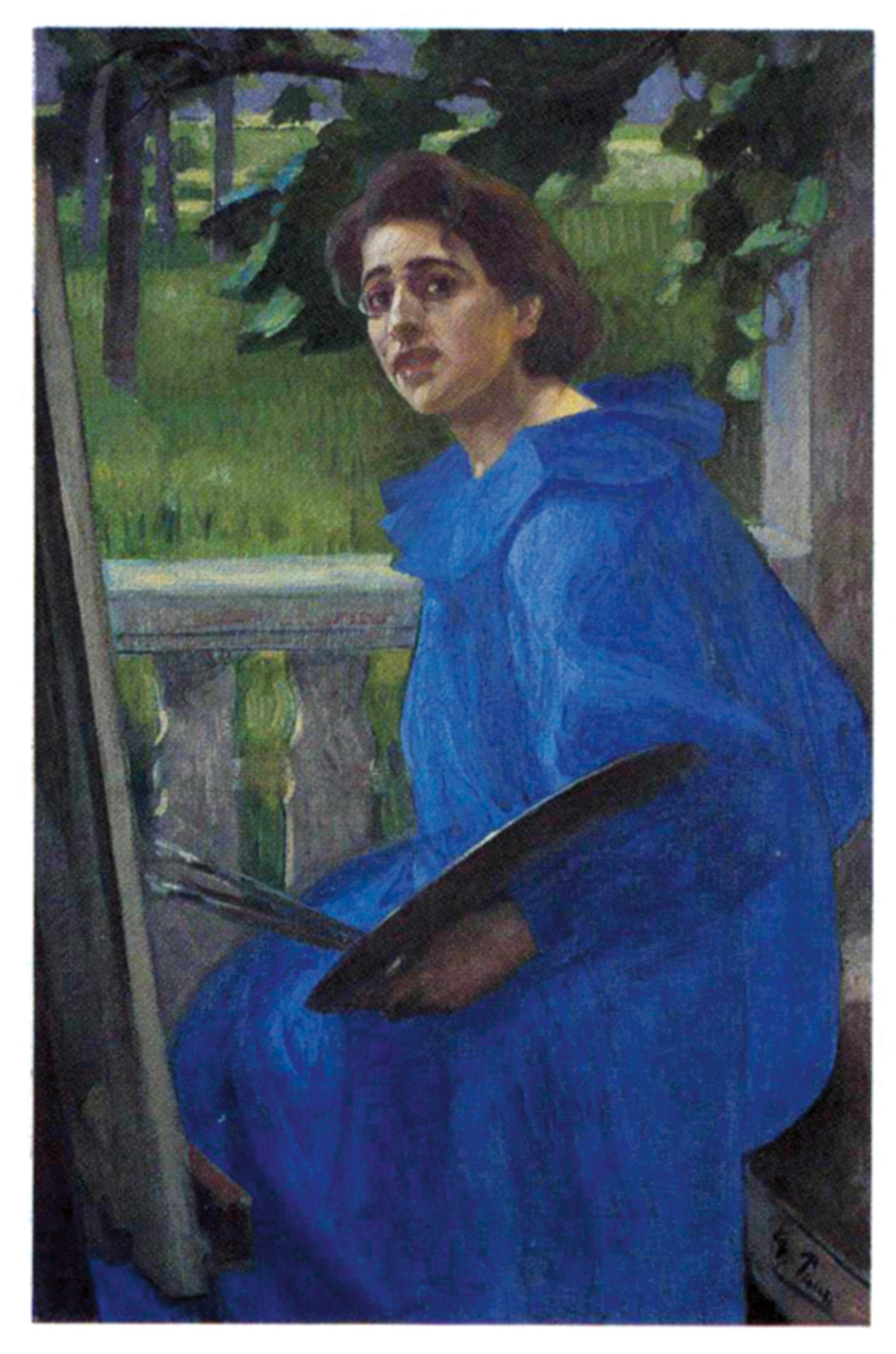
Hanna painted by her husband, Georg Pauli, 1896

== Other sources ==
- Gynning, Margareta: Det ambivalenta perspektivet: Eva Bonnier och Hanna Hirsch-Pauli i 1880-talets konstliv, Stockholm: Bonnier, (Diss. Uppsala University), 1999.
- Hansen, Vibeke Waallann, Women Artists in Paris 1850-1900, p. 76–77, Yale University Press. ISBN 978-0-300-22393-4
- Gothenburg Museum catalogue entry
- Rech, Carina: "Becoming Artists. Self-Portraits, Friendship Images and Studio Scenes by Nordic Women Painters in the 1880s", Gothenburg: Makadam, (Diss. Stockholm University), 2021. https://www.diva-portal.org/smash/get/diva2:1526796/FULLTEXT01.pdf
