= Georg Pauli =

Swedish painter (1855–1935)

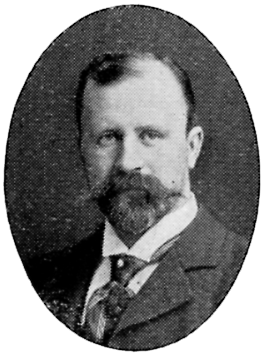
Georg Pauli, from the Svenskt Porträttgalleri XX

Georg Vilhelm Pauli (2 July 1855, Jönköping - 28 November 1935, Stockholm) was a Swedish painter, known primarily for portraits and figures. He was also the author of numerous art-related books.

== Biography ==
His father, August Ferdinand Pauli (1815-1904), was an apothecary and manufacturer. The family was descended from Lieutenant General Wilhelm Pauli (1730-1800). The original Pauli came from Italy under the sponsorship of Emperor Rudolf II, during the early part of the Thirty Years' War and later went to Sweden, where he was accepted into the nobility in 1625.

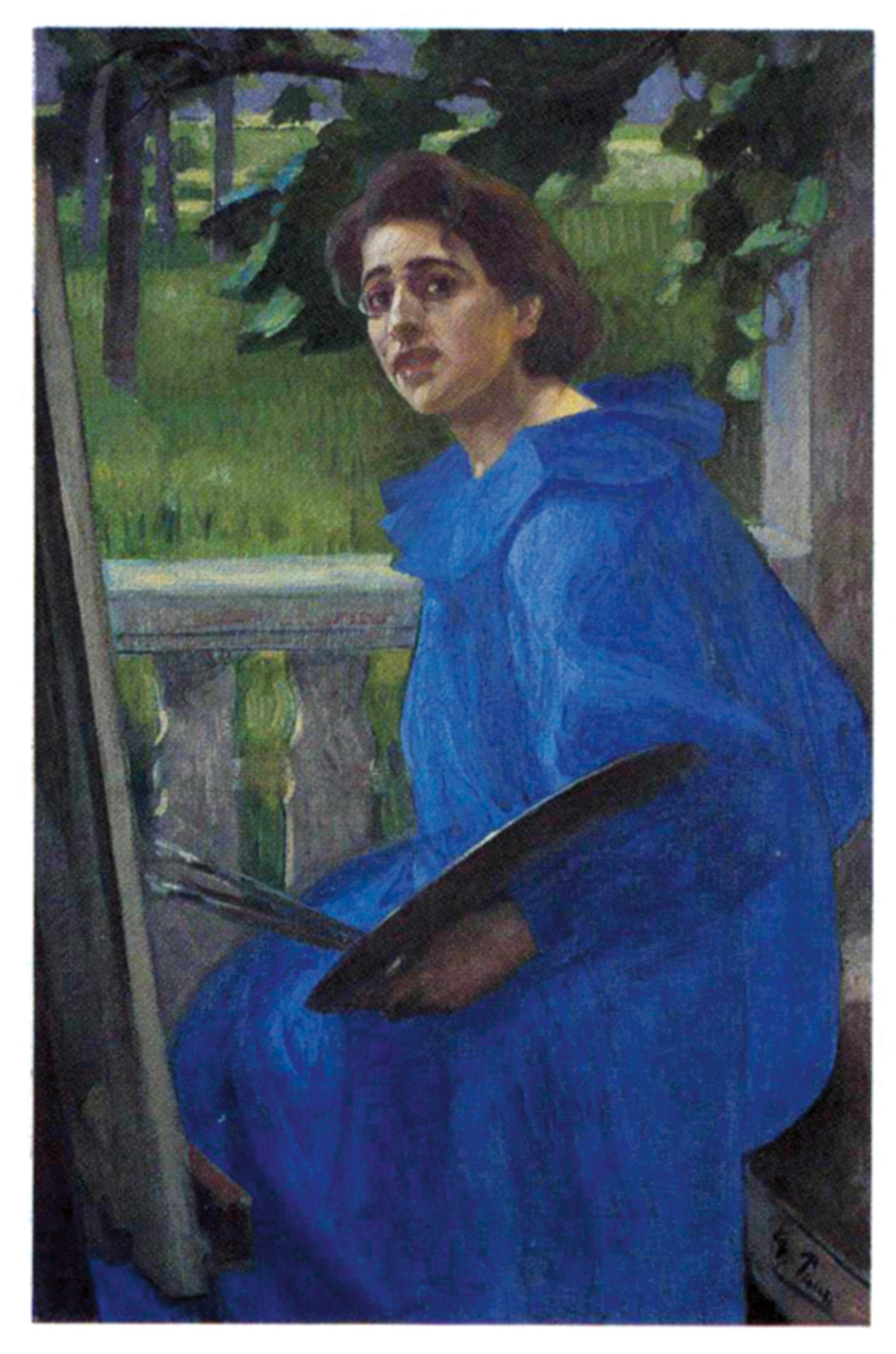
Portrait of his wife Hanna, 1896

He originally studied at the Royal Swedish Academy of Fine Arts during the 1870s and 1880s, then made several study trips abroad, primarily to Paris and Italy. He later became a teacher at the Valand Academy in Gothenburg.

In 1887, he married his fellow painter, Hanna Hirsch. In 1905, they moved into a manor house and studio called the "Villa Pauli", designed by Albin Brag, in Storängen, Nacka.

He spent much of his time creating decorative paintings; including frescoes in the "Ostindiska huset" (East India House, which is now home to the Göteborgs stadsmuseum), the "Södermalms läroverk" (which is now Södra Latin, a highly selective secondary school), and at the Östra Real, another secondary school. At the Per Brahegymnasiet, in his hometown, he created murals in the Cubist style that were very controversial. Similar works may be found at the Stockholm City Hall and the Royal Dramatic Theatre, which features a dining area with his works called the "Restaurang Pauli". He also created some minor murals at the headquarters of the Handelsbanken and at Waldemarsudde (now a museum) for Prince Eugen.

He was a member of the Opponenterna, a group of artists who were opposed to the teaching methods at the Royal Academy. In addition to painting, he wrote numerous historical/biographical works, including Ernst Josephson (1903 and 1914), Konstnärslif och om konst (1913), I Paris, nya konstens källa (1915), Väggmåleri (1920) and Prins Eugen (1925). He also wrote a memoir about his fellow artists in the opposition, I vår ungdom (1925) and stories of his travels, En målares resa (1922). From 1917 to 1921, he published an art journal called Flamman (often confused with a socialist newspaper of the same name).

His works may be seen at the Nationalmuseum, Nordiska museet, Uppsala University Library and the Göteborgs konstmuseum.

== Gallery ==
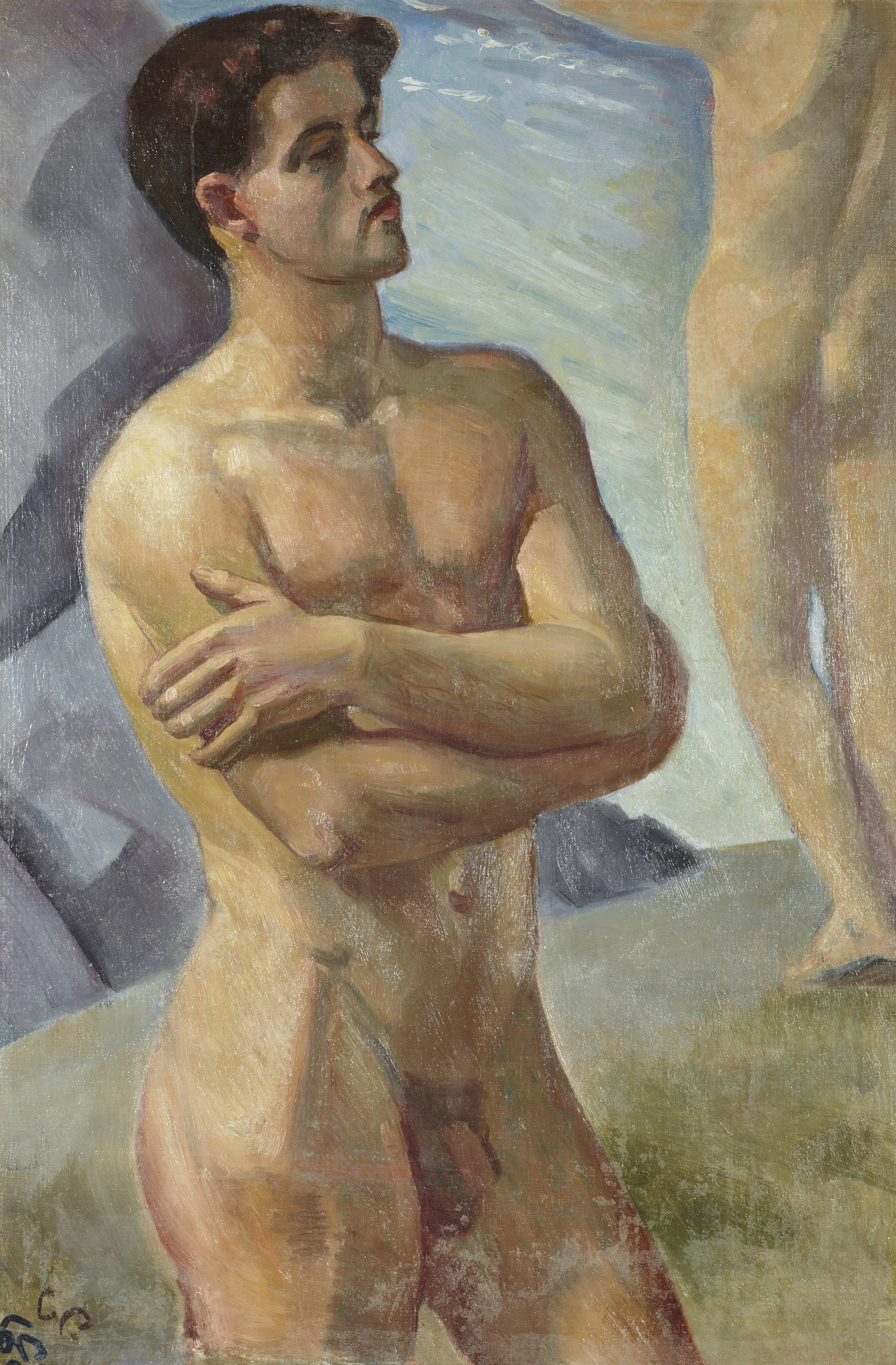
Bathing Men

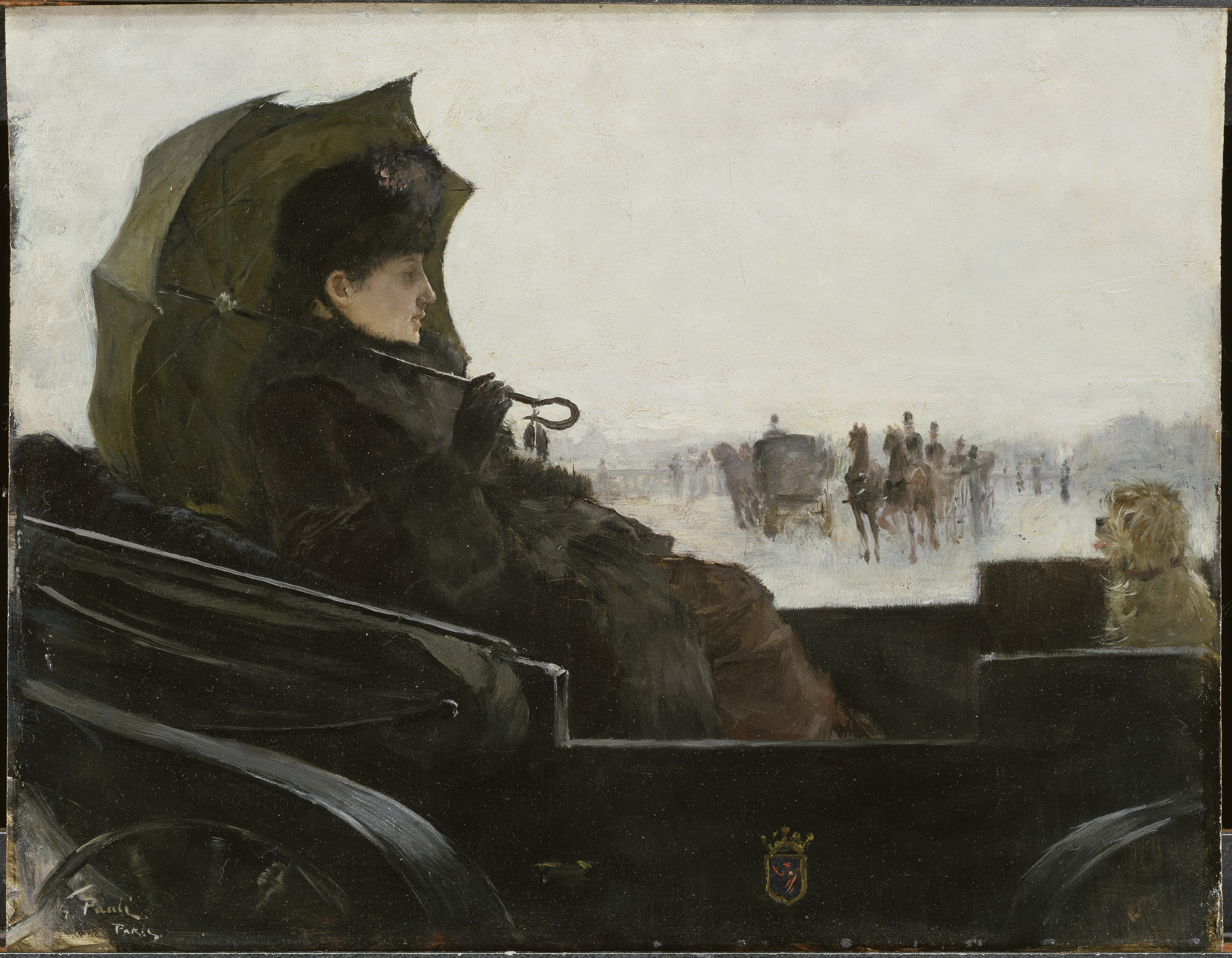
Lady in a Landau

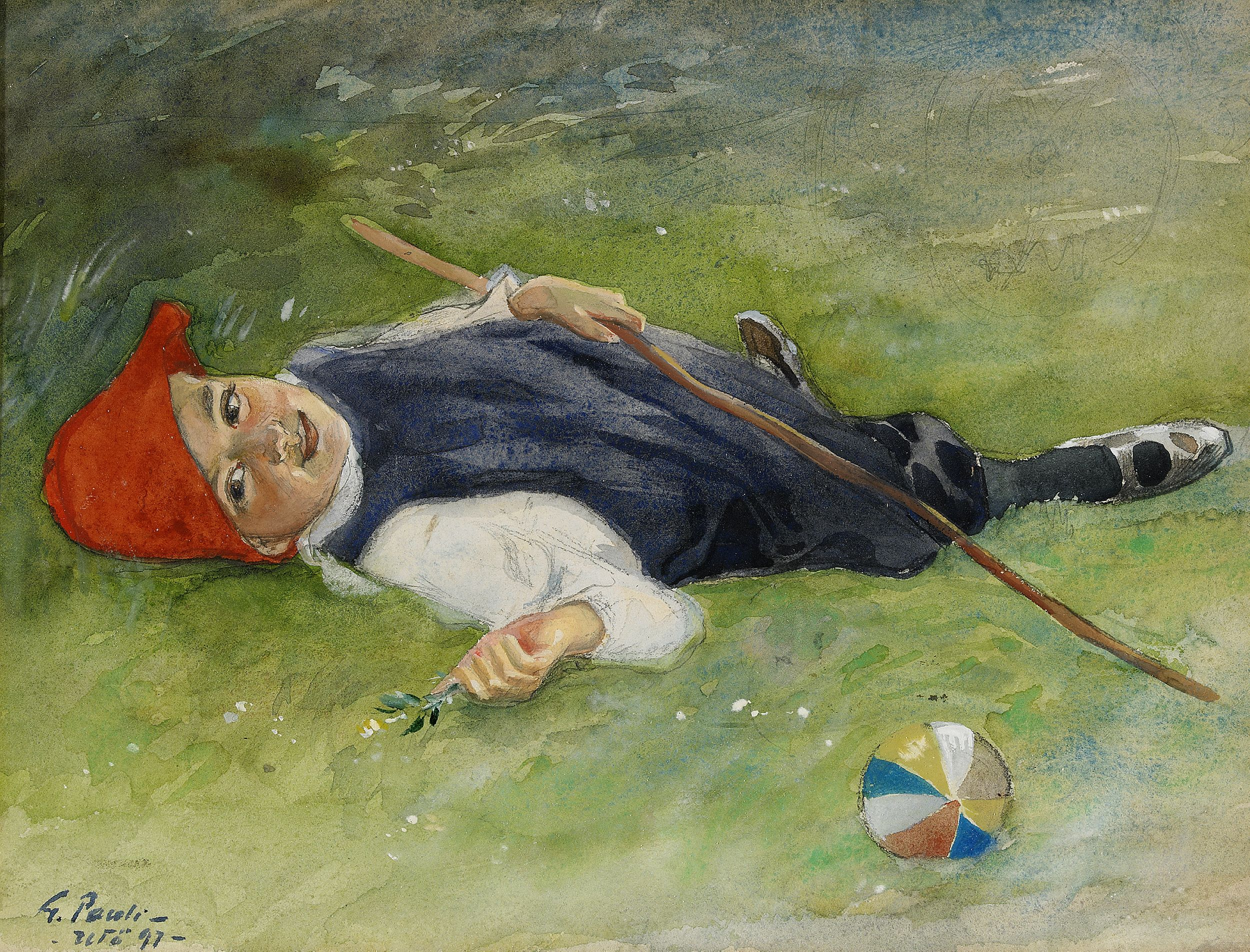
Göran in the Green Grass, 1897

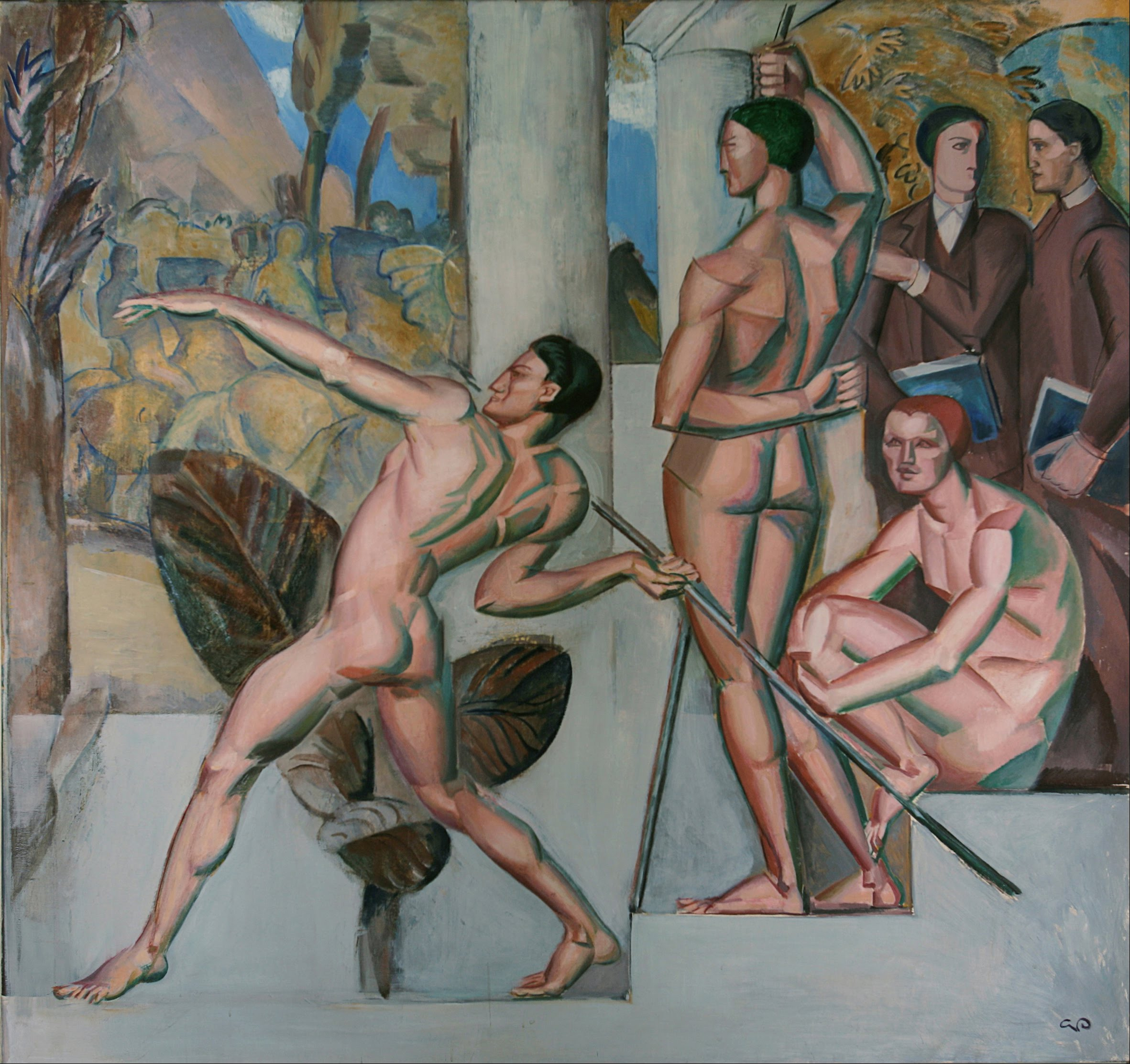
Mens Sana in Corpore Sano, 1912

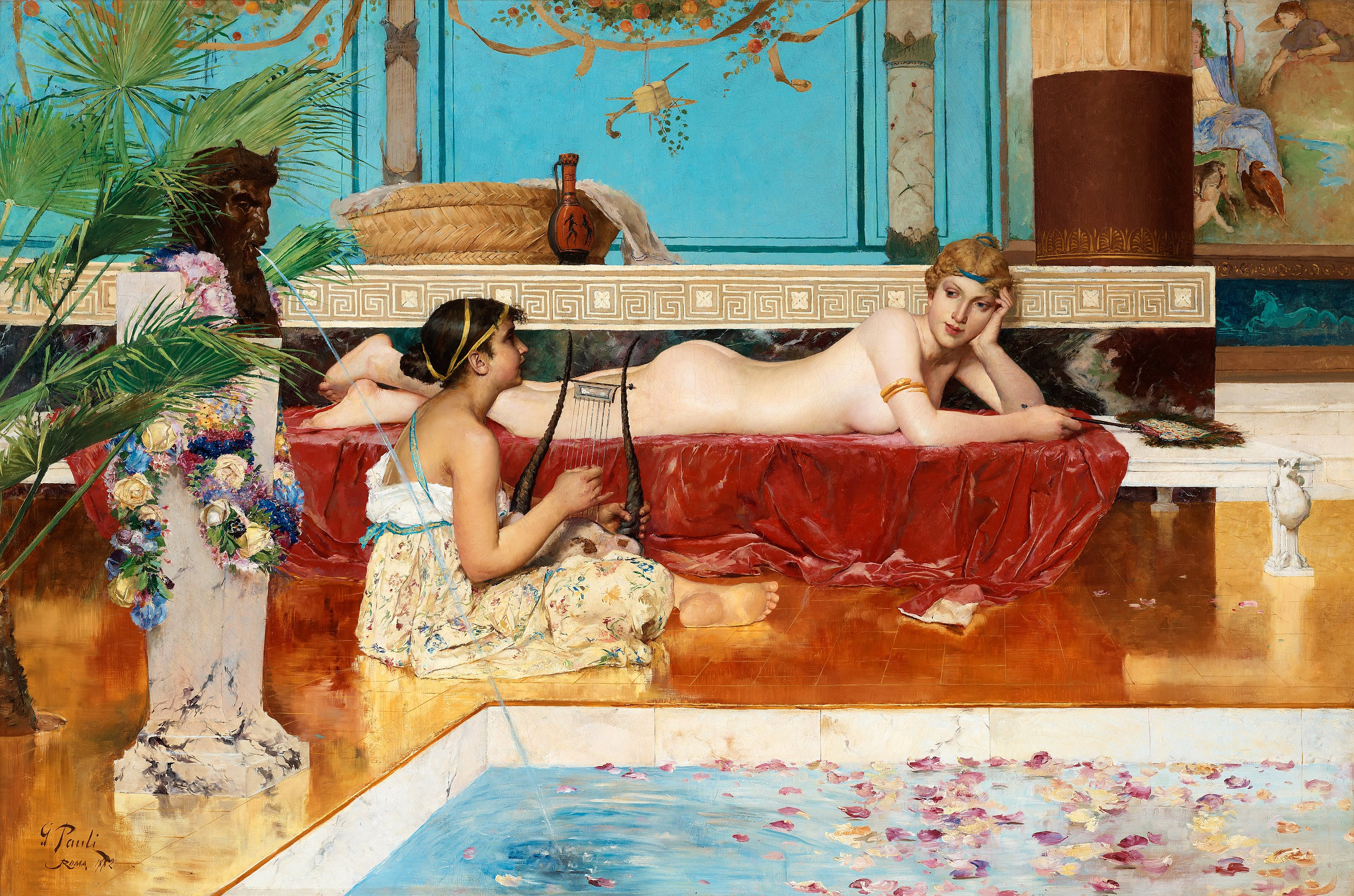
Roman Bath, 1882
