= Af Forselles =

Af Forselles is a surname and a noble family in the Swedish and Finnish nobilities.

Notable people with the surname include:

- Arthur af Forselles (1864–1953), Finnish physician and politician
- Cecilia af Forselles (born 1954), the National Librarian of Finland
- Jenny af Forselles (1869–1938), Finnish teacher and politician
- Louise af Forselles (1850–1934), Finnish philanthropist
- Sigrid af Forselles (1860–1935), Finnish sculptor
- Virginia af Forselles (1759–1847), Finnish ironmaster
