= Gordon Rossiter =

British-Swedish artist

Gordon Rossiter (born 27 March 1949) is a British-Swedish artist, living and working in Sweden. Much of his subject matter is inspired by life in the Salvation Army.

== Biography ==
Gordon Rossiter is well known within the international movement of the Salvation Army, which he has documented through the medium of oil painting and ceramics. Motifs show amongst other things the activities of the Salvation Army, open-air services in the streets and market places, marching bands, songsters and Christmas caroling. He has also portrayed many musicians and soldiers. Besides these subjects Rossiter has a great fascination for landscapes, being inspired by the Scottish Highlands and Swedish forests and lakes. He has also painted many West Country English villages, as well as Swedish villages, in oils and aquarelle.

Rossiter drew his first Salvation Army motif already when he was seven years old, since then, art has been a natural part of his life. After leaving secondary school he studied art at the Royal West of England Academy in Bristol for three years, and went on to complement his education by studying ceramics at Weston-Super-Mare Polytechnic.

Rossiter had his first exhibitions in the late 1970s in the UK, after which he has had exhibitions all over Sweden and the United States, and in conjunction with the Winter Olympics in Hamar, Norway. Many reproductions of his work have been produced in the form of Christmas cards, picture postcards, numbered prints of paintings, wall charts, Advent calendars. Further more his art works have been reproduced in various publications including front pages of the War Cry in Denmark, Finland, Norway, Sweden and the UK. Rossiter has illustrated books. He has sculptured the "Hanna Prize", a statuette in the likeness of Hanna Ouchterlony, the woman who took the Salvation Army to Sweden. This prize was awarded during the years 2005–2007. In 2005 the prize was presented to Carolina Kluft the famous Swedish athlete. These days Gordon Rossiter is an internationally recognised British-Swedish artist and is a member of BUS, the pictorial artists union.

== Exhibitions ==
- Woodspring Museum and Art Gallery, Somerset, UK, 1977
- Glastonbury, Somerset, UK, 1978
- Weston-super-mare, Somerset, UK, 1978, 1980, 1981
- Wells, Somerset, UK, 1979
- Örserum, Smålandsgården, Sweden, 1981
- Jönköping, Westers Galleri, Sweden, 1982, 1985
- Jönköping, Återvändsgatan, Gordons Galleri, Sweden, 1982-1999
- Jönköping, Galleri Per Brahe, Sweden, 1982,1985, 1988,1990
- New York, USA, Salvation Army Center 52nd Street, 1984
- Örebro, Salvation Army, Sweden, 1986, 1988
- Jönköping, Galleri Blå, Sweden, 1990
- Tranås, Sännevadet, Sweden, 1991
- Vätterbygdens Folkhögskola, Nordic Music Leadership Conference, Sweden, 1993
- Riddersberg Hantverksdagar, Sweden, 1993
- Högabergsgården, Sweden, 1993
- The Winter Olympics, Hamar, Norway, 1994
- Jönköping, Rötter konferens, Sweden, 2002
- Nässjö, Salvation Army, Sweden, 2007, 2008
- Månsarps Missionskyrka, Sweden, 2009
- Jönköping, Rådhusparken, Sweden, 2011
- Jönköpings Läns (County) Museum, "Få skjuts i tiden", Sweden, 2013-2014
- Månsarps Missionskyrka, Sweden, 2015
- Jönköping, Williams Hörna, Salvation Army, Sweden, 1998-2017

== Public works ==
- William H.P. Brown Photographic Studio, Upminster, Essex, UK, Ceramic sign, 1982
- Frälsningsarméns center, New York, 52nd Street, USA, painting, 1984
- Frälsningsarméns huvudkontor, New York, 14th Street, USA, painting, 1984
- Bilspedition (logistics firm) HQ, Stockholm, Sweden, Triptych Painting "Riddarefjärden", 1987
- The Salvation Army Corps, Jönköping, "100 years jubilee " triptych painting, 1988
- Handelsbanken, Merchant Bank, Jönköping. Painting "Jönköping East", 1988
- The Salvation Army Training College, Moss, Norway, Ceramic sign, 1988
- BPA Painting and Decorating Firm, HQ, Slottsgatan, Jönköping, Wall Painting "The Cat", 1989
- The Salvation Army Officers College, Skepparegatan, Stockholm, Sweden— Painting "With Christ into the future" for the college 75th jubilee, 1990
- The Council House Tranås, Sweden. Painting "Open-air in the Market Place" 1990
- Sparbanken Swedbank, Tranås, Painting, 1990
- PSR Licensed Conveyancer, Burnham-On-Sea, UK, 6 paintings, 1991
- Återvändsgatan, Jönköping, Sweden, Two Ceramic Villages, 1991
- The Salvation Army, Oslo, Norway, Painting "The 17th of May", 1994
- The Salvation Army Corps, Tranås, Sweden, Painting "Open-air in the Market Place", 1995
- The Salvation Army Camp, Högaberg, Sweden, Ceramic Sculpture "25th Jubilee", 1996
- The Salvation Army Corps 393, Stockholm. Ceramic "The Holy Grail", 2000
- The Salvation Army Family Center, Jönköping. Paintings "Christ´s Bidding" "Children Playing", "Midsummer Girls" "Trying it out", 2000
- The Salvation Army Infants School "Vårsol", Jönköping. Paintings "Children Playing in the Rain" — "Testing the Ice", 2000
- The Salvation Army Chapel, Ågesta, Stockholm. Painting "Save Souls", 2007
- The Salvation Army Temple, Stockholm. Painting "Water Play", 2007
- The Salvation Army Bible Institution, Ågesta, Stockholm. Painting "With Christ into the future", 2007
- The Salvation Army HQ, Stockholm. Ceramic Statuette ”Hanna Ouchterlony”, 2009
- Månsarps Mission Church. Painting ”Månsarps Mission Church”, 2009
- Sundsgårdens School and Treatment Home, Svartsjö, Ekerö, Stockholm.— Triptych ”In Safe Hands”, 2010
- The Salvation Army FAM House, Fristad, Borås, Sweden. Paintings ”Light in the Dark”, ”Fight the Good Fight”,”The Mountains where God lives”, ”St Abbs, the wild sea”, ”St Abbs, the coast”, ”St Abbs, the front”, ”The light house, Jersey.”, 2011–13
- The Salvation Army HQ, Oslo, Norway. Ceramic Statuettes ”Hanna Ouchterlony” —— and ”William Booth”, 2014
- The Salvation Army Corps, Södra Vätterbygden, Painting ”Congress In Kalmar 1985”, 2016
