= Claire Aho =

Finnish photographer (1925–2015)

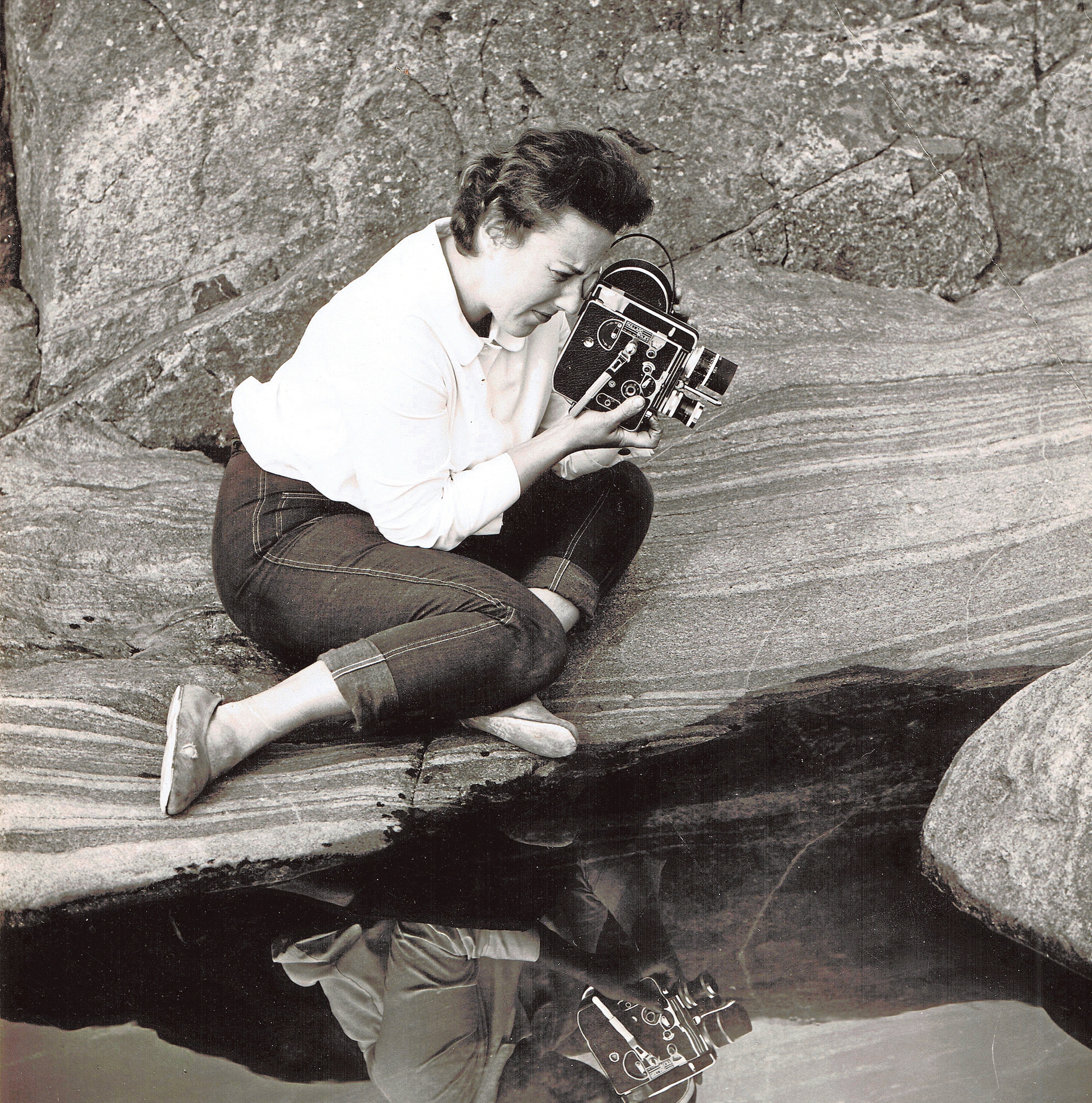
Claire Aho in Tvärminne, 1961.

Claire Anita Aho (2 November 1925 – 29 November 2015) was a Finnish photographer.

== Early life ==
Born in Helsinki, Claire Aho was the daughter of Finnish film director Heikki Aho (son of the Finnish national author Juhani Aho and his artist wife Venny Soldan-Brofeldt). Claire's mother, Dinah Selkina, was a Lithuanian-born dancer.

== Career ==
She started her career in the 1940s at the Aho & Soldan company, owned by her family. In the 1950s and 1960s, she was an early proponent of colour photography in Finland.

Aho moved to Sweden in 1974 where she worked as a photographer for several newspapers including Hufvudstadsbladet and with Nordic Museum.

Aho's photos have been exhibited in Kiel and London among others. A major retrospective of her work was held in Helsinki in 2011.

== Death and legacy ==
Claire Aho died in Stockholm on 29 November 2015 in a fire in her home. She was 90 years old.

An award for female journalists has been named after her.
