= Gåsö =

Island in Bohuslän, Sweden

Coordinates: 58°14′2.47″N 11°24′29.78″E

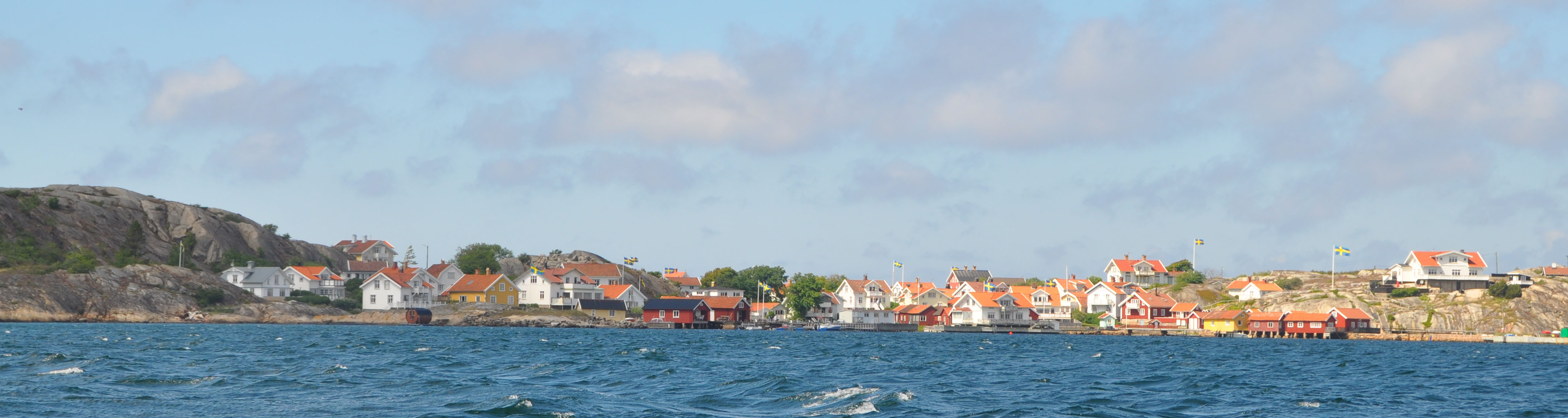
View of Gåsö Island

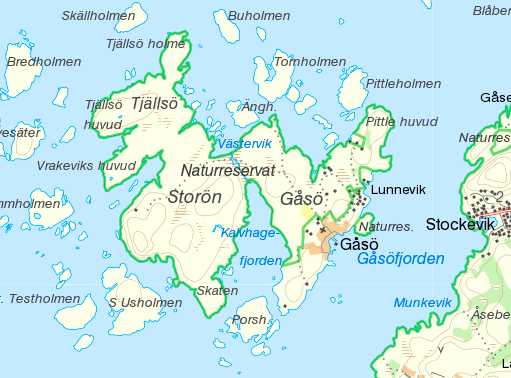
Topographic map of Gåsö and surrounding islands

Gåsö is an island in the Swedish province of Bohuslän, county of Lysekil. Gåsö is situated at the entrance of the Gullmarn fjord and is a part of the Gullmarn nature reserve. The Gåsö archipelago consists partly of two larger islands, Gåsö and Storön, and partly of a large number of smaller islands. The old fishing village on the main island is today (with the exception of one individual Lennart Tham) only inhabited during summer, when the population reaches approximately 250 people. The Gåsö archipelago has many natural harbours and is a popular destination for boating tourists.

== Suitcase Murder ==
Gåsö gained some notoriety in August 1969 when a suitcase containing the dismembered remains of a woman was found in the water by two divers. The incident was known as the Suitcase Murder (Swedish: Koffertmordet). The woman was identified as Countess Margareta af Forselles, of the af Forselles family, from Gothenburg. The case was closed and a suspect was never arrested
