= Heikki Aho (filmmaker) =

Finnish documentary filmmaker

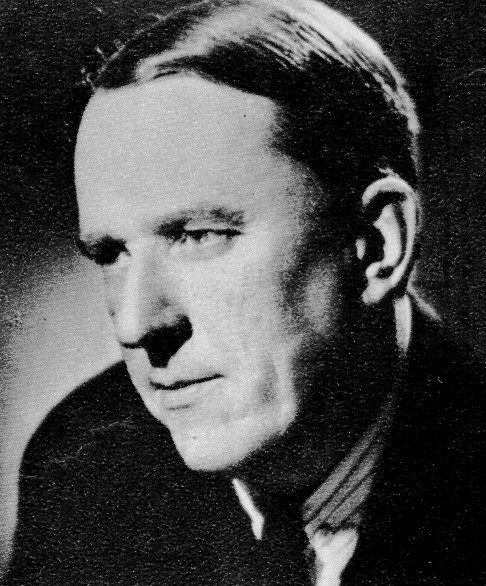
Heikki Aho

Heikki Taavetti Aho (29 May 1895 – 27 April 1961) is viewed as a pioneer of Finnish documentary film. Aho worked with his half-brother Björn Soldan (1902–1953) through their film production company Aho & Soldan (1925–1961) the Finnish documentary film tradition was born. Aho & Soldan was founded in 1925 in Helsinki, largely to enable a visual image of Finland as a newly born nation, and was active until 1961.

== Life ==
Heikki Taavetti Aho was born in Hausjärvi, the eldest son of Finnish writer Juhani Aho and his artist wife Venny Soldan-Brofeldt. He was raised in the family villa Ahola in Järvenpää. He had one brother Antti and a half-brother Björn (they were born from the same father and their mothers were sisters). Björn Soldan was born to Juhani Aho and Venny's younger sister Mathilda "Tilly" Soldan.

During the 1910s, he studied engineering in the Helsinki University of Technology. In the 1918 Finnish Civil War he served in the Red administration, but was captured by the Whites after the Battle of Vyborg.

In the 1920s, Aho continued his studies in Dresden, Germany, where he graduated as Master of Science. While in Germany, he found his future wife, Lithuanian-born Dinah Selkina. They married in 1923 and had one daughter, Claire, who became a photographer in Finland and Sweden. Aho died in Helsinki on April 27, 1961.

== Awards and publications ==
Aho & Soldan produced more than 400 documentary films, is the largest such producer in the 1930s in Finland, as well as the movie JUHA (1937) directed by Nyrki Tapiovaara and based on the book by their father, the Finnish author Juhani Aho. Numerous films, such as the “Finland Calling”-films from 1932 onwards as well as the films 1927, 1945, and 1961, about the family's friend, the Finnish composer Jean Sibelius, have been shown internationally.

Aho & Soldan Lifetime Achievement Award, which´ criteria include a remarkable life's work and contribution to the Finnish creative documentary film and a successful long-lasting career as a documentary film director, is given by Docpoint, the annual Helsinki documentary film festival.

They were members of the ABISS-group (Aho, Brückner, Iffland, Setälä, Soldan) in the 1930s, focusing on Neues Sehen (New Vision) photography movement inspired by the Bauhaus. They focused on documentary photography as well as artistic photography and created thousands of pictures.

Their photographic work has been published in numerous magazines over several decades and has been displayed through a number of exhibitions such as at Helsingin Taidehalli, Helsinki 1930 and 1984, Salong Strindberg, Helsinki 1930, Alvar Aalto´s The Finnish Pavilion at The 1939 New York World's Fair, The Finnish Museum of Photography, Helsinki 1987, The Finnish Film Archive, Helsinki 1992 and Musée d´art Moderne et Contemporain, Strasbourg 1999. Similarly, their films are shown regularly at film festivals in Finland as well as abroad.

Several books featuring the work of Aho & Soldan have been published throughout the 1930s – 1950s in different languages.
