= Hanna Ouchterlony =

Swedish officer of the Salvation Army(1838–1924)

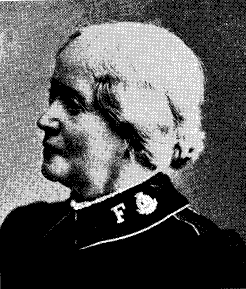
Hanna Ouchterlony

Hanna Cordelia Ouchterlony (14 September 1838 – 28 February 1924) was a Swedish officer of the Salvation Army. She introduced the Salvation Army in Sweden in 1882, and in Norway in 1888. She served as the leader of the Swedish Salvation Army from 1882 until 1892.

== Life ==
Hanna Ouchterlony was the daughter of the landowner and deputy judge Fabian Constantin Ouchterlony and Hilda Johanna Servais and born in Värnamo, Sweden. She served as housekeeper with relatives in Stockholm from 1857 to 1864 and then opened a book shop in Värnamo. In the 1870s, she had a religious crisis, and became active within Christian social work.

In 1878, she became acquainted with Bramwell Booth, who visited Värnamo for recreation. She became identified with the values of the Salvation Army, and Booth considered her suitable to introduce the movement to Sweden. Between 1878 and 1881, she took correspondence courses for the Salvation Army, and in 1881, she visited London, where she stayed in the home of Catherine Booth and William Booth. She became an officer of the Salvation Army in London 28 November 1882, and upon her return to Sweden, she introduced the movement there.

She served as the chief of the Swedish Salvation Army from 1882 until 1892, and editor of its paper in Sweden, Stridsropet 1883–1888. In 1887–1888, she founded the Norwegian Salvation Army. She traveled for the Salvation Army in the United States in 1892 and was the territorial leader of the movement between 1894 and 1900. She retired in 1904 and died in Stockholm in 1924.

== See also ==
- Louise af Forselles
