= Cecilia af Forselles =

Finnish historian

- Born: 30 June 1954; Helsinki
- Occupation: Librarian
- Awards: Knight First Class of the Order of the Lion of Finland (2014)

Maria Cecilia Margit af Forselles (born 1954, Helsinki, Finland) is the Director of the National Library of Finland.

Cecilia af Forselles, Professor and National Librarian, took over the management of the National Library of Finland at the beginning of 2019. One of her first tasks was to lead the preparation of a new ten-year strategy for the Finnish National Library. The new strategy has now been launched and from the beginning of 2021 will direct planning of the development of the National Library until 2030. The strategy underlines the importance of equal and open information services as well as sustainable development. It aims to strengthen the knowledge base in society. It is also a strong statement in favor of widely preserving published cultural heritage with different origins, as well as of promoting open science and publishing, development of digital environments and new data services.

== Career ==
Before her appointment to the position of National Librarian, af Forselles worked as the Head Librarian at the Finnish Literature Society (SKS) from 2005 to 2018. Prior to that, she held various positions at the University of Helsinki and the National Library of Finland. During her career, Director Cecilia af Forselles has edited and published scientific publications and articles in scientific collections and other publications in the fields of the history of science and learning, book and cultural history and the history of cartography. Af Forselles defended her doctoral thesis in history at the University of Helsinki in 2001.

== Research ==
Studies by af Forselles relate to literary culture as well as to the history of learning and ideas, the cultural history of Kalevala translations into English, the transformation of reading culture and scientific orientations, and the emergence of oral culture and natural sciences in academic discussion in the 18th century. Her recent studies relate to natural history and the history of ideas about the natural world.

== Positions of trust ==
Af Forselles has been a member of the organizing committees of several international conferences. She is also Chair of the Finnish Society for the History of Science and Learning and a Member of the Board of the Federation of Finnish Learned Societies (TSV) (Vice Chair 2015–). She has held various positions of trust in scientific societies, foundations, cultural institutes, museums etc. For several years, she served as a Member of the Board of the National Library of Finland, the Council for the Special Libraries, the Board of the Seurasaari Foundation, and the organizing committee of Science Forum 2017. She has delivered talks at Science Forum 2017 and Science Forum 2021.

In 1997, af Forselles received the award of the Swedish-Finnish Cultural Foundation.

== Publications ==
- The Emergence of Finnish Reading and Book Culture in the 1700s'. Ed. Cecilia af Forselles & Tuija Laine, Studia Fennica Litteraria, Helsinki 2017.
- National Bibliography of Finland: A.E. Nordenskiöld.
- The A. E. Nordenskiöld Collection. Annotated Catalogue of Maps made up to 1800. Vol. 5:1. & 5:2 (1995).
