= Ahola =

Ahola is a Finnish surname. Notable people with the surname include:

- Jarkko Ahola (born 1977), Finnish heavy metal artist
- Jouko Ahola (born 1970), Finnish strongman, powerlifter and actor
- Mika Ahola (1974–2012), Finnish enduro rider and a five-time world champion
- Peter Ahola (born 1968), Finnish ice hockey player
- Sanni Ahola (born 2000), Finnish ice hockey goaltender
- Sylvester Ahola (1902–1995), American jazz trumpeter
- Terry Ahola, American skier

== See also ==
- Ahöla, a spirit being in Hopi religion
