= Venny Soldan-Brofeldt =

Finnish painter (1863–1945)

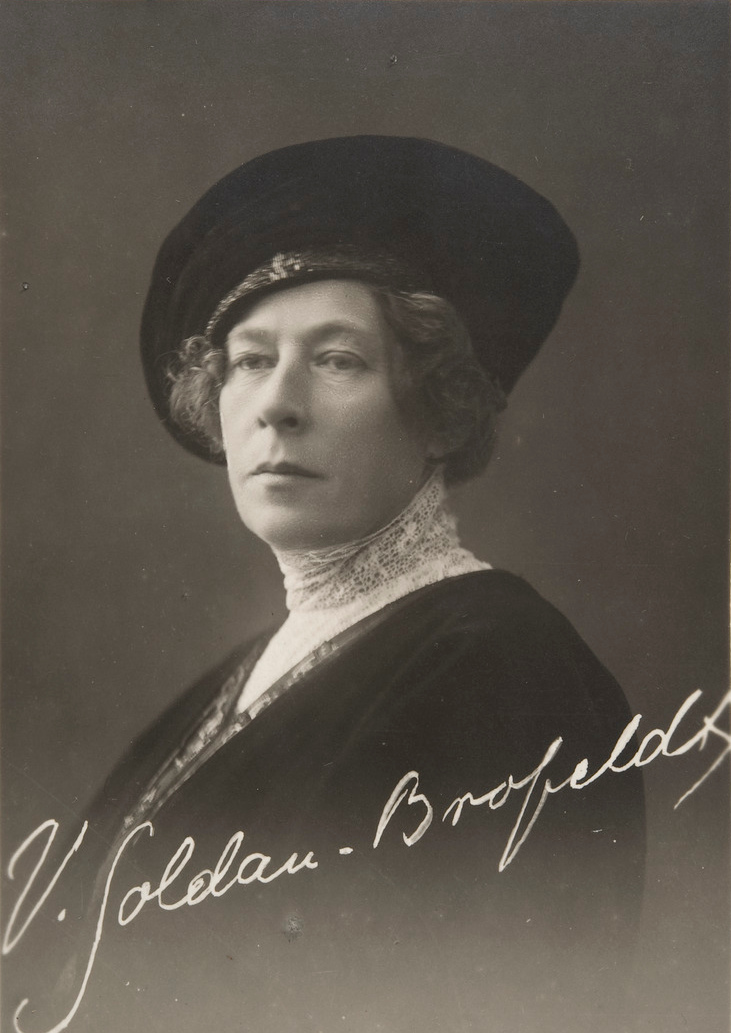
- Born: Wendla Irene Soldan; 2 November 1863; Helsinki, Grand Duchy of Finland
- Died: 10 October 1945 (aged 81); Lohja, Finland
- Known for: Painter

Wendla Irene Soldan-Brofeldt, known as Venny (2 November 1863, Helsinki – 10 October 1945, Lohja) was a Finnish painter, illustrator, graphic artist, wood sculptor and jewelry designer. She belonged to the Swedish speaking population of Finland.

== Biography ==
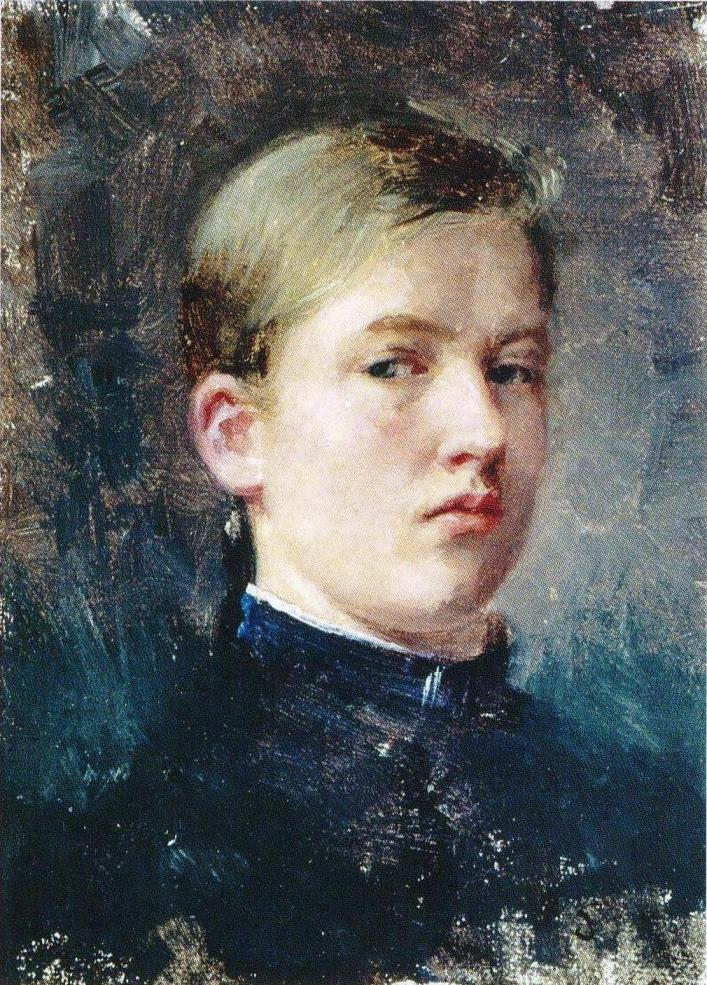
Self-Portrait, 1882

She was born as Wendla Irene Soldan. Her father, August Fredrik Soldan was the Director of the Mint of Finland. Her mother, Marie Müller (1837–1927), was German. Swedish was spoken at home. Her desire to become an artist received her family's wholehearted support. From 1880 to 1884, she initially attended the drawing school of the Finnish Art Association (now the Academy of Fine Arts), but also studied privately with Maria Wiik and attended classes in St.Petersburg from 1883 to 1885. She was briefly a student at the Académie Colarossi in Paris on two occasions. She also made study trips to Spain and Italy with the money she earned copying old classics. Upon returning to Helsinki, she became an art teacher.

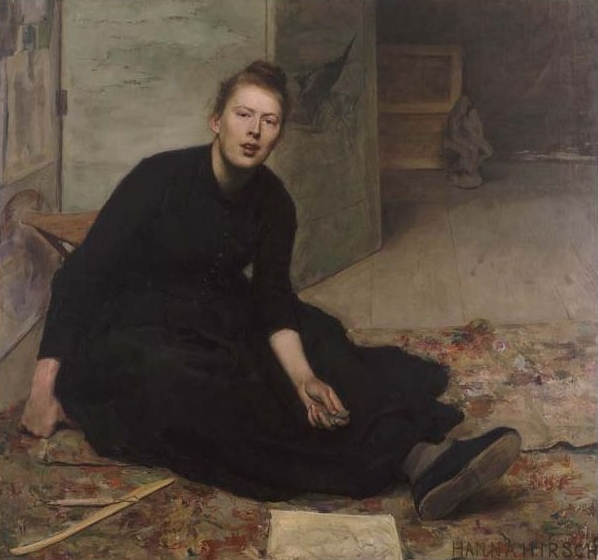
Portrait by Hanna Pauli, 1885

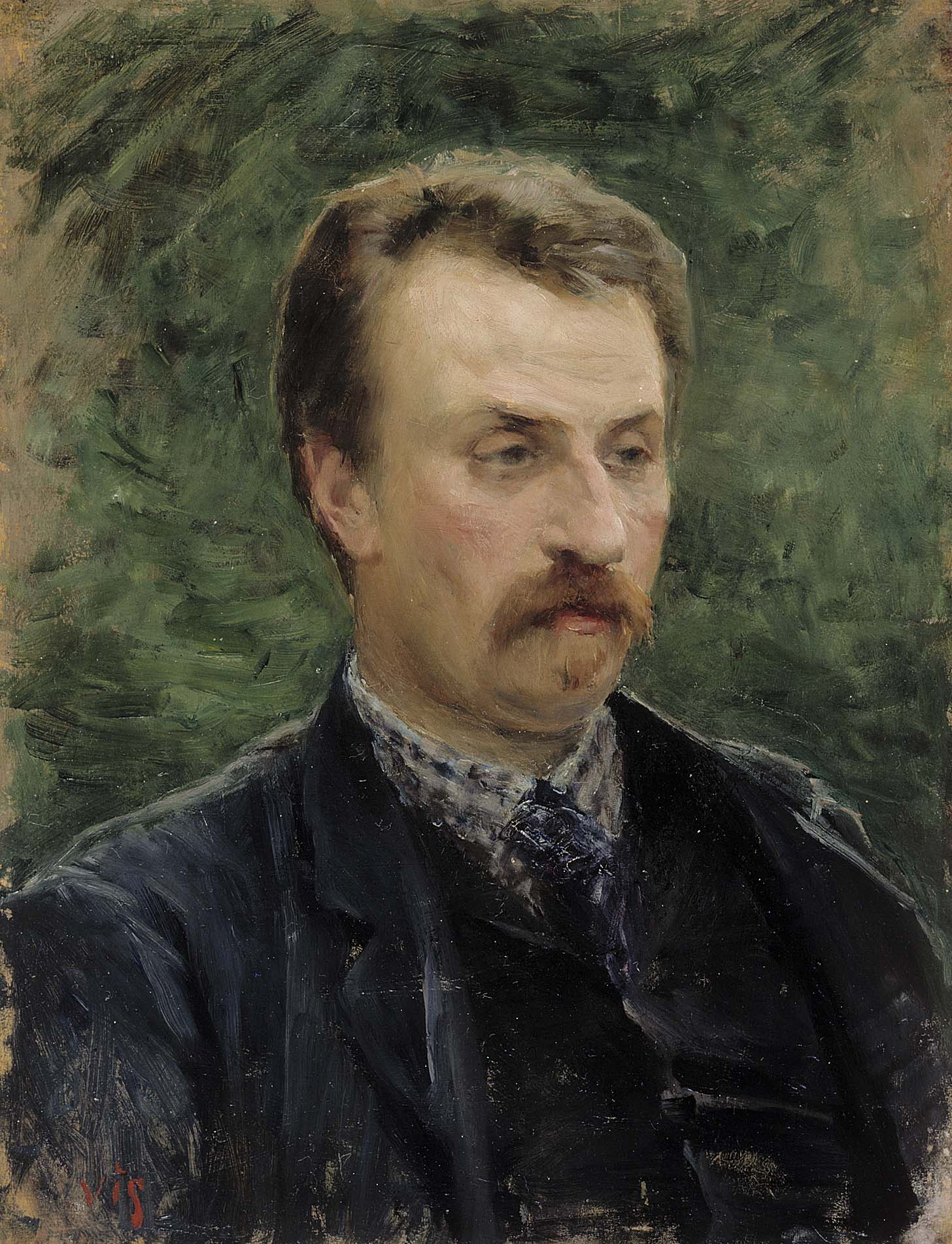
Portrait of Juhani Aho, 1891

In 1890, she met the writer, Juhani Aho, at the studios of Anna Sahlstén. Soon, they were enamored of each other; attending concerts, going to the theater and taking trips into the countryside. In 1891, they were married, took their honeymoon in St. Petersburg, and settled in Ullanlinna. She took the name Brofeldt rather than Aho because that was still her husband's legal name. Their home became a cultural meeting place that welcomed such notables as Jean Sibelius, Pekka Halonen, Arvid Järnefelt, Werner Söderhjelm. Albert Edelfelt, Axel Gallén and Eero Järnefelt. She was occasionally criticized for "masculine" habits such as smoking a pipe and wearing trousers. They also travelled about extensively until she became pregnant, then bought a home in Hausjärvi.

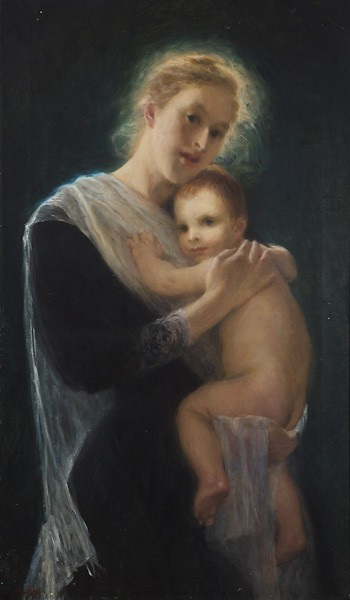
Self-Portrait, 1890

Their first child, Heikki (who would later become a filmmaker) was born in 1895. Venny's younger sister, Mathilda "Tilly" came to help with the housekeeping and Venny's recovery. But, soon, it became clear that a relationship was developing between her and Juhani. In 1896, Venny went to Berlin to study new methods in wallpaper design and was in no hurry to return, as she trusted them. Eventually though, it became a crisis and Juhani took a trip to Paris to let the situation settle down. Tilly went to Switzerland "for her health". Juhani joined her there, but had already decided to continue his marriage. In 1900, their second son Antti, who would also become a writer, was born. The triangle continued until 1902, when Tilly gave birth to Juhani's son, Björn Soldan. Juhani set them up in Järvenpää and visited frequently. She set up a small nursing home to support herself. Apparently none of this was known to the rest of their family and friends until Antti published his autobiography in 1951.

To add to their difficulties, in 1903 the Russian Governor-General, Nikolay Bobrikov had Juhani placed on the blacklist after his brother, Pekka, ran afoul of the censorship laws and had to flee the country. Facing the possibility of being sent to Siberia, they decided to leave Finland and, from 1903 to 1904, lived first in Tyrolia, then Venice and Florence. They returned to Helsinki after Bobrikov was assassinated. In 1907, Juhani had his name legally changed to Aho as a patriotic gesture. Venny chose to retain her hyphenated name.

In 1910, she and Juhani collaborated on a picture book for children. He began spending much of his time in Tuscany while she remained in Helsinki. After his death in 1921, she began travelling, often as a representative of his sons' photography and filmmaking company, Aho & Soldan.

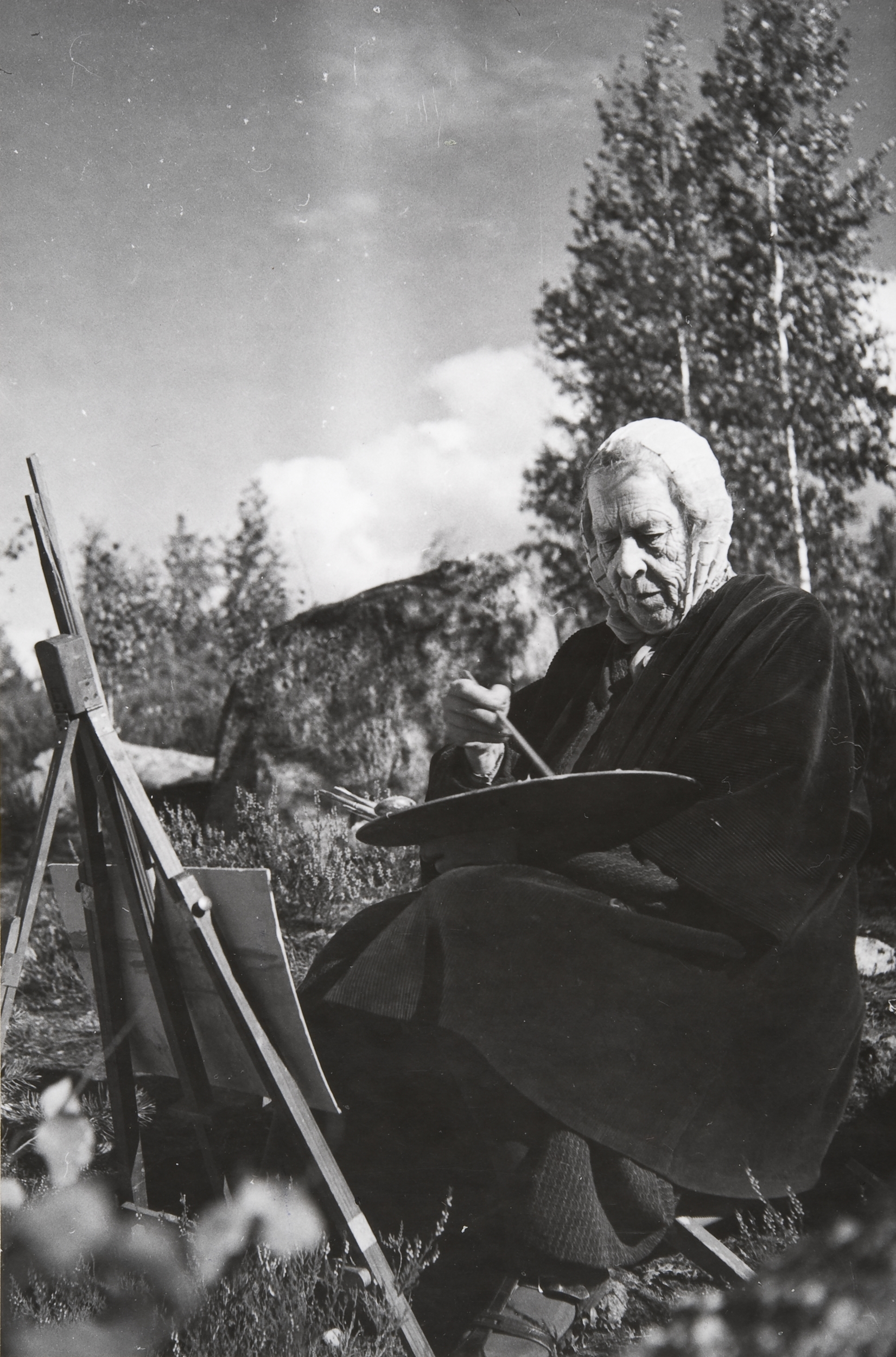
Painting outdoors in the 1930s

When the Lalluka Artists' Home was completed in 1933, she became its honorary spokesperson. During the Winter War, she moved to a cottage in Lohja, where she died in 1945. Just before her death, she burned all the correspondence between Juhani and Tilly, who had died in 1931. She also expressed the wish to be buried at the Hietaniemi Cemetery, with her family, rather than next to her husband, as would be customary.

== Selected paintings ==
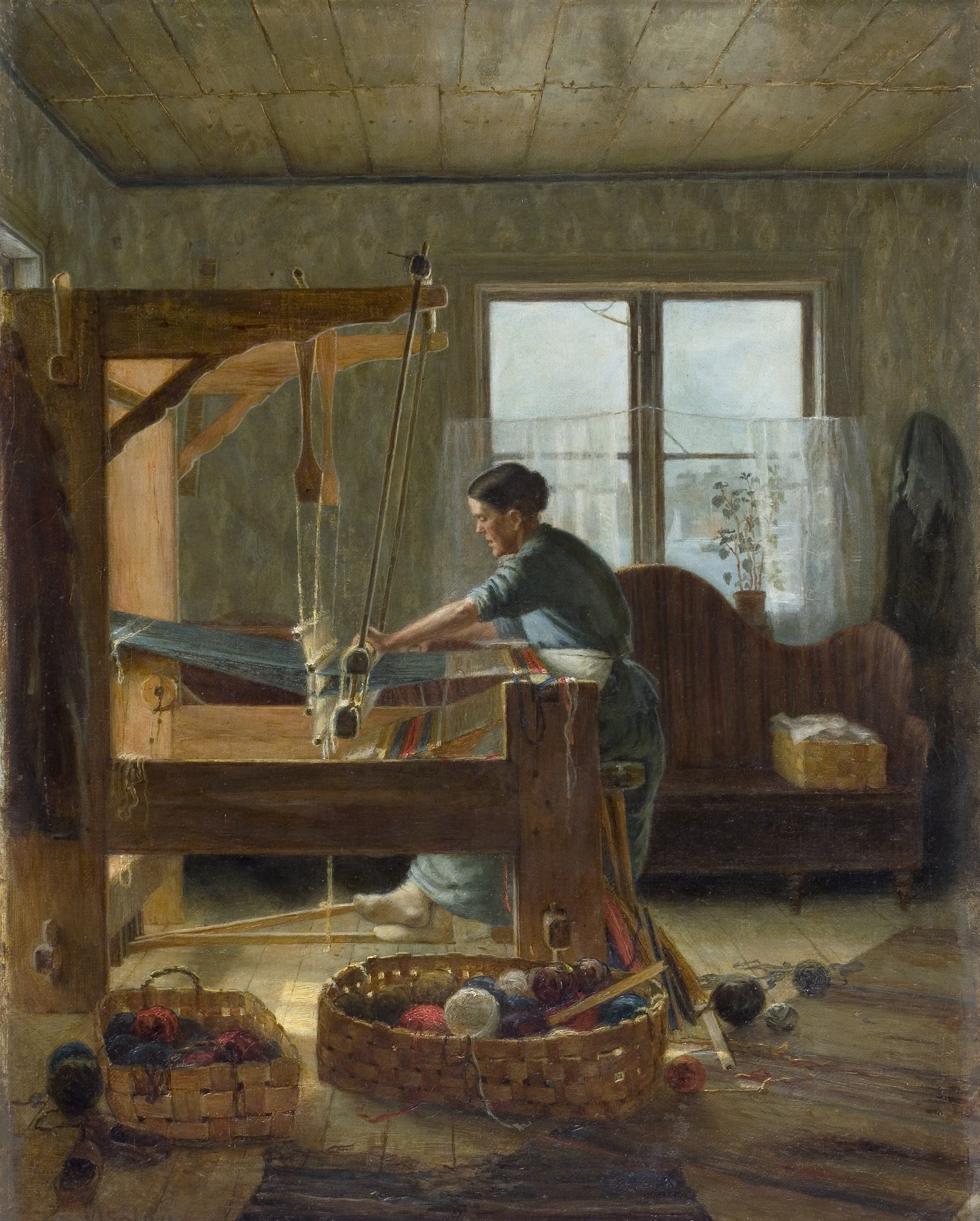
Weaver, 1883–84

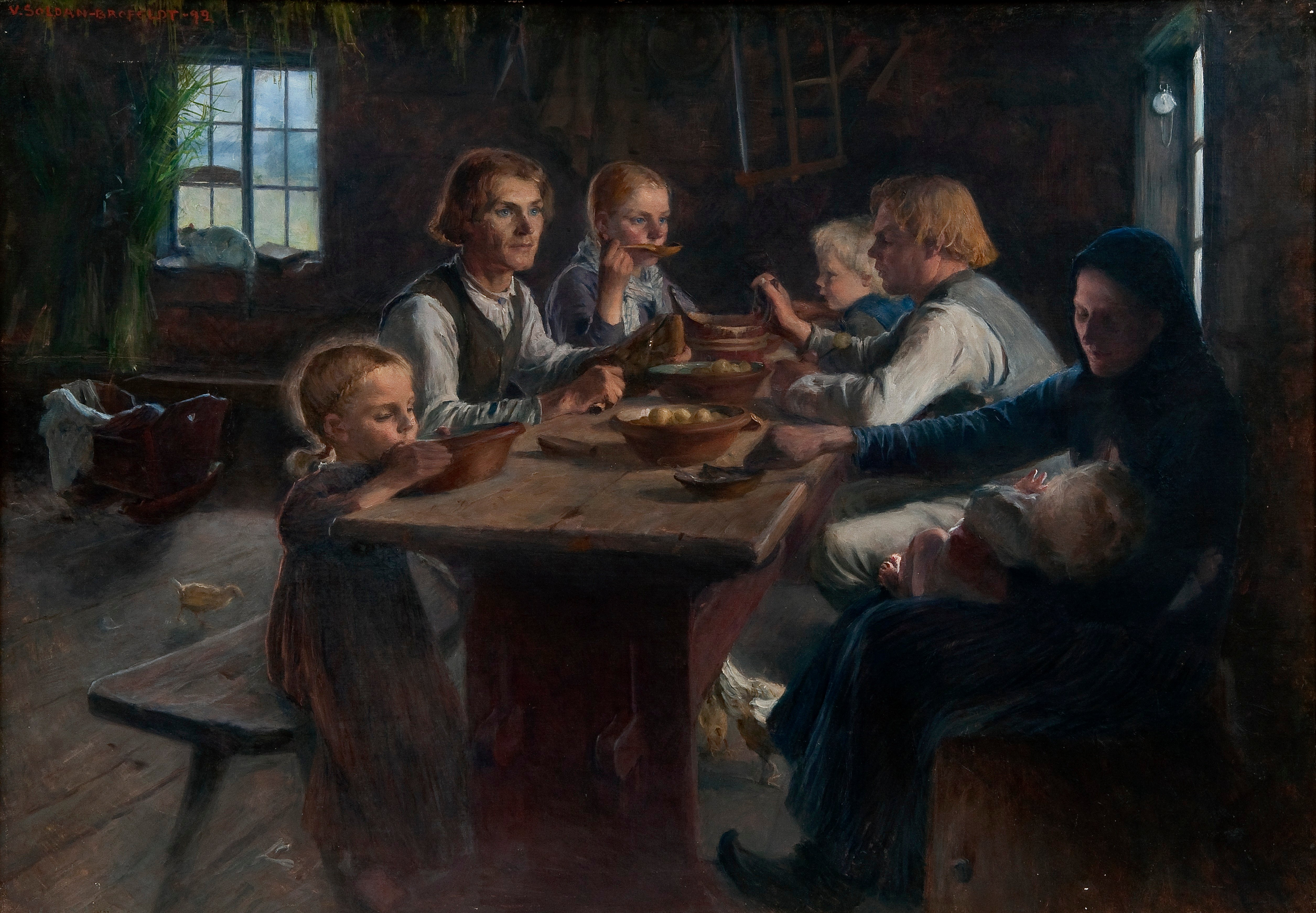
Supper at a Finnish farmhouse, 1892

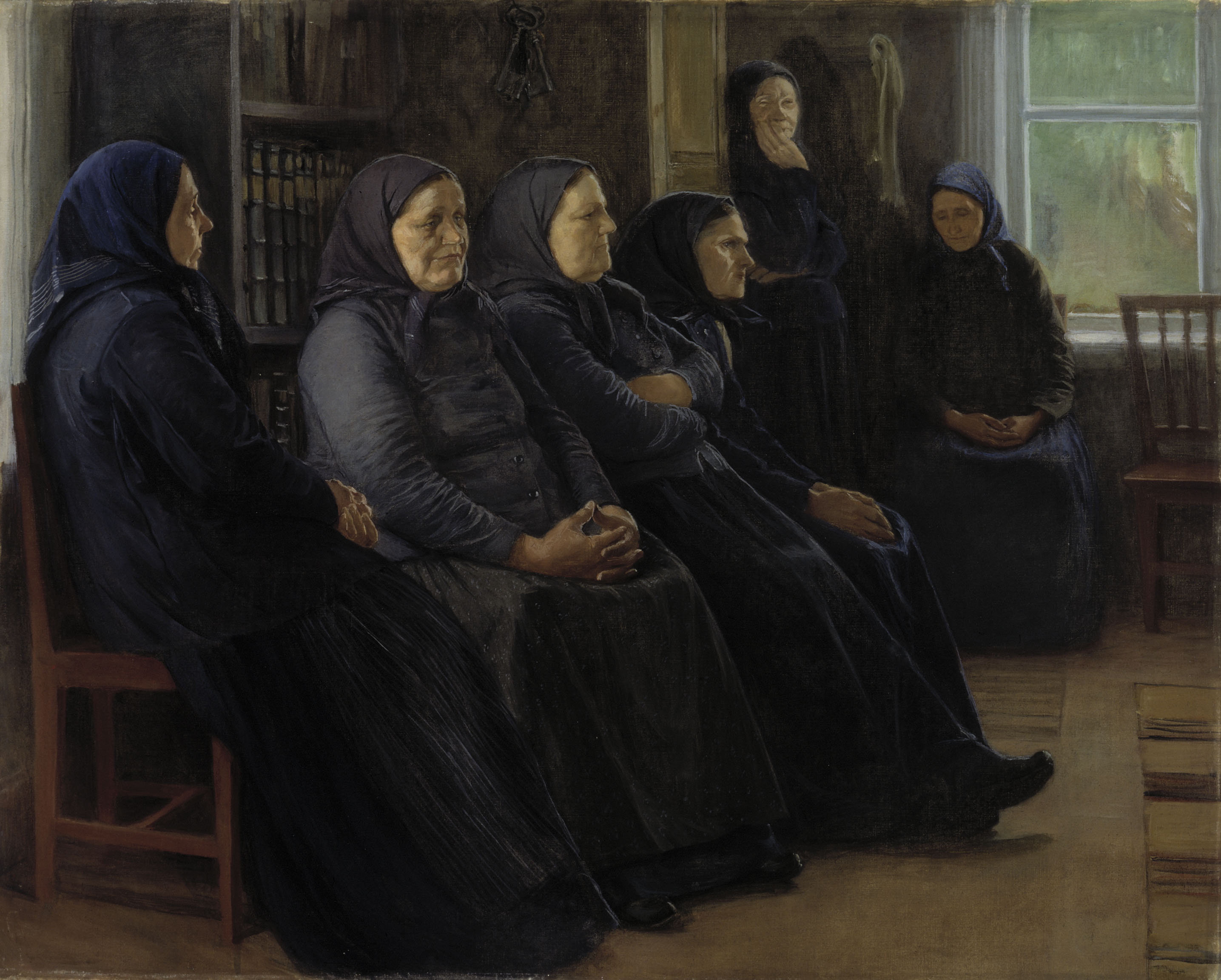
The Pietists, 1898

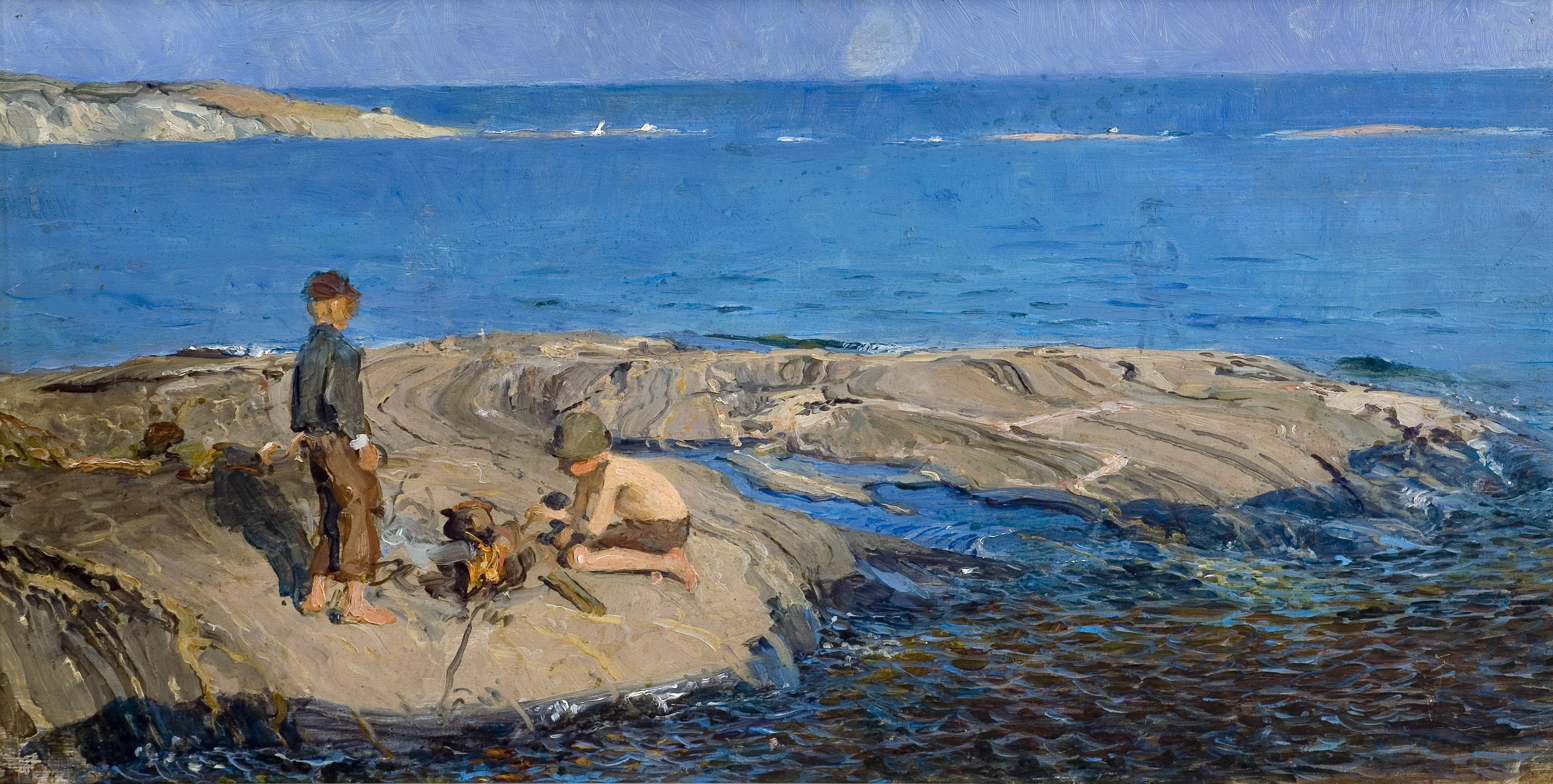
Boys on a Skerry, 1898

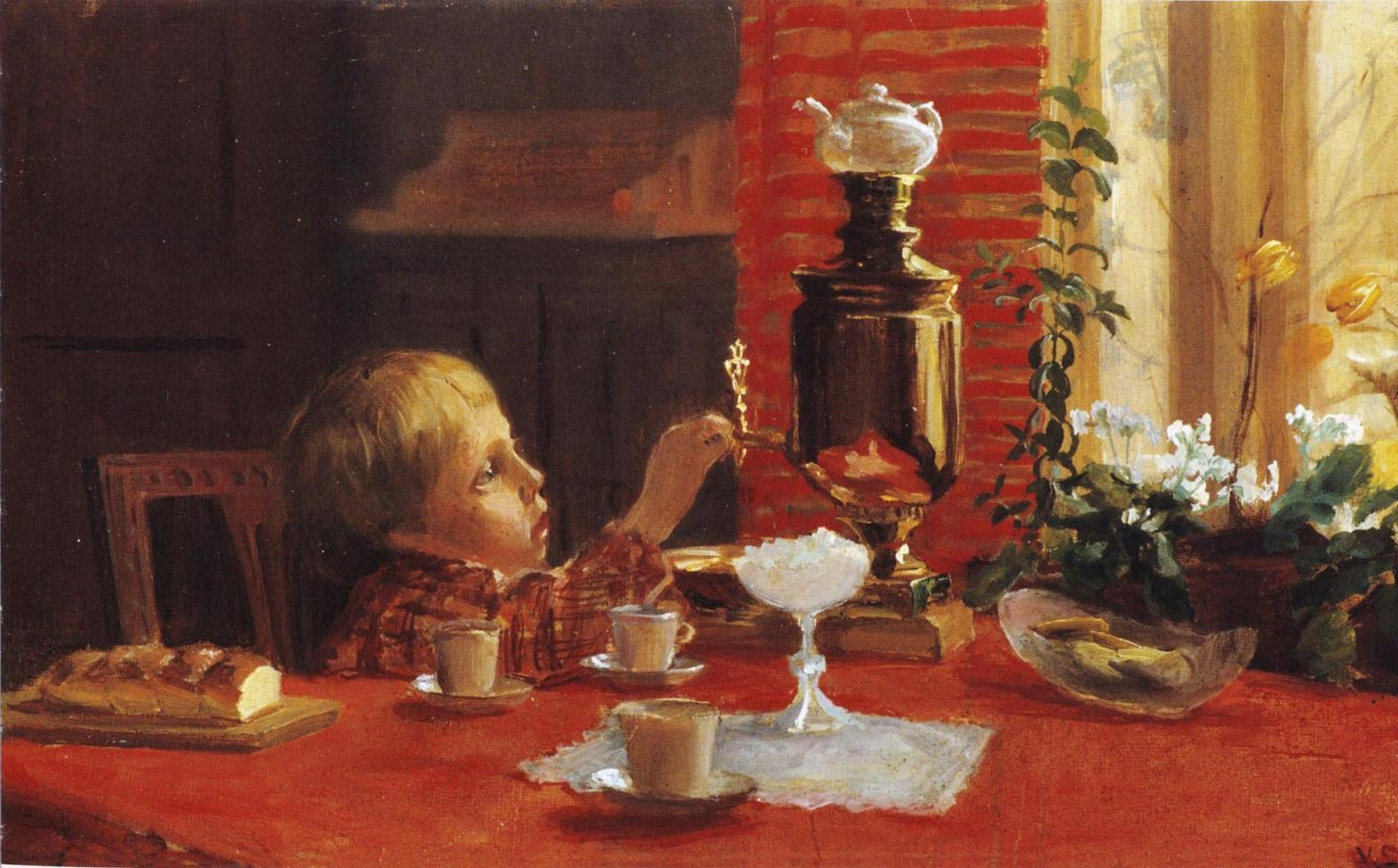
Little Engineer, 1898

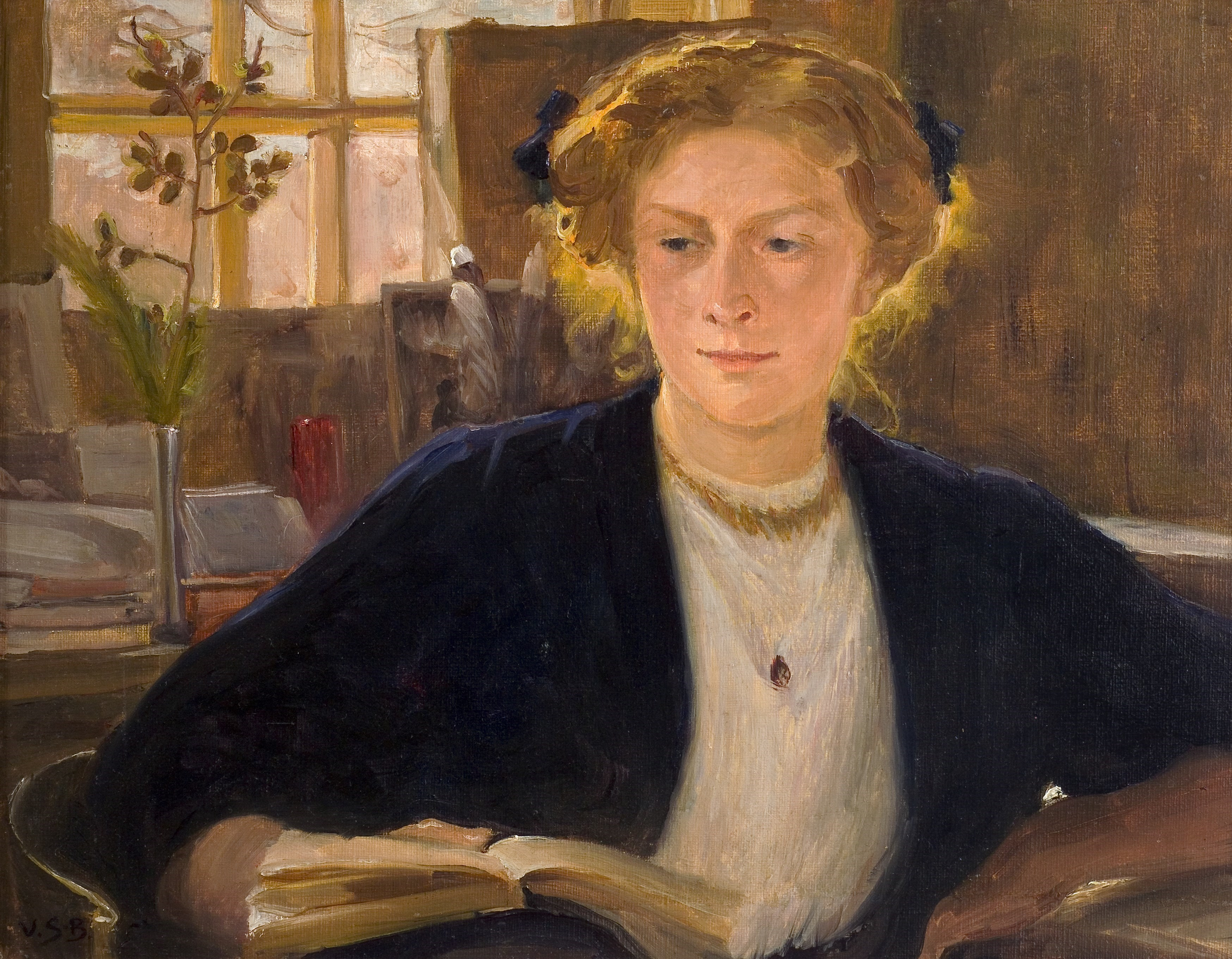
In the atelier of Ahola (Miss Selin), 1895–1900

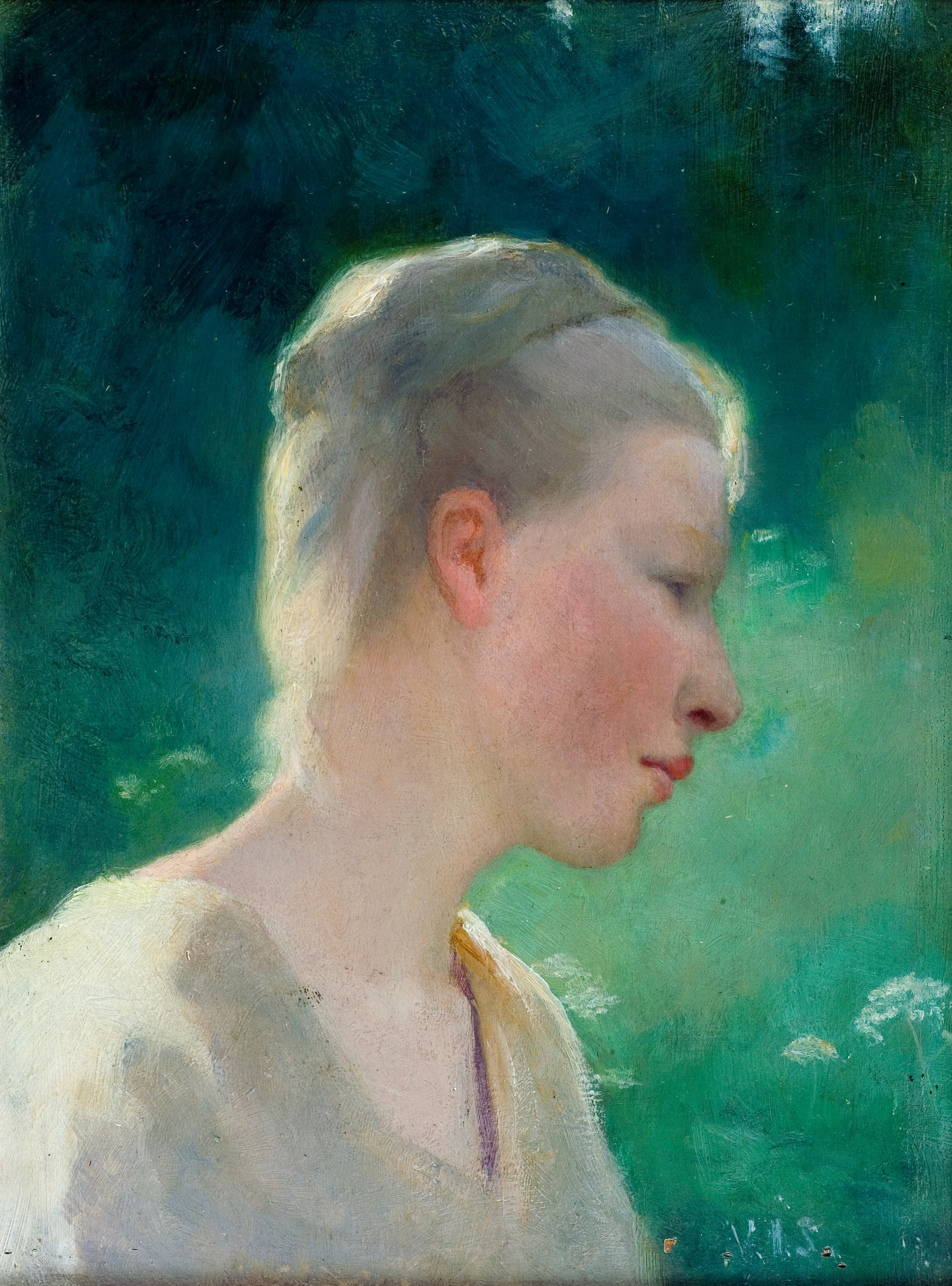
Young Woman, late 1800s

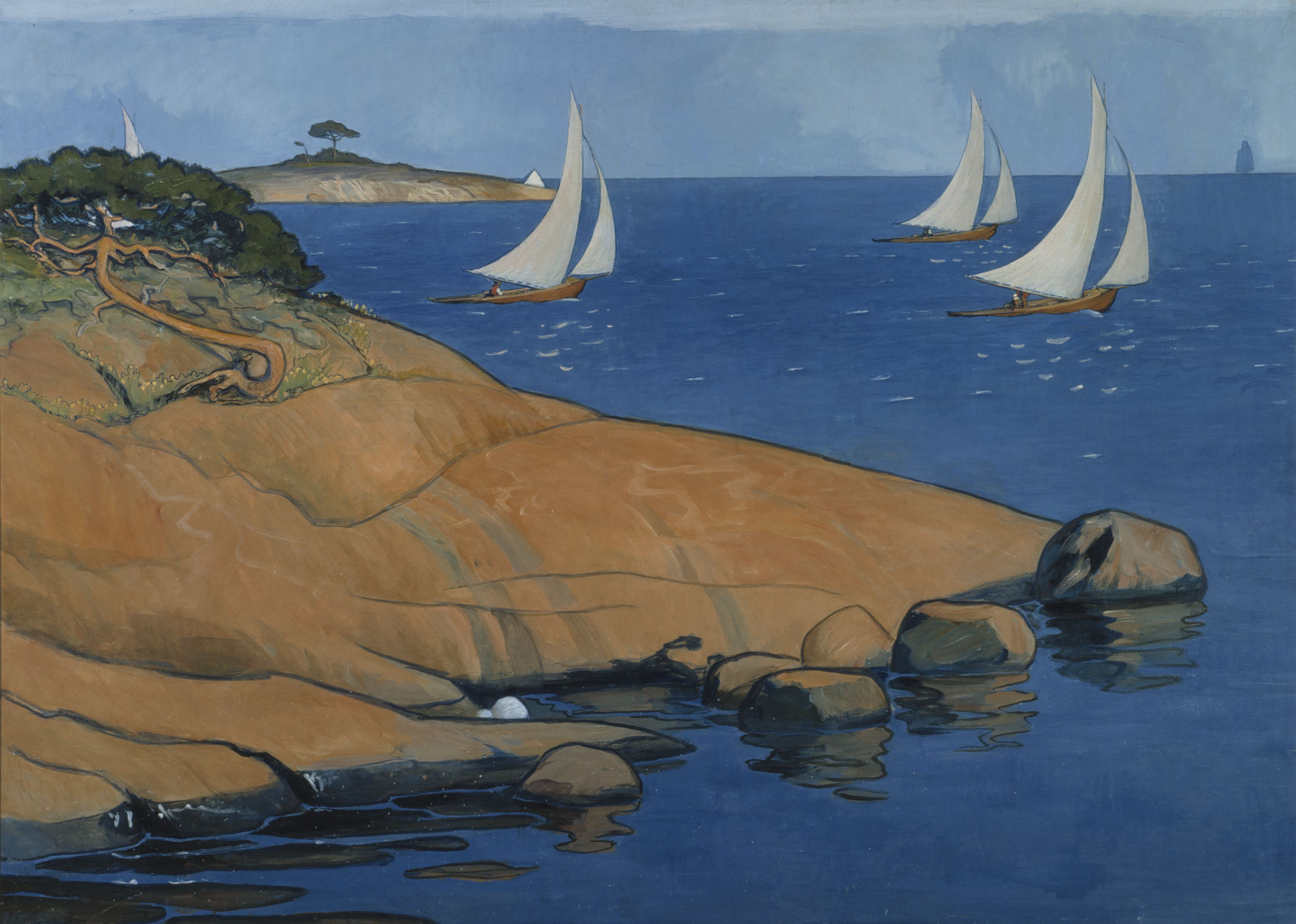
Archipelago Landscape, 1900

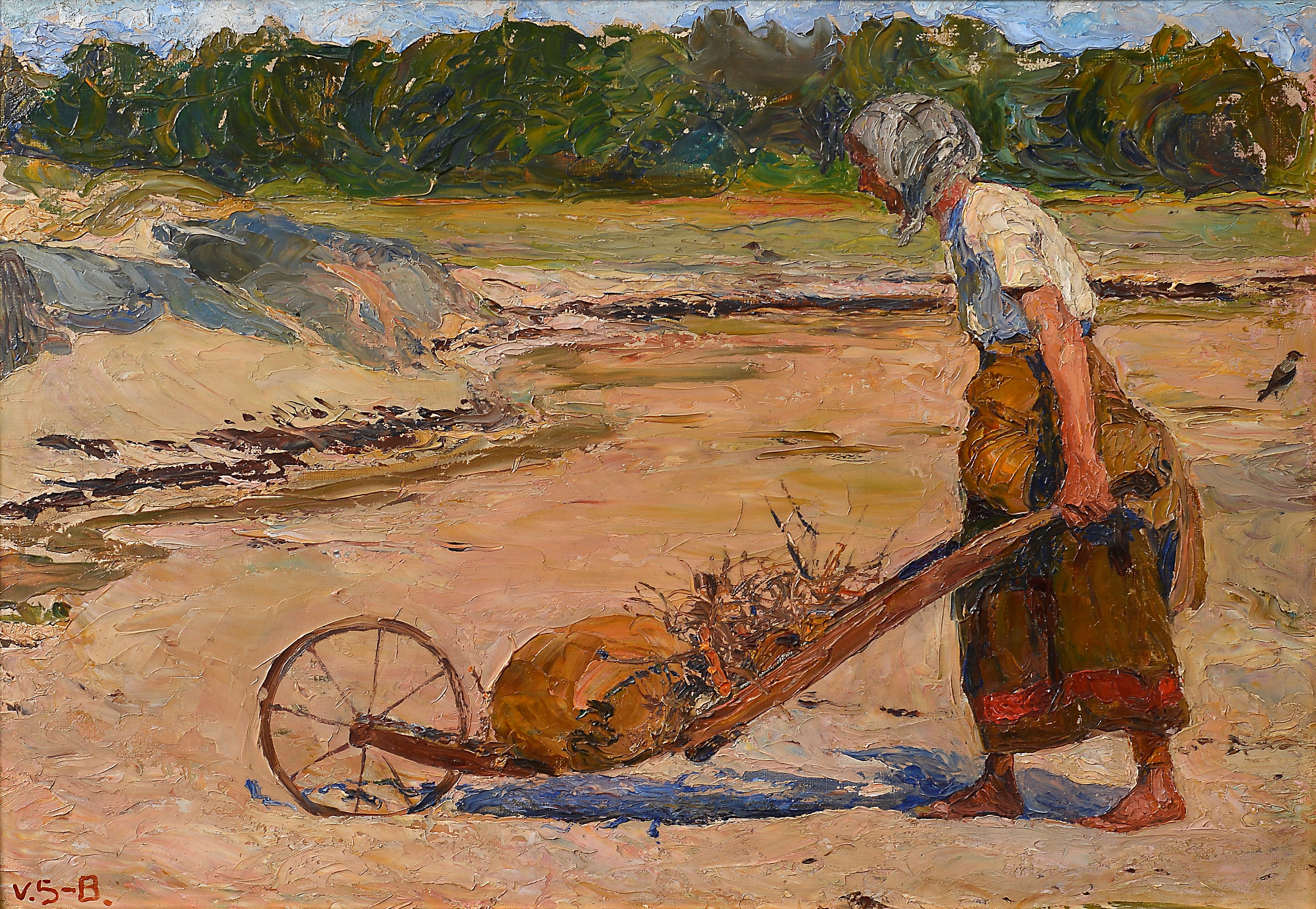
Woman Pushing a Cart, 1900s

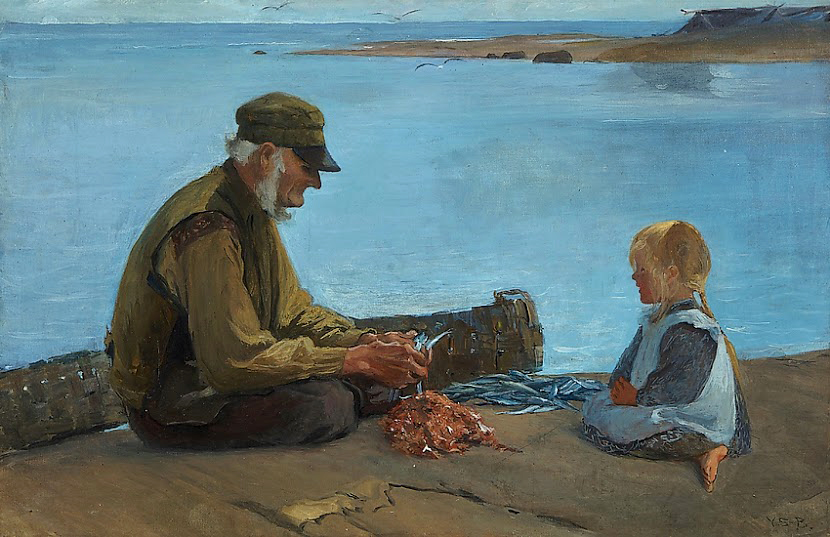
Grandfather's Teachings, 1902

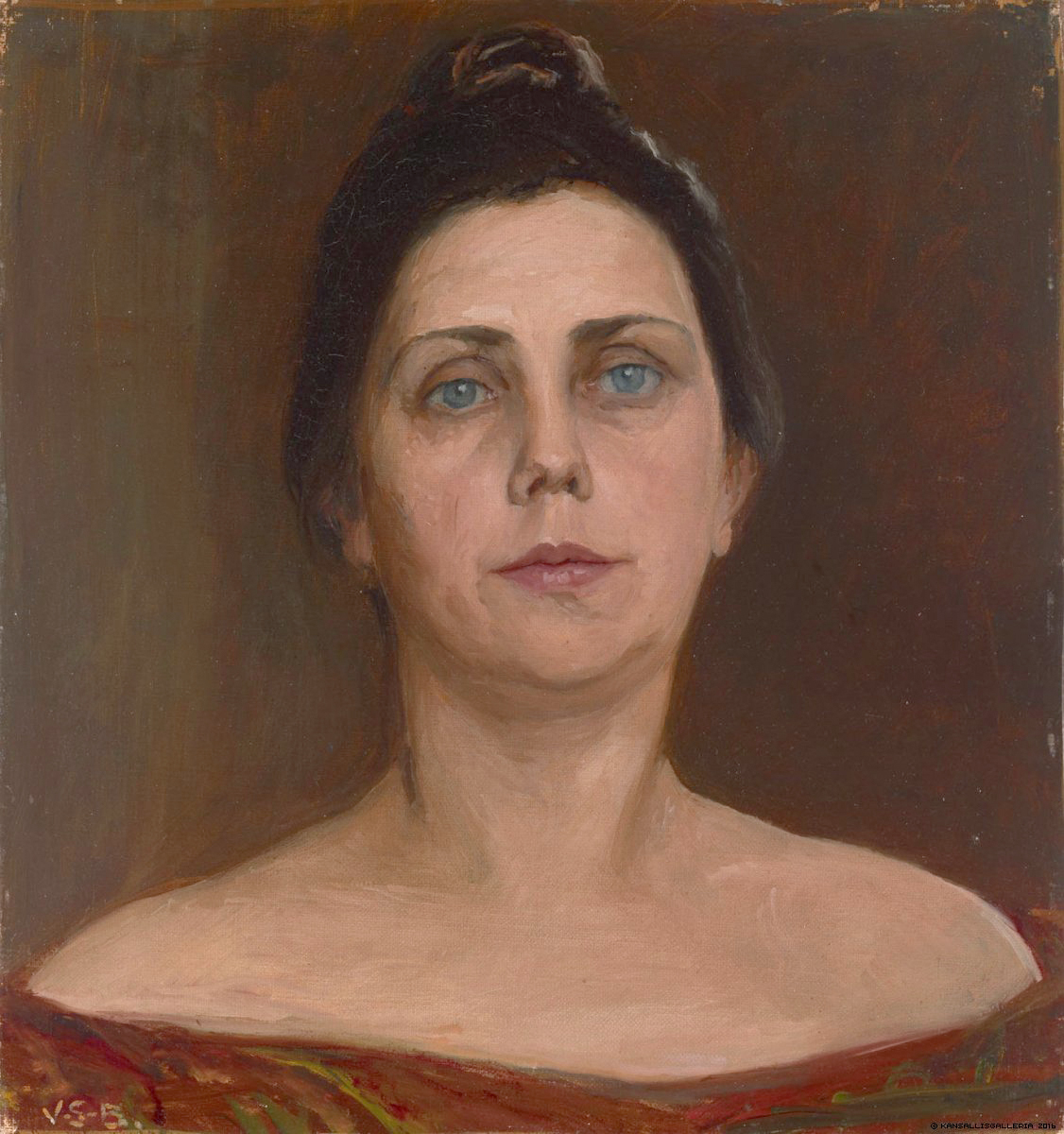
Portrait of Sigrid af Forselles, 1902

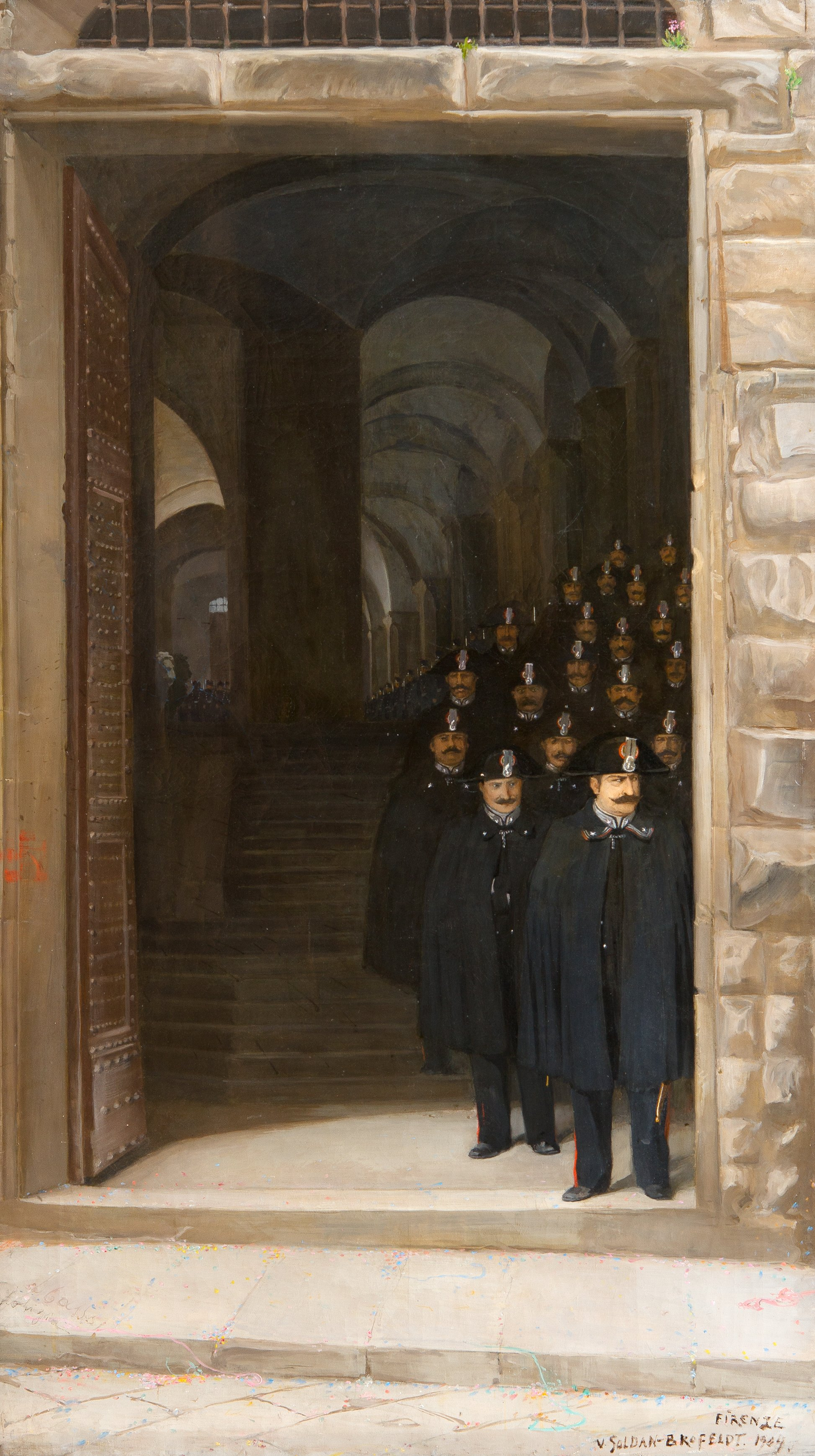
A Florentine Police Choir, 1904

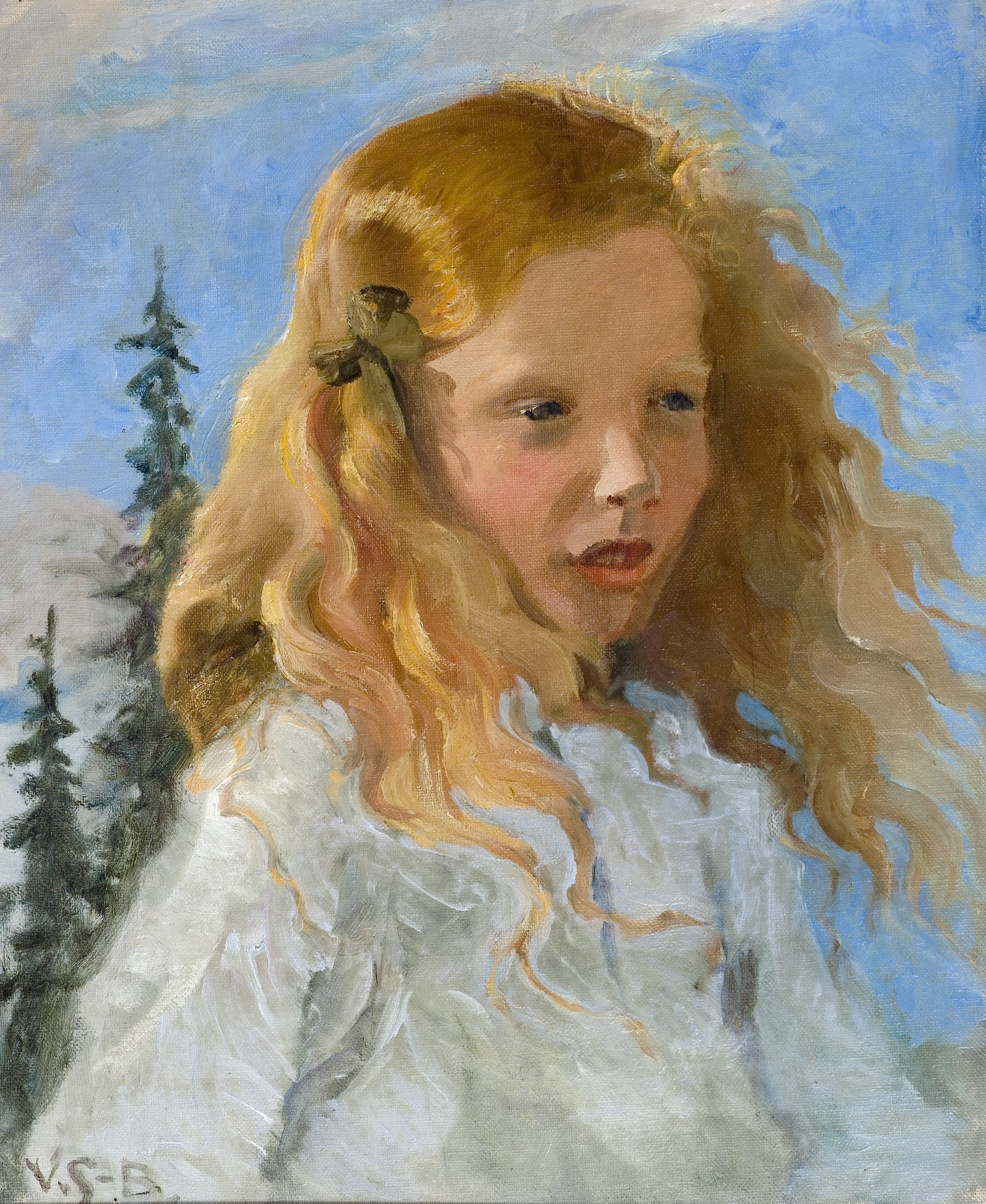
Antti, 1907

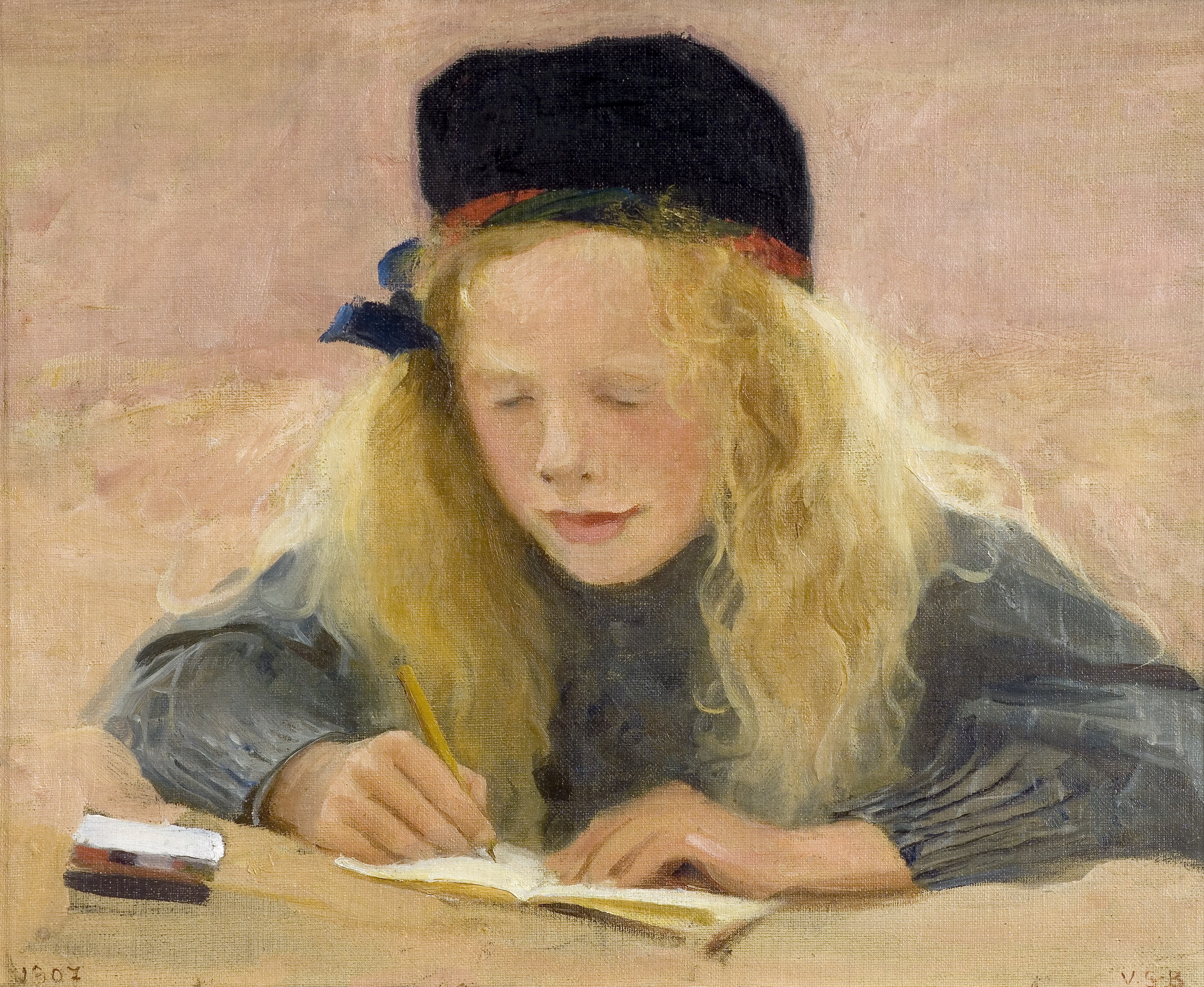
Antti Drawing on Sand, 1907

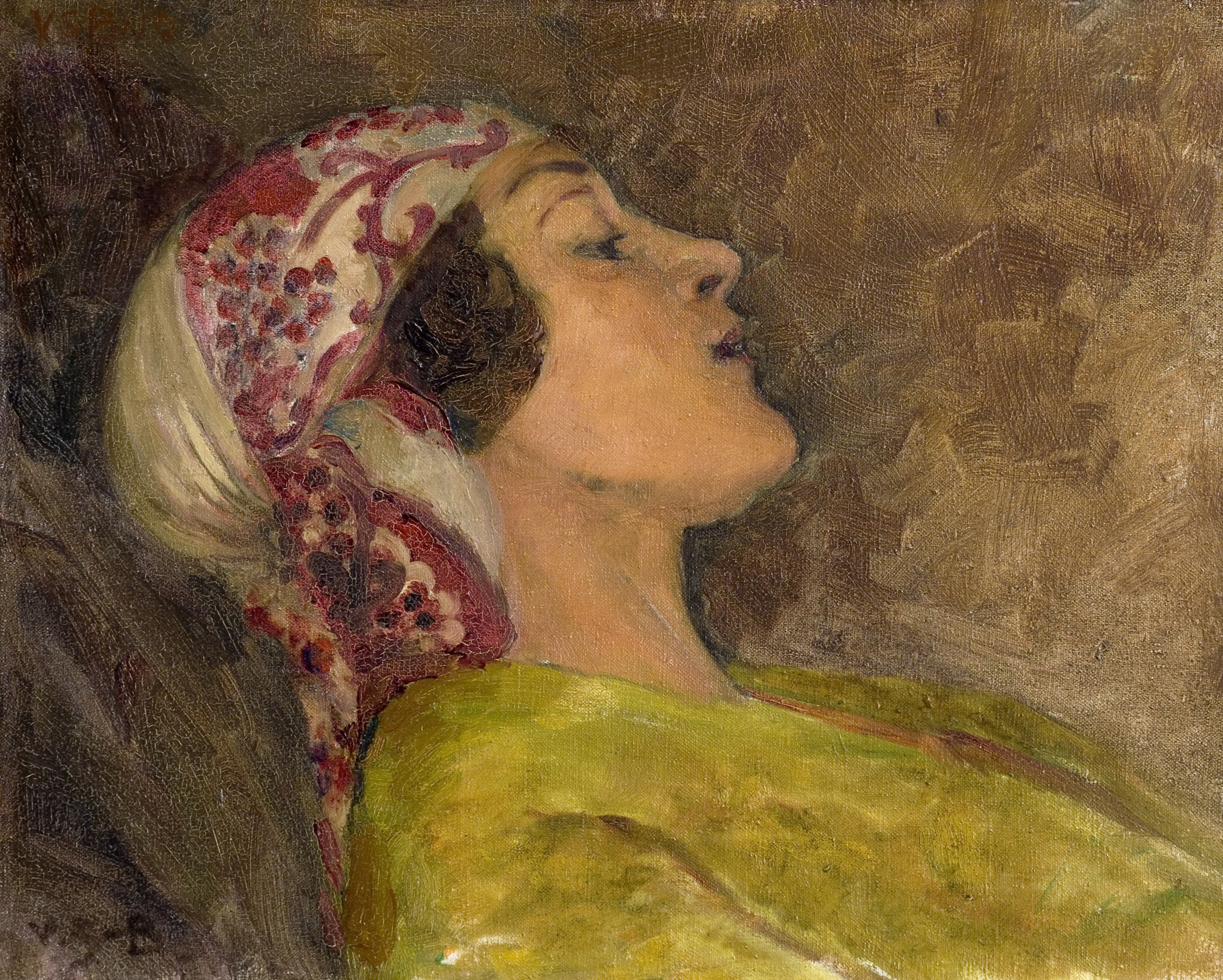
Maggie, 1916

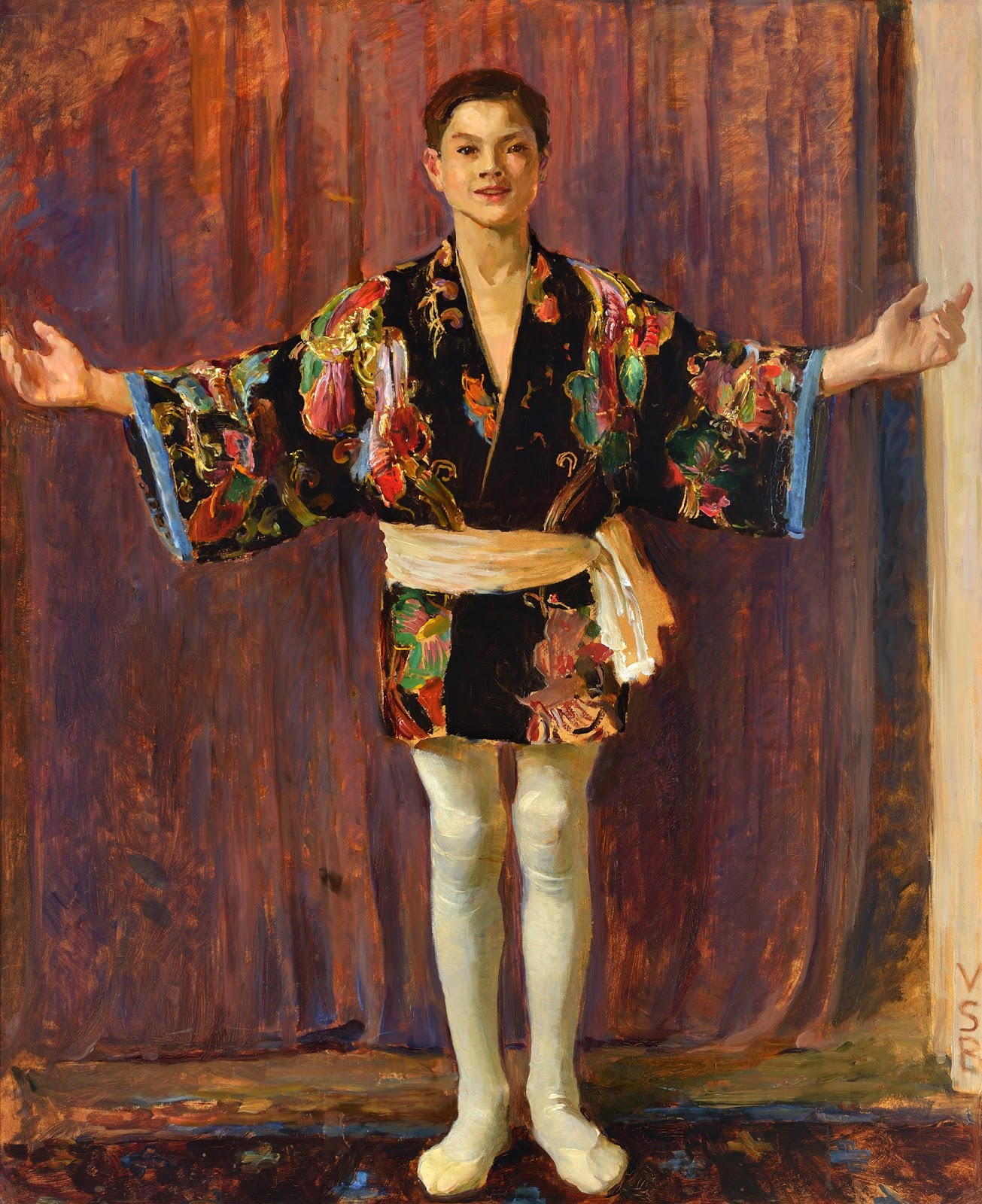
Boy in a Kimono, 1910s

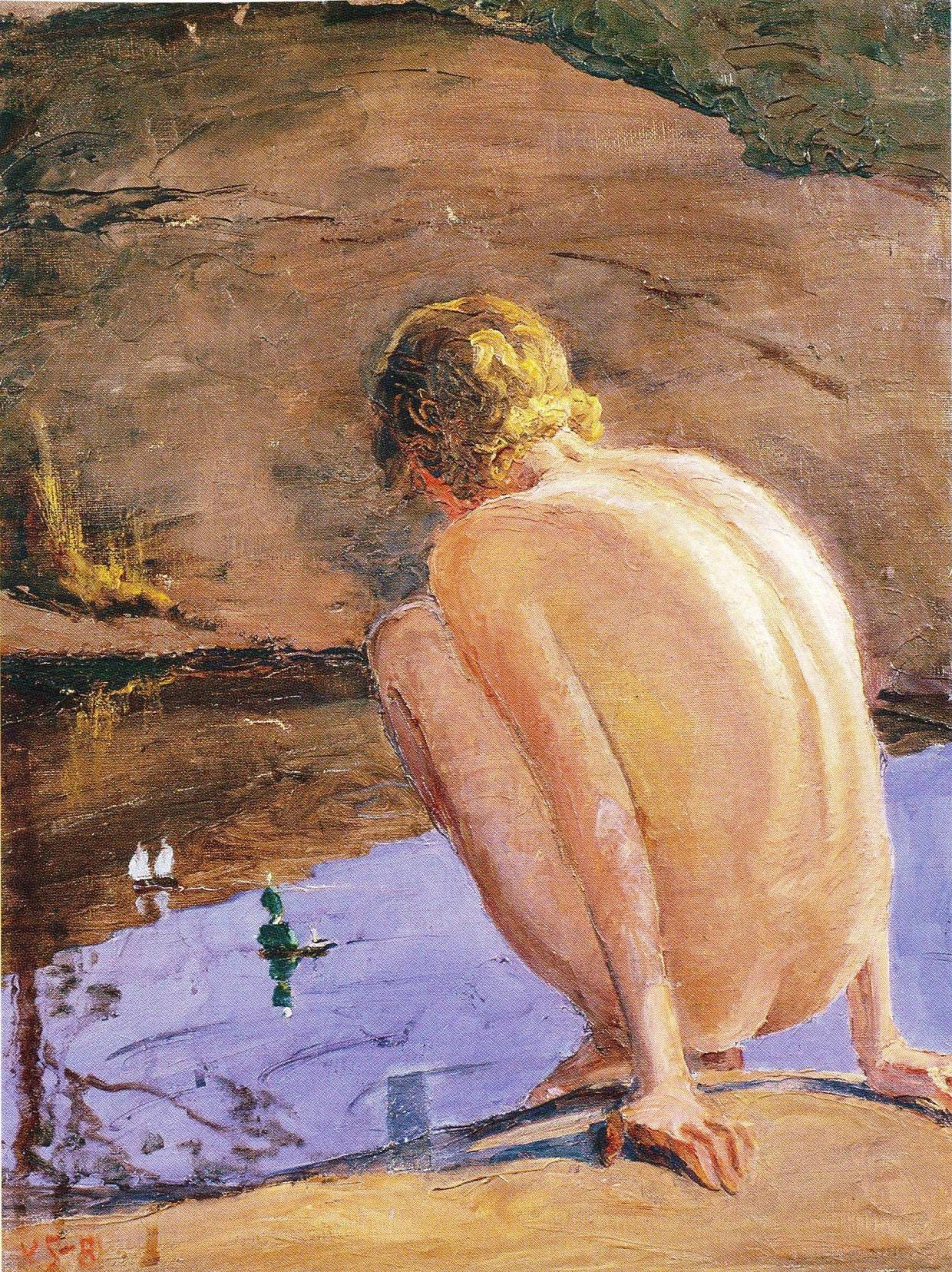
Boy Playing with a Puddle, 1914

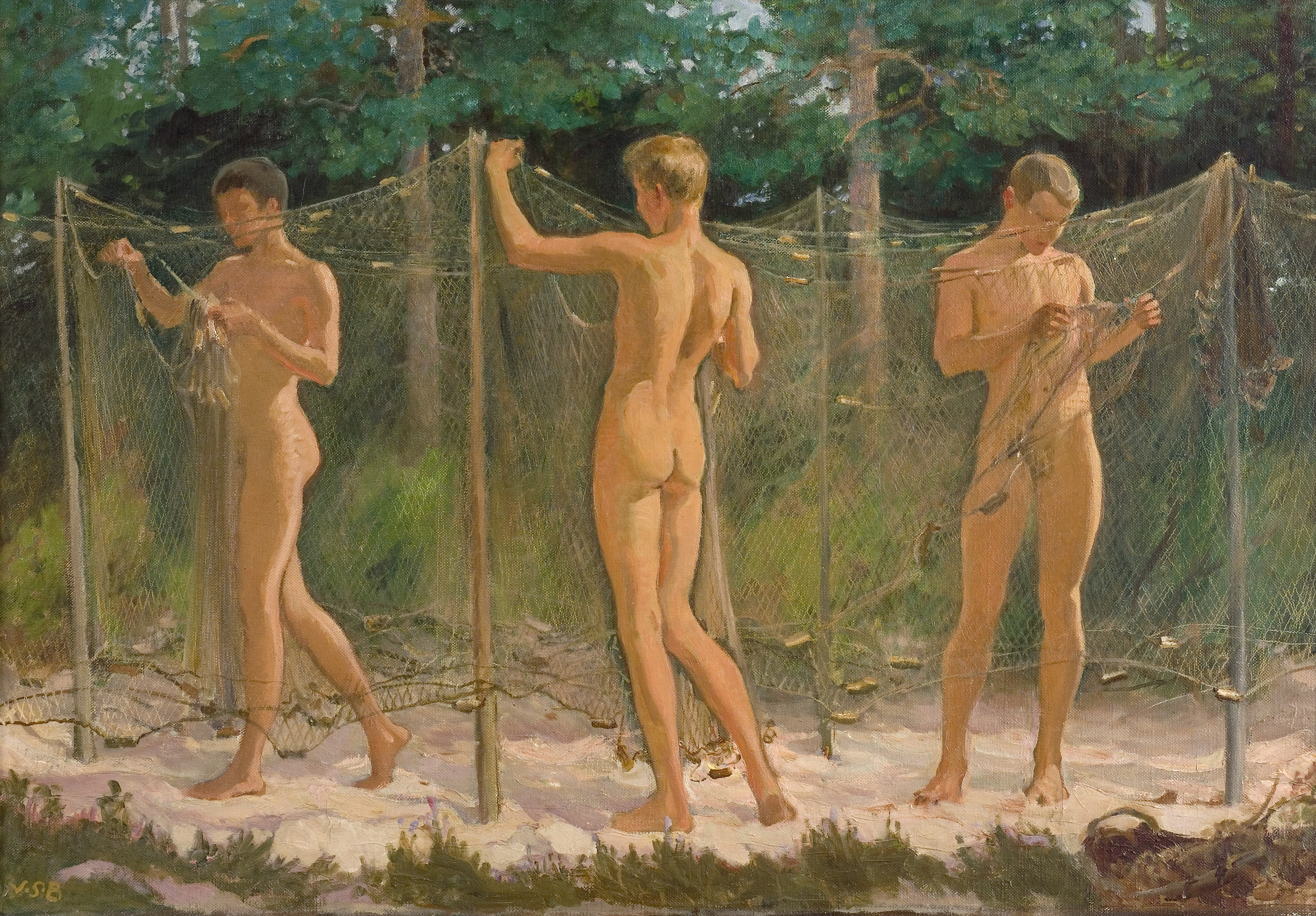
Boys Gathering a Fishing Net, 1915–19

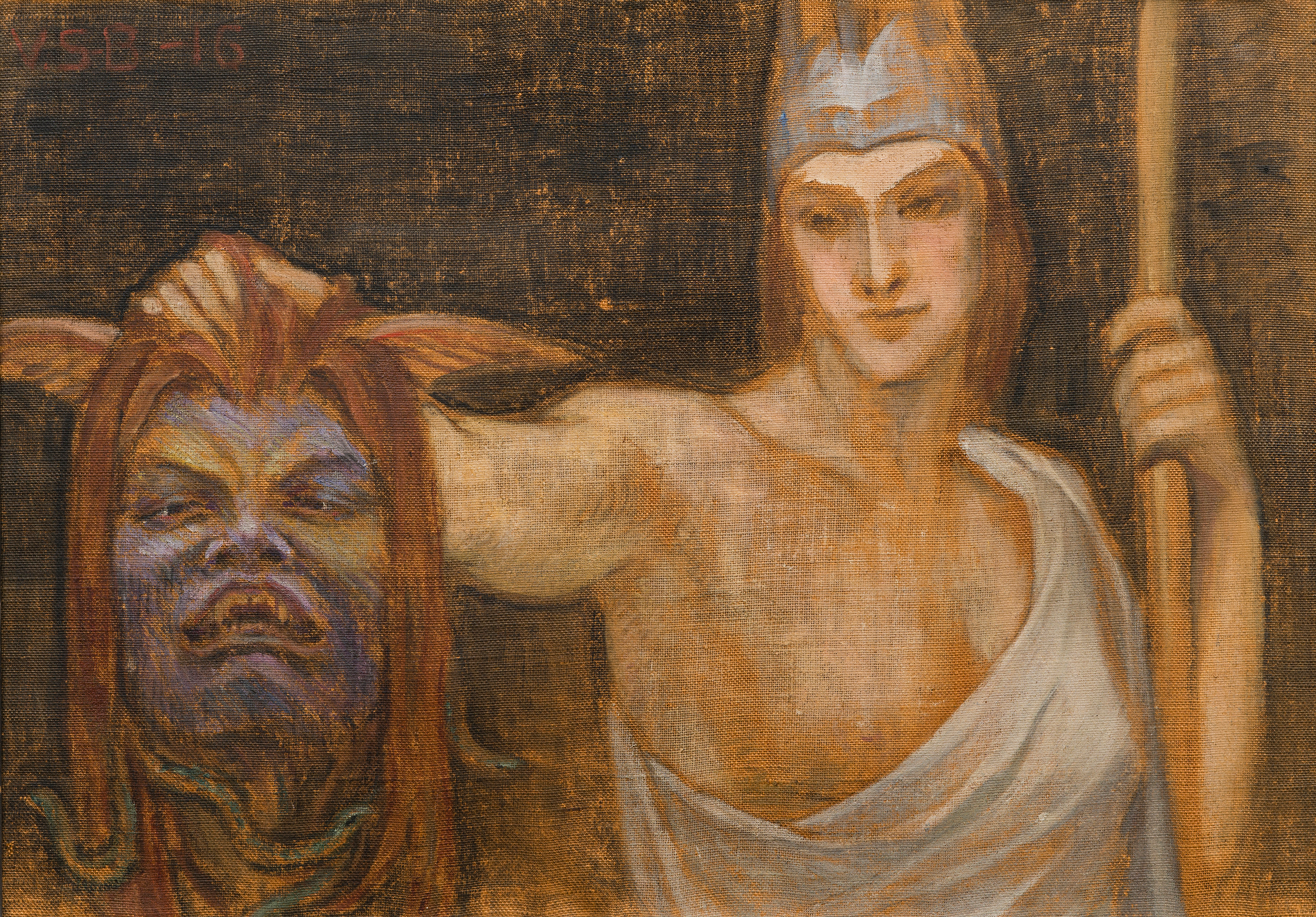
Pallas Athene, 1916

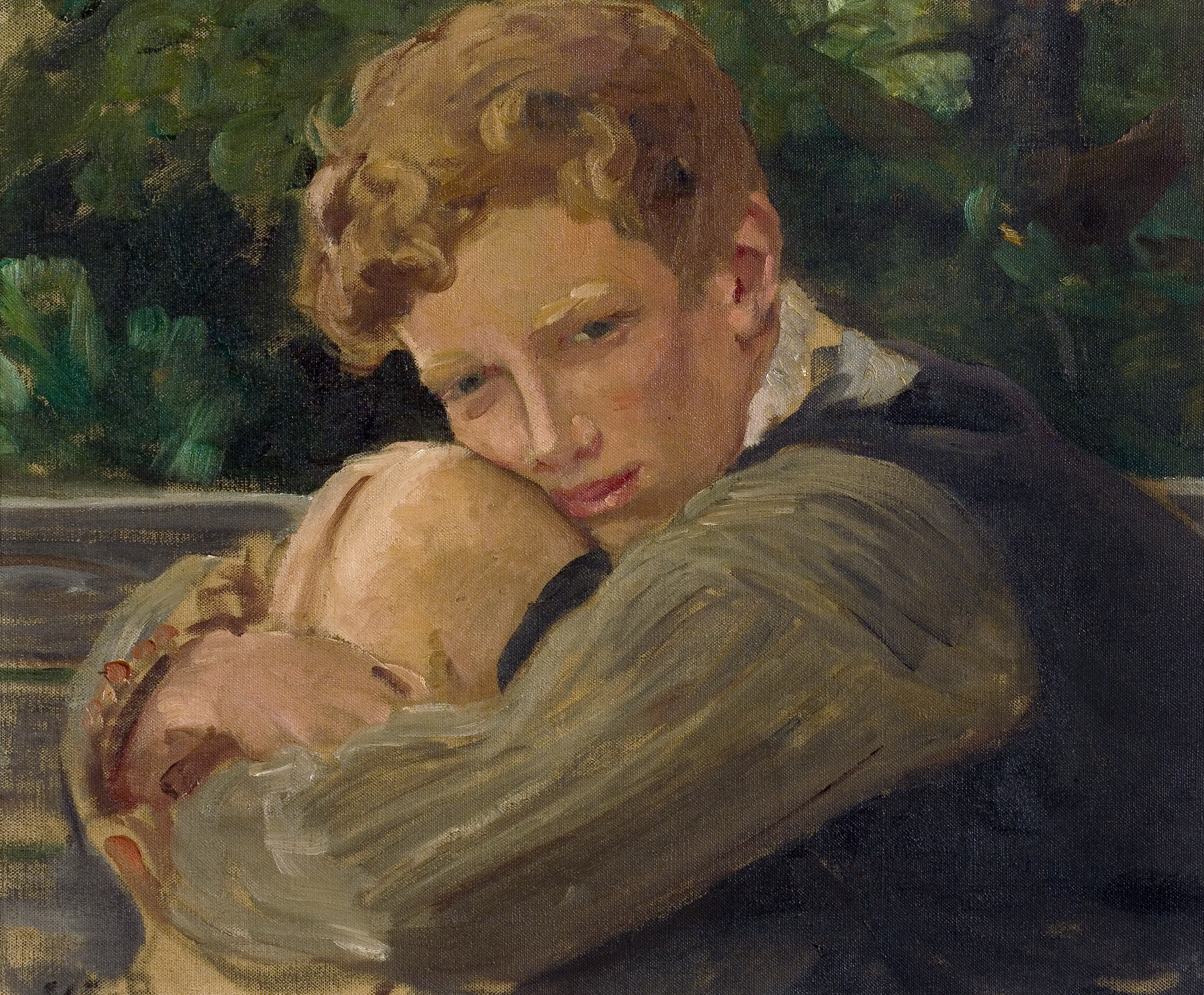
Antti, c. 1917

== See also ==
- Golden Age of Finnish Art
- Finnish art

== Sources ==
- Kaija Valkonen, Elina Koivunen: Suurin on rakkaus (Love is Greatest), WSOY, 1997, ISBN 951-0-21783-2
- Riitta Konttinen: Boheemielämä – Venny Soldan-Brofeldtin taiteilijantie, Otava, 1996, ISBN 951-1-13043-9
