= Arthur af Forselles =

Arthur Edvard af Forselles (11 February 1864, Lammi – 27 July 1953, Kannus) was a Finnish physician and politician. He was a member of the Diet of Finland in 1897, 1899 and from 1905 to 1906 and of the Parliament of Finland from 1919 to 1922, representing the Swedish People's Party of Finland (SFP). His sister was the sculptor Sigrid af Forselles.
