= Sigrid af Forselles =

Finnish sculptor

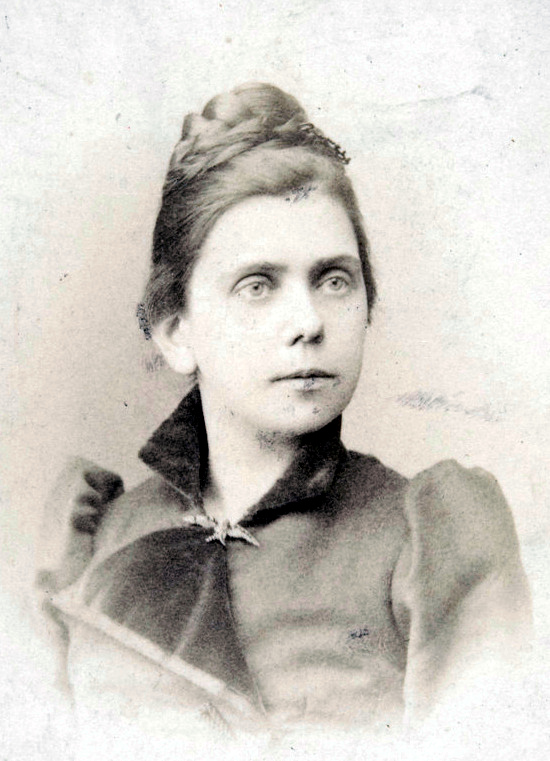
- Sigrid af Forselles, c. late 1880s
- Born: Sigrid Maria Rosina af Forselles; 4 May 1860; Lammi, Grand Duchy of Finland
- Died: 16 January 1935 (aged 74); Florence, Italy
- Known for: Sculpture

Sigrid af Forselles (1860—1935) was a Finnish sculptor, notable for being one of the first professional female sculptors of the country.

== Early life and education ==
Sigrid af Forselles was born to an upper-class family of minor nobility; her father was the engineer, inventor, retired Colonel, and Director-General of Metsähallitus, Alexander af Forselles, and her mother Emilie Sofie Jacquette née Waenerberg. Her younger brother was Arthur af Forselles, who later became a physician and politician.

She was first educated at a private German-language girls' school in Finland, followed by a year at a finishing school in Vevey in Switzerland, although she did not particularly excel at either.

Af Forselles began her art studies at the Drawing School of the Finnish Art Society (Suomen Taideyhdistyksen piirustuskoulu), now part of the Academy of Fine Arts, Helsinki, from 1876 to 1880. Her main interest already then was sculpture, but it was not formally taught in Finland at the time, so she studied drawing instead. After graduation, she moved into sculpture, training at first privately under the Finnish sculptor Robert Stigell, and later, from 1882 to 1886, in Paris with Auguste Rodin, Alfred Boucher, and others. From there she moved to Florence to continue her studies for another four years.

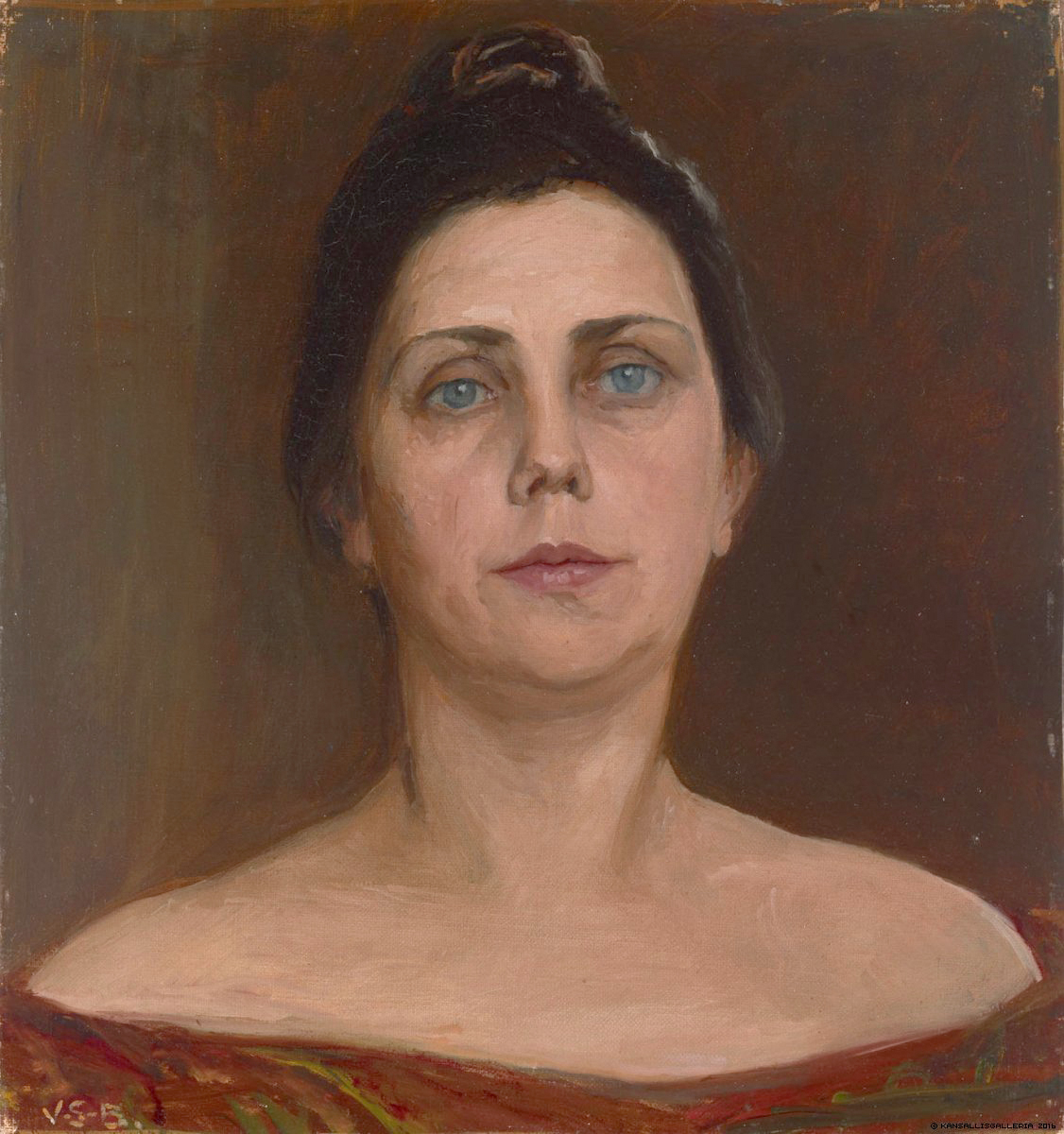
Portrait painting of Sigrid af Forselles, by Venny Soldan-Brofeldt, c. 1902; on display at the Finnish National Gallery

== Career ==
Af Forselles gave her debut exhibition in Finland in 1884, but afterwards exhibited mostly abroad. Finland, in the late 19th century, did not provide enough professional opportunities for a female sculptor, and therefore af Forselles worked for most of her professional life elsewhere, mostly in Paris and Florence. From c. 1911 onwards she mainly resided in the latter. She had planned an extensive tour of Finland, possibly even to move back to her home country in her later years, but her health deteriorated and she died in Florence without returning to Finland.

Although af Forselles' works comprise numerous small and intimate works, what makes her stand out from most other 19th-century women sculptors was her courage and confidence to tackle also large-scale projects.

Among her best-known creations is a thematic series of five massive reliefs depicting the history of mankind, titled 'The Development of the Human Soul' (1887—1903), four of which are housed in the Kallio Church of Helsinki, and the fifth at Ateneum, one of the three museums of the Finnish National Gallery. It took 16 years to create, and is considered her magnum opus. Many of her other works also have a religious or spiritual theme.

Works by Sigrid af Forselles
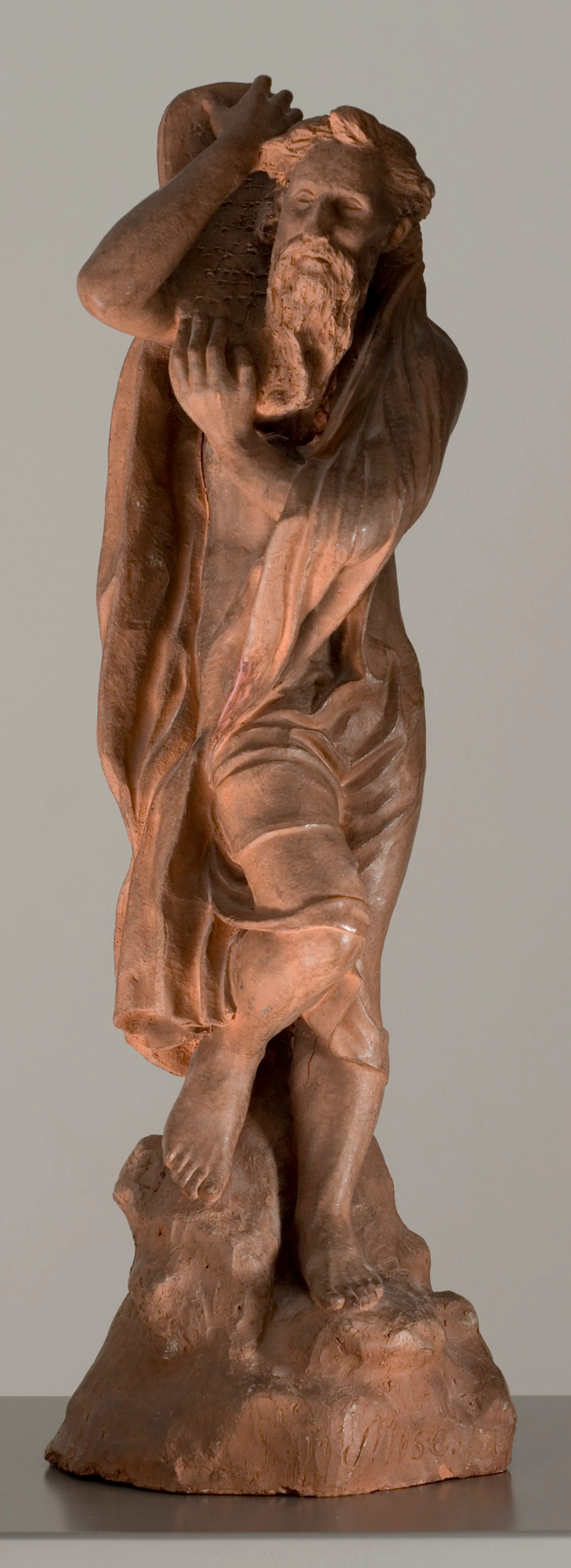
Moses (1898), terracotta

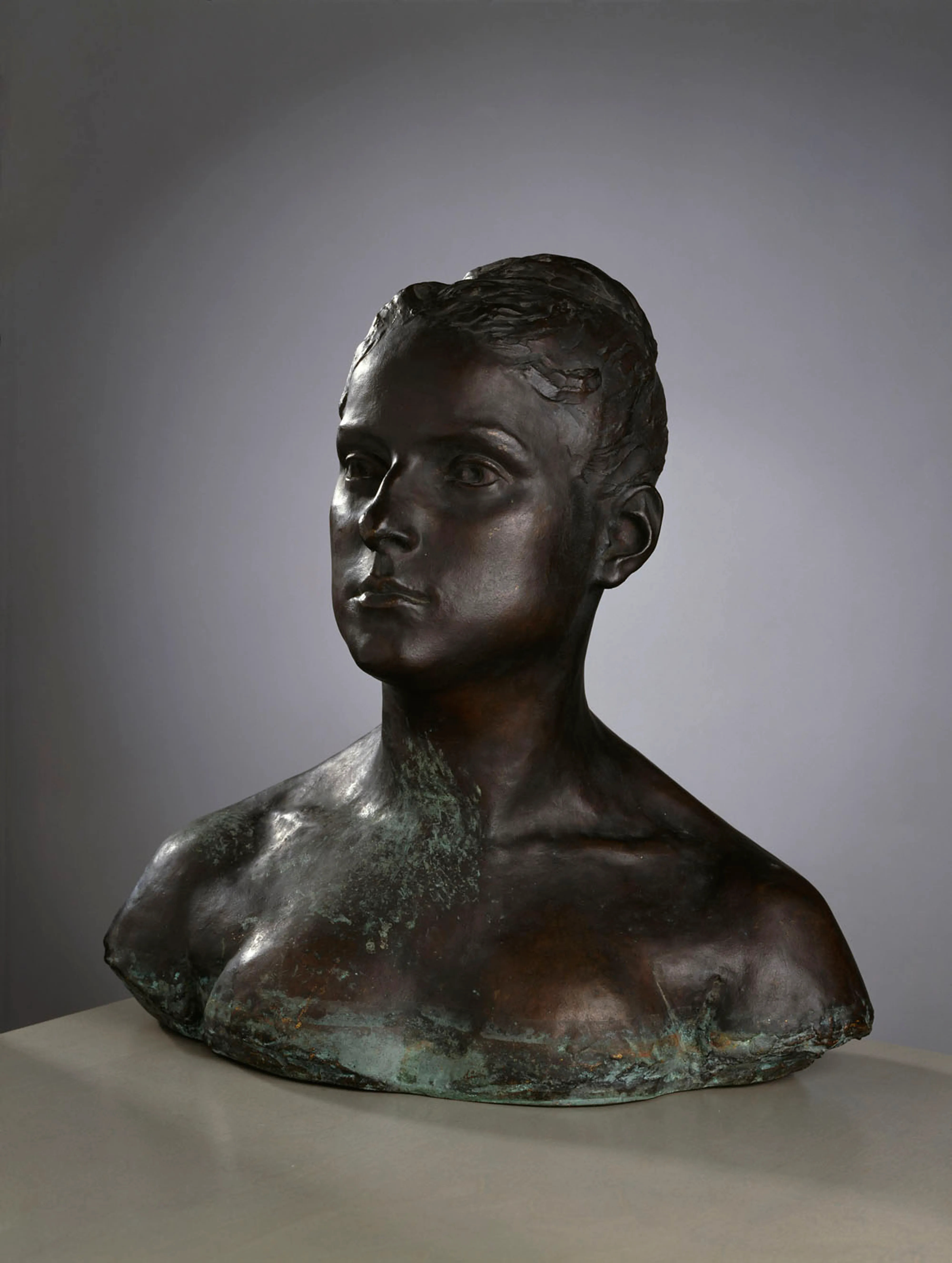
Youth (1880s), bronze

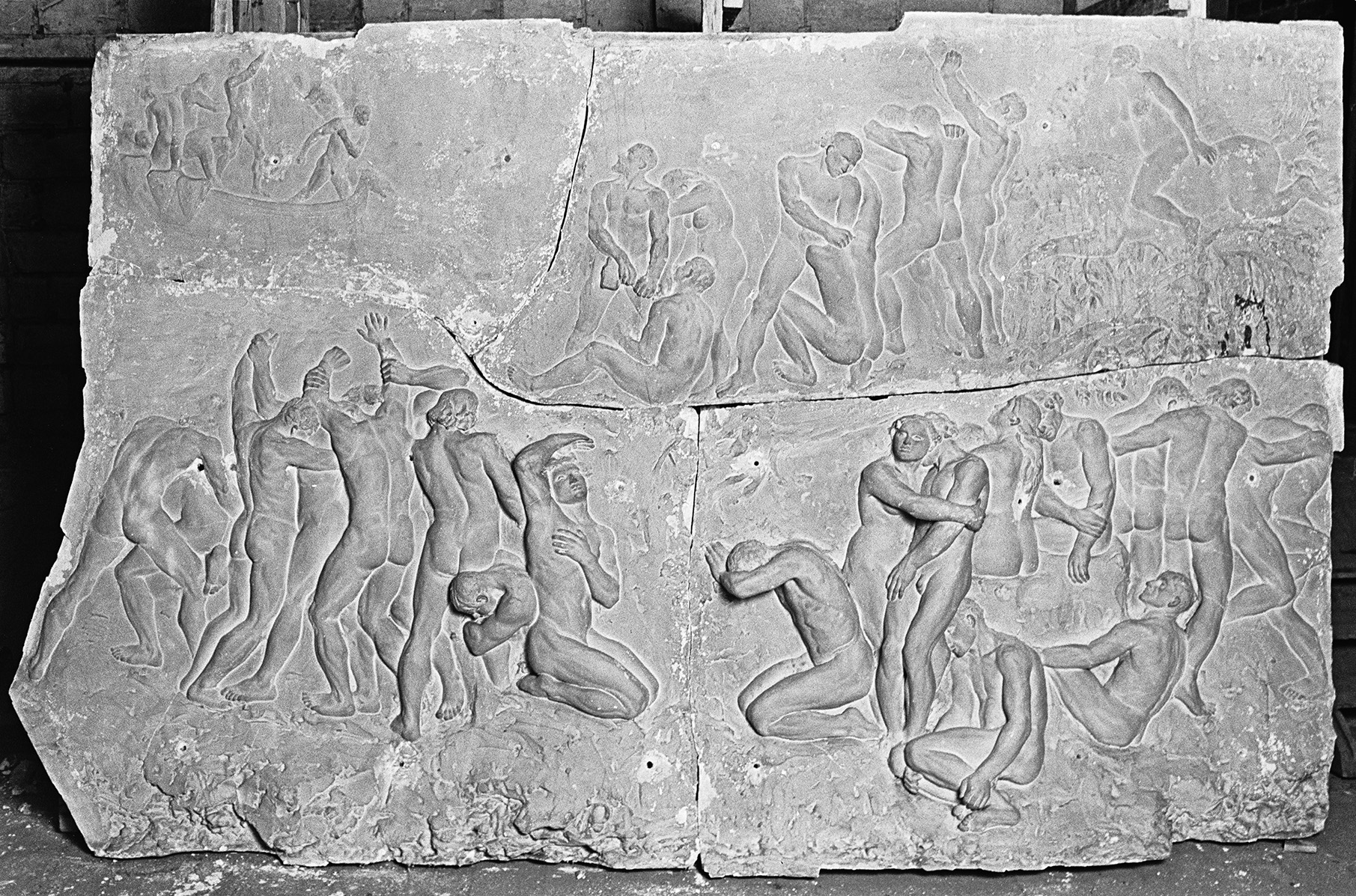
The Battle of Men (1887—1903), gypsum
