= Louise af Forselles =

Finnish philanthropist and salvationist(1850–1934)

Louise af Forselles (1850-1934), was a Finnish philanthropist and salvationist. She was the central figure of the Christian charitable activity in contemporary Finland. She introduced the Salvation Army to Finland in 1889.

Louise af Forselles was a known Christian philanthropist in Finland with a secure position in society due to her status as a baroness. She became involved with the work of the Salvation Army during a visit to her sister in Switzerland in 1888. She was given a suggestion to introduce the army in Finland, to which she agreed. In 1889, she introduced the Salvation army in Finland.
