= List of rivers of Europe =

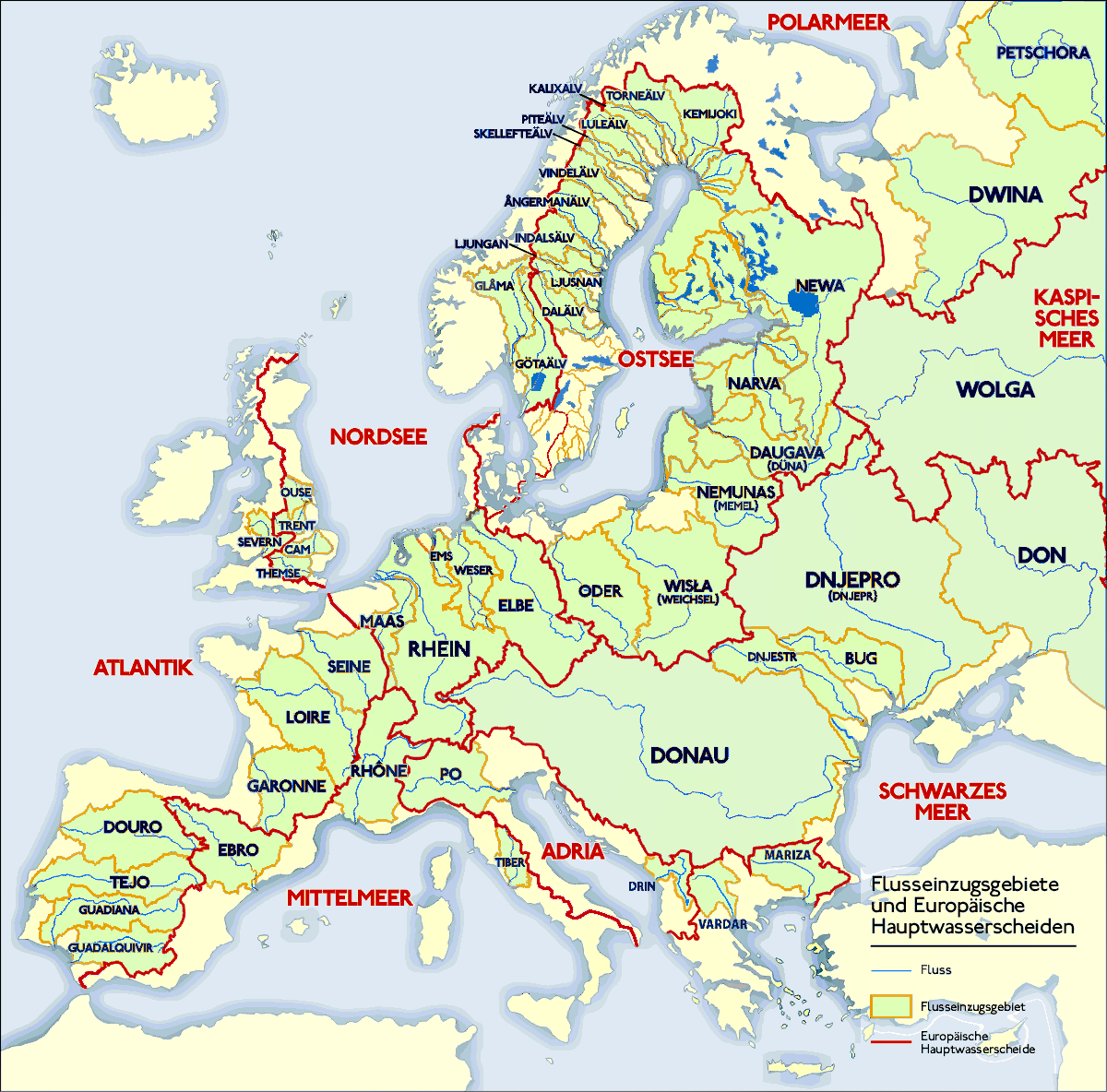
Main European drainage divides (red lines) separating catchments (green regions)

This article lists the principal rivers of Europe with their main tributaries.

== Scope ==
The border of Europe and Asia is here defined as from the Kara Sea, along the Ural Mountains and Ural River to the Caspian Sea. While the crest of the Caucasus Mountains is the geographical border with Asia in the south, Georgia, and to a lesser extent Armenia and Azerbaijan, are politically and culturally often associated with Europe; rivers in these countries are therefore included.

The list is at the outset limited to those rivers that are at least 250 km long from the most distant source, have a drainage basin (catchment area, watershed) of at least 10,000 km^{2} (3,900 sq mi), or have a mean discharge (volume, flow) of at least 150 m^{3}/s (5,300 cu ft/s). Also included are a number of rivers (currently 47) that do not meet these criteria, but are very well known and/or nearly make the mark. Examples of these are the Arno, Ruhr, Saar, and Clyde. See the lists of rivers for individual countries linked to at the bottom of the page for smaller rivers.

The rivers are ordered from those flowing to the extreme northeast into the Arctic Ocean, following the coastline anticlockwise all the way to the southeastern coast of the Black Sea. Iceland and the British Islands are included via virtual connections with northern Norway and across the Strait of Dover and the North Channel, respectively. Finally, rivers draining into the Caspian Sea are listed from Azerbaijan to the Ural River.

The table can be sorted by each column. The first three columns give a ranking for (maximum) length, area and volume of those rivers flowing into the sea or an endorheic lake down to the cut-off values. No ranking of tributaries is attempted, as the concept is too contentious; for example, hydrologically the middle and upper Volga could be considered a tributary of the Kama, in which case it would be the fifth or sixth longest river in Europe. Instead it does not appear in the table at all.

The commercial and geopolitical importance of rivers is not ranked here. As a transportation artery, a river may unite a region commercially and economically, but major rivers, as barriers to travel, may also form political boundaries between states. The Danube, the second longest river in Europe, is notable for flowing through or past ten countries; the Rhine through or past six. The Volga, the longest river in Europe, unites a huge region of European Russia; eleven of the twenty largest cities in Russia lie on its banks. The Loire and the Po unite important regions within France and Italy respectively. The most important rivers in Europe include Rhone, Elbe, Oder, Tagus, Thames, Don and Dnieper, among others.

== Caveats ==
The measurements shown are drawn from sources deemed most reliable, but still are often uncertain, especially when other sources disagree wildly. For example, the Siret in Romania and Ukraine is 726 km long with a basin of 44,000 km^{2} according to the Great Soviet Encyclopedia, 647 km (44,811 km^{2}) according to a Romanian management plan for the Siret basin and 559 km (47,610 km^{2}) according to the extensive transboundary rivers study by the Economic Commission for Europe.

Length estimates for rivers depend on a number of variables:

- River Source – The choice of the source obviously has an impact. Here we attempt to list the most distant source. When that involves a tributary nearer the mouth of the river, the length of the nominal river is listed as well, if it meets the above criteria.
- River End – Rivers flowing into estuaries have an arbitrary lower end. The channel of such a river through an estuary is usually included in the length when it is exposed at low tide.
- Path Granularity – The estimate will be larger when the curves of the river are traced at a smaller scale.
- Intermediate Bodies of Water – The length of a watercourse through a reservoir or lake is open to interpretation. For this table, when a source for the total length of a river system involving lakes is lacking, the shortest possible course through the lakes is used
- Path Changes – Over time, a river's length can change through canalization, the creation of reservoirs, and natural changes in the water course.

The catchment areas are more consistent between sources. However, in low relief the watershed is less obvious, while underground connections (especially in karst systems) further complicate area measurements. Unless excellent sources are available, the areas below 70°N latitude are taken from the HydroBASINS project. The River Networks and Ramsar Sites Information Service websites provide convenient interfaces to assess the accuracy of many of the basins. Areas for rivers above 70°N are warned and found to be less reliable.

The listed multiyear mean discharges are even less reliable than the lengths. Underestimates are most common, as the gauging stations are often far above the mouth, so that only a fraction of the drainage basin is represented. On the other hand, the highest volume of a river may not be at the mouth due to water loss by human usage, diversion (e.g. through distributaries), evaporation, or underground drainage.

== Rivers of Europe ==
Arctic Ocean	Atlantic Ocean	North Sea	White Sea	Baltic Sea	Mediterranean Sea	Black Sea	Caspian Sea

Europe's largest rivers ( over 100 km long, > 10,000 km^{2} watershed, or > 150 m^{3}/s mean discharge)
º
Rank (of fleuves)			River or river system		Length (km)	Basin (km^{2})	Flow (m³/s)	Mouth	Countries (Note: Countries through which the river flows. Like the tributaries, these are ordered from mouth to source. The river's basin may cover more countries than listed here.)	Notes	Refs
Length	Area	Flow	River or river system		Length (km)	Basin (km^{2})	Flow (m³/s)	Mouth	Countries	Notes	Refs
94	82	-	Kara ← Bolshoy Kara		289	13400	?	Kara Sea near Ust-Kara	RUS	(Note: The 32 km Bolhshaya Kara is the longer of the two source rivers of the 257 km Kara proper)
86	86	-	Korotaikha ← Syadej-Yu		310	12700	?	Pechora Sea	RUS	(Note: The 111 km Syadey-Yu is the longest source river of the 199 km Korotaikha.)
6	6	3	Pechora		1809	322000	4380	Pechora Sea near Naryan-Mar	RUS
-	-	-	Sula		353	10400	92	Pechora	RUS
-	-	-	Shapkina ← Lekeyyu		506	6570	582	Pechora	RUS
-	-	-	Tsilma		374	21500	228	Pechora	RUS
-	-	-	Pizhma		389	5470	55	Pechora	RUS
-	-	-	Izhma		531	31000	317	Pechora near Ust-Izhma	RUS
-	-	-	Laya		332	9530	50	Pechora	RUS
-	-	-	Usa		565	93600	1310	Pechora near Usinsk	RUS
-	-	-		Kolva	546	18100	165	Usa near Usinsk	RUS
-	-	-		Adzva	334	10600	110	Usa	RUS
-	-	-		Kosyu	259	14800	122	Usa	RUS
-	-	-		Bolshaya Rogovaya	311	7290	?	Usa	RUS
-	-	-	Shchugor		300	9660	252	Pechora	RUS
-	-	-	Ilych		411	16000	177	Pechora	RUS
105	98	-	Voronya ← Lake Lovozero ← Kurga		251	9940	114	Barents Sea	RUS	(Note: Voronya (155 km) drains Lake Lovozero, which is fed by the Kurga (81 km) 15 km across. The systems starting with Maryok-Afanasiya (62 km, with a 30 km crossing) and Tsaga (45 km, with a 48 km crossing) are nearly the same length.)
84	58	61	Tuloma ← Lake Notozero ← Lutto		320	21140	241	Barents Sea near Murmansk	RUS FIN	(Note: The Lutto (Lotta in Russian; 190 km) flows into Lake Onozero, which, after a 66 km minimal crossing, is drained by Tuloma (64 km).)
73	62	86	Paatsjoki ← Lake Inari ← Ivalo		360	18403	157	Barents Sea near Kirkenes	NOR RUS FIN
70	72	73	Tana/Deatnu ← Karasjohka		366	16386	197	Barents Sea near Tana Bru	NOR FIN	(Note: Karashoka (166 km) and Inarijoki (153 km) join to form the 200 km long Tana River.)
-	-	74	Jökulsá á Fjöllum		206	7750	183	Arctic Ocean	ISL
-	-	32	Ölfusá ← Hvítá		185	6100	423	Atlantic Ocean near Selfoss	ISL
-	-	39	Þjórsá		230	7530	370	Atlantic Ocean	ISL
-	-	65	Kúðafljót		115	2400	250	Atlantic Ocean	ISL
-	-	71	Jökulsá á Dal		150	3700	205	Atlantic Ocean	ISL	(Note: Discharge reduced to 95 m3/s since the building of a reservoir)
-	-	-	Altaelva		240	8693	101	Norwegian Sea in Alta Municipality	NOR
-	-	78	Målselva ← Rostaelva		145	6144	171	Norwegian Sea in Målselv Municipality	NOR
-	-	70	Vefsna		161	4122	207	Norwegian Sea in Vefsn Municipality	NOR
-	-	53	Namsen		229	6298	285	Norwegian Sea in Namsos Municipality	NOR
-	-	-	Gaula (Trøndelag)		153	3661	97	Norwegian Sea in Trondheim Municipality	NOR
-	-	-	Orkla (river)		179	3053	67	Norwegian Sea in Orkland Municipality	NOR
-	-	90	Otra		245	3740	150	North Sea in Kristiansand Municipality	NOR
99	93	59	Skien ← Norsjø ← Saua ← Heddalsvatnet ← Tinne - etc. system		273	10815	263	Skagerrak in Porsgrunn Municipality	NOR
76	-	-	Numedalslågen		356	5554	111	Skagerrak in Larvik Municipality	NOR
89	66	49	Drammenselva ← Tyrifjorden ← Storelva-Ådalselva-Sperillen ← Begna ← Otrøelva		310	17113	314	Skagerrak in Drammen Municipality	NOR
38	37	15	Glomma/Glåma		619	42441	709	Skagerrak in Fredrikstad Municipality	NOR
-	-	-	Vorma ← Mjøsa ← Gudbrandsdalslågen		358	17412	330	Glomma at Årnes in Nes Municipality	NOR
29	34	24	Göta älv ← Vänern ← Klarälven system		756	50229	554	Kattegat in Gothenburg	SWE NOR
-	-	-	Klarälven ← Trysilelva ← Femundelva ← Rogen		460	11820	165	Vänern near Karlstad	SWE NOR	(Note: A single river with different names along its stretch.)
-	-	-	Ätran		243	3342	53	Kattegat in Falkenberg	SWE
-	-	-	Lagan		232	6452	82	Kattegat near Laholm	SWE
10	12	14	Elbe ← Vltava ← Teplá Vltava		1329	148268	860	Wadden Sea near Cuxhaven	GER CZE	(Note: The Vltava (431 km) joins the Elbe 833 km above its mouth in the North Sea. The length and catchment area of the river include the estuary until Cuxhaven, where the estuary is 15 km wide, but the nautical channel only 400 m.)
-	-	-	Elbe		1094	148268	860	Wadden Sea near Cuxhaven	GER CZE	(Note: The length and catchment area of the Elbe includes the estuary until Cuxhaven, where the estuary is 15 km wide, but the nautical channel only 400 m.)
-	-	-	Havel ← Spree		560	24096	103	Elbe near Havelberg	GER	(Note: The Spree (382 km) joins the Havel (334 km) 178 km before that reaches the Elbe.)
-	-	-	Havel		334	24096	103	Elbe near Havelberg	GER
-	-	-		Spree	382	10110	35	Havel in Berlin-Spandau	GER
-	-	-	Saale		413	24167	117	Elbe in Barby	GER
-	-	-		White Elster	257	5154	26	Saale near Halle (Saale)	GER CZE
-	-	-	Mulde ← Zwickauer Mulde		290	7400	75	Elbe in Dessau	GER	(Note: The "Vereinigte Mulde" (124 km) originates from the confluence of the Zwickauer Mulde (166 km) and Freiberger Mulde (124 km).)
-	-	-	Ohře / Eger		316	5588	38	Elbe in Litoměřice	CZE GER
-	-	-	Vltava - Teplá Vltava		431	28101	154	Elbe in Mělník	CZE	(Note: The Vltava proper (377 km) is formed by the confluence of the Studená (Cold) Vltava (8.3 km) and the Warm Vltava (54.3 km))
30	35	44	Weser ← Werra		751	46259	365	Wadden Sea near Bremerhaven	GER	(Note: The 451 km Weser originates at the confluence of the 300 km Werra and the 220 km Fulda. The Weser and Werra originally had the same name (Wesera). The length and basin area include the Innere Außenweser, a channel through the estuary that is exposed at low tide.)
-	-	-	Aller ← Leine		346	15721	120	Weser near Verden	GER	(Note: The Leine (281 km) joins the Aller (260 km) 52 km before that reaches the Weser.)
-	-	-	Aller		260	15721	120	Weser near Verden	GER	212\
-	-	-		Leine	278	6517	62	Aller near Schwarmstedt	GER
-	-	-	Fulda		220	6947	67	Weser in Hannoversch Münden	GER
-	-	-	Werra		300	5497	50	Weser in Hannoversch Münden	GER
69	64	-	Ems		371	17802	89	Wadden Sea near Delfzijl	GER NED	(Note: The length and catchment area include the river channel through the Dollard and Ems estuary, both mostly dry at low tide, up to Eemshaven.)
-	-	-	Zwarte Water ← Vecht/Vechte		201	5741	50	IJsselmeer near Genemuiden	NED GER	(Note: With Zwarte Meer and Ramsgeul, which lead to the Ketelmeer, the length would be 214 km and the basin 5,867 km2)
-	-	41	IJssel ← Oude IJssel		188	4533	380	IJsselmeer near Kampen	NED GER	(Note: The Oude IJssel (82 km, same length when starting from the larger Bocholter Aa or smaller Issel source rivers) flows into the 125-km IJssel 19 km below the IJssel's origin from the Nederrijn. The 106 km lower IJssel drains in the Ketelmeer, which is connected to the North Sea via the IJsselmeer and Wadden Sea. The upper IJssel was formed between the 600 and 900 CE as a distributary of the Rhine and provides 75% of the volume.)
11	11	6	Rhine		1233	185263	2315	North Sea at Hook of Holland	NED GER FRA; AUT LIE SWI	(Note: Basin area excludes the Meuse basin, which could be considered a tributary of the Rhine. The discharge is that for the Rhine just across the border in the Netherlands before it breaks up in its distributaries. The total discharge to the North Sea is considerably higher.)
-	-	-	Waal		82	?	1500	Rhine delta in Gorinchem	NED	(Note: Distributary branch of the Rhine)
-	-	-	Lek		62	?	429	Rhine delta at Kinderdijk	NED	(Note: Distributary branch of the Rhine)
-	-	-	Lippe ← Alme		268	4882	46	Rhine in Wesel	GER	(Note: The Alme (59 km) flows into the 220 km long Lippe 11 km below Lippe's source.)
-	-	-	Ruhr ← Neger ← Renau		227	4485	82	Rhine in Duisburg	GER	(Note: The Neger (20.5 km from both its Renau and Namenlose tributaries) flows into the Ruhr (219.3 km) 202.5 km before it runs into the Rhine.)
-	-	-	Moselle ← Moselotte		549	28153	320	Rhine in Koblenz	GER LUX FRA	(Note: 48 km Moselotte flows into the 544 km Moselle 43 km below Moselle's source.)
-	-	-		Saar	235	7431	78	Moselle near Konz	GER FRA
-	-	-		Sauer	173	4259	41	Moselle in Wasserbillig	LUX GER BEL
-	-	-	Lahn ← Ohm ← Felda		251	5925	51	Rhine in Lahnstein	GER	(Note: The 63.1 km long Ohm, measured from the source of the Felda tributary, joins the 245.6 km long Lahn 58.7 km below the source of the Lahn)
-	-	-	Main ← Regnitz system		583	27208	211	Rhine in Mainz	GER	(Note: Regnitz (191.1 km from its most distant source) flows into the Main, 133.2 km below its most distant source, and 391.8 km before its mouth.)
-	-	-	Main		525	27208	211	Rhine in Mainz	GER	(Note: The White Main (51.7 km) and the longer but smaller Red Main (71.8 km) are the headwaters of the Main (473.2 km). This course has the highest volume at each following junction.)
-	-	-		Regnitz ← Pegnitz ← Fichtenohe	191	7521	57	Main in Bamberg	GER	(Note: The Pegnitz, for the first 15 km known as Fichtenhohe, joins after 127.3 km with the Rednitz, itself 123.7 km long from its most distant source, to form the Regnitz. After a further 63.7 km the Regnitz flows into the Main.)
-	-	-	Neckar ← Eschach		380	13934	136	Rhine in Mannheim	GER
-	-	-	Ill		217	4760	54	Rhine near Strasbourg	FRA
-	-	-	Aare		288	17684	559	Rhine in Koblenz	SWI
-	-	-		Limmat ← Lake Zürich ← Linth	140	2417	101	Aare in Brugg	SWI
-	-	-		Reuss	164	3443	140	Aare in Brugg	SWI
20	40	46	Meuse/Maas		950	34364	357	North Sea near Hellevoetsluis	NED BEL FRA	(Note: Until 1904, when the Bergse Maas was created, the Meuse was a tributary of the Rhine. Because of further canalization in 1970 the Meuse could be considered a tributary of the Rhine again. The catchment area and length include the Haringvliet and Hollands Diep estuaries, which are riverine at low tide.)
-	-	-	Ourthe		181	3624	55	Meuse in Liège	BEL
-	-	-	Sambre		193	2856	29	Meuse in Namur	BEL FRA
73	56	-	Scheldt		360	21683	129	North Sea near Flushing	NED BEL FRA	(Note: The length of the Scheldt traditionally includes the Westerschelde estuary, which is riverine at low tide . The catchment area includes the complete delta (i.e. including the Oosterschelde), while the discharge is for that near Antwerp. Without the Westerschelde the length would be about 295 km. The source of the Leie may be a few km further upstream than the source of the Scheldt itself.)
-	-	-	Leie/Lys		202	4305	28	Scheldt in Ghent	BEL FRA
73	77	-	Thames ← Churn		360	14292	66	North Sea near Southend-on-Sea	UK	(Note: The traditional length of the Thames is 346 km measured from Thames Head to the very end of the Thames estuary at Foulness Point, past the Medway. The traditional catchment area of 12,935 km2 however is for a region above Gravesend and the Medway catchment area is not considered part of the Thames watershed. As a compromise, the given catchment area and length ends at the Medway (338 from Thames Head). The 25 km Churn joins the newborn Thames 3 km below its source to make the total length 360 km.)
-	-	-	Great Ouse		230	8172	39	North Sea in King's Lynn	UK
92	96	-	Trent		298	10435	100	Humber Estuary near Scunthorpe	UK	(Note: The catchment area and length exclude the Humber estuary and the River Don basin (1857 km2), which in 1628 was artificially diverted to Rivers Aire (and eventually Ouse) via the Dutch River, but in 1802 was reconnected to the Trent via the Stainforth and Keadby Canal. Discharge is 89.5 m3/s for 80% of the catchment area.)
-	94	-	Ouse ← Ure		208	10704	145	Humber Estuary near Scunthorpe	UK	(Note: The catchment area and length exclude the Humber estuary, but the catchment area includes the River Don basin (1857 km2) (see River Trent).)
-	-	-	Tyne ← North Tyne		118	2936	45	North Sea at South Shields	UK
-	-	-	Tweed		156	4988	90	North Sea in Berwick-upon-Tweed	UK
-	-	67	Tay		193	6019	220	North Sea near Dundee	UK	(Note: Catchment area and discharge include that of River Earn but exclude the Firth of Tay. It's unclear if the Firth is included in the length.)
-	-	-	Spey		173	2944	66	North Sea near Elgin	UK
18	20	12	Mezen		966	78000	890	White Sea (Mezen Bay) near Mezen	RUS
-	-	-	Pyoza		363	15100	123	Mezen	RUS
-	-	-	Vashka		605	20500	184	Mezen	RUS
78	60	-	Kuloy ← Sotka		350	19000	17	White Sea near Dolgoshchelye	RUS
7	5	4	Northern Dvina ← Vychegda		1803	357052	3330	Dvina Bay in Severodvinsk	RUS	(Note: The 1130 km long Vychegda joins the Northern Dvina 673 km from its mouth in the White Sea.)
-	-	-	Northern Dvina ← Sukhona ← Lake Kubenskoye ← Kubena		1685	357052	3330	Dvina Bay in Severodvinsk	RUS	(Note: The Northern Dvina (744 km) originates at the confluence of the Sukhona (558 km) and the Yug (574 km). The Sukhona starts at the small lake Kubenskoye (a ≈15 km course), which is fed by the 368 km Kubena.)
-	-	-	Pinega		779	42600	430	Northern Dvina in Ust-Pinega	RUS
-	-	-	-	Yula	250	5290	49	Pinega	RUS
-	-	-	Yemtsa ← Mekhrenga		299	14100	70	Northern Dvina near Bolshaya Gora	RUS	(Note: The 231 km long Mekhrenga joins the 188 km Yemtsa, 68 km before it reaches the Dvina.)
-	-	-	Vaga ← Ustya		736	44800	384	Northern Dvina near Bereznik	RUS	(Note: The 477 km Ustya joins the 575 km Vaga 259 km before the Vaga flows into the Dvina.)
-	-	-	Vaga		575	44800	384	Northern Dvina near Bereznik	RUS
-	-	-		Ustya	477	17500	92	Vaga	RUS
-	-	-		Kokshenga	251	5670	36	Ustya	RUS
-	-	-	Vychegda		1130	121000	1160	Northern Dvina in Kotlas	RUS
-	-	-		Viled	321	5610	43	Vychegda near Koryazhma	RUS
-	-	-		Yarenga	281	5140	49	Vychegda	RUS
-	-	-		Vym	499	25600	260	Vychegda near Ust-Vym	RUS
-	-	-		Yolva	255	3440	31	Vym	RUS
-	-	-		Sysola	487	17200	105	Vychegda in Syktyvkar	RUS
-	-	-		Lokchim	272	6600	52	Vychegda	RUS
-	-	-		Vishera	247	8780	79	Vychegda	RUS
-	-	-		Nem	260	4230	37	Vychegda	RUS
-	-	-	Lower Yug ← Luza		609	35600	290	Northern Dvina in Veliky Ustyug	RUS	(Note: The 574 km long Luza joins the Yug 35 km before the Yug merges with the Sukhona to form the Northern Dvina.)
-	-	-	Yug		574	35600	290	Northern Dvina in Veliky Ustyug	RUS
-	-	-		Luza	574	18300	132	Yug	RUS
-	-	-	Sukhona ← Lake Kubenskoye ← Kubena		941	50300	438	Northern Dvina in Veliky Ustyug	RUS	(Note: The name of this river changes from Kubena (368 km) to Sukhona (558 km) after the relatively small Lake Kubenskoye (a ≈15 km crossing).)
33	28	28	Onega ← Lake Lacha ← Svid ← Lake Vozhe ← Vozhega		680	56900	492	Onega Bay at Onega town	RUS	(Note: Vozhega (140 km) runs into Lake Vozhe (<30 km straight crossing inflow to outflow), which is drained by the Svid (64 km), which flows into Lake Lacha (33 km long), where 416 km Onega originates.)
-	-	-	Onega		416	56900	492	Onega Bay at Onega town	RUS
-	-	-	Voloshka		260	7100	72	Onega	RUS
55	45	58	Lower Vyg ← Lake Vygozero ← Segezha-system		436	27100	267	White Sea near Belomorsk	RUS	(Note: The Segezha, 329 km from its most distant source, flows into Lake Vygozero 18 km away from where the Lower Vyg (88 km) drains it.)
-	-	-	Vyg ← Umba		315	27100	267	White Sea near Belomorsk	RUS	(Note: The 33 km long Umba flows in the 135 km Upper Vyg, 112 km before that flows into Lake Vegozero. This 80 km long lake is drained by the 88 km long Lower Vyg.)
-	-	-	Segezha ← Lake Segozero ← Vuoloma ← Talviesdegi		329	9140	74	Lake Vygozero near Segezha	RUS	(Note: Talgiesdegi (48 km) joins Voloma (138 km) 113 km before that flows into Lake Segozero (mean flow 20 m3/s). This lake, crossed in a straight line in 35 km, is drained by the Segezha (59 km), which flows into Lake Vygozero (mean flow 74 m3/s).)
59	44	55	Kem ← Čirka-Kem		422	27700	279	White Sea near Kem	RUS	(Note: Kem (18 km) and Čirka (16 km) form the headwaters of 220 km Čirka-Kem, which, confusingly, joins another much larger river named Kem 7 km below its origin from Kuyto Lake and 184 km before it streams into the White Sea.)
-	-	-	Kem ← Kuyto Lakes ← Pista/Pistojoki		399	27700	279	White Sea near Kem	RUS FIN	(Note: Pistojoki (Pista in Russian; 110 km) feeds the ca. 98 km Kuyto Lakes chain, which, on the other side, is drained by the Kem (191 km).)
82	49	56	Kovda ← Lake Topozero ← Karango		325	26100	276	Kandalaksha Gulf	RUS FIN	(Note: River Kovda, flowing through many large lakes, has a given length of 233 km. Kovda drains Lake Topozero from the northwest; at the very southeast of the lake, 76 and 79 km via a straight course, the small rivers Karango (16 km) and Kondoya (13 km) run in the lake and form the most distant sources of the river Kovda.)
-	85	83	Niva		36	12830	164	Kandalaksha Gulf near Kandalaksha	RUS	(Note: Niva drains Lake Imandra, the longest distance over the complex network of lakes and rivers above it is unclear, though it is over 200 km.)
104	-	-	Varzuga		254	9840	79	White Sea	RUS
58	74	81	Ponoy		426	15500	167	White Sea	RUS
96	75	-	Motala ström ← Vättern ← Huskvarnaån system		285	15481	100	Baltic Sea in Norrköping	SWE
91	54	82	Norrström ← Mälaren ← Kolbäcksån system		307	22650	166	Baltic Sea in Stockholm	SWE
43	43	47	Dalälven ← Österdalälven		542	28954	353	Bothnian Sea near Gävle	SWE NOR
-	-	-	Västerdalälven ← Fulan		315	8642	124	Dalälven in Djurås	SWE
52	59	66	Ljusnan		443	19828	226	Bothnian Sea in Söderhamn	SWE
64	84	-	Ljungan		399	12851	135	Bothnian Sea near Sundsvall	SWE
57	48	30	Indalsälven		430	26726	448	Bothnian Sea near Sundsvall	SWE
48	42	29	Ångerman		463	31864	481	Bothnian Sea near Kramfors	SWE
-	-	-	Faxälven		399	9037	152	Ångerman near Sollefteå	SWE
-	-	-	Fjällsjöälven		263	8432	139	Ångerman near Näsåker	SWE
47	47	33	Umeälven		467	26815	435	Bothnian Sea in Umeå	SWE
-	-	-	Vindelälven		453	12654	188	Umeälven near Umeå	SWE
53	89	86	Skellefteälven		440	11731	157	Bothnian Bay in Skellefteå	SWE
63	92	89	Piteälven		402	11285	156	Bothnian Bay in Piteå	SWE
49	50	26	Luleälven		461	25240	500	Bothnian Bay in Luleå	SWE
-	-	-	Lesser Lule		238	9678	180	Luleälven near Vuollerim	SWE
49	63	52	Kalixälven		461	18130	289	Bothnian Bay in Kalix	SWE
40	38	34	Torne ← Torneträsk ← Abiskojokk ← Válfojohka		565	40157	430	Bothnian Bay in Tornio	SWE FIN NOR	(Note: Abiskojokk (40 km) feeds lake Torneträsk, which is drained after a 55 km crossing by the Torne (470 km).)
-	-	-	Muonio ← Könkämäeno ← Kilpisjärvi		350	14430	162	Torne near Pajala	SWE FIN NOR	(Note: Lake Kilpisjärvi is drained, about 30 km from its headwater's most distant source, by Könkämäeno. The Gobmeatnu tributary, which joins just below the lake, perhaps has a slightly more distant source. Könkämäeno (90 km) and Lätäseno (60 km) join to form Muonio (230 km).)
-	-	-	Lainioälven ← Rostoeatnu ← Rostojávri ← Ohmátjohka		290	6002	70	Torne near Junosuando	SWE NOR	(Note: The southeastern end of the lake Rostojávri, some 26 km from its most distant source is drained by the 266 km long Rostoeatnu- Lainio river.)
42	33	25	Kemijoki		552	51127	553	Bothnian Bay in Kemi	FIN
-	-	-	Ounasjoki		300	13968	140	Kemijoki in Rovaniemi	FIN
-	-	-	Kitinen		278	11214	?	Kemijoki near Pelkosenniemi	FIN
86	78	76	Iijoki		310	14191	174	Bothnian Bay in Ii	FIN	(Note: Peranganjoki → Alajoki (together well over 80 km) → Lake Kiantajärvi (50 km crossing) → Emäjoki → Iijärvi →Kiehimänjoki (these three 103 km together) → Oulujärvi (75 km course) → Oulujoki (107 km). The entire system above the lake Oulujärvi is also referred to as Hyrynsalmi.)
60	53	60	Oulujoki ← Oulujärvi ← Hyrynsalmi system		420	22841	262	Bothnian Bay in Oulu	FIN	(Note: The length of this system is a rough estimate. The Peranganjoki-Alajoki system (>> 80 km) feeds Kiantajärvi. After a 50 km course, this lake is drained by the 105 km long Emäjoki-Kiehimäjnoki watercourse, which feeds Oulujärvi. The entire system above this lake is also referred to as Hyrynsalmi. After a 75 km course through Oulujärvi, Oulujoki (107 km) takes the water to the Bothnian Bay.)
-	46	63	Kokemäenjoki		150	27046	238	Bothnian Sea in Pori	FIN	(Note: Kokemäenjoki drains Kulovesi, the last of a large chain of lakes. The system starting with Keurusselkä, via Kuorevesi, Ruovesi, Palovesi, Näsijärvi, Tammerkoski, Pyhäjärvi, and Nokianvirta to Kulovesi is the central course, but its total length is tricky to define.)
41	39	54	Kymi ← Lake Päijänne ←←← Koivujärvi sources		554	37159	282	Gulf of Finland in Kotka	FIN	(Note: The 204 km Kymi river drains Lake Päijänne, which 120 km further north near Jyväskylä is fed from a network of lakes further north. The sources that feed the lake Koivujärvi are the most distant for Kymi. From there, the shortest route over the so called Rautalampi route (including lakes Pielavesi, Nilakka, Iisvesi, Kiesimä, Konnevesi, Kynsivesi, and Kuusvesi) and via Saraavesi and Leppävesi to Päijänne is 230 km.)
15	7	5	Neva ← Lake Ladoga ← Volkhov-system		1010	281000	2490	Gulf of Finland in Saint Petersburg	RUS	(Note: The 844 km Volkhov system flows into Lake Ladoga ≈92 km (shortest course) from where the Neva (74 km) drains it.)
-	-	-	Neva		74	281000	2490	Gulf of Finland in Saint Petersburg	RUS
-	-	-	Vuoksi ← Saimaa ← Pielisjoki-system		806	68501	584	Lake Ladoga at Solovyovo and at Priozersk	RUS FIN	(Note: The 806 km long Pielisjoki system flows into the northeastern end of lake Saimaa. A ≈260 km course through this complex lake leads to the 156 km Vuoksi exit.)
-	-	-		Pielisjoki ← Pielinen ← Lieksanjoki ←← Murdoyoki	390	20000	240	Lake Saimaa in Joensuu	FIN RUS	(Note: Murdoyoki (41 km) → Roukkulanjärvi (27 km) → Omelianjoki (7 km) → Torosozero-Leksozero (44 km) → Sula River (21 km) → Sula lake (7 km) → Lieksanjoki (132 km) → Pielinen Lake (44 km) → Pielisjoki (67 km) → Saimaa. The watershed area is a rough guess.)
-	-	-	Svir ← Lake Onega ← Vodla-system		678	88200	790	Lake Ladoga near Lodeynoye Pole	RUS	(Note: The 358 km-long Vodla system feeds into Lake Onega. After a 96 km crossing, 224 km-long Svir drains this lake into Lake Ladoga.)
-	-	-		Oyat	266	5220	52	Svir near Lodeynoye Pole	RUS
-	-	-		Shuya	194	10100	130	Lake Onega near Petrozavodsk	RUS
-	-	-		Suna	280	7670	66	Lake Onega near Kondopoga	RUS
-	-	-		Vodla ← Lake Vodlozero ← Ileksa ← Olova	358	13700	130	Lake Onega near Pudozh	RUS	(Note: Olova (42 km) joins Ileksa (155 km) 135 km before that flows into Lake Vodlozero. After a 32 km direct crossing, this lake is drained by the Vodla (149 km).)
-	-	-	Syas		260	7330	53	Lake Ladoga in Syasstroy	RUS
-	-	-	Volkhov ← Lake Ilmen ← Msta-system		844	80200	580	Lake Ladoga near Volkhov	RUS	(Note: The Volkov river (224 km) drains Lake Ilmen from the delta of the 620-km Msta-Tsna system.)
-	-	-		Msta ← Lake Mstino ← Tsna	620	23300	202	Lake Ilmen near Velikiy Novgorod	RUS	(Note: Tsna (160 km) flows into Lake Mstino, which after 15 km is drained by 445 km Msta.)
-	-	-		Pola	267	7420	63	Lake Ilmen near Staraya Russa	RUS
-	-	-		Lovat	530	21900	105	Lake Ilmen near Staraya Russa	RUS BLR
-	-	-		Shelon	248	9710	44	Lake Ilmen near Shimsk	RUS
67	83	-	Luga ← Oredezh		383	13364	93	Gulf of Finland in Ust-Luga	RUS	(Note: The 192 km Oredezh joins the Luga 191 km upstream from the sea)
-	-	-	Luga		353	13364	93	Gulf of Finland in Ust-Luga	RUS
35	29	37	Narva ← Lake Peipus ← Velikaya		647	56229	400	Gulf of Finland near Narva	EST RUS
-	-	-	Narva		77	56229	400	Gulf of Finland near Narva	EST RUS
-	-	-	Plyussa		281	6963	50	Narva near Narva	RUS
-	-	-	Velikaya		430	25153	134	Lake Peipus near Pskov	RUS
-	-	-	Emajõgi ← Võrtsjärv ← Väike Emajõgi		218	10039	70	Lake Peipus	EST	(Note: Väike Emajõgi (82 km) feeds the lake Võrtsjärv. After a 35 km crossing, Võrtsjärv is drained by Suur Emajõgi (101 km))
-	-	-	Pärnu		144	6887	64	Gulf of Riga in Pärnu	EST
51	-	-	Gauja		452	9161	71	Gulf of Riga near Riga	LAT EST
14	18	19	Daugava/Western Dvina		1020	85613	640	Gulf of Riga near Riga	LAT BLR RUS
-	-	-	Aiviekste ← Pededze		254	9135	57	Daugava near Pļaviņas	LAT EST	(Note: The Pededze (159 km) flows into the Alviekste 22 km below Alviekste's source in Lake Lubāns and 95 km before it drains into the Daugava.)
-	-	-	Mezha		259	9525	61	Daugava near Doroshkino	RUS
86	65	-	Lielupe ← Mēmele/Nemunėlis		310	17504	106	Gulf of Riga near Jūrmala	LAT LIT
79	87	-	Venta		346	11843	98	Baltic Sea in Ventspils	LAT LIT
22	17	20	Neman		914	92523	634	Baltic Sea near Šilutė	LIT RUS BLR
-	-	-	Šešupė		298	6194	34	Neman near Neman	LIT RUS POL
-	-	-	Nevėžis		209	5947	33	Neman near Raudondvaris	LIT
-	-	-	Neris/Viliya		510	25254	182	Neman in Kaunas	LIT BLR
-	-	-		Šventoji	246	6804	56	Neris in Jonava	LIT
-	-	-	Shchara		325	6724	31	Neman	BLR
80	79	-	Pregolya ← Lava/Łyna		336	14117	90	Baltic Sea near Kaliningrad	RUS POL	(Note: The 264 km long Lyna/Lava joins the Pregolya 72 km before it reaches the sea)
-	-	-	Pregolya ← Angrapa ← Gołdapa		310	14117	90	Baltic Sea near Kaliningrad	RUS POL	(Note: The Angrapa (ca 170 km) is the longest source river of the Pregolya (123 km). The 89 km Gołdapa joins the Angrapa ca 100 km before the formation of Pregolya.)
-	-	-	Łyna/Alna/Lava		264	7020	40	Pregolya in Znamensk	RUS POL	(Note: HydroBasins data support the 264 km estimate by the Polish source over the 289 km estimate by the Russian source.)
12	9	10	Vistula ← Bugonarew ← Western Bug		1211	192632	1080	Baltic Sea near Gdańsk	POL BLR UKR	(Note: The 772 km long Western Bug merges with the Narew and after a further 38 km flows into the Vistula 401 km above that river's discharge in the Baltic Sea. Though shorter, the Vistula has twice as high a volume at the meeting point.)
-	-	-	Vistula		1047	192632	1080	Baltic Sea near Gdańsk	POL	(Note: The commonly quoted 194,424 km2 catchment area probably includes coastal waters.)
-	-	-	Bugonarew ← Western Bug		810	74714	328	Vistula in Nowy Dwór Mazowiecki	POL BLR UKR	(Note: The 772 km Bug joins the Narew 38 km before its confluence with the Vistula. The 38 km joined stretch used to be and locally still is known as Bugo-Narew.)
-	-	-		Wkra	249	5322	20	Bugonarew near Nowy Dwór Mazowiecki	POL
-	-	-		Narew	446	28645	146	Bugonarew near Serock	POL	(Note: Hydrologically and historically, the Narew is a tributary of the Bug, but by a decree of the Polish regime in 1962 the roles were reversed.)
-	-	-		Western Bug	772	38676	158	Bugonarew near Serock	POL BLR UKR
-	-	-	Pilica		319	9138	46	Vistula near Warka	POL
-	-	-	Wieprz		303	10256	43	Vistula in Dęblin	POL
-	-	-	San		443	16769	126	Vistula near Sandomierz	POL UKR
-	-	-	Dunajec		247	6802	85	Vistula in Opatowiec	POL SVK
13	13	22	Oder ← Warta		1045	118791	574	Baltic Sea in Świnoujście	GER POL	(Note: The 808 km Warta joins the 854 km Oder 237 km above the Oder's mouth.)
-	-	-	Oder		854	118791	574	Baltic Sea in Świnoujście	GER POL CZE	(Note: Canalization reduced the length of the Oder from ca 1040 km to the current 854 km.)
-	-	-	Warta		808	55538	195	Oder in Kostrzyn nad Odrą	POL
-	-	-		Noteć	388	17159	76	Warta in Santok	POL
-	-	-	Lusatian Neisse		255	4403	31	Oder in Neißemünde	GER POL CZE
-	-	-	Bóbr		272	5943	39	Oder in Krosno Odrzańskie	POL CZE
-	-	-	Clyde		176	3045	83	North Channel near Glasgow	UK
-	-	-	Lower Bann ← Lough Neagh ← Ulster Blackwater		186	5775	92	North Channel in Coleraine	UK IRL
101	88	69	Shannon		258	11773	208	Shannon Estuary near Limerick	IRL	(Note: A 102 km long estuary is excluded from the length and catchment area; this estuary has a basin of 15,700-16,800 km2.)
-	-	86	The Three Sisters		192	9207	157	Celtic Sea near Waterford	IRL	(Note: The Three Sisters are the rivers Suir (184 km), Barrow (192 km) and Nore (140 km). Nore flows into Barrow, which 20 km later joins the Suir to form the estuary named Waterford Harbour)
-	-	-	Mersey ← Tame		160	4312	66	Irish Sea near Liverpool	UK	(Note: Length and catchment area include the Mersey estuary, which constricts to 1 km width before entering the Irish Sea. River Mersey originates at the confluence of the 30 mile (ca 48 km) long River Tame and River Goyt)
-	-	-	Wye		215	4136	80	Severn Estuary near Chepstow	UK
77	91	-	Severn		354	11420	120	Bristol Channel near Weston-super-Mare	UK
-	-	-	Somme		245	6548	37	English Channel near Abbeville	FRA
26	21	23	Seine ← Marne		875	75374	560	English Channel in Le Havre	FRA	(Note: The 516 km long Marne flows into the larger Seine 361 km before it drains in the English Channel.)
-	-	-	Seine		777	75374	560	English Channel in Le Havre	FRA	(Note: Seine's catchment area (75,374 km2) excludes the Crique de Rouen estuary; this would add another ≈2800 km2, including the Risle river basin)
-	-	-	Eure		229	6017	26	Seine in Pont-de-l'Arche	FRA
-	-	-	Oise ← Aisne ← Aire		454	16783	110	Seine in Conflans-Sainte-Honorine	FRA	(Note: The Aire (125 km) flows into the larger Aisne (356 km) 121 km below its source. The Aisne joins the smaller Oise about 94 km before it drains in the Seine.)
-	-	-	Oise		341	16783	110	Seine in Conflans-Sainte-Honorine	FRA BEL
-	-	-		Aisne	356	7939	65	Oise in Compiègne	FRA
-	-	-	Marne		514	12783	110	Seine in Ivry-sur-Seine	FRA
-	-	-	Yonne		292	10836	93	Seine in Montereau-Fault-Yonne	FRA
-	-	-	Aube		249	4595	41	Seine near Romilly-sur-Seine	FRA
-	95	-	Vilaine		218	10459	72	Bay of Biscay in Pénestin	FRA
17	14	13	Loire		1006	117356	889	Bay of Biscay in Saint-Nazaire	FRA
-	-	-	Maine ← Sarthe ← Loir		338	22240	127	Loire near Angers	FRA	(Note: The Loir (317.4 km) flows in the Sarthe (314 km). 9.2 km later the Sarthe joins the Mayenne to form the short Maine river, which flows into the Loire after just 11.5 km.)
-	-	-		Mayenne	202	5844	50	Maine near Angers	FRA
-	-	-		Sarthe	314	16250	82	Maine near Angers	FRA
-	-	-		Loir	317	8294	32	Sarthe near Angers	FRA
-	-	-	Vienne		363	21161	210	Loire in Candes-Saint-Martin	FRA
-	-	-		Creuse	264	10279	85	Vienne near Châtellerault	FRA
-	-	-	Indre		279	3428	19	Loire near Candes-Saint-Martin	FRA
-	-	-	Cher		368	13718	96	Loire in Villandry	FRA
-	-	-	Allier		421	14350	144	Loire near Nevers	FRA
68	99	-	Charente		381	9855	49	Bay of Biscay near Rochefort	FRA
46	52	41	Dordogne		483	23957	380	Gironde estuary near Bordeaux	FRA
-	-	-	Isle		255	7558	63	Dordogne in Libourne	FRA
-	-	-	Vézère		211	3715	58	Dordogne near Le Bugue	FRA
39	30	17	Garonne ← Tarn		610	55846	650	Gironde estuary near Bordeaux	FRA	(Note: The 380 km Tarn flows into the Garonne about 230 km before it meets the ocean. As both its volume and catchment area are larger, the Tarn is hydrologically the upper part of the Garonne river.)
-	-	-	Garonne		575	55846	650	Gironde estuary near Bordeaux	FRA ESP	(Note: Starting from the Ruda-Garona, the longest headwater of the Garonne. Length (54 km in Spain, 521 km in France) and catchment area exclude the Gironde estuary.)
-	-	-	Lot		485	11538	155	Garonne near Aiguillon	FRA
-	-	-	Tarn		380	15586	233	Garonne near Castelsarrasin	FRA
-	-	-		Aveyron	291	5176	57	Tarn near Montauban	FRA
-	-	-	Ariège		163	4135	76	Garonne in Toulouse	FRA
89	67	45	Adour		308	16912	360	Bay of Biscay in Bayonne	FRA
-	-	-	Gaves réunis ← Gave de Pau		193	5464	82	Adour near Peyrehorade	FRA
71	70	48	Minho ← Sil		361	16651	340	Atlantic Ocean near Caminha	POR ESP	(Note: The 226 km Sil flows into the Minho about 135 km above the Minho reaches the ocean.)
-	-	-	Minho		309	16651	340	Atlantic Ocean near Caminha	POR ESP
-	-	-	Sil		226	7969	100	Minho near Ourense	ESP
25	16	17	Douro		897	97290	650	Atlantic Ocean in Porto	POR ESP
-	-	-	Tormes		247	7054	42	Douro near Bemposta / Villarino	ESP
-	-	-	Esla		275	16018	182	Douro near Muelas del Pan	ESP
-	-	-	Pisuerga		276	15665	82	Douro near Valladolid	ESP
-	-	-	Mondego		234	6656	108	Atlantic Ocean in Figueira da Foz	POR
16	24	26	Tagus		1007	70756	500	Atlantic Ocean near Lisbon	POR ESP	(Note: The commonly given 80,000+ km2 for the drainage area includes the 7740 km2 basin of the Sorraia, here treated as a primary river.)
-	-	-	Jarama		194	11532	32	Tagus in Aranjuez	ESP
-	-	-	Sado		180	6186	40	Atlantic Ocean in Setúbal	POR
21	25	-	Guadiana (← Cigüela) ← Záncara		922	67027	79	Gulf of Cadiz near Ayamonte	POR ESP	(Note: The 167 km Záncara joins the 155 km Cigüela (or Gigüela) and the 76 km Guadiana Alto in a trifurcation some 755 km before the Guadiana reaches the ocean. On some maps, the following 77 km are still called Cigüela. See the Spanish Guadiana article on the confusion in this river system.)
-	-	-	Guadiana ← Guadiana Alto.		852	67027	79	Gulf of Cadiz near Ayamonte	POR ESP	(Note: The Guadiana Alto/Viejo source river is 76 km long.)
31	27	83	Guadalquivir ← Guadiana Menor ← Guardal		722	57053	164	Gulf of Cadiz in Sanlúcar de Barrameda	ESP	(Note: Hydrologically the Guadiana Menor and its longest source river the Guardal (a.k.a. Barbata) form the true upper course of the Guadalquivir, which has a nominal length of 657 km. Barbata/Guardal - Guadiana Menor (206 km) meets the nominal Guadalquivir 138 km below its source.)
-	-	-	Genil		358	8257	9.3	Guadalquivir in Palma del Río	ESP
82	71	-	Segura		325	16599	26	Mediterranean Sea in Guardamar del Segura	ESP
45	57	-	Júcar		498	21430	49	Balearic Sea in Cullera	ESP
98	-	-	Turia		280	6674	14	Balearic Sea in Valencia	ESP
23	19	21	Ebro		910	84763	577	Balearic Sea near Tortosa	ESP
-	-	-	Segre		265	22719	100	Ebro in Mequinenza	ESP
-	-	-		Cinca	170	9720	82	Segre near Mequinenza	ESP
-	-	-	Jalón ← Jiloca		224	9658	21	Ebro near Torres de Berrellén	ESP
-	-	-	Aragón		195	8529	41	Ebro near Tudela	ESP
-	-	-	Llobregat		170	4948	21	Balearic Sea near Barcelona	ESP
-	-	-	Aude		224	5327	44	Gulf of Lion near Narbonne	FRA
19	15	7	Rhône ← Saône ← Doubs		957	98131	1900	Gulf of Lion in Port-Saint-Louis-du-Rhône	FRA SWI	(Note: The 453 km long Doubs joins the upper Saône to form the 171 km long Grand Saône, which flows into the Rhône 333 km above its mouth in the Mediterranean.)
-	-	-	Rhône		812	98131	1900	Gulf of Lion in Port-Saint-Louis-du-Rhône	FRA SWI
-	-	-	Durance		323	14342	180	Rhône in Avignon	FRA
-	-	-	Isère		286	11890	333	Rhône near Valence	FRA
-	-	-	Saône		480	29321	473	Rhône in Lyon	FRA
-	-	-		Doubs	453	7874	176	Saône in Verdun-sur-le-Doubs	FRA SWI
-	-	-	Ain		190	3765	123	Rhône near Pont-de-Chéruy	FRA
-	-	-	Arno		241	8852	110	Ligurian Sea near Pisa	ITA	(Note: The furthest headstream of the Arno could be considered the 19th-century, 62 km Canale Maestro della Chiana that drains part of Valdichiana into the Arno about 30 km below its source for a total length of over 270 km. 306 km2 has been subtracted from the HydroBasins area for the endorheic Lake Trasimeno.)
62	69	62	Tiber		405	16668	239	Tyrrhenian Sea in Ostia	ITA
-	-	-	Nera		116	4163	168	Tiber near Orte	ITA
-	-	-	Garigliano ← Liri		158	4059	120	Tyrrhenian Sea near Minturno	ITA
-	-	-	Volturno		175	5784	82	Tyrrhenian Sea in Castel Volturno	ITA
-	-	-	Reno		212	5615	95	Adriatic Sea near Comacchio	ITA
32	22	9	Po ← Tanaro		702	73746	1460	Adriatic Sea near Porto Tolle	ITA	(Note: The Tanaro (285 km including its Negrone source river) joins the Po 234 km below its source. A competing longest stretch is 691 km starting from the Maira. (see Po (river) for references and discussion))
-	-	-	Po		652	73746	1460	Adriatic Sea near Porto Tolle	ITA
-	-	-	Mincio ← Lake Garda ← Sarca		203	2977	60	Po near Mantua	ITA
-	-	-	Oglio ← Lake Iseo ← Oglio		280	6598	130	Po near Mantua	ITA
-	-	-	Adda ← Lake Como ← Adda		313	7842	187	Po in Cremona	ITA
-	-	-	Ticino ← Lake Maggiore ← Ticino		248	8061	348	Po in Pavia	ITA SWI
-	-	-	Tanaro ← Negrone		285	8182	116	Po near Alessandria	ITA	(Note: The 9 km Negrino is the longer source stream of the 276 km Tanaro.)
-	-	-	Dora Baltea		168	3921	96	Po in Crescentino	ITA
-	-	68	Tartaro-Canalbianco-Po di Levante		147	2885	218	Adriatic Sea near Porto Viro	ITA
55	76	64	Adige ← Eisack ← Rienz ← Ahr		436	14543	235	Adriatic Sea near Chioggia	ITA	(Note: Hydrologically, this is one river with the upper courses of the Rienz, Eisack and Adige/Etsch as tributaries, as it forms the longest course and has the largest discharge at each junction. The ca 130 km long Ahr->Rienz->Eisack originating under the Dreiherrnspitze joins the 409 km long Adige/Etch 103 km below the latter's nominal source.)
-	-	-	Adige ← Etsch ← Karlinbach		421	14543	235	Adriatic Sea near Chioggia	ITA	(Note: The 17 km long Karlinbach, originating under the Weißkugel, flows into the Reschensee, about 5 km below the official source under the Reschen Pass of the 409 km long Adige/Etsch.)
-	-	-	Brenta		174	4811	93	Adriatic Sea near Chioggia	ITA
-	-	-	Piave		231	4420	137	Adriatic Sea near Venice	ITA
-	-	-	Tagliamento		170	2939	92	Adriatic Sea near Lignano	ITA
-	-	77	Isonzo/Soča		138	3327	173	Adriatic Sea near Monfalcone	ITA SVN
-	97	43	Neretva		240	10380	378	Adriatic Sea near Ploče	CRO BIH
-	-	-	Trebišnjica		187	4926	114	Neretva in Neum	BIH	(Note: The Trebišnjica enters the Hutovo Blato marshland in Bosnia through a complex underground karst system. From here a portion of its waters continues the 9 km long Krupa to join the Neretva. Other portions appear as outlets on the coast, e.g. in Neum in Bosnia, in Slano and most significantly near Dubrovnik in Croatia as the 30 m short Ombla river into the Rijeka Dubrovačka ria.)
66	61	16	Bojana/Buna ← Drin		384	18620	672	Adriatic Sea near Ulcinj	ALB MNE KOS; MKD	(Note: The Drin (343 km from its most distant source) drains partly in the Adriatic, but the main channel, called Drinasa, joins the 44 km Bojana 3 km after that emerges from Lake Skadar.)
-	-	-	Drin ← Black Drin ← Sateska		343	14351	352	Buna near Lezhë	ALB MKD	(Note: The Sateska (38 km) flows into the Black Drin (149 km) less than 4 km after Black Drin's emergence from Lake Ohrid. Black Drin meets White Drin 145 km later to form the Drin proper (160 km). The drainage area (but not the length) includes the 1394 km2 Lake Prespa basin, which drains underground through very porous karst mountains into Lake Ohrid.)
-	-	-		White Drin	136	5005	66	Drin in Kukës	ALB KOS
-	-	-	Morača		100	2820	156	Lake Skadar (Bojana) near Žabljak Crnojevića	MNE
-	-	-	Shkumbin		181	2922	62	Adriatic Sea near Lushnjë	ALB
97	-	-	Seman ← Devoll		281	6124	96	Adriatic Sea near Fier	ALB
100	-	72	Aoös/Vjosë		272	6777	204	Adriatic Sea near Vlorë	ALB GRE
-	-	-	Achelous		220	5662	137	Ionian Sea near Astakos	GRE
-	-	-	Pineios (Thessaly)		216	9301	81	Aegean Sea near Larissa	GRE
93	-	-	Haliacmon		297	8664	80	Aegean Sea near Thessaloniki	GRE
65	51	79	Vardar/Axios ← Treska		393	24503	170	Aegean Sea near Thessaloniki	GRE MKD	(Note: The 132 km long Treska flows into the Vardar about 261 km above its mouth in the Aegean Sea.)
-	-	-	Vardar/Axios		388	24503	170	Aegean Sea near Thessaloniki	GRE MKD
61	68	-	Struma/Strymon		415	16801	76	Thracian Sea in Amphipolis	GRE BUL
-	-	-	Nestos/Mesta		243	5864	45	Thracian Sea near Thasos	GRE BUL
44	31	40	Maritsa/Meriç/Evros		515	53475	383	Thracian Sea near Alexandroupoli	GRE TUR BUL
-	-	-	Ergene		281	11016	28	Maritsa near İpsala	TUR	(Note: The often-mentioned 17,323 km2 drainage area is much too large, as the total area drained by the Meriç (including Ergene) in Turkey is only 14,560 km2.)
-	-	-	Tundzha		380	8583	32	Maritsa in Edirne	TUR BUL
-	-	-	Arda		290	5623	77	Maritsa near Edirne	GRE BUL
-	-	-	Veleka		147	995	9.4	Black Sea near Sinemorets	BUL TUR
104	-	-	Kamchiya ← Luda Kamchiya		254	5373	26	Black Sea near Varna	BUL
2	2	2	Danube		2857	801463	6450	Black Sea near Sulina	ROM UKR MDA; BUL SRB CRO; HUN SVK AUT; GER	(Note: Including the 46 km Breg headstream)
-	-	-	Prut		953	27820	105	Danube at Giurgiulești	MDA ROM UKR	(Note: The most distant source for the Prut may be via the 167 km Cheremosh tributary.)
-	-	-		Jijia	275	5757	14	Prut near Huși	ROM UKR
-	-	-	Siret		559	45857	240	Danube in Galați	ROM UKR	(Note: Siret length estimates range from 559 km to 726 km. The shorter length is supported by HydroBasins data.)
-	-	-		Buzău	325	5537	29	Siret near Galați	ROM
-	-	-		Bistrița	283	7018	66	Siret near Bacău	ROM
-	-	-	Ialomița		417	11116	40	Danube near Hârșova	ROM
-	-	-	Argeș		350	12652	73	Danube in Oltenița	ROM
-	-	-		Dâmbovița	245	2837	26	Argeș near Budești	ROM	(Note: The 237 km-long Dâmbovița forms at the confluence of 8 km Valea Vladului and 6.5 km Valea Otic .)
-	-	-	Yantra		285	7897	47	Danube near Svishtov	BUL
-	-	-	Osam		314	2866	16	Danube near Nikopol	BUL
-	-	-	Olt		615	24130	174	Danube near Turnu Măgurele	ROM
-	-	-	Iskar		368	8511	54	Danube near Gigen	BUL
-	-	-	Jiu		339	10157	86	Danube near Bechet	ROM
-	-	-	Great Morava ← West Morava ← Ibar		550	37709	232	Danube near Smederevo	SRB	(Note: Hydrologically, this is a single river, as it follows at both junctions the river with the greatest length, drainage area and average discharge. The Great Morava (185 km) is formed by the merger of the West and South Morava. The 276 km Ibar joins the West Morava 89 km before it becomes the Great Morava.)
-	-	-		South Morava	295	15550	100	Great Morava near Kruševac	SRB KOS
-	-	-		West Morava	308	15710	120	Great Morava near Kruševac	SRB
-	-	-		Ibar	276	7914	60	West Morava in Kraljevo	SRB KOS MNE
-	-	-	Timiš/Tamis		359	10495	47	Danube in Pančevo	SRB ROM
-	-	-	Sava ← Sava Dolinka		945	94613	1609	Danube in Belgrade	SRB BIH CRO; SVN	(Note: Drainage area is hard to estimate due to the connectivity of the karst system. The most detailed level of HydroBasins data gives a lower drainage area (87197 km2) as it excludes local basins connected as such.)
-	-	-		Drina ← Tara	486	19650	370	Sava near Bijeljina	BIH SRB MNE	(Note: The 140 km Tara is the larger and longer of the two source rivers of the 346 km Drina. The most detailed level of HydroBasins data gives a lower drainage area (18820 km2) as it excludes local basins connected underground via the karst system.)
-	-	-		Lim	220	6797	96	Drina near Višegrad	BIH SRB MNE
-	-	-		Bosna	271	10490	174	Sava in Bosanski Šamac	BIH
-	-	-		Vrbas	235	6501	132	Sava in Srbac	BIH
-	-	-		Una	214	9657	220	Sava in Jasenovac	BIH CRO	(Note: Drainage area is hard to estimate due to the connectivity of the karst system. The most detailed level of HydroBasins data gives a lower drainage area (8076 km2) as it excludes local basins connected underground as such.)
-	-	-		Kupa/Kolpa	297	10194	201	Sava in Sisak	CRO SVN
-	-	-	Tisza ← Someș		1111	154073	863	Danube near Titel	SRB HUN ROM	(Note: The 415 km Someș joins the Tisza 696 km before its mouth in the Danube. The average discharge is that measured at Szeged, which is higher than at places downstream.)
-	-	-	Tisza		966	154073	863	Danube near Titel	SRB HUN ROM; UKR	(Note: The Tisza used to be 1,419 km long, but through canalization between 1846 and 1880 was reduced to its current length of 966 km. The average discharge is for that at Szeged, where it is higher than at places downstream.)
-	-	-		Bega	256	6250	13	Tisza near Titel	SRB ROM
-	-	-		Mureș/Maros	789	30190	190	Tisza in Szeged	HUN ROM	(Note: Average discharge as measured at Arad, where it is higher than at places downstream.)
-	-	-		Târnava ← Târnava Mare	249	6236	15	Mureș near Teiuș	ROM
-	-	-		Körös ← Crișul Alb	365	27123	100	Tisza near Csongrád	HUN ROM
-	-	-		Sajó / Slaná ← Hornád	314	12870	70	Tisza in Tiszaújváros	HUN SVK	(Note: The 286 km Hornád river joins the 229 km Sajó 32 km before the latter streams into the Tisza.)
-	-	-		Hernád / Hornád	286	5414	31	Sajó near Miskolc	HUN SVK
-	-	-		Bodrog ← Latorica	255	13579	115	Tisza in Tokaj	HUN SVK UKR	(Note: Latorica (188 km) and Ondava (147 km) join to form the Bodrog (67 km))
-	-	-		Szamos / Someș	415	16046	132	Tisza near Vásárosnamény	HUN ROM
-	-	-	Drava/Drau ← Isel ← Schwarzach		728	40154	577	Danube near Osijek	CRO HUN SVN; AUT	(Note: At the junction 47 km from its nominal source, the upper Drau is in every hydrological aspect a tributary of the Isel. The longer Isel, 65 km from the Schwarzach source under the Rötspitze, continues straight, is on average almost 3x larger in volume, and drains twice as large a basin. Below the junction the Drau/Drava is 663 km long.)
-	-	-		Mur	453	14108	166	Drava near Legrad	CRO HUN SVN; AUT
-	-	-	Sió ← Lake Balaton ← Zala system		330	14890	39	Danube near Szekszárd	HUN	(Note: Zala (139 km) is the longest and primary inflow of Lake Balaton. 70 km across, Balaton is drained by the 121 km Sió, a water course created in the 3rd century CE.)
-	-	-	Hron		298	5441	54	Danube near Esztergom	SVK
-	-	-	Váh		398	19484	194	Danube in Komárno	SVK
-	-	-	Rába/Raab		311	10401	80	Danube near Győr	HUN AUT
-	-	-	Leitha ← Schwarza		258	2138	8.2	Danube near Mosonmagyaróvár	HUN AUT	(Note: The 78 km Schwarza is the longest source river of the 180 km Leitha.)
-	-	-	Morava ← Thaya ← Austrian Thaya		402	26734	110	Danube in Bratislava-Devin	AUT SVK CZE	(Note: The 311 km Thaya flows into the Morava 91 km before it joins the Danube)
-	-	-	Morava		352	26734	110	Danube in Bratislava-Devin	AUT SVK CZE
-	-	-		Thaya ← Austrian Thaya	311	13419	44	Morava near Hohenau	AUT CZE	(Note: The Austrian a.k.a. German Thaya (76 km) joins the Moravian Thaya (68 km) to form Thaya proper (235 km). The catchment area of 12,772 km2 given in the source accidentally excludes the Kyjovka tributary.)
-	-	-	Enns		254	6084	200	Danube in Enns	AUT
-	-	-	Traun		153	4277	150	Danube in Linz	AUT
-	-	-	Inn ← Aua da Fedoz		522	26053	735	Danube in Passau	GER AUT SWI
-	-	-		Salzach ← Krimmler Ache	232	6829	252	Inn in Haiming	GER AUT
-	-	-	Isar ← Leutascher Ache		295	8962	175	Danube near Deggendorf	GER AUT	(Note: Leutascher Ache (30 km) joins the Isar (291.5 km) 26.1 km below its source.)
-	-	-	Lech		264	4125	115	Danube near Donauwörth	GER AUT
-	-	-	Iller ← Breitach ← Turabach		170	2147	70	Danube in Ulm	GER AUT	(Note: The Breitach (24.3 km from Turabach source) joins with the Trettach (15.6 km) to form the Iller (146 km).)
-	-	-	Cogâlnic		243	5388	6.5	Black Sea near Tatarbunary	UKR MDA
9	23	50	Dniester/Nistru		1362	73158	313	Black Sea near Bilhorod-Dnistrovskyi	UKR MDA
-	-	-	Răut		286	7761	5.7	Dniester near Dubăsari	MDA
-	-	-	Zbruch		247	3365	7	Dniester near Khotyn	UKR
27	26	85	Southern Bug		806	63569	160	Dnieper-Bug Estuary near Mykolaiv	UKR	(Note: The Southern Bug is 857 km long when including its liman; the given drainage area does include the Inhul, which empties in this liman.)
-	-	-	Inhul		354	9773	8.8	Southern Bug in Mykolayiv	UKR
-	-	-	Syniukha ← Hnylyi Tikych ← Hirskyi Tikych		283	16640	29	Southern Bug in Pervomaisk	UKR
4	3	8	Dnieper		2201	509824	1700	Dnieper-Bug Estuary near Kherson	UKR BLR RUS
-	-	-	Inhulets		549	14487	0.3?	Dnieper near Kropyvnytskyi	UKR
-	-	-	Samara ← Vovcha		421	22734	20	Dnieper near Dnipro	UKR	(Note: Vovcha (323 km) joins the Samara 222 km below its source and 98 km before their discharge in the Dnieper.)
-	-	-	Samara		320	22734	20	Dnieper near Dnipro	UKR
-	-	-	-	Vovcha	323	13035	5.3	Samara near Pavlohrad	UKR
-	-	-	Oril		346	10093	13	Dnieper near Dnipro	UKR
-	-	-	Vorskla		452	14511	36	Dnieper near Verkhn'odniprovs'k	UKR RUS
-	-	-	Psel		717	22782	55	Dnieper in Kremenchuk	UKR RUS
-	-	-		Khorol	308	4039	3.6	Psel	UKR
-	-	-	Sula ← Uday		447	19218	29	Dnieper near Kremenchuk	UKR	(Note: 327 km Uday flows into the Sula (363 km) about 120 km above Sula merges into the Dnieper.)
-	-	-	Sula		363	19218	29	Dnieper near Kremenchuk	UKR
-	-	-		Uday	327	6995	9.4	Sula near Lubny	UKR
-	-	-	Ros		346	12581	27	Dnieper near Kaniv	UKR
-	-	-	Desna		1130	88490	360	Dnieper in Kyiv	UKR RUS
-	-	-		Snov	253	8265	24	Desna	UKR RUS
-	-	-		Seym	748	27895	100	Desna in Sosnytsia	UKR RUS
-	-	-	Teteriv		385	15213	18	Dnieper near Chernobyl	UKR
-	-	-	Pripyat ← Horyn		1052	119911	460	Dnieper near Chernobyl	UKR BLR	(Note: The 659 km Horyn joins the Pripyat 395 km above its confluence with the Dnieper)
-	-	-	Pripyat		761	119911	460	Dnieper near Chernobyl	UKR BLR
-	-	-		Uzh	256	8129	25	Pripyat near Chernobyl	UKR
-	-	-		Ptsich	421	9516	48	Pripyat near Mazyr	BLR
-	-	-		Ubort	292	5504	23	Pripyat near Pyetrykaw	BLR UKR
-	-	-		Horyn	659	27065	90	Pripyat near Davyd-Haradok	BLR UKR
-	-	-		Southern Sluch	451	13675	45	Horyn near Zviahel	UKR
-	-	-		Styr	494	12999	45	Pripyat near Pinsk	BLR UKR
-	-	-	Sozh		648	42199	207	Dnieper in Loyew	BLR UKR RUS
-	-	-		Iput	437	10789	83	Sozh near Gomel	BLR RUS
-	-	-		Besed	261	5537	28	Sozh	BLR RUS
-	-	-		Ostyor	274	3382	21	Sozh near Krychaw	BLR RUS
-	-	-	Berezina		613	24895	145	Dnieper near Rechytsa	BLR
-	-	-		Svislach	327	5190	30	Berezina near Asipovichy	BLR
-	-	-	Drut		295	4952	30	Dnieper in Rahachow	BLR
101	-	-	Mius		258	7059	12	Sea of Azov near Taganrog	RUS UKR
5	4	11	Don ← Voronezh ← Polnoy Voronezh		1923	437308	890	Sea of Azov near Azov	RUS	(Note: The 520 km Voronezh (starting from the Polnoy Voronezh source) flows into the Don 1403 above its mouth in the Sea of Azov)
-	-	-	Don		1870	437308	890	Sea of Azov near Azov	RUS
-	-	-	Manych ← Kalaus ← Bolshoy Yankul		863	49977	16	Don near Rostov-on-Don	RUS	(Note: Kalaus (436 km) is the upstream section of Manych (nominally 420 km); Kalaus used to split up into the (West) Manych and East Kanych, but the east branch has been dammed off. The 78 km long Yankul joins the Kalaus 365 km before it changes its name to Manych.)
-	-	-		Yegorlyk	448	14972	38	Manych near Salsk	RUS
-	-	-	Sal		798	20932	15	Don in Semikarakorsk	RUS
-	-	-	Donets		1053	98720	159	Don in Semikarakorsk	UKR RUS
-	-	-		Kalitva	308	10543	?	Donets in Belaya Kalitva	RUS
-	-	-		Aidar	264	7390	15	Donets near Shchastia	UKR RUS
-	-	-		Oskil/Oskol	472	14818	44	Donets near Izium	UKR RUS
-	-	-	Chir		317	10580	13	Don	RUS
-	-	-	Ilovlya		358	9377	9.8	Don	RUS
-	-	-	Medveditsa ← Malaya Medveditsa		748	34914	69	Don near Serafimovitch	RUS
-	-	-		Tersa ← Yelan	326	8807	5.6	Medveditsa	RUS	(Note: The 218 km long Yelan joins the 249 km Tersa 108 km before Tersa flows into the Medveditsa)
-	-	-	Khopyor ← Serdoba		1011	61052	150	Don near Bukanovskaya	RUS	(Note: The Serdoba (160 km) joins the Khopyor (979 km) 128 km after Khopyor's source)
-	-	-		Buzuluk	314	9465	13	Khopyor	RUS
-	-	-		Savala	285	7585	20	Khopyor near Novokhopyorsk	RUS
-	-	-		Vorona ← Chembar	511	13229	42	Khopyor near Borisoglebsk	RUS	(Note: The Chembar (119 km including the upper Chembar) joins the Vorona (454 km) 392 km before the Vorona flows into the Khopyor.)
-	-	-	Bityug		379	8818	18	Don near Pavlovsk	RUS
-	-	-	Voronezh ← Polnoy Voronezh		520	21286	71	Don near Voronezh	RUS	(Note: The 178 km Polnoy Voronezh joins the 164 km Lesnoy Voronezh to form the 342 km Voronezh proper)
-	-	-	Bystraya Sosna		296	13012	74	Don near Yelets	RUS
85	-	-	Yeya		313	9191	2.5	Sea of Azov near Yeysk	RUS
95	-	-	Chelbas		288	4911	2.4	Sea of Azov near Primorsko-Akhtarsk	RUS
24	32	34	Kuban		906	52399	430	Sea of Azov near Temryuk	RUS	(Note: Length includes the Ullukam source river, which at its confluence with Uchkulan forms the Kuban.)
-	-	-	Pshish ← Bolshoy Pshish		270	1927	25	Kuban near Ryazanskaya	RUS	(Note: The 22 km Bolshoy Pshish is the longer source river of the 258 km Pshish proper)
-	-	-	Belaya		265	6054	?	Kuban	RUS
-	-	-	Laba ← Bolshaya Laba		347	12664	96	Kuban in Ust-Labinsk	RUS
-	-	-	Kodori		105	2087	144	Black Sea near Adzyubzha	GEO
-	-	79	Enguri		213	4052	170	Black Sea in Anaklia	GEO	(Note: The discharge below the reservoir is reduced to 40 m3/s)
81	81	36	Rioni		327	13511	424	Black Sea near Poti	GEO	(Note: Discharge is that for the north and south arm of the delta combined.)
54	55	56	Chorokhi/Çoruh		438	22011	278	Black Sea near Batumi	GEO TUR
8	10	30	Kur/Kura/Mtkvari		1364	188378	448	Caspian Sea near Neftçala	AZE GEO TUR	(Note: Many other sources, e.g. , give a 1515 km length, but this is not supported by the HydroBasins data.)
-	-	-	Aras/Araks		1072	102000	141	Kura near Sabirabad	AZE IRN ARM; TUR	(Note: Many other sources, e.g. , give a 1264 km length, but this is not supported by the HydroBasins data. The combined length of the Araks-lower Kura system is nearly as long as the Kura itself.)
-	-	-	Alazani		391	11717	110	Mingachevir reservoir	AZE GEO
-	-	-		Iori	320	4897	15	Mingachevir reservoir near Burunqovaq	AZE GEO	(Note: The discharge is for the middle part of the river; at the mouth it is only 9.8 m3/s due to agricultural use and divergence of water towards the Tbilisi reservoir. Before the completion of the Mingachevir reservoir it was a tributary of the Alazani.)
-	-	-	Samur		213	6777	75	Caspian Sea near Derbent	AZE RUS
71	80	75	Sulak ← Andi Koysu ← Tushetis Alazani		361	14085	176	Caspian Sea near Makhachkala	RUS GEO	(Note: In Georgia, the Pirikiti Alazani (44 km) and Tushetis Alazani (48 km) form the Andi Koysu, which 144 km later joins the Avar Koysu (178 km) to form the 169 km long Sulak River.)
37	36	51	Terek		623	42927	305	Caspian Sea near Kizlyar	RUS GEO
-	-	-	Sunzha		278	12153	85	Terek near Gudermes	RUS
-	-	-	Malka		210	10163	98	Terek near Prokhladny	RUS
28	41	-	Kuma		802	33500	11	Caspian Sea near Lagan	RUS
1	1	1	Volga ← Oka ← Upa ← Uperta		3790	1432506	8087	Caspian Sea near Astrakhan	RUS	(Note: The Oka River, 1559 km starting from the Uperta source river, joins the Volga 1299 km below its source and 2231 km before its discharge in the Caspian Sea.)
-	-	-	Volga ← Kuybyshev Reservoir ← Kama		3771	1432506	8087	Caspian Sea near Astrakhan	RUS	(Note: The 1967 km Kama (1805 km river and 162 km fairway through a full Kuybyshev Reservoir) joins the Volga 1804 km above the mouth. The Kama has a nearly identical mean discharge and length as the Volga (it may have been significantly longer before the reservoirs were created), while unlike the Volga it doesn't change direction at the meeting point, so that hydrologically the Volga could be considered a tributary of the Kama.)
-	-	-	Volga		3530	1432506	8087	Caspian Sea near Astrakhan	RUS
-	-	-	Akhtuba		537	?	153	Volga Delta near Astrakhan	RUS	(Note: Akhtuba is a distributary of Volga that flows parallel to it, joining at multiple places.)
-	-	-	Yeruslan		278	6196	?	Volgograd Reservoir near Kamyshin	RUS	(Note: Before the filling of the Volgograd Reservoir in 1961, the Yeruslan was at least 400 km long and had a catchment area of more than 12,000 km2.)
-	-	-	Tereshka		273	9864	18	Volga near Saratov	RUS
-	-	-	Bolshoy Irgiz ← Bolshaya Glushitsa		679	24010	23	Volga near Volsk	RUS	(Note: Bolshaya Glushitsa (65 km) joins Bolshoy Irgiz (675 km) 61 km below its source)
-	-	-	Maly Irgiz ← Chernava		262	3916	6.4	Volga	RUS	(Note: Chernava (75 km) joins Maly Irgiz (235 km) 48km below its source.)
-	-	-	Chapayevka/Mocha		298	5126	2.5	Volga near Novokuybyshevsk	RUS
-	-	-	Samara		594	46454	46	Volga in Samara	RUS
-	-	-		Bolshoy Kinel	436	14929	34	Samara in Kinel	RUS	(Note: Includes the 14 km Su-Elga source stream)
-	-	-		Tok - Bitkul	312	5897	13	Samara near Buzuluk	RUS	(Note: Bitkul (34 km) joins Tok (306 km) 28 km below its source.)
-	-	-	Sok		363	11455	33	Volga near Samara	RUS
-	-	-		Kondurcha	294	4327	9.4	Sok	RUS
-	-	-	Bolshoy Cheremshan		336	11806	35	Kuybyshev Reservoir near Dimitrovgrad	RUS	(Note: Before the filling of the Kuybyshev Reservoir in 1957, the Cheremshan was at least 440 km long and had a catchment area of more than 15,300 km2.)
-	-	-	Kama		1967	523324	3800	Kuybyshev Reservoir south of Kazan	RUS	(Note: The catchment area and length include the Kama-derived part of the Kuybyshev Reservoir. At full capacity, the reservoir extends to the junction with the Vyatka, shortening Kama as a river to 1805 km. Before the creation of the four large reservoirs in its course, the Kama was 2030 km long up to the junction with the Volga.)
-	-	-		Sheshma ← Lesnaya Sheshma	268	6196	11	Kama near Starosheshminsk	RUS	(Note: 56 km Lesnaya Sheshma joins 259 km Sheshma proper 47 km below Sheshma's source)
-	-	-		Vyatka ← Belaya	1318	128713	890	Kama near Nizhnekamsk	RUS	(Note: The 96 km Belaya source river joins the 1314 km Vyatka 92 km below Vyatka's source.)
-	-	-		Kilmez ← Ut	295	17160	85	Vyatka near Ust-Kilmez	RUS	(Note: 107 km Ut joins the 270 km Kilmez 188 km before Kilmez flows into Vyatka)
-	-	-		Pizhma	305	14981	90	Vyatka near Sovetsk	RUS
-	-	-		Moloma ← Palomka	435	12399	48	Vyatka near Kotelnich	RUS	(Note: Palomka (44 km) joins the Moloma (419 km) 28 km below Moloma's source)
-	-	-		Cheptsa ← Loza	526	20230	130	Vyatka in Kirovo-Chepetsk	RUS	(Note: 127 km Loza joins the 501 km Cheptsa 102 km below Cheptsa's source)
-	-	-		Letka	260	3633	21	Vyatka	RUS
-	-	-		Kobra	324	7824	55	Vyatka near Nagorsk	RUS
-	-	-		Ik	571	17934	46	Kama near Menzelinsk	RUS
-	-	-		Izh	259	8469	34	Kama	RUS
-	-	-		Belaya	1430	141609	858	Kama near Neftekamsk	RUS
-	-	-		Bystry Tanyp	345	7700	45	Belaya	RUS
-	-	-		Dyoma ← Tyatep	556	13022	35	Belaya in Ufa	RUS	(Note: The 91 km Tyatep joins the 535 km Dyoma 70 km below Dyoma's source.)
-	-	-		Ufa ← Ay	931	52747	388	Belaya in Ufa	RUS	(Note: The 549 km long Ay joins the Ufa 382 km before that flows in to the Belaya.)
-	-	-		Ufa	918	52747	388	Belaya in Ufa	RUS
-	-	-		Yuryuzan	404	7850	55	Ufa near Karaidel	RUS
-	-	-		Ay	549	14825	84	Ufa near Krasnoufimsk	RUS
-	-	-		Sim ← Inzer	313	11629	110	Belaya	RUS	(Note: The 307 km Inzer joins the 239 km Sim just 6 km before that flows into the Belaya. Before their junction, Sim's discharge is >48 m3/s and Inzer's is 51 to 67 m3/s, but the 6 km joined stretch is named Sim.)
-	-	-		Chusovaya	592	46812	222	Kama Reservoir near Perm	RUS	(Note: Includes the catchment area of the Sylva tributary. Since the building of the Kama Hydroelectric Station both rivers now feed into an arm of the Kama Reservoir.)
-	-	-		Sylva	493	22188	139	Chusovaya near Perm	RUS
-	-	-		Usva	266	6125	31	Chusovaya in Chusovoy	RUS
-	-	-		Kosva ← Typyl	298	7322	90	Kama Reservoir near Perermskoye	RUS	(Note: Typyl (68 km) joins Kosva (238 km), 53 km below the source of the Kosva.)
-	-	-		Inva	257	6304	29	Kama Reservoir near Maykor	RUS	(Note: Drainage area but not the length includes the reservoir arm derived from the river.)
-	-	-		Yayva	304	6530	88	Kama Reservoir near Berezniki	RUS
-	-	-		Vishera ← Kolva	494	31286	457	Kama near Solikamsk	RUS	(Note: Kolva (460 km) joins the Vishera (415 km) just 34 km before the Vishera streams into the Kama.)
-	-	-		Vishera	415	31286	457	Kama near Solikamsk	RUS
-	-	-		Kolva	460	13311	200	Vishera at Cherdyn, Perm Krai	RUS	(Note: Discharge unknown; calculated from the fraction of the Vishera basin comprised by the Kolva basin.)
-	-	-		Yazva ← Glukhaya Vilva	272	5855	70	Vishera near Cherdyn	RUS	(Note: The 234 km Glukhaya Vilva joins the 176 km Yazva 38 km before that flows into the Vishera.)
-	-	-		Kosa	267	9851	40	Kama near Ust-Kosa	RUS
-	-	-		Veslyana	266	7253	68	Kama near Ust-Veslyana	RUS
-	-	-	Sviyaga ← Malaya Sviyaga		379	16944	57	Kuybyshev Reservoir west of Kazan	RUS	(Note: The 41 km Malaya Sviyaga joins the 375 km Sviyaga 37 km after the latter's source.)
-	-	-	Bolshaya Kokshaga		297	6481	40	Volga near Kokshaysk	RUS
-	-	-	Vetluga ← Vokhma		901	39438	255	Volga near Kozmodemyansk	RUS	(Note: The 219 km Vokhma joins the 889 km Vetluga, 207 km below Veluga's source)
-	-	-		Usta	253	6019	28	Vetluga near Voskresenskoye	RUS
-	-	-	Sura ← Kadada		867	67240	260	Volga in Vasilsursk	RUS	(Note: The Kadada (153 km from its Tahtala source) joins the 841 km Sura 137 km below the source of the Sura itself.)
-	-	-		Pyana ← Cheka	453	7991	25	Sura near Sergach	RUS	(Note: The 70 km Cheka joins the 436 km Pyana 53 km below its source.)
-	-	-		Alatyr	304	11171	43	Sura at Alatyr	RUS	(Note: The 168 km Cheka joins the 296 km Alatyr 160 km below the source of the Alatyr itself.)
-	-	-	Kerzhenets		290	6207	20	Volga near Lyskovo	RUS
-	-	-	Oka ← Upa ← Uperta		1559	244308	1258	Volga in Nizhny Novgorod	RUS	(Note: The 63 km long Uperta joins the 345 km Upa 52 km below its source. Upa then flows into the 1504 km-long Oka 1203 km before the Oka joins the Volga.)
-	-	-	Oka		1504	244308	1258	Volga in Nizhny Novgorod	RUS
-	-	-		Klyazma	686	42421	147	Oka in Gorbatov	RUS
-	-	-		Nerl	284	6766	26	Klyazma near Bogolyubovo	RUS
-	-	-		Tyosha	311	7781	4	Oka near Murom	RUS
-	-	-		Moksha ← Azyas	660	50379	95	Oka near Yelatma	RUS	(Note: Azyas (40 km) joins Moksha (656 km) 36 km below Moksha's source)
-	-	-		Tsna ← Osinovka	457	21437	46	Moksha near Sasovo	RUS	(Note: Osinovka (37 km) joins Tsna (451 km) 31 km below Tsna's source.)
-	-	-		Pronya	336	10180	50	Oka near Spassk-Ryazansky	RUS
-	-	-		Moskva ← Ruza	487	17618	150	Oka in Kolomna	RUS	(Note: The 145 km Ruza joins the 473 km long Moskva 342 km before the Moskva flows into the Oka. Before canalization, the Moskva itself was 502 km long)
-	-	-		Protva	282	4602	25	Oka near Serpukhov	RUS
-	-	-		Ugra ← Demina	436	15699	90	Oka near Kaluga	RUS	(Note: The 64 km Demina joins the 399 km Ugra 27 km below its source.)
-	-	-		Upa ← Uperta	356	9529	40	Oka near Suvorov	RUS	(Note: The 63 km Uperta joins the 345 km Upa 293 km before that joins the Oka.)
-	-	-	Unzha ← Kema		531	29156	158	Volga near Yuryevets	RUS	(Note: The 426 km long Unzha originates at the confluence of the 105 km long Kema and 89 km long Lyndonga rivers.)
-	-	-		Neya	253	6286	46	Unzha near Makaryev	RUS
-	-	-	Kostroma		354	19838	85	Gorky Reservoir in Kostroma	RUS
-	-	-	Sheksna ← Lake Beloye ← Kema		441	21419	172	Rybinsk Reservoir near Rybinsk	RUS	(Note: The Sheksna was about 700 km long and had a catchment area of ca 39,000 km2 before the creation of the Rybinsk Reservoir in 1947.)
-	-	-		Suda ← Nozhema	261	13469	134	Rybinsk Reservoir near Cherepovets	RUS	(Note: The 184 km long Suda originates from the confluence of the Noshema (77 km) and the Koloshma (68 km))
-	-	-	Mologa		456	30074	172	Rybinsk Reservoir near Rybinsk	RUS	(Note: The Mologa was about 700 km long and had a catchment area of over 37,000 km2 before the creation of the Rybinsk Reservoir in 1947.)
-	-	-		Chagodoshcha ← Lid	286	9333	58	Mologa near Ustyuzhna	RUS	(Note: The 146 km long Lid joins the 242 km Chagodoshcha 140 km before it flows into the Mologa.)
-	-	-	Medveditsa		259	6384	41	Volga near Sknyatino	RUS
36	90	-	Maly Uzen		638	11600	8	Kamysh-Samarskiye Lakes	KAZ RUS	(Note: The average discharge is measured at stations in the upper part of the river.)
34	73	-	Bolshoy Uzen		650	15795	11	Kamysh-Samarskiye Lakes	KAZ RUS
3	8	37	Ural		2428	210581	400	Caspian Sea in Atyrau	KAZ RUS
-	-	-	Chagan		264	7530	7.7	Ural in Oral	KAZ RUS
-	-	-	Utva		290	6952	3.8	Ural	KAZ
-	-	-	Ilek		623	41875	40	Ural near Ilek	RUS KAZ
-	-	-		Bolshaya Khobda - Karakhobda	363	14666	14	Ilek	RUS KAZ	(Note: Discharge unknown; calculated from the fraction of the Ilek basin comprised by the Khobda basin.)
-	-	-	Sakmara		798	31040	144	Ural in Orenburg	RUS
-	-	-		Bolshoy Ik	341	7651	61	Sakmara near Saraktash	RUS
-	-	-	Or		332	18533	21	Ural near Orsk	RUS

== Rivers of Europe by length ==
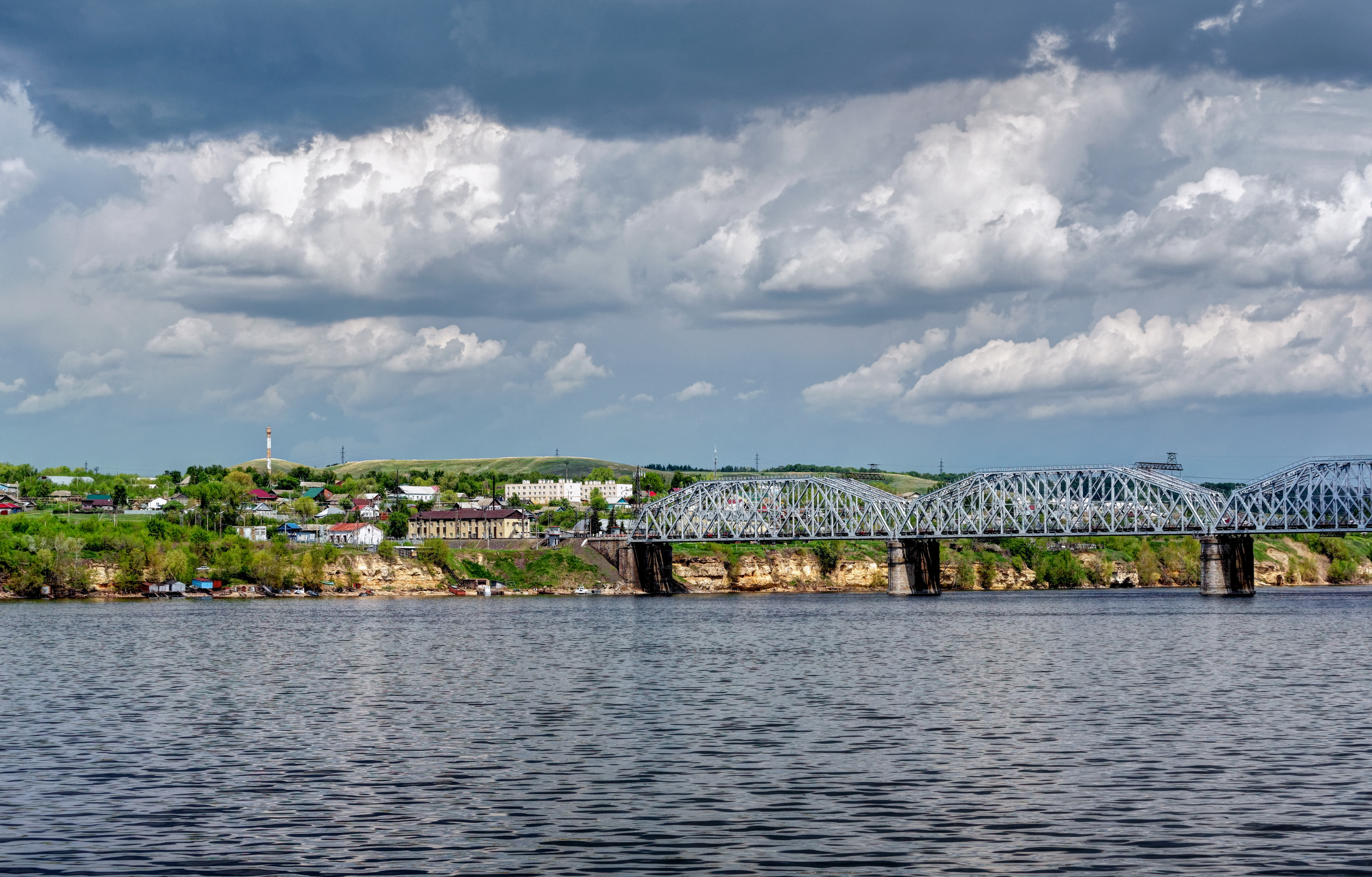
The Volga, the longest river in Europe, in Oktyabrsk, Russia.

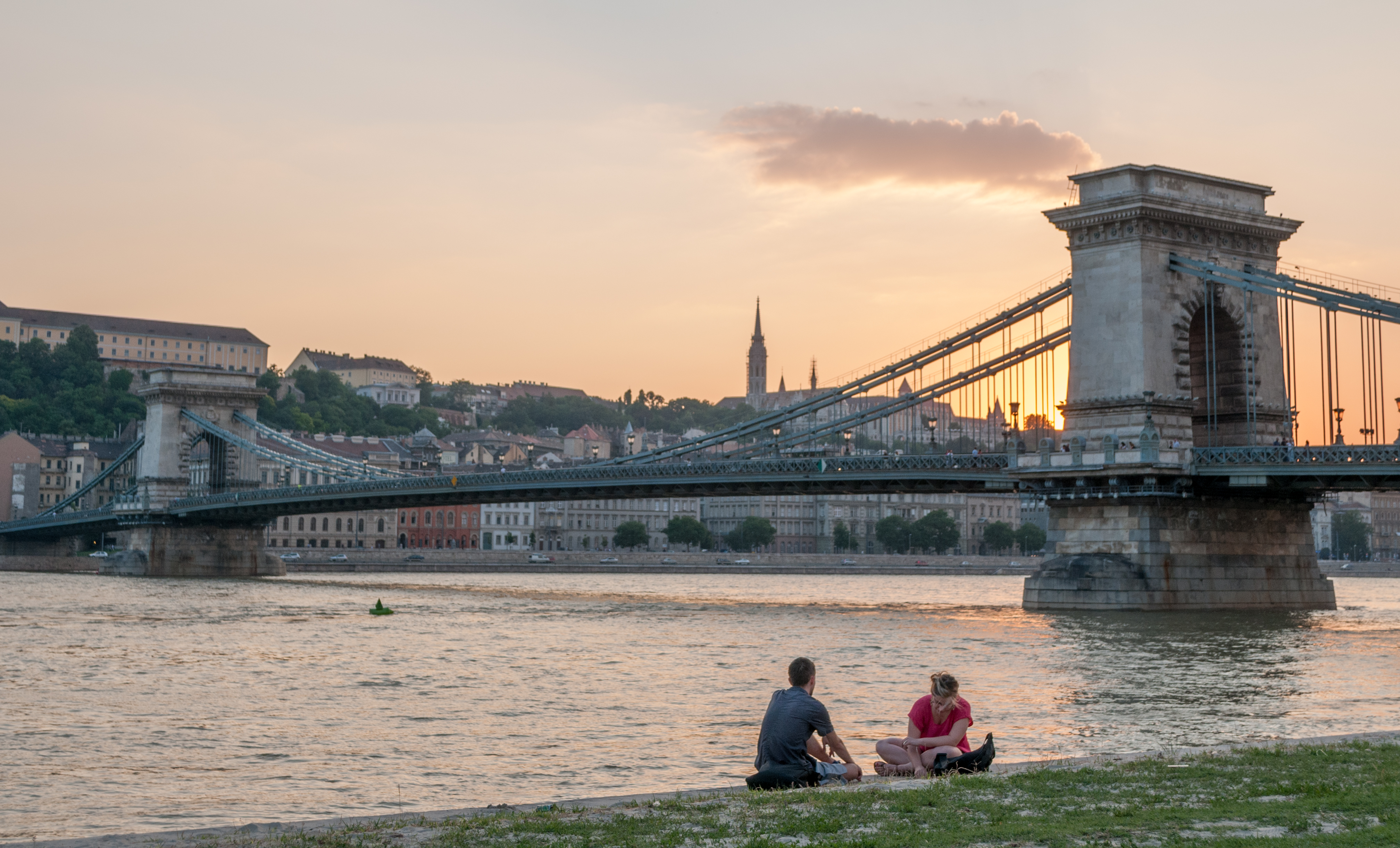
The Danube, Europe's second-longest river, in Budapest, Hungary.

Dnieper, fourth-longest river, in Kyiv, Ukraine.

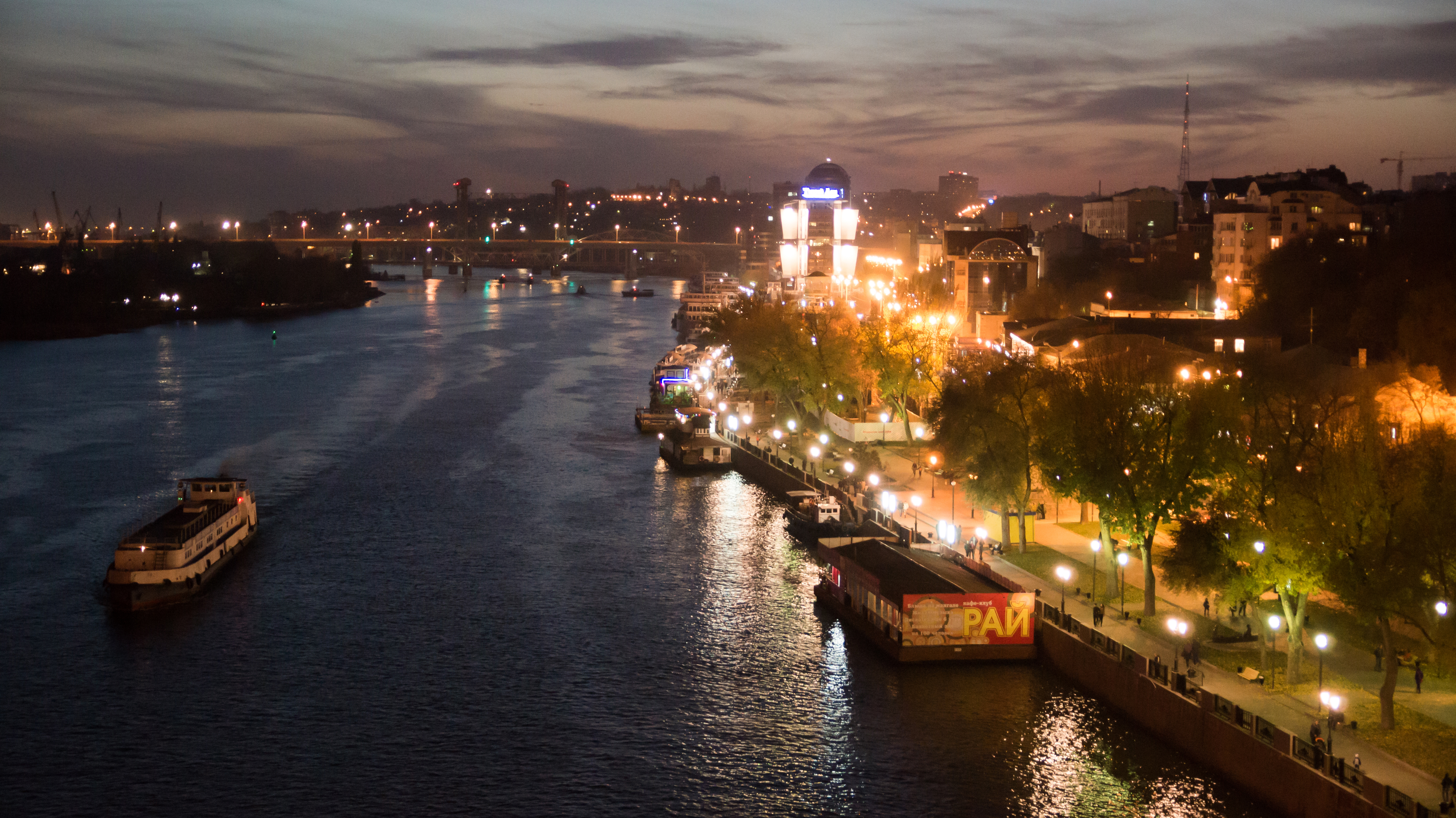
Don River, 5th-longest river, in Rostov-on-Don, Russia, at night.

The longest rivers in Europe with their approximate lengths (incomplete list):

1. Volga - 3,690 km (2,290 mi)
2. Danube - 2,860 km (1,780 mi)
3. Ural - 2,428 km (1,509 mi)
4. Dnieper - 2,290 km (1,420 mi)
5. Don - 1,950 km (1,210 mi)
6. Pechora - 1,809 km (1,124 mi)
7. Kama - 1,805 km (1,122 mi) (the longest left tributary of the Volga and the largest one in discharge)
8. Oka - 1,500 km (930 mi) (the longest right tributary of Volga)
9. Belaya - 1,430 km (890 mi) (tributary of Kama)
10. Dniester - 1,352 km (840 mi)
11. Rhine - 1,236 km (768 mi)
12. Desna - 1,130 km (700 mi) (major left tributary of Dnieper)
13. Elbe - 1,091 km (678 mi)
14. Donets - 1,053 km (654 mi) (major right tributary of Don River)
15. Vistula - 1,047 km (651 mi)
16. Tagus - 1,038 km (645 mi)
17. Daugava - 1,020 km (630 mi)
18. Loire - 1,012 km (629 mi)
19. Tisza - 966 km (600 mi) (1,358 km (844 mi) before 1880) (tributary of the Danube)
20. Ebro - 960 km (600 mi)
21. Prut - 953 km (592 mi) (tributary of the Danube)
22. Neman - 937 km (582 mi)
23. Sava - 933 km (580 mi) (tributary of the Danube)
24. Meuse - 925 km (575 mi)
25. Kuban - 906 km (563 mi)
26. Douro - 897 km (557 mi)
27. Mezen - 857 km (533 mi)
28. Oder - 854 km (531 mi)
29. Guadiana - 829 km (515 mi)
30. Rhône - 815 km (506 mi)
31. Southern Bug - 806 km (501 mi)
32. Kuma - 802 km (498 mi)
33. Warta - 795 km (494 mi) (major tributary of Oder)
34. Seine - 776 km (482 mi)
35. Mureș - 761 km (473 mi)
36. Northern Dvina - 744 km (462 mi)
37. Vychegda - 744 km (462 mi) (major left tributary of Northern Dvina)
38. Drava - 710 km (440 mi) (tributary of the Danube)
39. Po - 682 km (424 mi)
40. Guadalquivir - 657 km (408 mi)
41. Bolshoy Uzen - 650 km (400 mi)
42. Siret - 647 km (402 mi) (tributary of the Danube)
43. Maly Uzen - 638 km (396 mi) (tributary of Bolshoy Uzen)
44. Terek - 623 km (387 mi)
45. Olt - 615 km (382 mi) (tributary of the Danube)
46. Vashka - 605 km (376 mi) (major tributary of Mezen)
47. Glomma - 604 km (375 mi) (Norway's longest and most voluminous river)
48. Garonne - 602 km (374 mi)
49. Usa - 565 km (351 mi) (major tributary of Pechora)
50. Kemijoki - 550 km (340 mi)
51. Great Morava - 550 km (340 mi) (tributary of the Danube)
52. Moselle 546 km (339 mi) (longest left tributary of Rhine)
53. Main 525 km (326 mi) (longest right tributary of Rhine)
54. Torne - 522 km (324 mi)
55. Dalälven - 520 km (320 mi)
56. Inn 518 km (322 mi)(tributary of the Danube)
57. Maritsa - 515 km (320 mi)
58. Marne - 514 km (319 mi) (major tributary of Seine)
59. Neris - 510 km (320 mi)
60. Júcar - 509 km (316 mi)
61. Dordogne - 483 km (300 mi)
62. Saône - 480 km (300 mi) (major tributary of Rhône)
63. Moskva - 473 km (294 mi) (tributary of Oka)
64. Ume - 470 km (290 mi)
65. Mur - 464 km (288 mi) (tributary of Drava)
66. Ångerman - 460 km (290 mi)
67. Klarälven - 460 km (290 mi) (major tributary of the Göta älv)
68. Lule - 460 km (290 mi)
69. Doubs - 453 km (281 mi)
70. Gauja - 452 km (281 mi)
71. Weser - 452 km (281 mi)
72. Kalix - 450 km (280 mi)
73. Vindel River - 445 km (277 mi) (major tributary of the Ume River)
74. Ljusnan - 430 km (270 mi)
75. Indalsälven - 430 km (270 mi)
76. Vltava - 430 km (270 mi) (major tributary of the Elbe)
77. Ponoy - 426 km (265 mi)
78. Ialomița - 417 km (259 mi)
79. Onega- 416 km (258 mi)
80. Someș - 415 km (258 mi) (tributary of Tisza)
81. Struma - 415 km (258 mi)
82. Adige - 410 km (250 mi)
83. Skellefte - 410 km (250 mi)
84. Tiber - 406 km (252 mi)
85. Vah - 406 km (252 mi) (tributary of the Danube)
86. Pite - 400 km (250 mi)
87. Faxälven - 399 km (248 mi) (major tributary of the Ångerman)
88. Vardar - 388 km (241 mi)
89. Shannon - 386 km (240 mi)
90. Charente - 381 km (237 mi)
91. Iskar - 368 km (229 mi) (tributary of the Danube)
92. Tundzha - 365 km (227 mi) (major tributary of Maritsa)
93. Ems - 362 km (225 mi)
94. Tana - 361 km (224 mi)
95. Scheldt - 360 km (220 mi)
96. Timiș - 359 km (223 mi) (tributary of the Danube)
97. Genil - 358 km (222 mi)
98. Severn - 354 km (220 mi)
99. Morava - 353 km (219 mi) (tributary of the Danube)
100. Luga - 353 km (219 mi)
101. Argeș - 350 km (220 mi) (tributary of the Danube)
102. Ljungan - 350 km (220 mi)
103. Minho - 350 km (220 mi)
104. Venta - 346 km (215 mi)
105. Thames - 346 km (215 mi)
106. Drina - 346 km (215 mi) (major tributary of Sava, Danube)
107. Jiu - 339 km (211 mi) (tributary of the Danube)
108. Drin - 335 km (208 mi)
109. Segura - 325 km (202 mi)
110. Osam - 314 km (195 mi) (tributary of the Danube)
111. Trent - 297 km (185 mi)
112. Haliakmon - 297 km (185 mi)
113. Arda - 290 km (180 mi) (tributary of Maritsa)
114. Yantra - 285 km (177 mi) (tributary of the Danube)
115. Bosna - 271 km (168 mi) (major tributary of Sava, Danube)
116. Kamchiya - 254 km (158 mi)
117. Wye - 250 km (160 mi)
118. Mesta - 243 km (151 mi)

== Rivers of Europe by discharge ==
Largest primary rivers of Europe by discharge:
River	Average discharge (m^{3}/s) at mouth
01 Volga	8,380
02 Danube	6,452
03 Pechora	4,800
04 N. Dvina	3,400
05 Rhine	2,900
06 Neva	2,770
07 Rhône	1,900
08 Dnieper	1,670
09 Po	1,540
10 Vistula	1,100
11 Don	985
12 Loire	940
13 Mezen	886
14 Elbe	861
15 Glomma	720
16 Douro	700
17 Neman	690
18 Daugava	678
19 Garonne	676
20 Buna	672
21 Göta	585
22 Ebro	577
23 Odera	574
24 Seine	563
25 Kemi	556
26 Lule	520
27 Onega	505
28 Ångerman	500
29 Tagus	500

This is an incomplete list of the largest rivers of Europe by discharge:

1. Volga - 8,087 m^{3}/s (285,600 cu ft/s)
2. Danube - 6,450 m^{3}/s (228,000 cu ft/s)
3. Pechora - 4,380 m^{3}/s (155,000 cu ft/s)
4. Kama - 3,800 m^{3}/s (130,000 cu ft/s) (the longest left tributary of the Volga and the largest one in discharge)
5. Northern Dvina - 3,330 m^{3}/s (118,000 cu ft/s)
6. Neva - 2,490 m^{3}/s (88,000 cu ft/s)
7. Rhine - 2,315 m^{3}/s (81,800 cu ft/s) (Aare - 560 m^{3}/s (20,000 cu ft/s) as major tributary of the Rhine, even larger than Rhine's contribution of 440 m^{3}/s (16,000 cu ft/s) at their confluence in Koblenz; Waal - 1,500 m^{3}/s (53,000 cu ft/s) as its main distributary)
8. Rhône - 1,900 m^{3}/s (67,000 cu ft/s)
9. Dnieper - 1,700 m^{3}/s (60,000 cu ft/s)
10. Sava - 1,609 m^{3}/s (56,800 cu ft/s) (tributary of the Danube)
11. Po - 1,460 m^{3}/s (52,000 cu ft/s) (largest river in Italy)
12. Usa - 1,310 m^{3}/s (46,000 cu ft/s) (major tributary of Pechora)
13. Oka - 1,258 m^{3}/s (44,400 cu ft/s) (the longest right tributary of the Volga)
14. Vychegda - 1,160 m^{3}/s (41,000 cu ft/s) (major left tributary of Northern Dvina)
15. Vistula - 1,080 m^{3}/s (38,000 cu ft/s)
16. Don - 890 m^{3}/s (31,000 cu ft/s)
17. Mezen - 890 m^{3}/s (31,000 cu ft/s)
18. Vyatka - 890 m^{3}/s (31,000 cu ft/s) (tributary of the Kama, Volga)
19. Loire - 889 m^{3}/s (31,400 cu ft/s)
20. Tisza - 863 m^{3}/s (30,500 cu ft/s) (tributary of the Danube)
21. Elbe - 860 m^{3}/s (30,000 cu ft/s)
22. Belaya - 858 m^{3}/s (30,300 cu ft/s) (tributary of the Kama, Volga)
23. Svir - 790 m^{3}/s (28,000 cu ft/s) (tributary of Neva, through Lake Onega)
24. Inn - 735 m^{3}/s (26,000 cu ft/s) (tributary of the Danube)
25. Douro - 720 m^{3}/s (25,000 cu ft/s) (Most voluminous river in Iberian Peninsula)
26. Glomma - 709 m^{3}/s (25,000 cu ft/s) (Norway's longest and most voluminous river)
27. Neman - 678 m^{3}/s (23,900 cu ft/s)
28. Göta älv - 575 m^{3}/s (20,300 cu ft/s)
29. Lule älv - 505 m^{3}/s (17,800 cu ft/s)
30. Ångermanälven - 500 m^{3}/s (18,000 cu ft/s)
31. Indalsälven - 445 m^{3}/s (15,700 cu ft/s)
32. Umeälven - 443 m^{3}/s (15,600 cu ft/s)
33. Kuban River - 430 m^{3}/s (15,000 cu ft/s)
34. Maritsa - 383 m^{3}/s (13,500 cu ft/s)
35. Meuse - 357 m^{3}/s (12,600 cu ft/s)
36. Dniester - 313 m^{3}/s (11,100 cu ft/s)
37. Neretva - 240 m^{3}/s (8,500 cu ft/s)
38. Una - 240 m^{3}/s (8,500 cu ft/s) (tributary of Sava, which is a tributary of the Danube)
39. Great Morava - 232 m^{3}/s (8,200 cu ft/s) (tributary of the Danube)
40. Vardar - 170 m^{3}/s (6,000 cu ft/s)
41. Bosna - 163 m^{3}/s (5,800 cu ft/s) (tributary of Sava, which is a tributary of the Danube)
42. Vrbas - 132 m^{3}/s (4,700 cu ft/s) (tributary of Sava, which is a tributary of the Danube)
43. Drina - 124 m^{3}/s (4,400 cu ft/s) (tributary of Sava, which is a tributary of the Danube)
44. Arda - 77 m^{3}/s (2,700 cu ft/s) (tributary of Maritsa)
45. Struma - 76 m^{3}/s (2,700 cu ft/s)
46. Iskar - 54 m^{3}/s (1,900 cu ft/s) (tributary of the Danube)
47. Yantra - 47 m^{3}/s (1,700 cu ft/s) (tributary of the Danube)
48. Mesta - 45 m^{3}/s (1,600 cu ft/s)
49. Tundzha - 32 m^{3}/s (1,100 cu ft/s) (tributary of Maritsa)
50. Kamchiya - 26 m^{3}/s (920 cu ft/s)

== See also ==
- List of rivers of Asia
- List of rivers of Africa
- List of rivers of the Americas
- List of rivers of Oceania
- List of drainage basins by area
- List of rivers by discharge
- List of rivers by length
- List of European rivers with alternative names
- European river zonation
- Geography of Europe
- Latin names of European rivers
- Sionne (river)
