= Ebbe power station =

Museum in Huskvarna, Sweden

Coordinates: 57°47′07″N 14°17′37″E

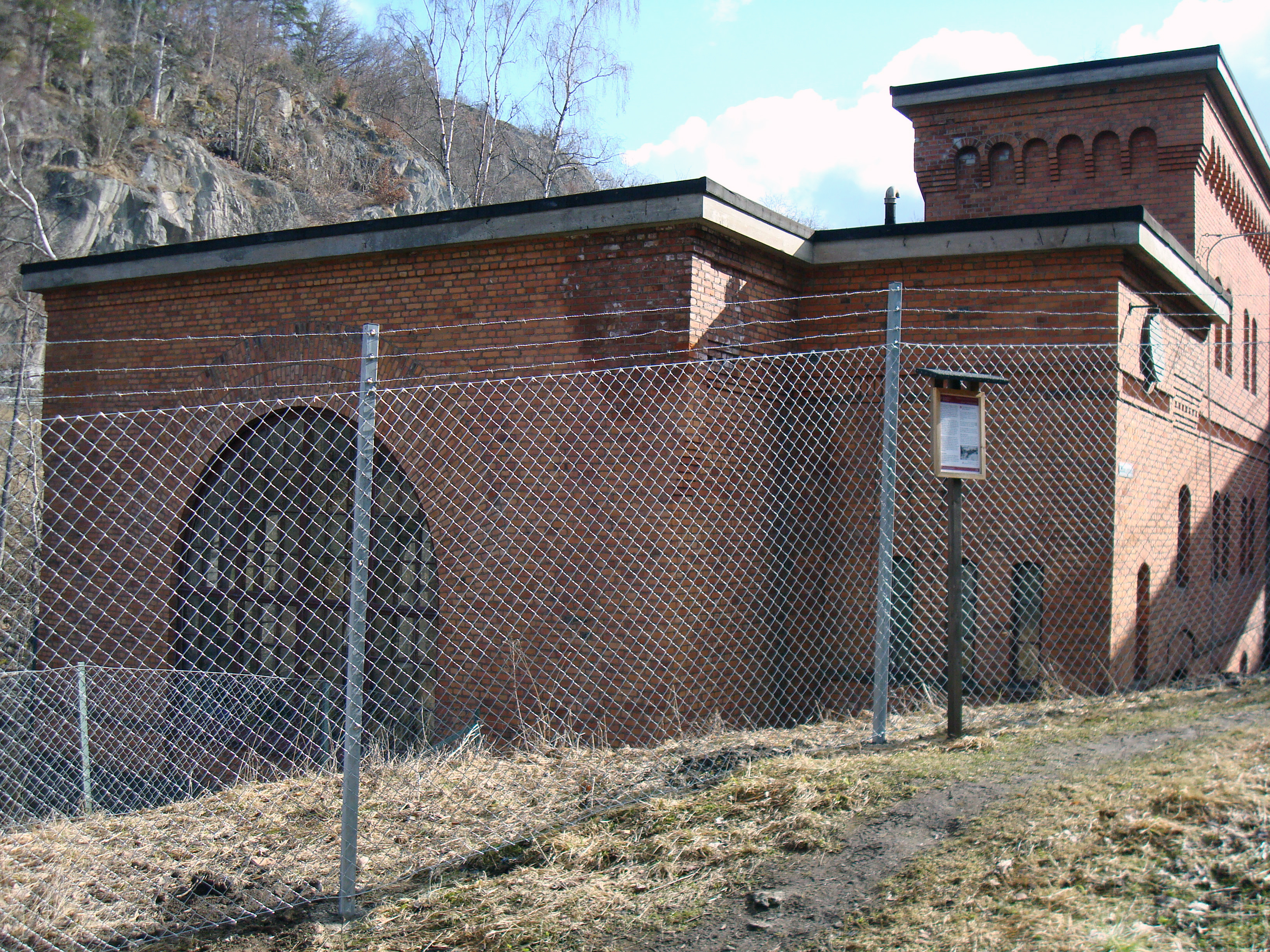
Ebbe power station

Ebbe power station (Swedish: Ebbes kraftstation) is a hydropower station on the Huskvarna River in Huskvarna, Sweden. It was in operation between 1906 and 1969 and served as an energy source for the Munksjö AB paper mill. Today, it is a technology museum maintained by Hakarps hembygdsförening. Parts of the buildings are heritage-listed and historically important.
