= Renau =

Renau may refer to:

== People ==
- Josep Renau (1907–1982), Spanish artist and communist revolutionary
- Maria Dolors Renau (1936–2019), Spanish politician

== Places ==
- Renau, Tarragona, Spain

== Other ==
- Renau (river), Germany
