= Namenlose =

River in Germany

Location
- Country: Germany
- State: North Rhine-Westphalia

Physical characteristics
- Mouth
  - location: Neger
  - coordinates: 51.2531°N 8.4694°E
- Length: 10.2 km (6.3 mi)

Basin features
- Progression: Neger→ Ruhr→ Rhine→ North Sea
- Tributaries
  - right: Strülleken

Namenlose is a river of North Rhine-Westphalia, Germany. It flows into the Neger in Siedlinghausen.

== See also ==
- List of rivers of North Rhine-Westphalia
