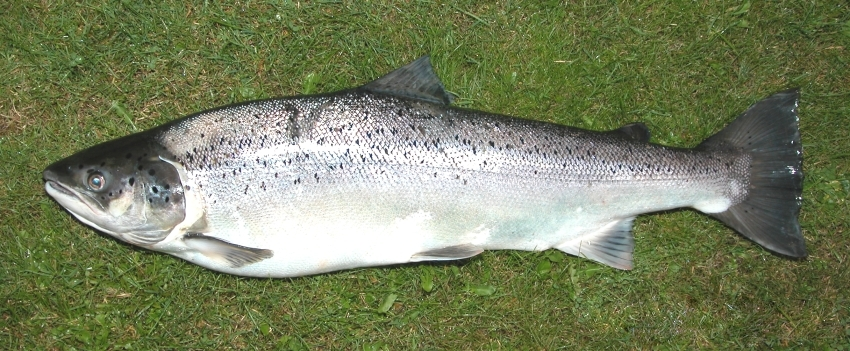
- Salmo trutta forma trutta

Conservation status
- Least Concern (IUCN 3.1)

Scientific classification
- Kingdom: Animalia
- Phylum: Chordata
- Class: Actinopterygii
- Division: Teleostei
- Order: Salmoniformes
- Family: Salmonidae
- Genus: Salmo
- Species: S. trutta
- Morpha: S. t. morpha trutta

Trionomial name
- Salmo trutta morpha trutta

= Sea trout =

Salmo trutta morpha trutta

Form of brown trout

Jumping sea trout

Sea trout is the common name usually applied to anadromous (sea-run) forms of brown trout (Salmo trutta), and is often referred to as Salmo trutta morpha trutta. Other names for anadromous brown trout are bull trout, sewin (Wales), peel or peal (southwest England), mort (northwest England), finnock (Scotland), white trout (Ireland) and salmon trout (culinary).

The term "sea trout" is also used to describe other anadromous salmonids, such as coho salmon (Oncorhynchus kisutch), coastal cutthroat trout (Oncorhynchus clarkii clarkii), brook trout (Salvelinus fontinalis), Arctic char (Salvelinus alpinus alpinus) and Dolly Varden (Salvenlinus malma). Even some non-salmonid fish species are also commonly known as sea trout, such as Northern pikeminnow (Ptychocheilus oregonensis) and members of the weakfish family (Cynoscion).

== Range ==
Anadromous brown trout are widely distributed in Europe along the Atlantic and Baltic coasts, the United Kingdom and the coasts of Iceland. They do not occur in the Mediterranean Sea but are found in the Black and Caspian Seas and as far north as the Barents and Kara Seas in the Arctic Ocean. Brown trout introduced into freshwater habitats in Tasmania, Victoria, New Zealand, Falkland Islands, Kerguelen Islands, Chile and Argentina have established anadromous populations when there was suitable access to saltwater. Anadromous behavior has been reported in the Columbia River and its tributaries in the U.S. and in Canadian rivers on both the Pacific and Atlantic coasts.

== Taxonomy ==
As treated here, the anadromous sea trout, Salmo trutta morpha trutta, is not taxonomically distinct from the freshwater-resident forms of the brown trout, i.e., the lacustrine S. t. morpha lacustris and the riverine S. t. morpha fario, although previously they have been considered different subspecies or even species. They represent ecological forms with different migration behaviour. Originally, the name Salmo trutta was used to refer specifically to the anadromous or sea-run forms of brown trout. Early angling literature often referred to sea trout as white trout or bull trout.

== Description ==
Anadromous brown trout are a silvery color with faint black spots. However, once they return to freshwater, they quickly take on the normal coloration of resident brown trout in preparation for spawning. Sea trout kelts (post spawn) return to their silvery stage as they migrate back to saltwater. Adult brown trout are between 35 and 60 cm (14 and 24 in) long, and can weigh from 0.5 to 2.4 kg (1.1 to 5.3 lb). Breeding males will develop a hook-like, upward-facing protrusion on the lower jaw called a kype. In freshwater, the top of the trout is an olive color with brown and black spots, with the ventral side being tan to yellow. The sides have many orange and red spots ringed with a light blue.

Their average length is 60 cm, but they can grow up to 130 cm in length, and weigh up to 20 kg under favourable habitat conditions.

Their most striking feature is the long, elongated, torpedo-shaped body. They have silver grey sides and grey-green backs. The belly is white. Like all trout species, the sea trout has an adipose fin.

== Life cycle ==
The sea trout feeds mainly on fish, small crabs, shrimps and prawns.

It is an anadromous, migratory fish which closely resembles the Atlantic salmon in its form and lifestyle. In the sea, it makes long journeys and also swims upstream into small rivers in order to spawn. Spawning occurs in winter on gravelly river beds in the grayling zone to the barbel zone. Their eggs are laid in troughs or redds. The young fish remain in freshwater for one to five years, and then make their way to the sea. The "inner clock" signals to the fish when they need to make their return journey to the sea. During this migration, they can cover up to 40 km per day.

Fish that are ready for spawning are usually lean and have to eat a lot of food in order to increase their energy levels as quickly as possible. After completion of the spawning process, the fish return to the sea. The mass mortality after spawning that is common in some species of salmon is not usual for brown trout. Once back in the sea, the fish regain their weight and lose their brown spawning colouring.

The surviving young of sea trout will generally migrate back to the sea, to feed in estuaries and coastal waters. However, it is also known that the adult brown trout, which may have spent some years entirely in a river, could, for whatever reason, decide to migrate to sea, to return next year as a much larger (sea) trout, with silver colouration.

== Threats ==
In many rivers of Central Europe, the sea trout have been extirpated because hydropower plants prevent spawning migration. In addition, many spawning grounds have disappeared because of the backflooding of rivers. In more recent times, sea trout have succeeded in re-establishing themselves in some lakes and rivers through the introduction of fish ladders and bypass channels around hydropower plants. In this way, spawning migration has been enabled again, albeit in a limited way.

== Angling ==
=== Germany ===
Sea trout are popular with anglers and as food. The close season lasts at least three months depending on river authority regulations. Like salmon, sea trout are protected by law in the Rhine river system and in most German rivers (except some northern German rivers) all year round. In the coastal waters of Schleswig-Holstein, sea trout are protected from 1 October to 31 December. This applies only to fish in spawning colour (brown), the silver-coloured fish may continue to be caught. In most estuaries, angling is completely prohibited in a protected area of 200 metres around the river mouth during this time. In the coastal waters of Mecklenburg-Vorpommern, there is a general prohibition on fishing for sea trout from 15 September to 14 December. This applies both to fishermen and anglers. In Germany, the term Absteiger is used by anglers to describe a sea trout after spawning. The removal of absteigers is a controversial topic among anglers. Most anglers refuse to take sea trout that have spawned because their meat is inferior and dry.

=== Wales ===
In North Wales the rivers Clwyd, Elwy and (to a lesser extent) Aled have runs of migratory trout, otherwise known as sea trout or, locally, sewin. Sewin generally refers to smaller sea trout up to around 30 – 40 cm in length. Fishing (angling) for sea trout is usually carried out at night using fly-fishing techniques, but only when the rivers are running clear. Sea trout are very easily "spooked" by bankside disturbance and, during daylight hours, tend to be tucked up under the banks and submerged tree roots, and are therefore very hard to catch. At night, they feel more confident to come out into the main river flow and can often be seen "running" (migrating upstream) in the shallow runs during the months of May to November. When the rivers are flowing coloured in a spate following heavy rain, it is possible to catch sea trout during the day with artificial lures or spinners. The fishing season for sea trout in the Clwyd catchment is from March 20 to October 17 inclusive. Many fly fishermen would agree that night fishing for sea trout can be one of the most exciting forms of the sport as the fish can grow to more than 10 lbs (5 kg) in weight. The Rhyl and St Asaph Angling Association controls 20 miles of river fishing on the rivers Clwyd, Elwy and Aled.
