= Kynsivesi – Leivonvesi =

Lake in Finland

Kynsivesi–Leivonvesi
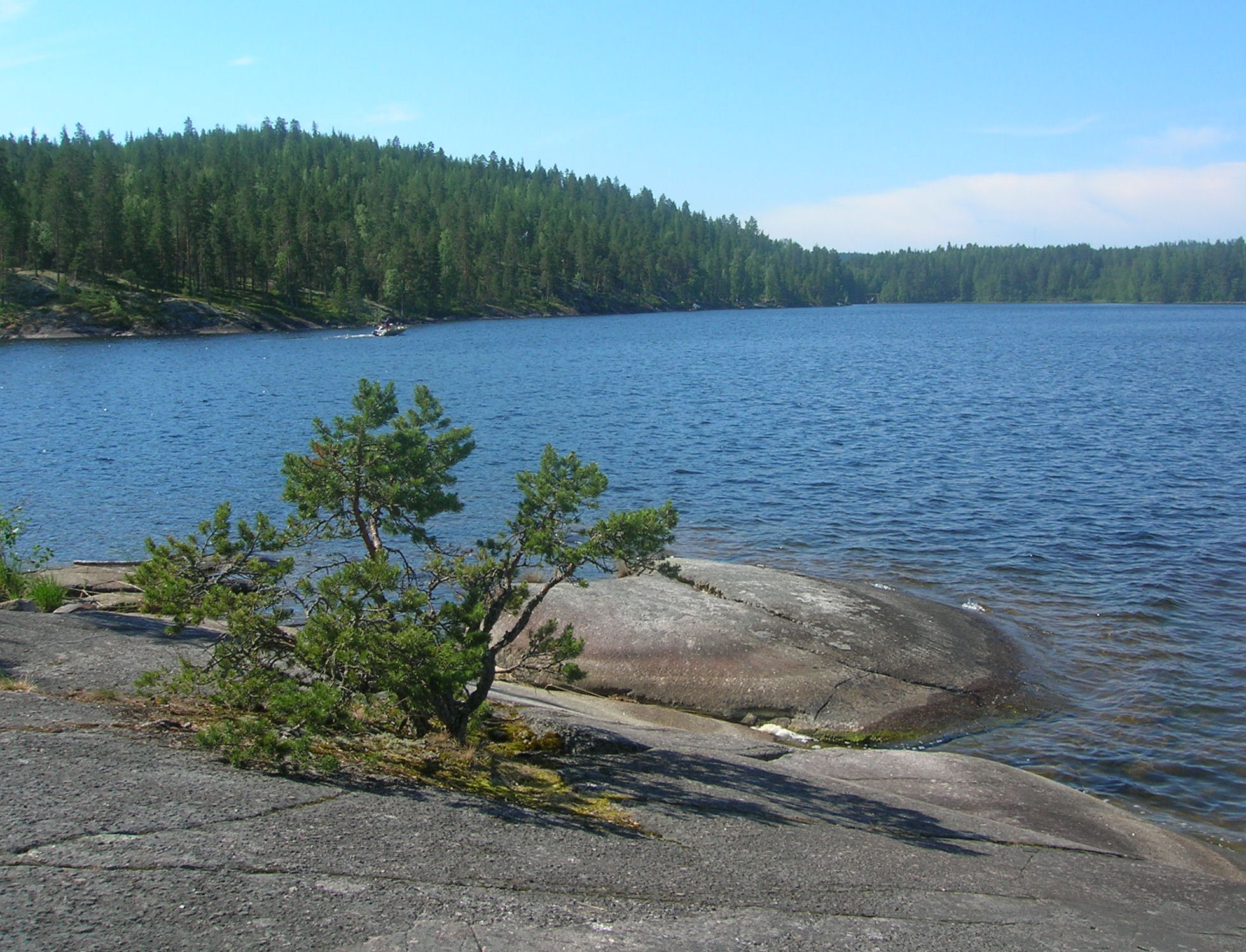

- Location within Finland
- Location: Hankasalmi, Konnevesi, Laukaa
- Coordinates: 62°25′N 26°15′E
- Primary outflows: Simunankoski rapids, to the lake Kuusivesi
- Catchment area: Kymijoki
- Basin countries: Finland
- Surface area: 54.134 km^{2} (20.901 sq mi)
- Average depth: 6.94 m (22.8 ft)
- Max. depth: 48 m (157 ft)
- Water volume: 0.376 km^{3} (305,000 acre⋅ft)
- Shore length^{1}: 188.1 km (116.9 mi)
- Surface elevation: 87.8 m (288 ft)
- Frozen: December–April
- ^{1} Shore length is not a well-defined measure.

Kynsivesi–Leivonvesi is a medium-sized lake of Central Finland, in the municipalities of Laukaa, Hankasalmi and Konnevesi. It belongs to the Kymijoki main catchment area. The outflow to the lake Kuusvesi is Simunankoski rapids.

== See also ==
- List of lakes in Finland
