= Rostojávri =

Lake on the border of Sweden and Norway

Råstojaure (Swedish); Rostojávri (Northern Sami); Storrostavatnet (Norwegian)
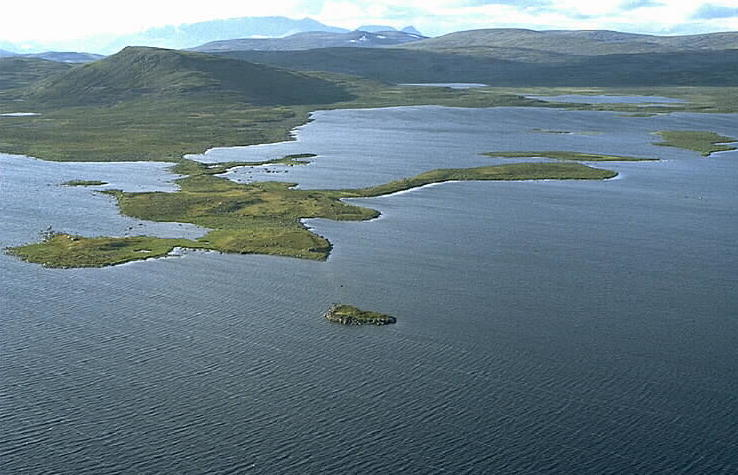
- Interactive map of the lake
- Location: Norrbotten, Sweden and Troms, Norway
- Coordinates: 68.8213°N 20.2794°E
- Basin countries: Sweden and Norway
- Max. length: 16 kilometres (9.9 mi)
- Max. width: 4 kilometres (2.5 mi)
- Surface area: 34.24 km^{2} (13.22 sq mi)
- Surface elevation: 680 metres (2,230 ft)
- References: NVE

Rostojávri (Northern Sami), Råstojaure (Swedish), or Storrostavatnet (Norwegian) is a lake on the border between Norway and Sweden. The Norwegian part of the lake (smaller) is located in Målselv Municipality in Troms county and the Swedish part of the lake (larger) is located in Kiruna Municipality in Norrbotten County. The Norwegian part of the lake lies inside Øvre Dividal National Park. The lake lies at an elevation of 680 metres (2,230 ft) and covers a total area of 34.24 square kilometres (13.22 sq mi); with 3.67 square kilometres (1.42 sq mi) located in Norway and the remaining 30.57 square kilometres (11.80 sq mi) are located in Sweden.

== Hydrology ==
The lake straddles two watersheds. To the northwest it drains into the river Rostaelva, a tributary of the river Målselva, which runs into the Atlantic Ocean. To the southeast it drains into the Rostoeatnu, a source river of the Lainio River, itself a tributary of the Torne River, which drains into the Bothnian Bay of the Baltic Sea.
