= Koivujärvi =

- Location within Finland
- Coordinates: 63°29′N 26°16′E
- Type: Lake
- Primary outflows: Kattilasalmi
- Catchment area: Kymijoki
- Basin countries: Finland
- Surface area: 26.073 km^{2} (10.067 sq mi)
- Average depth: 3.04 m (10.0 ft)
- Max. depth: 16 m (52 ft)
- Water volume: 0.0809 km^{3} (65,600 acre⋅ft)
- Shore length^{1}: 130.82 km (81.29 mi)
- Surface elevation: 130.8 m (429 ft)
- Frozen: December–April
- Islands: Huutsaari, Hämeensaari, Vuohensaari, Syvänsaari
- ^{1} Shore length is not a well-defined measure.

Koivujärvi is a medium-sized lake in Finland. It belongs to Kymijoki main catchment area and it is situated in Kiuruvesi municipality, North Savo region. It is one of the northeast lakes belonging to the Kymijoki basin. Koivujärvi is a common name. There are 21 lakes with this name in Finland. Koivujärvi in Kiuruvesi is the biggest of these lakes.

== See also ==
- List of lakes in Finland
