= Tereshka =

Bolshaya Tereshka River
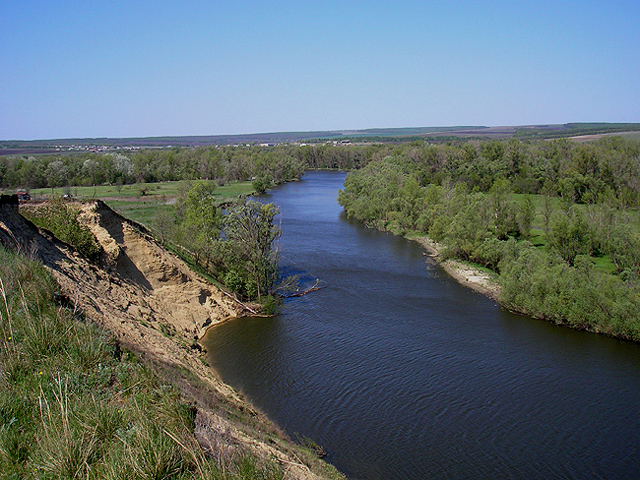
- Tereshka in the Podgorny District.

Location
- Country: Russia

Physical characteristics
- Source
  - location: Ulyanovsk Oblast
- Mouth: Volga
  - location: Volgograd Reservoir near Marks
  - coordinates: 51°49′1″N 46°32′33″E
- Length: 273 km (170 mi)
- Basin size: 9,680 km^{2} (3,740 sq mi)
- Discharge
  - average: 17.5 m^{3}/s (620 cu ft/s) recorded 46 km (29 mi) from mouth

Basin features
- Progression: Volga→ Caspian Sea

The Bolshaya Tereshka (Russian: Большая Терешка) or simply Tereshka is a river in the Ulyanovsk and Saratov oblasts of the Russian Federation, a right tributary of the Volga. The Tereshka is 273 kilometres (170 mi) long, and its watershed covers 9,680 square kilometres (3,740 mi^{2}). It begins in the Privolzhskaya Hills and flows to the Volgograd Reservoir. Ice on the Tereshka forms in November or December and thaws in March or April.
