= Lainio River =

Coordinates: 68°32′15″N 21°2′29″E

Lainio River Lainioälven
- Native name: Lainionjoki (Meänkieli)

Location
- Country: Sweden

Physical characteristics
- Source: Råstojaure
  - elevation: 678 m (2,224 ft)
- Length: 266 km (165 mi)

The Lainio River (Swedish pronunciation: [ˈlǎjnɪɔ]; Swedish: Lainioälven; Meänkieli: Lainionjoki or Lainionväylä) is a river in Kiruna Municipality in the far north of Swedish Lapland. Its source is a mountain lake, Råstojaure (Meänkieli: Rostujärvi), which lies along the border with Norway. 200 km from its source, the Lainio River flows into the Torne River, which eventually flows into the Gulf of Bothnia. Towns along the River Lainio include Kangos, Övre Soppero, Nedre Soppero, Laanavaara, and Lainio.

The Lainio River is considered one of Europe's finest fishing rivers, and has abundant supplies of pike, European perch, grayling and trout, and salmon in July and August.
