= Renau (river) =

River in Germany

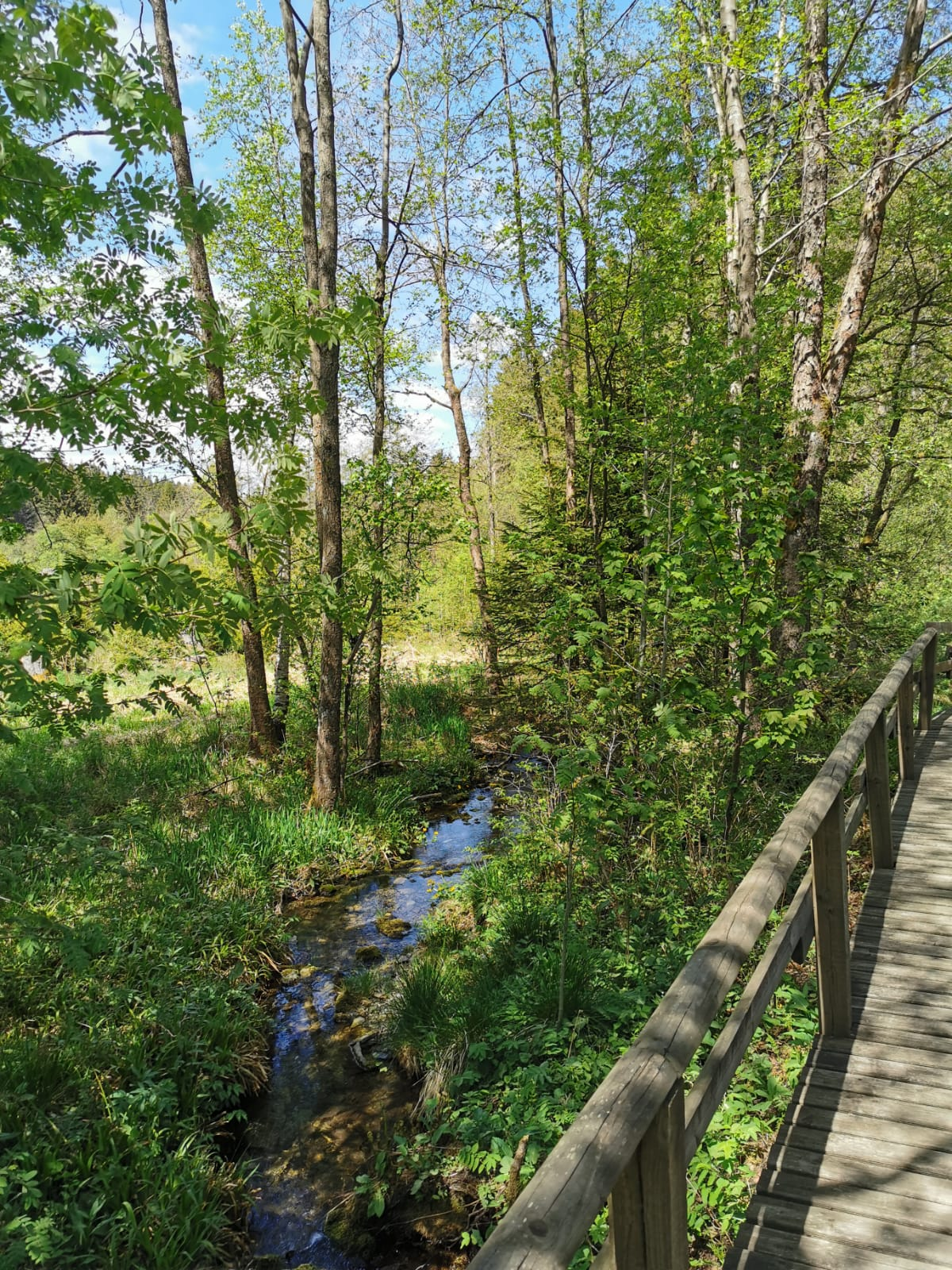

Location
- Country: Germany
- States: North Rhine-Westphalia

Physical characteristics
- Mouth
  - location: Neger
  - coordinates: 51.2200°N 8.4565°E

Basin features
- Progression: Neger→ Ruhr→ Rhine→ North Sea

Renau is a small river of North Rhine-Westphalia, Germany. It is 5.4 km (3.4 mi) long and flows as a right tributary into the Neger near Winterberg.

== See also ==
- List of rivers of North Rhine-Westphalia
