= European river zonation =

The classification of European rivers comes from the fish fauna found in them. Changes in taxonomic composition relate to physical and chemical changes that occur longitudinally.

== Zonation (from headwater to estuary) ==
=== Trout zone ===
This zone has a characteristic steep gradient, fast flowing water and cool temperature. The fast flow rate causes turbulence which keeps the water well oxygenated. Fish species found in this zone usually lay adhesive eggs that can stick to the substrate, this is to help prevent eggs being carried down stream by the water flow.

Characteristic fish species are:

- Brown trout (Salmo trutta)
- Atlantic salmon (Salmo salar)
- Bullhead (Cottus gobio)
- Loach (Barbatula barbatula)

=== Grayling zone ===
Similar in physical characteristics to the Trout zone, although the temperature is usually slightly higher. Fish species in this zone also lay adhesive eggs.

Characteristic fish species include all of the above species, with the addition of;

- Grayling (Thymallus thymallus)
- Minnow (Phoxinus phoxinus)
- Chub (Leuciscus cephalus)
- Dace (Leuciscus leuciscus)

=== Barbel zone ===
This zone is essentially lowland, but retains some characteristics of upland rivers. It has a gentle gradient with a moderate water flow and temperature. It also has a good oxygen content and a mixed substrate of silt and gravel in which plants can take root. Most of the fish species found in this zone lay their eggs in the vegetation on the river bed, this provides them with good protection and allows the eggs a good supply of oxygen given off from photosynthesis in the plants.

Characteristic fish species include all of the species from the previous zones with addition of;

- Barbel (Barbus barbus)
- Roach (Rutilus rutilus)
- Rudd (Scardinius erythrophthalmus)
- Perch (Perca fluviatilis)
- Pike (Esox lucius)
- Eel (Anguilla anguilla)

=== Bream zone ===
The true lowland zone, has a very gentle gradient and slow flowing water, there is usually good oxygen content but the temperature is much more variable than in the other zones. This zone has a silty substrate and is often turbid. Fish species found in this zone lay adhesive eggs in the weeds. Most upland fish species can not survive in this zone.

Characteristic fish species include only a few species from the Barbel zone (Roach, Rudd, Perch and Pike), with the addition of:

- Bream (Abramis brama)
- Tench (Tinca tinca)
- Carp (Cyprinus carpio)
