= Kuusvesi =

Lake in Laukaa, Finland

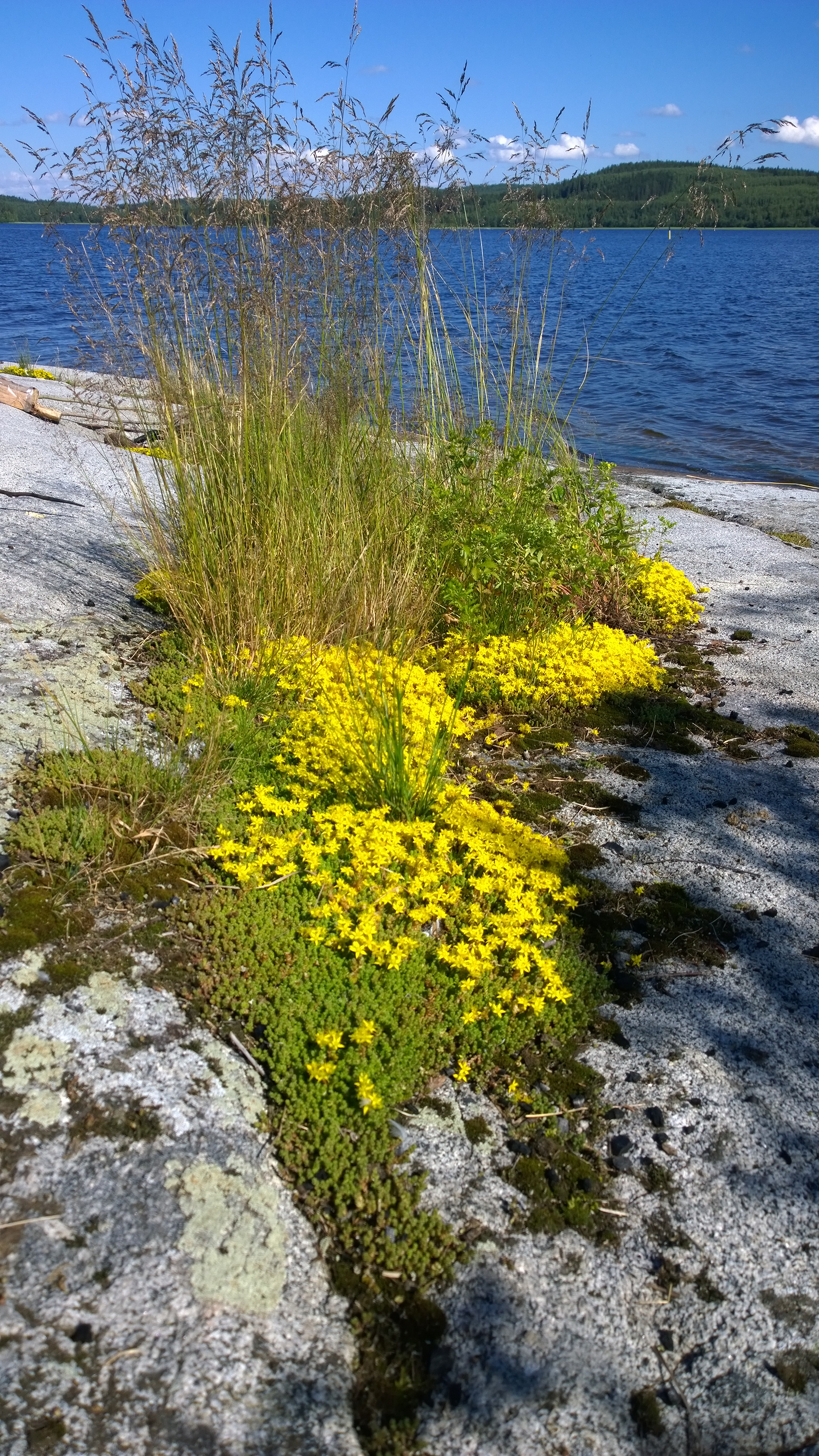

- Location within Finland
- Location: Laukaa
- Coordinates: 62°25′N 26°04′E
- Primary inflows: Simunankoski
- Primary outflows: Tarvaalanvirta
- Catchment area: Kymijoki
- Basin countries: Finland
- Surface area: 22.135 km^{2} (8.546 sq mi)
- Average depth: 5.89 m (19.3 ft)
- Max. depth: 28 m (92 ft)
- Water volume: 0.13 km^{3} (110,000 acre⋅ft)
- Shore length^{1}: 61.66 km (38.31 mi)
- Surface elevation: 84.8 m (278 ft)
- Frozen: December–April
- Islands: Kirkkosaari, Koskensaari, Kuhasaari, Kuussaari, Köyrinsaari, Lehtisaari, Mannunsaari, Pukkisaari, Renttusaari and Taipaleensaari
- ^{1} Shore length is not a well-defined measure.

Kuusvesi is a medium-sized lake of Central Finland, in Laukaa Municipality. It belongs to the Kymijoki main catchment area. The inflow to the lake Kuusvesi is Simunankoski rapids and the outflow is Tarvaalanvirta rapids, which are protected by the rapid protection program of Finland.

== See also ==
- List of lakes in Finland
