= Huskvarna River =

Coordinates: 57.78339°N 14.30462°E

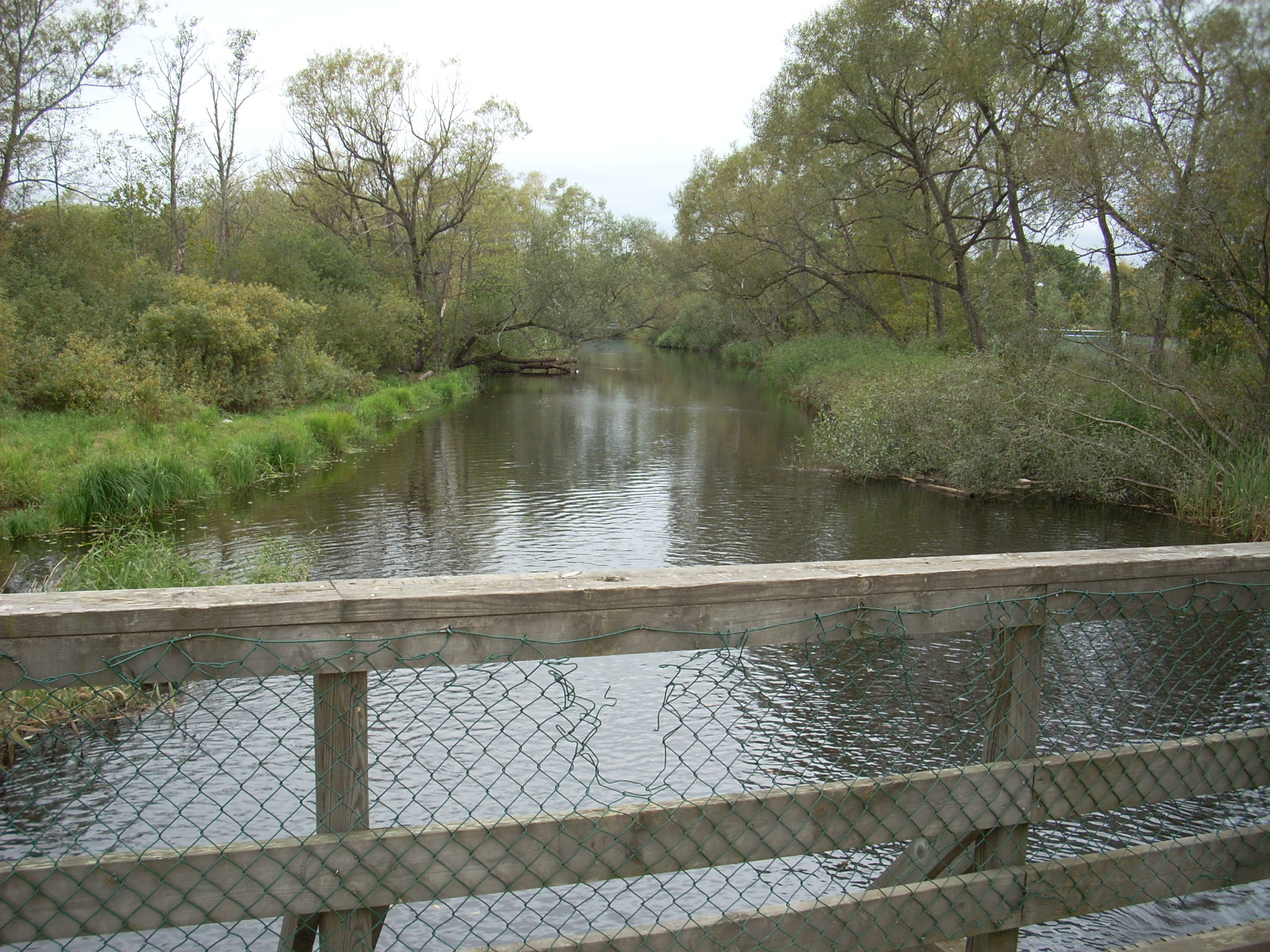
- Huskvarna River in September 2007
- Native name: Huskvarnaån (Swedish)

Location
- Country: Sweden
- County: Jönköping
- Municipalities: Jönköping, Nässjö

Physical characteristics
- Mouth: Vättern
- Basin size: 663 km^{2} (256 sq mi)
- Discharge
  - average: 6 m^{3}/s (210 cu ft/s)

Huskvarna River (Swedish: Huskvarnaån) is a river in Småland, Sweden.
