= Neger (Ruhr) =

River in Germany

Location
- Country: Germany
- State: North Rhine-Westphalia

Physical characteristics
- Mouth
  - location: Ruhr
  - coordinates: 51.4338°N 6.8856°E
- Length: 17.7 km (11.0 mi)

Basin features
- Progression: Ruhr→ Rhine→ North Sea

The Neger (German pronunciation: [ˈneːɡɐ]) is a southwestern or left tributary of the Ruhr in the Hochsauerlandkreis in North Rhine-Westphalia (Germany). After a generally northward course of 17.7 km[3] in length, it reaches a water flow of an average of 1.3 m³/s. Except for local areas and smaller sections, the river runs in landscape protection areas in the nature reserves Hömberg / Brusenbecke / Eberg / Kalte Spring, Neger- and Birautal nature reserve, Mittleres Negertal nature reserve and Negertal nature reserve.

== See also ==
- List of rivers of North Rhine-Westphalia
