= Rivers of classical antiquity =

Following is a list of rivers of classical antiquity stating the Latin name, the equivalent English name, and also, in some cases, Greek and local name. The scope is intended to include, at least, rivers named and known widely in the Roman empire. This includes some rivers beyond the bounds of the Roman empire at its peak.

== Map ==
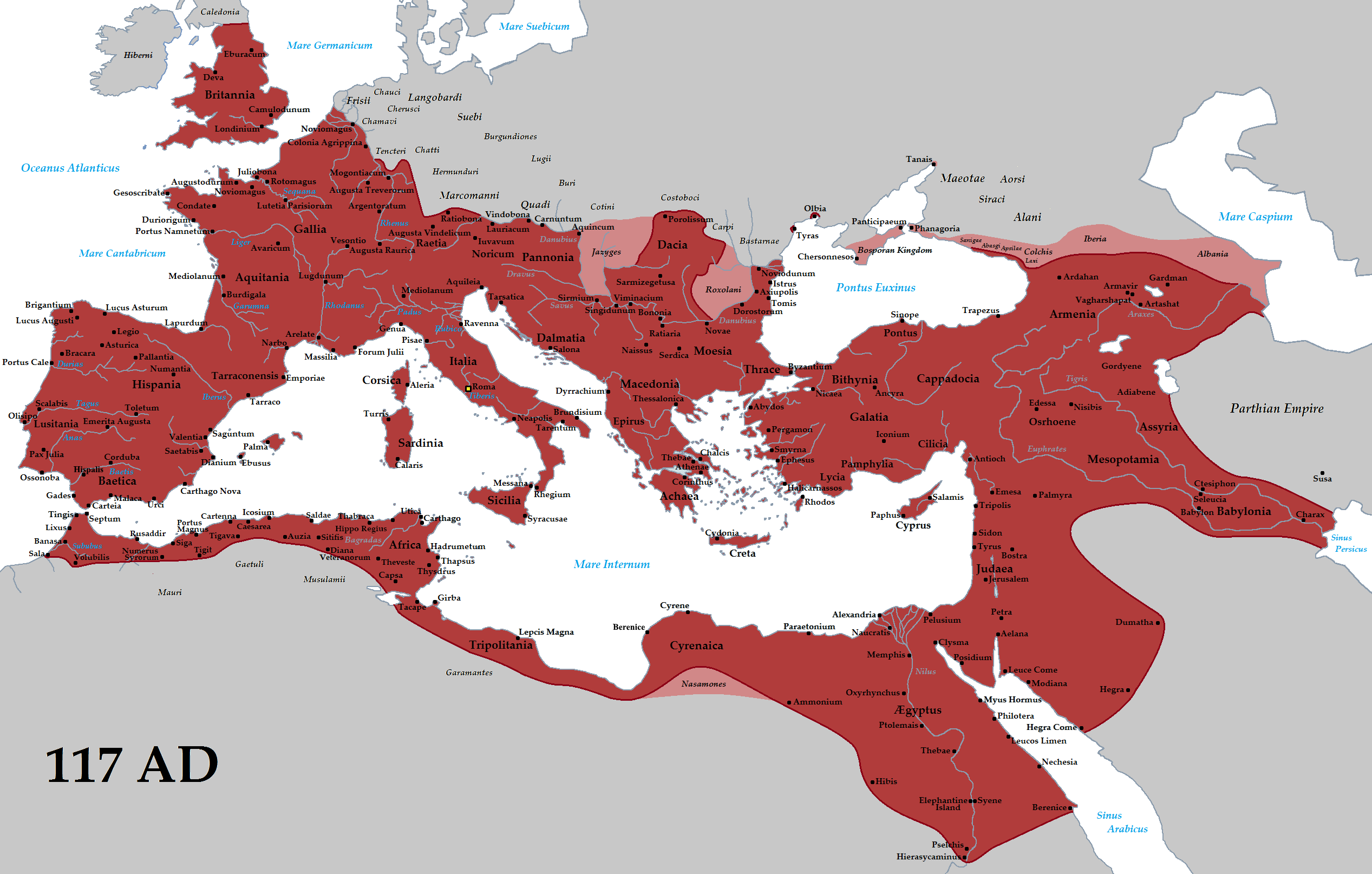
Map showing selected larger rivers, as of A.D. 117

For locations of rivers having coordinates below, see linked OpenStreetMap, by clicking on "Map all coordinates using: OpenStreetMap".

== Rivers ==
Rivers, with approximate regions, area:

Latin English, (other) and older names	Location	Note
Abdua, Addua; Adda	Italia; 45.134444°N 9.881667°E	Flows through Lake Como
Achelous¹; Acheloos (Achelous)	Thessaly? 38.331389°N 21.101389°E	
Aciris; Agri	Italia; 40.216667°N 16.733333°E	
Adonis; Nahr Ibrahim (Lebanon)	Syria; 34.062222°N 35.642222°E	
Adrana; Eder	Germania; 51.216677°N 9.455075°E	
Aenus, Oenus; Inn	Germania; 48.57353°N 13.47713°E	
Aesis; Esino	Italia; 43.65°N 13.366667°E	
Aesontius, Sontius; Soča (Isonzo)	Pannonia Superior? 45.994444°N 13.641389°E	
Alara; Aller	Germania; 52.102453°N 11.233703°E	
Albinia; Albegna	Italia; 42.5°N 11.183333°E	
Albis; Elbe (Labe, Łaba)	Germania; 53.922222°N 8.722222°E	
Alpheus¹; Alpheus (Alfeiós/Alpheiós)	Achaea? 37.6125°N 21.451667°E	
Alutus; Olt	Thracia? Moesia Inferior? 43.712778°N 24.800278°E	
Amber; Amper, Ammer	Germania; 48.500278°N 11.956667°E	
Amisia, Amisus; Ems	Germania; 53.325556°N 7.244722°E	
Amnias; Gök River	Bithynia and Pontus; 41.4077°N 35.1188°E	Site of Battle of the River Amnias in 89 B.C.
Ana, Anas; Guadiana	Hispania; 37.17°N 7.393611°W	
Anio; Aniene (Teverone)	Italia; 41.941745°N 12.50181°E	Tributary to the Tiber; water supply to expanding Roma.
Anisus; Enns	Noricum? 48.2369°N 14.519°E	Tributary to the Danube.
Apo; Caraş (Karaš)	Moesia Superior; 44.830833°N 21.316944°E	A left tributary to the Danube.
Arabo, Raba; Rába (Raab)	Germania; 47.684167°N 17.634444°E	
Arar; Saône	Gallia; 45.7275°N 4.817778°E	
Araros; Buzău	Dacia? 45.413611°N 27.741389°E	
Arauris; Hérault	Gallia; 43.2825°N 3.444167°E	
Araxes; Aras	Armenia? 40.0184°N 48.4535°E	
Arda; Arda	Italia; 45.034722°N 10.053611°E	
Ariminus; Marecchia	Italia; 44.066667°N 12.566667°E	
Armenta; Fiora	Italia; 42.333333°N 11.566667°E	
Arnus; Arno	Italia; 43.683333°N 10.283333°E	
Argessos, Argessus¹; Argeş	Dacia; 44.059167°N 26.616944°E	From Carpathians to the Danube. How different than Orgessos?
Arsia, Arsa; Raša (Arsia)	Dalmatia; 45.033°N 14.0471°E	
Arula; Aare	Germania; 47.6057°N 8.2234°E	
Arva; Orava	Germania Magna? 49.15°N 19.15°E	
Asis; Aso	Italia; 43.1°N 13.85°E	
Atax; Aude	Gallia; 43.2125°N 3.240278°E	From Pyrenees to Mediterranean near Narbo.
Aternus; Aterno	Italia; 42.469722°N 14.229722°E	
Atesis; Adige (Etsch)	Italia; 45.149722°N 12.320278°E	
Aufentus, or Aufidus; Ufente	Italia; 41.288127°N 13.195863°E	River, now channelized, through the former Pontine Marshes, where the Appian Way reached the sea.
Aufidus; Ofanto	Italia; 41.35°N 16.216667°E	
Auvona; Avon (Bristol?)	Brittania; 51.506111°N 2.718333°W	
Avens; Velino	Italia; 42.55°N 12.716667°E	
Axius¹; Vardar (Axiós)	Macedonia; 40.5075°N 22.7175°E	
Axona; Aisne	Gallia; 49.433611°N 2.846944°E	
Baetis; Guadalquivir	Hispania; 36.783333°N 6.35°W	
Bagradas; Medjerda River	Africa; 37.116667°N 10.216667°E	Site of several battles during the Punic Wars and later; see Battle of the Bagradas River.
Basana; Bosna	Dalmatia? 45.066667°N 18.466944°E	
Boactes; Vara	Italia; 44.15°N 9.883333°E	
Borysthenes; Dnieper (Dniepr)	Sarmatia; 46.5°N 32.333333°E	
Bradanus; Bradano	Italia; 40.383333°N 16.85°E	
Calipus; Sado	Hispania; 38.4894°N 8.92333°W	
Calor; Calore Irpino	Italia; 41.185°N 14.462778°E	
Calor; Calore Lucano	Italia; 40.505°N 15.019444°E	
Casuentus; Basento	Italia; 40.333333°N 16.816667°E	
Cephissus¹ (Athenae); Cephissus (Athens) (Kephissós, Kifissós)	Achaea; 37.938611°N 23.67°E	
Cephissus¹ (Boeotia); Cephissus (Boeotia)	Achaea; 38.432222°N 23.245278°E	
Cephissus¹ (Eleusis); Cephissus (Eleusis)	Achaea?	
Chalusus, Treva; Trave	Germania; 53.960833°N 10.887222°E	
Ciabrus; Tsibritsa	Moesia; 43.8142°N 23.5271°E	A right tributary of the Danube; divided Moesia Superior vs. Moesia Inferior
Clanis, Glanis, Clanius; Clanius Clanio, Lagni	Italia	
Clitumnus; Clitunno	Italia	A tributary of the Topino, which is a tributary of the Tiber. The spring which is the source of the Clitumnus was regarded a beautiful place by the Romans and later by Byron and Giosuè Carducci.
Clota; Clyde	Brittania; 55.679528°N 4.971306°W	
Colapis; Kupa (Kolpa)	Dalmatia? 45.46°N 16.402222°E	
Conovius; Conwy	Brittania; 53.3°N 3.833333°W	
Crathis; Crati	Italia; 39.723611°N 16.529167°E	
Crisus, Crisia; Körös (Criş)	Dacia? 46.717222°N 20.188333°E	
Crustumium; Conca	Italia; 43.966667°N 12.716667°E	
Cusus, Vagus; Váh (Vág, Waag)	Germania Magna; 47.916667°N 18.016667°E	
Danuvius, Danubius; Upper Danube (Donau, Duna, Dunaj, Dunav, Dunărea)	Multiple	Border of several regions of Roman Empire at times. Crossed by Trajan's Bridge, a world wonder. Some lower portion of the Danube was termed the Ister.
Dierna; Cerna	Dacia? 44.739444°N 22.412222°E	Dierna was a Roman fort at its confluence with the Danube.
Dubis; Doubs	Gallia; 46.900833°N 5.024167°E	
Duria maior, Duria Bautica; Dora Baltea	Italia; 45.1804°N 8.0477°E	
Duria minor Dora Riparia	Italia; 45.078611°N 7.725°E	A left tributary of the Padus.
Durius, Durias; Douro (Duero)	Hispania; 41.143333°N 8.669444°W	
Dravus; Drave (Drau, Drava, Dráva)	Pannonia? 45.543889°N 18.925278°E	
Euphrates; Euphrates	Parthia/Mesopotamia; 31.005°N 47.441944°E	
Feritor; Bisagno	Italia; 44.395131°N 8.943158°E	
Fertor, Frento; Fortore	Italia; 41.916667°N 15.283333°E	
Fevos; Varaita	Italia; 44.821111°N 7.607778°E	
Flosis; Potenza	Italia; 43.416667°N 13.666667°E	
Flusor; Chienti	Italia; 43.3°N 13.75°E	
Flussorius; Fiastra	Italia; 43.266667°N 13.466667°E	
Formio; Rižana (Risano)	Italia? 45.544871°N 13.755519°E	
Garumna; Garonne	Gallia; 45.041389°N 0.606667°W	
Genusus; Shkumbin	Macedonia; 41.039722°N 19.442778°E	
Gerros, Gerrus¹; Molochnaya	Sarmatia? 46.7014°N 35.2986°E	
Helinius; Helinium	Belgica; 51.730431°N 4.715881°E	
Hierasus¹; Siret	Dacia; 45.403056°N 28.024167°E	
Hypanis¹; Southern Bug (Boh, Buh)	Sarmatia; 46.983333°N 31.966667°E	
Iberus; Ebro (Ebre)	Hispania; 40.72°N 0.863056°E	
Idanus, Addua; Ain	Gallia; 45.795833°N 5.169444°E	
Ilargus; Iller	Germania; 48.381389°N 9.973056°E	
Indus; Dalaman River	Asia Minor; 36.70637°N 28.726726°E	Not to be confused with Indus River, the great river of Asia
Ira, Iria	Staffora; 45.0824°N 9.0294°E	
Iris; Yeşilırmak	Asia Minor; 41.3816°N 36.6603°E	
Isala, Sala; IJssel	Belgica; 52.582778°N 5.84°E	
Isara, Aesia, Oesia; Oise	Belgica?, Gallia; 48.986667°N 2.071389°E	
Isara, Isarus, Isargus; Isar	Germania; 48.803056°N 12.976389°E	
Isara; Isère	Gallia; 44.982222°N 4.852222°E	
Isarus, Isarcus; Eisack (Isarco)	Italia; 46.4412°N 11.3148°E	
Isaurus; Foglia	Italia; 43.916667°N 12.9°E	
Ister; Lower Danube (Donau, Duna, Dunaj, Dunav, Dunărea)	45.2175°N 29.761389°E	Some lower portion of the Danube, to its mouth on Black Sea. Danuvius was upper portion.
Julia, Licus; Gail	Germania? Gallia? 46.606389°N 13.887222°E	
Juvavus, Isonta; Salzach	Germania; 48.206667°N 12.929444°E	
Lametus	Amato	
Laus; Lao	Italia; 39.776667°N 15.794167°E	
Leontes; Litani River (Lebanon)	Syria; 33.338889°N 35.245278°E	
Licus, Lica, Licca; Lech	Germania; 48.735°N 10.936389°E	
Liger; Loire	Gallia; 47.269167°N 2.185833°W	
Limia; Lima	Hispania; 41.6824°N 8.8369°W	
Liquentia; Livenza	Italia; 45.583333°N 12.866667°E	
Liris, Clanis; Garigliano (Liri)	Italia; 41.216667°N 13.75°E	
Lupia, Luppia; Lippe	Germania; 51.650833°N 6.604167°E	
Lycus; Nahr al-Kalb (Lebanon)	Syria; 33.95°N 35.6°E	
Lycus; Kelkit River	Asia Minor; 40.765982°N 36.509179°E	Longest tributary of the Iris
Macra, Latis; Maira	Italia; 44.8403°N 7.65°E	
Macra; Magra	Italia; 44.05°N 9.983333°E	
Margus; Velika Morava (Serbia)	Moesia Superior; 44.711667°N 21.034722°E	
Marisus, Marisia; Mureş (Maros, Marusza)	Dacia; 46.251667°N 20.194167°E	
Mataurus, Metaurus; Metauro	Italia; 43.833333°N 13.05°E	
Meandrum, Meander; Büyük Menderes River	Asia; 37.54°N 27.168889°E	
Metaurus; Petrace	Italia	River in Calabria region.
Matrona; Marne	Gallia; 48.815833°N 2.411111°E	
Medoacus maior, Brinta; Brenta	Italia; 45.183333°N 12.316667°E	
Medoacus minor Bacchiglione	Italia; 45.183333°N 12.216667°E	
Moënus; Main	Germania; 45.183333°N 12.216667°E	
Minius; Minho (Miño)	Hispania; 41.866667°N 8.87°W	
Misco; Musone	Italia; 43.466667°N 13.633333°E	
Moldavia, Multavia; Vltava (Moldau)	Germania Magna; 50.341389°N 14.475°E	
Monda; Mondego River	Hispania; 40.213169°N 8.344792°W	
Moravia; Morava (Central Europe) (March)	Moesia Superior? 48.174167°N 16.975556°E	
Mosa; Meuse	Belgica, Gallia? 51.715°N 4.6678°E	
Mosella; Moselle	Belgica, Gallia?, Germania? 50.366111°N 7.606944°E	
Murus; Mur (Mura)	Germania; 46.298333°N 16.885833°E	
Naparis; Ialomița	Dacia? 44.698333°N 27.855833°E	
Naro; Neretva	Dalmatia? 43.021385°N 17.448328°E	
Natiso; Natisone	Italia, and? 45.9453°N 13.3647°E	
Natissis; Noteć (Netze)	Germania; 52.735833°N 15.405556°E	
Nicer; Neckar	Germania; 49.511944°N 8.437222°E	
Nilus; Nile	Ægyptus; 30.166667°N 31.15°E	
Nura; Nure	Italia; 45.0595°N 9.834°E	
Oenus; Inn	Germania? 48.57353°N 13.47713°E	
Ollius, Olius; Oglio	Italia; 45.044444°N 10.660278°E	
Oltis; Lot	Gallia; 44.316667°N 0.335°E	
Olubria; Scrivia	Italia; 45.0555°N 8.902°E	
Orbis; Orbe	Gallia?, Germania; 46.7373°N 6.5631°E	
Ordessos; Argeș	Dacia; 44.059167°N 26.616944°E	How different than Argessos?
Orontes; Orontes River (Lebanon)	Syria; 36.045278°N 35.963611°E	
Orgus; Orco	Italia; 45.183333°N 7.875°E	
Panticapes; Inhul	Sarmatia; 46.966667°N 32°E	
Peneus¹ (Elea); Peneus (Ilia), (Pineiós/Peneiós)	Achaea; 37.805278°N 21.236667°E	
Peneus¹ (Tempe); Peneus (Tempe), (Pineiós/Peneiós, Salambria)	Achaea; 37.805278°N 21.236667°E	
Padus, Eridanus¹; Po	Italia; 44.9525°N 12.431944°E	
Phrudis; Bresle	Gallia; 50.062778°N 1.371111°E	
Pisaurus; Foglia	Italia; 43.916667°N 12.9°E	
Plavis; Piave	Italia; 45.842778°N 12.105°E	
Potentia, or Flosis? (Note: Potenza (river)article asserts Latin name is "Flosis.); Potenza	Italia; 43.416667°N 13.666667°E	
Pyretus; Prut	Sarmatia? or Dacia? 45.468889°N 28.207778°E	
Rhenus; Rhine (Rijn, Rhin, Rhein, Reno, Rein)	Germania; 51.981667°N 4.080556°E	
Rabon; Jiu (Zsil)	Thracia? 43.778056°N 23.813333°E	
Rha¹; Volga	Scythia? 45.833333°N 47.966667°E	
Rhodanus; Rhône	Gallia; 43.330833°N 4.845556°E	
Rubico; Rubicon (Pisciatello, Fiumicino, Rubicone)	Italia; 44.093029°N 12.395834°E	
Rura; Ruhr	Germania; 51.450833°N 6.722778°E	
Sabatus; Sabato	Italia; 41.133333°N 14.75°E	
Sabatus; Savuto	Italia; 39.033333°N 16.1°E	
Sabis; Sambre	Belgica, Gallia? 50.461944°N 4.870833°E	
Sabis; Selle	Gallia; 49.906944°N 2.280556°E	
Sabrina; Severn	Brittania; 51.461700°N 2.996500°W	Longest river in Brittania
Sagrus; Sangro	Italia; 42.233333°N 14.533333°E	
Sala; Franconian Saale	Germania? 50.055972°N 9.685°E	Franconian Saale, a tributary of the Moënus.
Sala; Saxon Saale	Germania; 50.12056°N 11.83056°E	Thurigian Saale, a tributary of the Albis.
Salsum; Guadajoz	Hispania; 37.73675°N 4.53476°W	A tributary of the Bætis.
Samara; Somme	Gallia; 50.1867°N 1.6431°E	
Samus; Someş (Szamos)	Dacia? 48.114°N 22.3394°E	A tributary of the Tisia.
Sangarius; Sakarya	Asia Minor; 41.1264°N 30.6489°E	
Sarius; Serio	Italia; 45.2581°N 9.6936°E	
Sarāvus; Saar	Belgica? 49.701389°N 6.569722°E	A right tributary of the Mosella
Sargetia; Strei	Dacia? 45.8514°N 23.0507°E	
Savus; Sava (Száva)	Dalmatia; 44.824167°N 20.443889°E	
Scultenna; Panaro (Scoltenna)	Italia; 44.926°N 11.4237°E	Right tributary to the Padus.
Secia; Secchia	Italia; 45.0624°N 11.0057°E	
Sena, Misus; Misa	Italia; 43.716667°N 13.216667°E	Mouth is at Sena Gallica, Roman colony that was southernmost point of Hasdrubal Barca drive to relieve Hannibal in the Second Punic War, before the Battle of Metaurus.
Silarus; Sillaro	Italia; 44.5786°N 11.8714°E	
Silarus, Silerus, Siler; Sele	Italia; 40.483333°N 14.933333°E	
Sequana; Seine	Gallia; 49.433889°N 0.206667°E	
Sesites, Sessites; Sesia	Italia; 45.133056°N 8.573333°E	
Siris; Sinni	Italia; 40.1529°N 16.6917°E	
Spreva; Spree	Germania Magna; 52.536111°N 13.208611°E	
Strymon¹; Struma (Karasu, Strimónis)	Macedonia; 40.785833°N 23.848889°E	
Stura; Stura di Demonte	Italia; 44.6512°N 7.8812°E	
Suasanus; Cesano	Italia; 43.713056°N 13.218333°E	
Sybaris; Coscile	Italia; 39.703056°N 16.460278°E	
Tagus; Tajo (Tejo, Tagus)	Hispania; 40.319722°N 1.6975°W	
Tamaca; Tâmega	Hispania; 41.082°N 8.293°W	
Tamarus; Tammaro	Italia; 41.15°N 14.833333°E	
Tamesis, Tamesa; Thames	Brittania; 51.4989°N 0.6087°E	
Tanager; Tanagro (Negro)	Italia; 40.633333°N 15.233333°E	
Tanais; Don	Sarmatia? or Scythia? 47.086389°N 39.238611°E	
Tanarus; Tanaro	Italia; 45.005556°N 8.769444°E	
Tarnis; Tarn	Gallia; 44.086111°N 1.0425°E	
Tarus; Taro	Italia; 45.0022°N 10.2558°E	
Tedanius; Zrmanja (Zermagna)	Dalmatia; 44.2017°N 15.5883°E	
Tessuinus; Tesino	Italia; 42.978333°N 13.875556°E	
Thader; Segura	Hispania; 38.096436°N 0.675658°W	
Tiberis, Tiber; Tiber (Tevere)	Italia; 41.7405°N 12.2334°E	
Tibiscus, Tibisis; Timiş (Temes, Tamiš)	Moesia Superior? or Dacia? 44.84805°N 20.635556°E	
Ticinus; Ticino (Tessin)	Italia; 45.143889°N 9.236667°E	
Tigris; Tigris	Parthia/Mesopotamia; 38.433333°N 39.772778°E	
Timacus; Timok	Moesia Superior? 44.213611°N 22.670278°E	A right tributary of the Danube.
Tinna; Tenna	Italia; 43.233333°N 13.783333°E	
Tifernus; Biferno	Italia; 41.983333°N 15.033333°E	
Tirinus; Tirino	Italia?	
Tisia; Tisza (Tissa, Theiss)	Dacia; 45.138056°N 20.2775°E	
Titius, Corcoras, Korkoras¹; Krka (Cherca)	Dalmatia; 43.7198°N 15.8526°E	
Tolerus, Trerus; Sacco	Italia; 41.516667°N 13.533333°E	
Trebia; Trebbia	Italia; 45.0702°N 9.6849°E	
Trinius; Trigno	Italia; 42.066667°N 14.8°E	
Truentus; Tronto	Italia; 42.9°N 13.916667°E	
Tyras; Dniester (Dniestr, Nistru)	Sarmatia; 46.35°N 30.233333°E	
Umbro; Ombrone	Italia; 42.658611°N 11.013056°E	
Vacua; Vouga	Hispania; 40.683°N 8.667°W	
Varta; Warta (Warthe)	Germania; 52.5986°N 14.6103°E	A tributary of the Viadua, and connects to the Vistula by the Natissis and a canal (at least in modern times).
Varus; Stura di Lanzo	Italia; 45.0956°N 7.72472°E	
Varus; Var	Gallia; 43.653611°N 7.199722°E	
Viadua, Viadrua, Odera; Oder (Odra)	Germania; 53.671944°N 14.523611°E	
Visurgis; Weser	Germania; 53.535556°N 8.565556°E	
Vistula; Vistula (Wisła, Weichsel)	Germania Magna; 54.361667°N 18.951944°E	
Volturnus; Volturno	Italia; 41.091667°N 14.056667°E	
Vomanus; Vomano	Italia; 42.65°N 14.033333°E	

¹ - Latinized spelling of a Greek name.

== See also ==
- List of European rivers with alternative names
- Latin names of Portuguese rivers
- List of Roman place names in Britain
- Roman sites in the United Kingdom
- Romano-British
