= List of alternative names for European rivers =

All or almost all rivers in Europe have alternative names in different languages. Some rivers have also undergone name changes for political or other reasons. This article provides known alternative names for all major European rivers. It also includes alternative names of some lesser rivers that are important because of their location or history.

This article does not offer any opinion about what the "original", "official", "real", or "correct" name of any river is or was. Rivers are listed alphabetically by their current best-known name in English. The English version is followed by variants in other languages, in alphabetical order by name, and then by any historical variants and former names.

Foreign names that are the same as their English equivalents may be listed, to provide an answer to the question "What is that name in...?".

== A ==
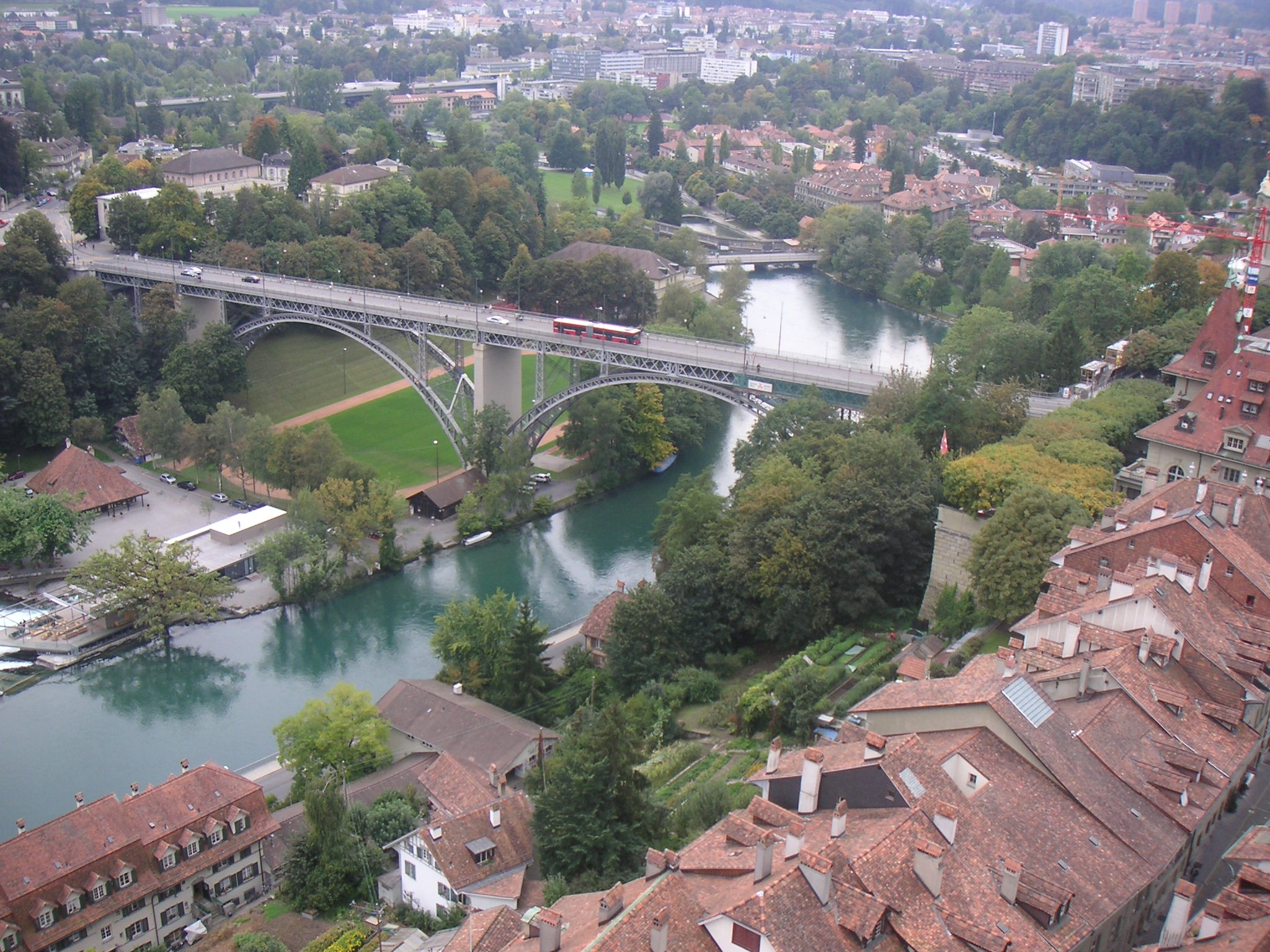
Aare at Bern

English name	Countries	Other name(s) or older name(s)
Aa	(France) 51.005833°N 2.104444°E	Aa (Dutch, French, West Flemish), Abbe (Picard), Agnio (Latin)
Aare	(Switzerland) 47.6057°N 8.2234°E	Aar (French, Italian), Aara (Romansh, Czech), Aare (Alemannish, German), Abrinca, Arola or Arula (Latin)
Achelous	(Greece) 38.331389°N 21.101389°E	Achelôios - Ἀχελῷος (ancient Greek), Achelóos - Αχελώος (modern Greek), Acheloos (German, alternative English), Acheloös (Dutch), Achéloos or Achéloüs (French), Achelous (Latin), Aheloos (Romanian), Aqueloo (Spanish form in mythology), Aspropotamo (Italian), Aspropotamos - Ασπροπόταμος (medieval Greek), Aspropótamos (Spanish), Axenus, Thestiu, and Thoas (possible earlier ancient Greek names)
Acheron	(Greece) 39.236111°N 20.476111°E	Acheron (Latin, German, Turkish), Acherōn - Ἀχέρων or Acherousios - Ἀχερούσιος (Ancient Greek), Achéron (French), Acherontas - Αχέροντας (modern Greek), Acheronte (Italian), Aheron (Romanian), Aheront (Croatian), Aqueront (Catalan), Aqueronte or Aquerón (Spanish), Gliqi or Frar (Albanian)
Adda	(Italy) 45.134444°N 9.881667°E	Abdua and Abadua (Latin variants), Ada (Lombard, Venetian), Adda (Italian), Addua (Latin)
Adige	(Italy) 45.149722°N 12.320278°E	Ades (Dolomitic Ladin), Àdexe (Venetian), Adige (Italian, French), Adigio (Spanish), Adis (Lombard), Adiža (Slovene), Adiže (Czech), Adyga (Polish), Athesis (Latin), Athyses - Αθυσης (Ancient Greek), Égg’ (Emiliano-Romagnolo), Etsch (German)
Adour	(France) 43.529444°N 1.523611°E	Ador (Occitan), Adour (French, German, Italian), Adur (Spanish), Aturri (Basque)
Ain	(France) 45.795833°N 5.169444°E	Addua, Danus, Idanus, Indus or Igneus (Neo-Latin), Ain (French), Hinnis (Old French)
Aire	(England) 53.7272°N 0.9067°W	Arus (Neo-Latin; 17th-century), Eyr and Eir (Middle English; 12th century), ðarcy and Yr (Anglo-Saxon; 10th century)
Aisne	(France) 49.433611°N 2.846944°E	Ainne (Picard), Aisne (French), Axona (Latin)
Akhurian	(Turkey) (Armenia) 40.1315°N 43.6484°E	Achurjan (German), Akhourian (French), Akhurean - Ախուրեան (Classical Armenian), Akhuryan - Ախուրյան (Armenian), Akhuryan - Ахурян or Arpachay Арпачай (Russian), Arpaçay (Turkish), ارپه چاى (Ottoman Turkish)
Alatyr	(Russia) 54.792°N 45.114°E	Alatyr - Алатырь (Russian), Rator - Ратор (Erzya and Mocksha Mordvin), Ulatăr - Улатӑр (Chuvash)
Alazani	(Georgia (country)) (Azerbaijan)	Alaz - Алаз (Chechen), Alazan - Ալազան (Armenian), Alazan - Алазан (Avaric), Alazani - ალაზანი (Georgian), Alazani - Алаза́ни (Russian), Dur - Дур (Tsakhur), Qanıx (Azerbaijani)
Albula	(Switzerland)	Albula (German), Alvra (Romansh)
Alfeios	(Greece)	Alfeo (Italian, Spanish), Alfios (German), Alphée (French), Alpheiós - Ἀλφειός (ancient Greek), Alpheus (Latin), Alphiós - Αλφειός (modern Greek), Rouphiás - Ρουφιάς (alternative Greek name)
Aller	(Germany)	Alera, Elera and Alara (Old Saxon/Neo-Latin; 8th-11th century), Aller (German)
Allier	(France)	Aleî (Auvergnat dialect of Occitan), Alèir (Occitan), Alier (Catalan), Allier (French), Elaver (Latin)
Altaelva	(Norway)	Alattionjoki (Finnish, Kven), Altaälven (Swedish), Altaelv (German), Altaelva (Norwegian), Álttáeatnu (Northern Sami)
Altmühl	(Germany)	Alcmona and Alcmana (8th-9th century), Altmühl (German)
Alzette	(Luxembourg) (France)	Alisontia (Latin), Alzette (French), Alzig and Elze (German, old), Uelzecht (Luxembourgish)
Amblève	(Belgium)	Ambleve (Walloon), Amblève (French), Amel (German)
Amper	(Germany)	Amber (Latin), Ammer (German; upstream river), Amper (German; downstream river)
Amstel	(Netherlands)	Aem or Aeme (Old Frisian), Aemstel (Middle Dutch; 12th-13th century), Amstel (Dutch)
Angrapa	(Russia) (Poland)	Angerapp (German), Angrapa - Анграпа (Russian), Angrapė (Lithuanian), Węgorapa (Polish)
Aniene	(Italy)	Anien, Anio or Tibero (Latin), Aniene or Teverone (Italian)
Aoös	(Albania) (Greece)	Aias/Aoös - Αίας/Αώος (modern Greek), Aōos - Αώος (Ancient Greek), Aous (Latin), Băiasa (Aromanian), Vjosa or Vjosë (Albanian), Vjosa (French, German), Voiussa (Italian), Vojuša - Војуша (Macedonian, Serbian), Vovousa - Βοβούσα (modern Greek alternative)
Arachthos	(Greece)	Arachthos (French, German, Italian, Spanish), Árakhthos - Άραχθος (Greek), Narta (Albanian)
Aragón	(Spain)	Aragó (Catalan), Aragoi (Basque), Aragon (French, Occitan), Aragón (Aragonese, Spanish), Aragonius (Latin)
Aras	(Turkey) (Armenia) (Iran) (Azerbaijan)	Arakhsi - არაქსი (Georgian), Araks - Արաքս (Armenian), Araks - Аракс (Russian), Aras (Turkish, German, Italian, Spanish), Aras - ارس (Persian), Araxe (French), Araxes (Latin, English variant), Araxes - Αράξης (ancient Greek), Araz (Azerbaijani), Erez (Kurdish), Rakhsi - რახსი (Old Georgian), Yeraskh - Երասխ (Classical Armenian)
Arda	(Greece) (Bulgaria)	Arda - Арда (Bulgarian), Arda (Turkish), Árdas - Άρδας (Modern Greek), Arpisos - Άρπησσος (Ancient Greek), Artiscus (Latin)
Ardèche	(France)	Ardecha (Occitan), Ardèche (French), Hentica? (AD 950)
Argens	(France)	Argenç (Occitan), Argens (French), Argenteus(Latin)
Argeș	(Romania)	Ardzhesh - Арджеш (Bulgarian), Argeș (Romanian), Argisch (German), Argyas (Hungarian), Ordessos and Argessus (Latin)
Ariège	(France)	Arièja (Occitan), Arieja (Catalan), Ariège (French), Aurigera(Latin)
Arieș	(Romania)	Aranyos (Hungarian), Arieș (Romanian), Goldfluss (German, rare)
Arno	(Italy)	Arno (Italian), Arnu (Sicilian), Arnus (Latin)
Arroux	(France)	Arotius, Isrus, Hesrus or Adrus (Latin), Arroux (French)
Aterno	(Italy)	Aterno (Italian; upstream part), Aternos - Άτερνος (Ancient Greek), Aternus and Piscarius (Latin), Pescara (Italian; downstream part)
Arve	(Switzerland) (France)	Arva (Latin), Arve (French)
Aube	(France)	Alba and Albis (Latin; 8th-9th century), Aube (French)
Aude	(France)	Atax (Latin), Aude (French, Catalan, Occitan),
Aulne	(France)	Alaunus (Latin), Aon (Breton, Welsh), Aulne (French)
Authie	(France)	Alteia (Latin), Authie (French), Eutie (Picard), Otie (Dutch)
Aveyron	(France)	Avairon (Occitan), Avario and Veronius (Latin), Aveyron (French)
Avon	(England)	Auvona (Latin), Bristol Avon (English variant)

== B ==
English name	Countries	Other name(s) or older name(s)
Bacchiglione	(Italy)	Bacajon (Venetian), Bacchiglione (Italian), Medoacus Minor (Latin)
Baïse	(France)	Baïsa (Occitan), Baïse (French), Banisia (Neo-Latin; 13th century), Vanesia (Latin; 4th century)
Bann	(Northern Ireland)	Bann Wattèr (Ulster-Scots), Bhanna (Irish)
Barrow	(Republic of Ireland)	Berua or Birgus (Latin), Bhearú (Irish)
Basento	(Italy)	Basento (Italian), Casuentus (Latin)
Bega	(Serbia) (Romania)	Bega (Romanian, German), Béga (Hungarian), Begej - Бегеј (Serbian, Bosnian)
Belaya (Kama)	(Russia)	Ağídel - Агыйдел (Tatar), Ağiźel - Ағиҙел (Bashkir), Aqedil - Ақеділ (Kazakh), Asho - Ашо (Erzya), Belaïa or Aguidel (French), Belaja (Dutch, German, Italian), Belaya - Бе́лая (Russian), Bélaya or Aghidhel (Spanish), Bila - Біла (Ukrainian), Osh Viche - Ош Виче (Mari), Töd’y Kam - Тӧдьы Кам (Udmur), Šur Atăl - Шур Атӑл (Chuvash)
Berezina	(Belarus)	Berezina - Березина (Russian, Ukrainian), Berezina (Czech, Lithuanian), Berezyna (Polish), Bjaresina (German), Byarezina - Бярэ́зіна (Belarusian)
Berkel	(Netherlands) (Germany)	Bekke (Achterhooks), Bercle, Bercla and Berclo (14th century), Berkel (Dutch, German, Low Saxon)
Berounka	(Czech Republic)	Beraun (German), Berounka (Czech), Mies (German; upstream, formerly entire river), Mže (Czech; upstream, formerly entire river), Plzenská reka, Radbuza, Watta (former Czech names)
Bîc	(Moldova)	Bîc or Bâc (Romanian), Bik or Bic (German), Byk - Бик (Ukrainian), Byk - Бык (Russian)
Biebrza	(Poland)	Bebras (Lithuanian), Biebrza (Polish), Bober (German variant), Бобра - Bobra (former? Belarusian, Ukrainian), Byebzha - Бебжа (Belarusian)
Biferno	(Italy)	Biferno (Italian), Tifernus or Phiternus (Latin)
Birs	(Switzerland)	Birs (Alemannisch, German), Birsa (Italian, Latin), Birse (French)
Bistrica	(Montenegro)	Bistrica (Montenegrin, Serbian, Croatian, Bosnian), Clear water (English)
Bistrița	(Romania)	Beszterce (Hungarian), Bistrița (Romanian), Bistritz (German), Nösen (archaic German)
Blackwater (Munster)	(Republic of Ireland)	An Abha Mhór (Irish), Auenmorus (Latin)
Blavet	(France)	Blabia, later Blavetum or Blavitta (Latin), Blavet (French), Blavezh (Breton, Welsh),
Bóbr	(Poland) (Czech Republic)	Bober (German), Bobr (Czech, Sorbian), Bóbr (Polish), Bobrawa (Lower Sorbian variant), Bubr - Бубр (Ukrainian)
Bodrog	(Hungary) (Slovakia)	Bodrog (Slovak, Hungarian), Bodrok (former Slovak variant)
Buna	(Albania) (Montenegro)	Barbana (Latin), Boiana (Italian), Bojana - Бојана (Montenegrin, Macedonian, Serbian), Boyana (Turkish), Boyna - Μπούνα (Greek), Buna (Albanian, Czech, French, German), Bunë (Albanian)
Bosna	(Bosnia and Herzegovina)	Basana / Bathinus (Latin), Bosna (Bosnian, Croatian), Bosna - Босна (Serbian), Bośnia (Polish)
Boyne	(Republic of Ireland)	Bhóinn or Abhainn na Bóinne (Irish), Boandus (Neo-Latin (13th-century), Bououinda - Βουουινδα (Greek, 2nd century)
Brda	(Poland)	Brahe (German), Brda (Polish, Czech)
Brenta	(Italy)	Brandau (German), Brenta (Italian, Venetian), Medeiochos - Μηδειοχος (ancient Greek), Medoacus Maior (Latin)
Bug, Southern	(Ukraine)	Aksu (Ottoman Turkish), Boh (Czech, Polish, Slovak), Boug méridional (French), Bug or Bugul de Sud (Romanian), Etelä-Bug (Finnish), Hypanis - Ύπανις (ancient Greek, Latin), Lõuna-Bug (Estonian), Pivdennyi Buh - Південний Буг (Ukrainian), Südlicher Bug (German), Yuzhnyi Bug - Южный Буг (Russian), Zuidelijke Boeg (Dutch)
Bug, Western	(Poland) (Belarus) (Ukraine)	Boug (French), Bug (Polish, English, German, Hungarian), Bug / Länsi-Bug (Finnish), Bug / Lääne-Bug (Estonian), Bug - בוג (Yiddish), Buga (Latin, Latvian), Bugas (Lithuanian), Zakhidyi Buh - Західний Буг (Ukrainian), Zakhodni Bug - Заходні Буг (Belarusian), Zapadnyi Bug - Западный Буг (Russian)
Buzău	(Romania)	Bodza (Hungarian), Buzau (German), Buzău (Romanian)

== C ==
English name	Countries	Other name(s) or older name(s)
Canche	(France)	Canche (French, Picard), Kwinte (Old Dutch), Quantia or Cancia (Latin)
Cetina	(Croatia)	Cetina (Croatian, Bosnian), Cetina - Цетина (Serbian), Cettina (Italian), Zetina (German (archaic))
Cehotina	(Montenegro)	Ćehotina (Montenegrin, Serbian, Croatian, Bosnian)
Charente	(France)	Carantonus (Latin; 4th century), Charanta (Occitan), Charente (French), Kanentelos - Κανεντελος (Ancient Greek; 140 AD).
Cheptsa	(Russia)	Čepca (Italian), Cheptsa - Чепца (Russian), Chupchi - Чупчи (Udmurt), Çüpçe - Чүпче (Tatar), Tcheptsa (French), Tschepza (German)
Cher	(France)	Caris, Carus, Chares, Charus (Latin), Char (Occitan), Cher (French)
Chiers	(France) (Belgium) (Luxembourg)	Chiers (French), Korn (German), Kuer (or Kar,Kor or Korn) (Luxembourgish)
Chusovaya	(Russia)	Chusovaya - Чусовая (Russian, Chuvash), Čusovaja (Italian), Tchoussovaïa (French), Tschussowaja (German), Tsjoesovaja (Dutch)
Cinca	(Spain)	Cinca (Aragonese, Catalan, Spanish), Cinga (Latin, 1st century BC), Nahr al-Zaytun (Arabic, 9th-century), Zinca (Aragonese; old spelling?)
Clyde	(Scotland)	Chluaidh (Scottish Gaelic, Breton, Irish), Cluda or Glota (Latin), Clud (Welsh), Clud or Clut (medieval Cumbric), Clyde (Scots)
Cogâlnic	(Ukraine) (Moldova)	Cogâlnic, Cunduc or Cogîlnic (Romanian), Kogelnik (German), Kogylnik - Когильник (Russian), Kohylnyk - Когильник or Kunduk - Кундук (Ukrainian)
Corrib	(Republic of Ireland)	Abhainn na Coiribe (English name translated in Irish), Galway River (Irish name translated into English), Ghaillimh (Irish)
Çoruh	(Georgia (country)) (Turkey)	Acampsis, Acampseon, Acapsis (Latin), Akampsis - Άκαμψις (Greek), Boas - Βωας (6th-century Greek), Boas, Chorokh and Churuk (former English), Ch'orokhi - ჭოროხი (Georgian, Mingrelian), Čorox - Ճորոխ (Armenian), Çorox (Azerbaijani), Çoroxi (Zazaki), Çoruh (Turkish), Tchorokhi (French)
Couesnon	(France)	Coetnum or Cossonis (Latin), Couesnon (French), Kouenon or C'houenon (Breton)
Crasna	(Hungary) (Romania)	Crasna (Romanian), Kraszna (Hungarian)
Creuse	(France)	Creuse (French), Crosa, Chrosa and Croza (8th-13th century neo-Latin) Cruesa (Occitan)
Crişul Alb	(Hungary) (Romania)	Bílý Kriš (Czech, Slovak), Crişul Alb (Romanian), Fehér-Körös (Hungarian), Weiße Kreisch (German)
Crişul Negru	(Hungary) (Romania)	Černý Kriš (Czech), Čierny Kriš (Slovak), Crişul Negru (Romanian), Fekete-Körös (Hungarian), Schwarze Kreisch (German)
Crişul Repede	(Hungary) (Romania)	Bystrý Kriš (Slovak, Czech), Crişul Repede (Romanian), Schnelle Kreisch (German), Sebes-Körös (Hungarian)
Crna	(North Macedonia)	Cherna - Черна (Bulgarian), Cerna (Romanian, former English), Crna - Црна (Macedonian, Serbian), Erigon (Thracian), Erigonas - Εριγώνας (Greek), Erigonus (Latin)

== D ==
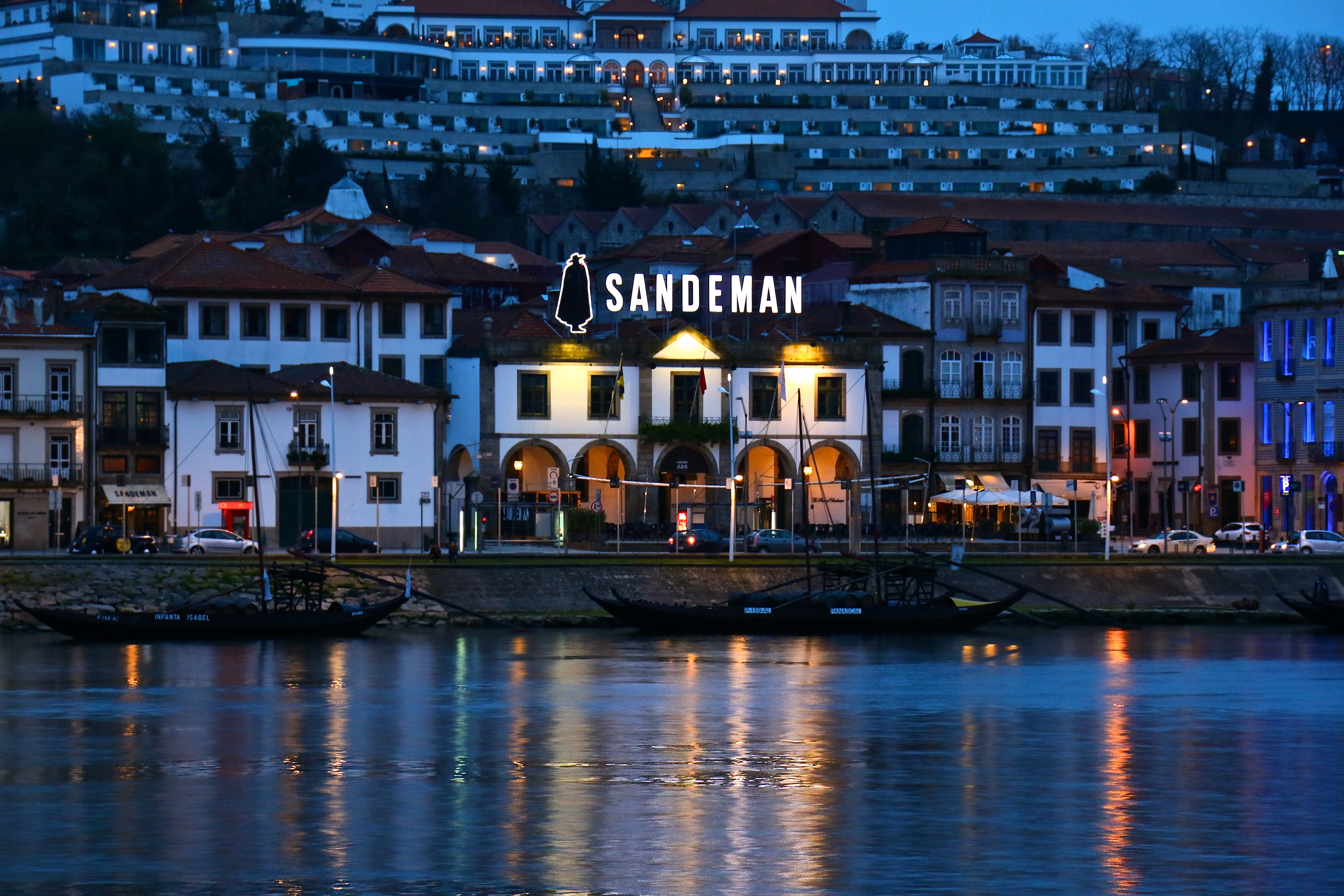
Douro at Porto

English name	Countries	Other name(s) or older name(s)
Dahme	(Germany)	Dahme (German), Dubja or Damna (Upper Sorbian)
Dalälven	(Sweden)	Dal River or Dalecarlia River (English), Dalälven (Swedish)
Dâmbovița	(Romania)	Dâmbovița or Dîmbovița (Romanian), Dymbowica (Polish), Izvoru Oticului and Oticu (Romanian; alternative for upper reaches)
Danube	(Romania) (Ukraine) (Moldova) (Bulgaria) (Serbia) (Croatia) (Hungary) (Slovakia) (Austria) (Germany)	Danav (Breton), Danóib (Irish), Danube (French), Danubi (Albanian, Catalan, Lombard, Occitan), Danubio (Italian, Spanish), Danúbio (Portuguese), Danuvius / Danubius (Latin; upper river), Doana (Bavarian), Dóná (Icelandic), Donaris (Dacian, upper river), Donau (Afrikaans, Danish, Dutch, German, Indonesian, Norwegian, Swedish), Donava (Latvian, Slovene), Donaw/Donwy (Welsh), Donnä (Alemannic), Donua (Old English), Dounavis - Δούναβης (Greek), Duna (Aromanian, Hungarian), Dunaj (Czech, Polish, Slovak), Dunaja (Romani), Dunărea (Romanian), Dunav - Дунав (Bosnian, Bulgarian, Croatian, Serbian), Dunay - Дунай (Russian, Ukrainian), Dunojus (Lithuanian), Hister or Ister (Latin; lower river), Istros - Ιστρος (Ancient Greek; lower river), Matoas (Thracian), Tonava (Finnish), Tuna (Turkish)
Daugava or Western Dvina	(Latvia) (Belarus) (Russia)	Daugava (Latvian, Estonian, French, Italian), Daugava or Västra Dvina (Swedish), Daugava or Westelijke Dwina (Dutch), Daugova (Latgalian, Samogitian), Dauguva (Lithuanian), Duina (Spanish), Duina Occidentalis (Latin), Duína Ocidental (Portuguese), Düna (German), Dvina Thiar (Irish), Dz'vina - Дзьвіна (Belarusian), Dźwina (Polish), Ntaounkava - Νταουγκάβα or Dytikos Ntbina - Δυτικός Ντβίνα (Greek), Väina (Estonian), Väinäjoki (Finnish), Vēna (Livonian), Western Dvina (alternative English name), Zakhidna Dvina - Західна Двіна (Ukrainian), Zapadnaya Dvina - Западная Двина (Russian), Západní Dvina (Czech, Slovak)
Dee, Aberdeenshire	(Scotland)	Abredea and Diona (Latin), Dee (Scots, Welsh), Dhè (Scottish Gaelic), Dhé (Irish)
Dee, Wales	(Wales) (England)	Dea/Deia/Deva/Deya (Latin), Dyfrdwy (Welsh, Breton, Scottish Gaelic)
Dender	(Belgium)	Dender (Dutch, West Flemish), Dendre (French), Tinre (Walloon)
Desna	(Ukraine) (Russia)	Desna - Десна (Russian, Ukrainian), Deyasna - Дзясна (Belarusian), Gyeszna (Hungarian)
Dinkel	(Netherlands) (Germany)	Deenkel (Low Saxon), Dinkel (Dutch, German)
Dnieper	(Ukraine) (Belarus) (Russia)	Borysthenes (early Latin), Borysthenes - Βορυσθενης (early Ancient Greek), Dānu apara or Dānu apr (Sarmatian), Danaper (late Latin), Danapres - Δαναπρης (late Ancient Greek), Danápris(Portuguese), Dinyeper (Turkish), Dneiperos - Δνείπερος (modern Greek), Dneper (Slovene), Dnepr (Danish, Estonian, Finnish, German, Norwegian, Swedish), Dnepr - Днепр (Russian), Dněpr (Czech), Dnieper (Italian), Dniéper (Spanish), Dnièper (Catalan), Dniepr (Polish), an Dnípir (Irish), Dnipro - Дніпро or Dniper - Дніпер (Ukrainian), Dnjepar (Bosnian, Croatian, Serbian), Dnjepr (Dutch), Dnyapro - Дняпро or Dnyepr - Днепр (Belarusian), Dnyeper (Hungarian), Exi (Tatar), Nipru (Romanian), Özü (Crimean Tatar), Slavuta or Slavutych (Old East Slavic), Var (Hunnic), *Varu-stāna (Scythian)
Dniester	(Ukraine) (Moldova)	Dānu nazdya (Sarmatian), Dinyester (Turkish), Dnesteros - Δνειστερος (modern Greek), Dnester (Slovene), Dnestr - Днестр (Russian), Dnestr (Estonian, Finnish, Swedish), Dněstr (Czech), Dniester (Italian), Dnièster (Catalan), Dniestr (Polish), Dnister (English variant), Dnister - Дністер (Ukrainian), an Dnístir (Irish), Dnjestar (Bosnian, Croatian, Serbian), Dnjestr (Dutch, Swedish), Dnyeszter (Hungarian), Ister (Thracian), Nester (Yiddish), Nistro (Italian, Portuguese), Nistru (Romanian), Thyras - Θυρας (Ancient Greek), tūra (Scythian), Turla (Turkish), Tyras (Latin), Danastro (Portuguese)
Dollart	(Netherlands) (Germany)	Doalert (Western Frisian), Dollard (Dutch, French), Dollart (German), Dollert (Low Saxon), Dullert (Low German, Saterland Frisian)
Dommel	(Netherlands) (Belgium)	Dommel (Dutch; Limburgish), Duthmala (Latin; 8th century)
Don	(Russia)	Don - Дон (Russian, Belarusian, Ukrainian), Don (French, German, Spanish, etc.), Silys (Scythian), Tăn - Тэн (Kabardian), Tanais (Latin), Tanaïs - Τάναϊς (Ancient Greek), Tyn - Тын (Tatar)
Don, Aberdeenshire	(Scotland)	Deathan (Irish), Devona (Latin), Dheathain (Scottish Gaelic), Don (Scots)
Donets	(Russia) (Ukraine)	Danets Данец (Belarusian), Donec (Italian), Donets (Dutch, French, Spanish), (Sívers'kyj) Donets Донець (Ukrainian), (Séverskij) Donets - Донец (Russian), Donez (German), Doniec (Polish), Donyec (Hungarian), Tanais Minor or Severiensis (Latin)
Dora Baltea	(Italy)	Deura Bàotia (Piedmontese), Djouiye (Valdôtain), Doire baltée (French), Dora Baltea (Italian, Lombard), Duère Baltèa or Duère (Arpitan), Duria Bautica or Duria Maior (Latin), Dzouëre (Valdôtain), Jouère Baltèa or Jouère (Arpitan)
Dora Riparia	(Italy)	Dòira Rivaria (Piedmontese), Doire Ripaire (French), Dora Riparia (Italian), Duria minor or Duria Ripuaria (Latin)
Dordogne	(France)	Dordogna (Breton, Italian), Dordogne (French), Dordoina (Basque), Dordoña (Spanish), Dordonha (Occitan, Portuguese), Dordonya (Catalan), Ḏornton - Ντορντόν (modern Greek), Duranius (Latin)
Dospat	(Greece) (Bulgaria)	Despatis/Despotis - Δεσπάτης/Δεσπότης (Greek), Dospat/Dospat dere - Доспат/Доспат дере (Bulgarian), Rata - Рата (alternative Bulgarian), Sura (Thracian)
Doubs	(France) (Switzerland)	Doubes - Δουβης (Ancient Greek), Doubs (Alemannisch, French), Dub (German), Dubis (Latin), Dubs (Franco-Provençal)
Douro	(Portugal) (Spain)	Douro (Galician, Mirandese, Portuguese, French), Duero (Aragonese, Asturian, Spanish, German, Italian), Durius (Latin)
Drac	(France)	Drac (French, Occitan), Dracum and Dravus (Neo-Latin, 11th-13th century), Drau (Occitan, 16th-18th century)
Drammenselva	(Norway)	Drammen River (English variant), Drammenselva (Norwegian), Drammenselven (Danish
Drava or Drave	(Croatia) (Hungary) (Slovenia) (Austria)	Drau (German), Draus (Latin), Drava (Bosnian, Croatian, Italian, Romanian, Serbian, Slovene), Dráva (Czech, Hungarian), Drave (German; rarely), Dravus (Latin), Drawa (Polish)
Drin	(Albania) (Kosovo) (North Macedonia)	Drilon (Latin), Drim - Дрим (Macedonian, Serbian), Drin (French, German, Italian, Turkish), Drini (Albanian)
Drina	(Montenegro) (Serbia) (Bosnia and Herzegovina)	Dreinos - Δρεινος (Ancient Greek), Drina (Bosnian, Albanian, Hungarian, Italian, etc.), Drina - Дрина (Serbian, Macedonian), Drinos - Δρινος (Greek), Drinus (Latin),
Drôme	(France)	Droma (Occitan, Breton, Catalan, Early Modern Spanish), Drôme (French)
Drut	(Belarus)	Drout (French), Druc (Czech), Drut’ - Друть (Russian, Ukrainian), Druts or Druć - Друць (Belarusian)
Drwęca	(Poland)	Drewenz (German), Druvinčia (Lithuanian), Drvenca (Latvian), Drventsa - Дрвенца (Ukrainian), Drwęca (Polish)
Dunajec	(Poland) (Slovakia)	Dohnst (German; archaic), Dunajec (Polish, Slovak), Dunajez or Dunajetz (German)
Durance	(France)	Drouentia - Δrουεντια (Ancient Greek), Druentia (Latin), Druenza (Italian, former), Durance (French, Piedmontese), Duranza (Spanish variant), Durença (Occitan)
Dvina, Northern	(Russia)	(Northern) Dvina (French, Norwegian, etc.), (Northern) Dwina (German, Polish), Paŭnočnaia Dzvina - Паўночная Дзвіна (Belarusian), Pivnichna Dvina - Північна Двіна (Ukrainian), Severnaya Dvina - Северная Двина (Russian), Vienanjoki (Finnish), Výnva - Вынва (Komi)
Dyle	(Belgium)	Dijle (Dutch, German, Luxembourgish), Dyle (French), Tîle (Walloon)
Dyoma	(Russia)	Dim - Дим (Bashkir, Tatar), Dioma (French, Italian), Djoma (German), Dyoma - Дёма (Russian), Kugiz̦el - Күгиҙел (Baskir alternative)
Dysna	(Belarus) (Lithuania)	Disna - Дисна (Russian), Dysna (Lithuanian), Dzisna - Дзісна (Belarusian)

== E ==
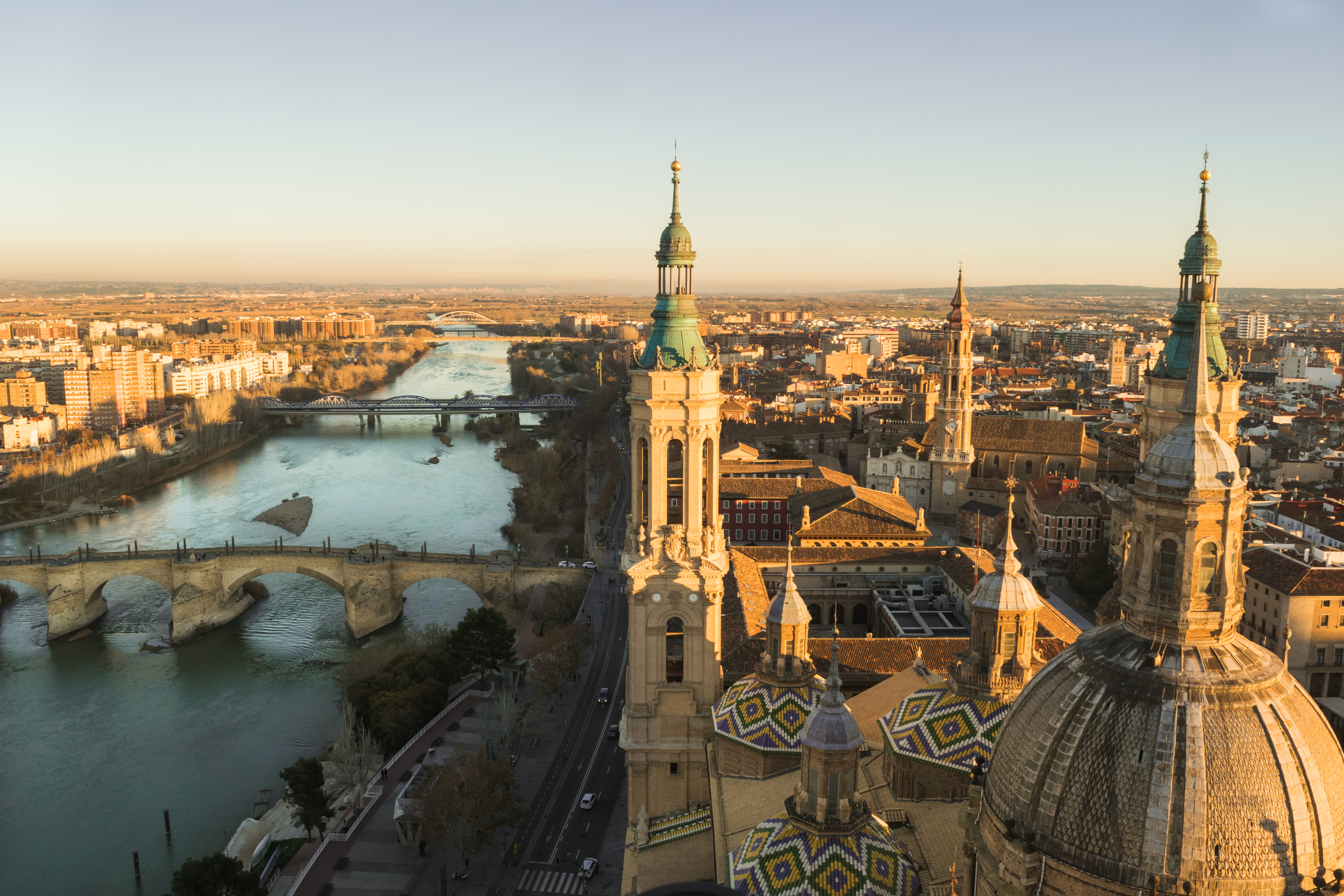
Ebro at Zaragoza

English name	Countries	Other name(s) or older name(s)
Ebro	(Spain)	Eabró (Irish), Ebre (Catalan), Èbre (French), Ebro (Spanish, Basque, Finnish, Galician, German, Hungarian, Italian, Polish, Portuguese, Swedish), Ebru (Romanian), Evros - Έβρος (modern Greek), Hiber - Ἴβηρ (Ancient Greek), Hiberus, Iberus or Oleum Flumen (Latin)
Eder	(Germany)	Adarna, Aderna or Adrina (Neo-Latin), Adrana (Latin), Edder (Hessian), Eder (German)
Eider	(Germany)	Aider (Low Saxon), Egdor or Egdore (Latin), Egða (Icelandic), Eider (German, Dutch, Northern Frisian), Ejderen (Danish)
Eisack	(Italy)	Eisack (German), Eisock (Tyrolean/Bavarian), Isarcho (Ladin), Isarchos - Ισαρχος (Ancient Greek), Isarci (Rhaetian), Isarco (Italian), Isarcus, Hisarcus or Isarus (Latin)
Elbe	(Germany) (Czech Republic)	Albis (Latin), Ælf (Old English), an Eilbe (Irish), Elba (Catalan, Croatian, Hungarian, Italian, Portuguese, Romanian, Spanish), El'ba - Эльба (Russian), Elbas - Έλβας (Greek), Elbe (German, Dutch, Finnish, Swedish, Turkish), Elben (Danish, Norwegian), Elv (Low German), Elve (Low Saxon), Ialew (Northern Frisian), Laba (Croatian, Serbian, Slovene), Łaba (Polish, Silesian), Labe (Czech, Slovak), Łobjo (Lower Sorbian, Upper Sorbian), Saxelfur (Icelandic)
Elde	(Germany)	Elde (German), Łada (historic Polish), Reecke (German; middle region)
Emajõgi	(Estonia)	Emajegi (Latvian), Emajegis (Lithuanian), Emajõgi (English, Estonian, Swedish), Emajõgi - Эмайыги (Russian), Emajoki (Finnish), Embach (German), Imäjõgi (Võro), Mētra (Latvian), Omovzha - Омовжа (Russian), Suur Emajõgi (Estonian)
Ems	(Germany) (Netherlands)	Amisia or Amisus (Latin), Amisos - Αμισος (Greek and Ancient Greek), Eems (Dutch, Low German, Low Saxon), Ems (German), Emže (Czech), Iems (Western Frisian), Oamse (Saterland Frisian)
Emscher	(Germany)	Amsara (Latin), Emscher (German), Iämscher (Low German)
Enguri	(Georgia (country))	Egry - Егры (Abkhaz), Enguri - ენგური (Georgian), Ēnguri - Էնգուրի (Armenian), Ingirc̣q̇ari - ინგირწყარი or Ingiri - ინგირი (Mingrelian), Ingouri (French), Inguri - Ингури (Russian), İnquri (Azerbaijani)
Enns	(Austria)	Anisus (Greek and Latin), Aniža (Slovene), Enns (Austro-Bavarian, German, Hungarian), Enža (Slovak), Enže (Czech)
Erne	(Republic of Ireland) (Northern Ireland)	Éirne (Irish, Manx), Erne (English, Welsh)
Esla	(Spain)	Aisela or Astura (Latin), Esla (Asturian, Galician, Spanish)
Eure	(France)	Autura or Ebura (Latin), Eure (French)
Eurotas	(Greece)	Basilipotamόs - Βασιλιποταμός (medieval name), Bomycas (earlier ancient Greek), Eurota (Italian), Eurotas (French, Latin, Spanish), Eurṓtas - Εὐρώτας (Greek), Evrotas (alternative English, German), Ewrotas (Polish), Himeras (earlier ancient Greek), Iri or Iris - Ίρις (medieval name for lower course),
Exe	(England)	Esk (Cornish), Isca (Latin), Wysg (Welsh)

== F ==
English name	Countries	Other name(s) or older name(s)
Fella	(Italy)	Bela (Slovene), Bělá (Czech), Fela (Venetian), Fele (Friulian), Fella (German, Hungarian, Italian)
Fiora	(Italy)	Armenta, Armine or Armino (Latin, old Italian until 13th century), Fiora (Italian)
Foglia	(Italy)	Foglia (Italian), Isaurus or Pisaurus (Latin)
Forth	(Scotland)	Abhainn Dubh, Abhainn Foirthe (Scottish Gaelic), Bodotria (Latin; Firth of Forth), Afon Gweryd (Welsh), Uisge For (lower part; Irish, Scottish Gaelic)
Foyle	(Northern Ireland) (Republic of Ireland)	Feabhal (Irish), Foyle (English)
Fulda	(Germany)	Fulda (German), Fuldaha (Latin), Gersfelder Wasser (German; upper regions)
Fyris River	(Sweden)	Sala River (Swedish)

== G ==
English name	Countries	Other name(s) or older name(s)
Gail	(Austria)	Cellia (medieval Latin (800 AD)) Gail (German, French, Italian), Geile (alternative German), Gila (medieval Latin (1090 AD)), Lica(s) or Licus (ancient Latin), Zeglia (former Italian), Zeie (Friulian), Zilja (Slovene)
Gardon	(France)	Gard or Gardon (French, Occitan), Vardo (Latin)
Garigliano	(Italy)	Gari-Lirano (historic Italian), Garigliano (Italian), Gariglianu (Sicilian), Liris, Caris lirianus and Clanis (Latin)
Garonne	(France)	Garona (Aranese, Basque, Occitan, Breton, Catalan, Croatian, Portuguese, Russian, Serbian, Spanish), Garonna (Italian, Polish), Garonne (French, Dutch, Finnish, German), Garounas - Γαρούνας (Greek), Garumna or Garunna (Latin)
Gauja	(Latvia) (Estonia)	Gauja (Latvian, Finnish, French, Lithuanian), Gauya - Гауя (Russian), Koiva (Estonian, Võro), Livländische Aa (German)
Gave de Pau	(France)	Gave de Pau (French, Occitan), Paueko uhaitza (Basque)
Genil	(Spain)	Genil (Spanish), Guad al-Xenil (later Arabic), Singilis (Latin), Sinyil / Sannil (early Arabic)
Gers	(France)	Ægirtius, Egircius, Gircius (Latin, 6th century), Gers (French, Occitan), Gersio (Latin; 817), Iercius (Latin, 13th century)
Geul	(Netherlands) (Belgium)	Geul (Dutch, Limburgish), Göhl (German), Gueule (French)
Gironde	(France)	Gironda (Catalan, Italian, Portuguese, Spanish), Gironde (French, Finnish), Zhironda - Жиронда (Russian), Zhyronda - Жыронда, Жиронда (Belarusian, Ukrainian), Žironda (Serbian), Żyronda (Polish)
Glâne	(Switzerland)	Glâne (French), Glane (German)
Glomma	(Norway)	Glåma (Norwegian local), Glaumr (Old Norse), Glomma (Norwegian, Swedish)
Göta älv	(Sweden)	Gautelfr (Old Norse), Gautelfur (Icelandic), Gøtelv (Norwegian variant), Göta älv (Swedish, Norwegian)
Guadalete	(Spain)	Kriso - Κρισω and subsequently Lethe - Λήθη (Ancient Greek), Guadalete (Spanish), Guadaletho (Andalusian), Wādi Lakkah وادي لكة (Arabic)
Guadalquivir	(Spain)	Baetis (Latin), Guadalquivir (Spanish, Catalan, Extremaduran, Finnish, Italian), Gwadalkiwir (Polish), Wādi l-Kabīr الوادي الكبير (Arabic)
Guadiana	(Spain) (Portugal)	Flumen Anas (Latin), Guadiana (Catalan, French, Hungarian, Italian, Portuguese, Spanish), Gwadiana (Polish), Oudiana or Odiana (Medieval Spanish), Wadi Ana (Arabic)
Gudenå	(Denmark)	River Guden (alternative English), Gudenå or Gudenåen (Danish)
Gurk	(Austria)	Gurk (German, French, Hungarian, Italian, Serbo-Croatian), Krka (Slovenian)
Gwda	(Poland)	Gwda (Polish, Czech), Küdde (German, Swedish)

== H ==
English name	Countries	Other name(s) or older name(s)
Haine	(France) (Belgium)	Haine (French), Hene (Dutch), Henne (German)
Haliacmon	(Greece)	Aliacmone (Italian), Aliakmon (French), Aliakmonas (German), Aliákmonas - Αλιάκμονας (modern Greek), Astraeus (possible Latin for upper river), Bistrica - Бистрица (Bulgarian, Macedonian), Haliacmon (Latin), Haliacmón (Spanish), Haliákmōn - Ἁλιάκμων (ancient Greek), Ince-Karasu or Inje-Kara (Ottoman Turkish), Vistritsa, Vistritza or Vistriza (former English, German)
Hase	(Germany)	Chasu (Latin), Haase (former German spelling), Hase (German, Low Saxon)
Havel	(Germany)	Habala / Habola / Havila (Latin), Habola (Sorbian), Hafelis (Lithuanian), Havel (German, French, Italian, Spanish), Havola (Czech), Hawela (Polish)
Hérault	(France)	Arauris or Araura (Latin), Erau or Eraur (Occitan, Catalan), Erauus (Neo-Latin), Ero - Эро (Cyrillic transliteration), Hérault (French)
Hornád	(Hungary) (Slovakia)	Gornad - Горнад (Russian, Ukrainian), Hernach (German), Hernád (Hungarian), Hornad (Polish), Hornád (Slovak, Czech, Romanian), Kundert (rare German variant)
Horyn	(Belarus) (Ukraine)	Goryn’ - Горынь (Russian), Haryn’ - Гарынь (Belarusian), Horin (Yiddish), Horyn’ - Горинь (Ukrainian), Horyń (Polish), Horyň (Czech)
Hron	(Slovakia)	Garam (Hungarian), Gran (German), Gron - Грон (Belarusian, Russian, Ukrainian), Hron (Slovak, Czech)

== I ==
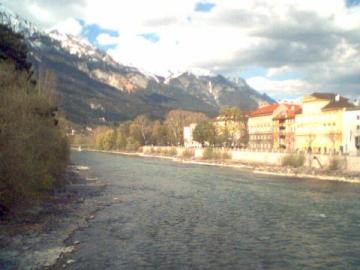
Inn at Innsbruck

English name	Countries	Other name(s) or older name(s)
Ialomița	(Romania)	Helibacia (Latin), Ialomița (Romanian), Jalomica or Ilonca (Hungarian), Jałomica (Polish), Naparis (Latin)
Ibar	(Serbia) (Kosovo) (Montenegro)	Ibar - Ибар (Serbian), Angrus (Latin), Ibar (Croatian), Ibër or Ibri (Albanian), İbre (Turkish)
Idrijca	(Slovenia)	Fetschenbach (German), Idria (Italian), Idrijca (Slovenian, Croatian)
Iijoki	(Finland)	Iijoki (Finnish), Ijo älv (Swedish)
IJssel	(Netherlands)	Iessel (Low Saxon), IJssel (Dutch), Isala (Latin), Isel (West Frisian), Issel or Ijssel (German), Yssel (French)
Ik	(Russia)	Ik - Ик (Russian), Iq - Ык (Tatar), Yq - Ыҡ (Bashkir)
Ilek	(Russia) (Kazakhstan)	Elek/Елік - Елек/Елік (Kazakh), Ilek - Илек (Russian)
Ill	(France)	Helella (Latin), Ill (Alemannic, French, German)
Iller	(Germany)	Hilara, Hilaria, and Ilargus (Latin), Iller (German)
Indalsälven	(Sweden)	Indalinjoki (Finnish), Indalsälven, Jämtlandsälven, Litsälven, and Storsjöälven (alternative Swedish names)
Indre	(France)	Andra, Anger, Endria or Inger (Latin), Endre (Occitan), Indre (French)
Inhul	(Ukraine)	Ingul - Ингул (Russian), Inhul - Інгул (Ukrainian), Panticapes - Παντικάπης (Ancient Greek)?
Inhulets	(Ukraine)	Ingulec (Polish), Ingulets - Ингуле́ц (Russian), Inhulets’ - Інгулець (Ukrainian), Inhulez (German), Hypakyris (Ancient Greek)?
Inn	(Germany) (Austria) (Switzerland)	Aenus (Latin), Ainos - Αινος (Ancient Greek), En (Romansh), Eno (Italian), Enus or Oenus (Medieval Latin), Inn (Austro-Bavarian, German)
Iori	(Azerbaijan) (Georgia (country))	Ioræ - Иорæ (Ossetic), Iori - იორი (Georgian), Iori - Иори (Russian), Kamyech - Կամբեճ(Armenian), Qabırlı (Azerbaijani), Qarbi - Къарби (Tsakhur)
Ipel/Ipoly	(Slovakia) (Hungary)	Eipel (German), Ipeľ (Slovak, Czech), Ipola (Polish), Ipoly (Hungarian), Jupol (archaic Slovak)
Isar	(Germany) (Austria)	Isar (German), Isara (Latin), Izar - Изар (Russian), Izara (Polish)
Isère	(France)	Isara (Latin), Isèra (Occitan, Catalan), Isère (French), Izera (Polish)
Iskar	(Bulgaria)	Iskar - Искър (Bulgarian), Iskăr (Romanian), İskar (Turkish), Oescus/Escus (Latin), Oiskos - Οἶσκος or Skios - Σκίος(Ancient Greek)
Isle	(France)	Eila (Occitan), Ella (Latin), Isle (French)
Isonzo	(Italy) (Slovenia)	Aesontius / Sontius (Latin), Aipsōntios - Αιψωντιος (Ancient Greek), Isonz (Lombard), Isonzo (Italian, French, German, Spanish), Isonzó (Hungarian), Lisonz (Venetian), Lusinç or Lisunç (Friulian), Soča (Slovene, Croatian, Czech), Sontig (historic German)
Izhma	(Bulgaria)	Ijma (French), Ischma(German), Izhma - И́жма (Russian), Ižma (alternative transliteration), Iźva - Изьва (Komi, Komi-Permyak)

== J ==
English name	Countries	Other name(s) or older name(s)
Jalón	(Spain)	Jalón (Spanish), Salo (Latin), Xalón or Exalón (Aragonese)
Jarama	(Spain)	Jarama (Spanish), Xarama (Latin)
Jeker	(Netherlands) (Belgium)	Geer (French), Jeker (Dutch, German, Limburgish), Neker or Eker (Maastricht dialect of Limburgish)
Jiu	(Romania)	Jiu (Romanian), Rabon (Latin), Schil or Schiel (German), Zsil (Hungarian)
Jizera	(Czech Republic)	Iser (German), Izera (Polish, Jizera (Czech, Slovak, Upper Sorbian)
Júcar	(Spain)	Júcar (Spanish), Sucro (Latin), Xúcar (Aragonese, Galician), Xúquer (Catalan, Valencian)

== K ==
English name	Countries	Other name(s) or older name(s)
Kalix	(Sweden)	Gáláseatnu (Northern Sami), Kaalasväylä and Kaihnuunväylä (Meänkieli), Kalix älv or Kalixälven (Swedish, Norwegian), Kalixjoki (Finnish), Kölisälva (Kalix dialect)
Kama	(Russia)	Cama or Kama (Latin), Čolman - Чолман (Mari), Çulman - Чулман (Chuvash, Tatar), Kam - Кам (Udmurt), Kama - Кама (Komi, Russian), Şolman - Шолман (Kazakh)
Kamchiya	(Bulgaria)	Kamchiya or Kamčija - Камчия (Bulgarian), Kamcia or Camcia (Romanian), Panisos - Πανισος (Ancient Greek), Ticha (Old Slavic)
Kem	(Russia)	Kem - Кемь (Russian), Kemijogi (Karelian), Kemijoki (Finnish)
Kemijoki	(Finland)	Giemajohka (Northern Sami), Kemi älv (Swedish), Kemijoki (Finnish)
Khopyor	(Russia)	Chopër (Italian), Chopjor (German), Jopior (Spanish), Khoper / Khopior (French), Khopra - Хопра (Mocksha), Khopyor / Khoper - Хопёр (Russian)
Klarälven	(Sweden) (Norway)	Clarus (Latin), Klara/Klaraelva (former Norwegian), Klarälven (Swedish), Trysilelva (Norwegian)
Klyazma	(Russia)	Clesma (Latin), Klaźma (Polish), Kliazma (French, Spanish), Kljasma (German), Kljazma (Czech, Dutch, Finnish, Italian), Klyaz'ma - Клязьма (Russian), Kľazma (Slovak), Malye Podbortsy - Малые Подборцы (Bashkir)
Kodori	(Georgia (country))	Kodor - Кодор (Russian), Kodori - კოდორი (Georgian), Kwydry - Кәыдры (Abkhaz)
Kokemäenjoki	(Finland)	Kokemäenjoki (Finnish), Kumo älv (Swedish)
Körös	(Hungary) (Romania)	Criş (Romanian), Crisius (or Grisia, Gerasus) (Latin), Keresz (Polish), Körös (Hungarian), Kreisch (German), Kriš (Bosnian, Croatian, Czech, Serbian, Slovak),
Kostroma	(Russia)	Kastrama - Кастрама (Belarusian), Kostrom (Veps), Kostroma - Кострома́ (Russian),
Kovda	(Russia)	Koundaälven (Swedish), Koutajoki (Finnish, Karelian), Kovda - Ковда (Russian)
Krka	(Slovenia)	Corcoras (Latin), Korka - Κόρκα (modern Greek), Korkoras - Κορκόρας (ancient Greek), Krainer Gurk (German), Krka (Bosnian, Croatian, Czech, French, Serbian, Slovene)
Krka	(Croatia)	Cherca (Italian), Corcoras or Titius (Latin), Katarbates - Καταρβάτης (ancient Greek; perhaps), Kerka (Hungarian), Krka (Bosnian, Croatian, Czech, Serbian, Slovene), Korkoras - Κορκορας (Ancient Greek),
Kuban	(Russia)	Hypanis (Latin), Hypanis - Ύπανις (ancient Greek), Kouban or Koubane (French), Kuban - Куба́нь (Russian), Psyzh" - Псыжъ (Circassian), Qoban - Кобан (Karachay–Balkar, Nogai), Q̇vbina - Къвбина (Abaza),
Kupa	(Croatia) (Slovenia)	Colapis or Calapius (Latin), Kolpa (Slovene), Kulpa (German, Hungarian), Kupa (Croatian, Bosnian), Kupa - Купа (Serbian)
Kura	(Azerbaijan) (Georgia (country))	Cyrus, Cyrrhus or Corius (ancient Latin), Gur - Կուր (Armenian), Khuar - Къуар (Ossetic), Koera (Dutch), Kor - Кор (Avar), Koura (French), Kür (Azerbaijani), Kura (Turkish, Italian, Spanish), Kura - Кура (Russian), Kyros - Κῦρος (ancient Greek), Mt'k'vari - მტკვარი (Georgian, Mingrelian), Mtkvari (alternative name in Western European languages))
Kymi	(Finland)	Kymi or Kymijoki (Finnish), Kymmene (Swedish)

== L ==
English name	Countries	Other name(s) or older name(s)
Laba	(Russia)	Laba - Лаба (Russian), Labæ - Лабæ (Ossetian), Labez̄ - Лабэжъ (Adyghe, Kabardian)
Laborec	(Slovakia)	Laborc (Hungarian), Laborec (Slovak), Laborets - Лаборець (Ukrainian), Labortz or Laborz (German; less common variants)
Laga	(Sweden)	Lafuan (17th-century Neo-Latin), Lagan (Swedish)
Lahn	(Germany)	Lahn (German), Laugana or Loganus (Latin)
Lambro	(Italy)	Lamber or Lambar (Lombard), Lambro (Italian), Lambrus or Labarus (Latin)
Latorica	(Slovakia) (Ukraine)	Latorca (Hungarian), Latorica (Slovak), Latoritsa - Латорица (Russian), Latorytsia - Латориця (Ukrainian)
Lech	(Germany) (Austria)	Lech (German, Bavarian), Lica, Licca, or Licus (Latin; between 500 and 1100), Likios or Likias - Λικιας (Greek; 2nd century)
Lee	(Republic of Ireland)	An Laoi (Irish)
Leine	(Germany)	Laginga, Lainegha and Lagina (Old Saxon or Neo-Latin; 10th-11th century), Leine (German)
Leitha	(Hungary) (Austria)	Lajta (Hungarian), Leita (Italian, Spanish), Leitha (German, French, Slovenian), Lîtaha (Old High German), Litava (Croatian, Czech, Slovak), Litawa (Polish), Sárviz or Sár (former Hungarian)
Lek	(Netherlands)	Lek (Dutch), Lokkia, Lokkiam and Loccham (Old Dutch and/or Neo-Latin; 8th-10th century)
Lielupe	(Latvia)	Kurländische Aa (German), Lėilopė (Samogitian), Lelupa (Polish), Lielupe (Latvian, French, Russian, Swedish), Lielupė (Lithuanian)
Liffey	(Republic of Ireland)	Anna Liffey (anglicisation of Irish Abhainn na Life), Libnius or Modanus (Latin), Life (Irish, Breton, Scottish Gaelic, Welsh), Ruirthech (Irish; pre-19th century)
Lim	(Montenegro)	Limnos (Greek), Limus (Latin), Lim (Montenegrin, Serbian)
Limmat	(Switzerland)	Limet (Alemannic), Limig (German; archaic), Limmat (German, Romansh), Limmig (Aargau dialect), Lindimacus and Lindimagus (Latin; 8th-9th century), Lindmagt/Lindmat (German; 15th-16th century), Linth (German; upper course)
Lippe	(Germany)	Lippe (German), Lupia, Lippa, Libia (Latin)
Livenza	(Italy)	Lighintha (local Friulian), Liquentia, Liguencia or Liquetia (Latin), Livence (Friulian), Łivensa (Venetian), Livenza (Italian)
Ljubljanica	(Slovenia)	Laibach (German), Ljubljanica (Slovene, Croatian), Ľubľanica (Slovak), Lublaňka or Lublanice (Czech), Lunghezza or Lubianizza (Italian), Nauportus - Ναύπορτος (Latin/Ancient Greek; 1st-century)
Ljungan	(Sweden)	Jångna or Aoa (Jamtlandic), Ljungan (Swedish), Ognar (Old Swedish; 15th century)
Ljusnan	(Sweden)	Ljusnan (Swedish), Lusn (Old Swedish; 14th century)
Loir	(France)	Ledus (Latin; 616 AD), Lez (Breton), Lidericus or Lœdus (Neo-Latin), Loir (French)
Loire	(France)	Léger, Leir or Leire (Occitan), Leira (Icelandic), Lêre (Arpitan), Liger (Breton, German (archaic)), Liger (Latin), Ligiras - Λίγηρας (Greek), Ligore (Old English), Loara (Bosnian, Polish, Romanian, Serbian, Slovene), Loira (Basque, Catalan, Czech, Italian, Slovak, Spanish), Lòira (Piedmontese), Loire (French, Danish, Dutch, Hungarian, Spanish), Luara (Lithuanian), Luara - Луара (Russian, Ukrainian)
Lot	(France)	Lot (French), Olt (former French), Òlt (Occitan, Catalan), Oltis (Latin; Roman time), Out (Occitan; variant and 13th century), Ulda and Ulta (Latin; 6th-7th century)
Lovat	(Russia) (Belarus)	Lovać - Ловаць (Belarusian), Lovat' - Ловать (Russian), Lovot - Ловоть (Old East Slavic)
Luga	(Russia)	Lauga jõgi (Estonian), Laugaz or Laukaa (Votic), Laukaa or Laukaanjoki (Finnish), Loukka (Ingrian), Luga - Луга (Russian)
Lule	(Sweden)	Julevädno or Lulejuädno (Lule Sami), Lule älv or Luleälven (Swedish, Norwegian), Luulajanjoki (Finnish)
Luza	(Russia)	Luz - Луз (Komi), Luza - Луза (Russian)
Lužnice	(Czech Republic) (Austria)	Lainsitz (German), Luschnitz (German, pre-1918 for Bohemian part), Lužnice (Czech)
Łyna	(Russia) (Poland)	Alle (German, French), Alna (Lithuanian, Old Prussian (13th century)), Lava - Лава (Russian), Lina (Latvian), Łyna (Polish)
Lys	(Belgium) (France)	Legia (Latin; 7th-century), Leie (Dutch, West Flemish, German), Lys (French)

== M ==
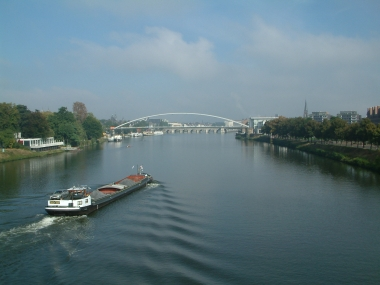
Meuse/Maas at Maastricht

English name	Countries	Other name(s) or older name(s)
Main	(Germany)	Main (German, Bavarian, Dutch, French), Maina (Latvian), Mainas (Lithuanian), Majna (Hungarian, Serbian), Mayn - Майн (Russian, Ukrainian), Mein (alternative spelling in French), Men (Polish, Piedmontese), Mèn (Lombard), Meno (Italian, Portuguese, Spanish), Moa (Bavarian variant), Moenis or Moenus (Latin, 1st century), Mohan (Czech, Slovak, Sorbian)
Malka	(Russia)	Bałqyps - Балъкъыпс (Kabardian), Balyksu - Балыксу (Russian, from Karachay-Balkar), Balyq - Балыкъ (Karachay-Balkar), Malka - მალკა (Georgian), Malka - Малка (Russian), Malq - (Ossetian)
Maritsa	(Greece) (Turkey) (Bulgaria)	Ebros (Thracian), Euros - Εύρος (Ancient Greek, used by Alcman c. 600 BC), Hebros or Evros - Έβρος (Ancient and Modern Greek), Hebrus (Latin), Marica or Evros (Italian), Marica (Croatian, Czech, Hungarian, Polish), Marița (Romanian), Maritsa - Марица (Bulgarian, Macedonian, Serbian), Mariza (German), Meriç (Turkish)
Marne	(France)	Marna (Czech, Italian, Occitan, Polish, Romanian), Marne (Dutch, French, German, Spanish), Matrona (Latin)
Medveditsa (Don)	(Russia)	Medveditsa - Медведица (Russian), Medwediza (German), Miadzviedzitsa - Мядзведзіца (Belarusian), Miedwiedica (Polish), Vedmeditsa - Ведмедиця (Ukrainian)
Mersey	(England)	Mærse (Old English; 1002 AD), Mersey (Irish), Merswy or Mersi (Welsh), Seteia (Latin; estuary)
Mezha	(Russia)	Meja (French), Mescha (German), Meža (Estonian, Lithuanian), Mezha - Межа (Russian), Mieża (Polish)
Meuse	(Netherlands) (Belgium) (France)	Helinius or Helinium (Latin; delta), Maas (Dutch, Danish, Frisian, German, Hungarian, Low Saxon, Swedish), Maas - Маас (Russian), Maes (Zeelandic), Maos (Limburgish), Mása (Slovak), Máza (Czech), Mesa - Меза (Macedonian), Meuse (French, Picard, Romanian), Moas (West Flemish), Mosa (Latin, Italian, Occitan, Portuguese, Spanish), Mouze (Walloon), Moza (Polish)
Mezen	(Russia)	Mesen (German), Mezen (French), Mezen' - Мезень (Russian), Mozyn - Мозын (Komi)
Midouze	(France)	Midosa (Catalan, Occitan), Midouze (Basque, French)
Mincio	(Italy)	Mens (Lombard), Menzo (Venetian), Minchios - Μίγχιος (Ancient Greek), Mincio (Italian), Mincius (Latin)
Minho	(Spain) (Portugal)	Minho (Portuguese, French, Mirandese), Minius (Latin), Miño (Galician, Spanish, Catalan, German, Italian)
Moksha	(Russia)	Ĭov - Йов (locally in Moksha), Măkshǎ - Мӑкшӑ (Chuvash), Moksha - Мокша (Moksha, Russian), Moksho - Мокшо (Mari), Mükşı - Мукшы (Tatar)
Moldova	(Romania)	Moldau (German), Moldavia (Italian, Portuguese, Spanish), Mołdawa (Polish), Moldova (Romanian, French), Mulduha and Mulduva (16th-century Romanian)
Molochna	(Ukraine)	Gerros - Γέρρος (Ancient Greek), Gerrus (Latin), Molochna - Молочна (Ukrainian), Molochnaya - Молочная (Russian), Molotchna (French), Molotschna (German), Tokmachka - Токмачка (Ukrainian; upper part)
Mondego	(Portugal)	Mondego (Portuguese, Asturian, Galician, Spanish), Mundas (Latin), Mundego (Mirandese)
Morača	(Montenegro)	Morača - Морача (Montenegrin, Serbian, Croatian, Bosnian), Moraça (Albanian), Oriundus? (Latin)
Morava (Moravia)	(Austria) (Slovakia) (Czech Republic)	Maraha (Latin, 9th-11th century), March (German), Marus (Latin), Morava (Czech, Slovak, French, Italian, Latin, Romanian, Slovene), Morawa (Polish), Morva (Hungarian)
(Great) Morava (Serbia)	(Serbia)	Brongos - Βρόγγος (Ancient Greek), Margus (Latin), (Velika) Morava - (Велика) Морава (Serbian, Bulgarian), (Golema) Morava - (Голема) Морава (Macedonian), Morava (Albanian, Bosnian, Croatian, Hungarian, Romanian, Slovene), Morawa (Polish)
South Morava	(Serbia) (North Macedonia)	Brongos - Βρόγγος (Ancient Greek), Balgarska Morava - Българска Морава (former Bulgarian), Bulgarian Morava (former English), Južna Morava - Јужна Морава (Macedonian, Serbian)
West Morava	(Serbia)	Angros - Ανγρος (Ancient Greek), Zapadna Morava - Западна Морава (Serbian, Bosnian)
Moselle	(Germany) (Luxembourg) (France)	Moezel (Dutch), Mosel (Alsatian, German, Hungarian, Ripuarian, Romanian, Swedish), Mosela (Czech, Portuguese, Spanish), Mosella (Italian, Latin), Mosel·la (Catalan), Moselle (French), Mosl (Bavarian), Mozel’ - Мозель (Russian), Mozela (Polish), Musalla (Latin), Musel (Luxembourgish)
Moskva	(Russia)	Mäskäü - Мәскәү (Tatar), Maskva - Масква (Belarusian), Moscou (Portuguese), Moscova (Spanish), Moscus or Moscua (Neo-Latin), Moskau (German alternate), Mosko - Моско (Mari), Moskova (French, Turkish), Moskuba - Москуба (Yakut), Moskva - Москва (Russian, Ukrainian), Moskva (Dutch, Finnish), Moskwa (German, Polish), Muskav - Мускав (Chuvash)
Msta	(Russia)	Msta - Мста (Russian), Mstanjogi (Veps), Mustajoki (historically Finnish & Estonian)
Mulde	(Germany)	Milda (Latin, 10th century), Módła (Lower Sorbian), Modłej (Upper Sorbian), Mulda (Czech, Polish)
Mur	(Hungary) (Serbia) (Slovenia) (Austria)	Muora (Latin, 10th century), Mur (German, Dutch, French, Romanian), Mura (Bosnian, Croatian, Czech, Hungarian, Italian, Serbian, Slovene), Müra or Möra (Prekmurje Slovene)
Mureş	(Hungary) (Romania)	Marisos - Μαρισος (Ancient Greek), Marisus (Latin), Maros (Hungarian), Marosh - Марош (Russian), Maroš or Maruše (Czech), Marusza (Polish), Mieresch or Marosch (German), Moriš (Bosnian, Croatian, Serbian), Mureş (Romanian), Mureš (Slovak)

== N ==
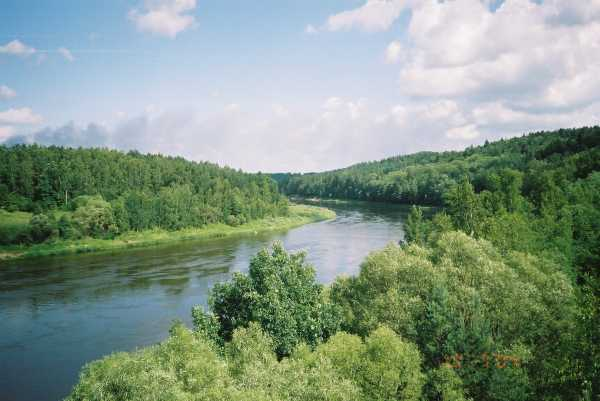
Neman near Alytus

English name	Countries	Other name(s) or older name(s)
Naab	(Germany)	Naab (German, French, Polish), Nába (Czech)
Namsen	(Norway)	Nååmesje (Southern Sami), Namsen (Norwegian, Swedish)
Narew	(Poland) (Belarus)	Narau - Нараў (Belarusian), Nare (former German), Narev (Czech), Narevas (Lithuanian), Narew (German, Polish)
Narva	(Estonia) (Russia)	Narv (Veps), Narva (Estonian, Latvian), Narva - Нарва (Russian, Belarusian), Narvajoki (Finnish), Narwa (Polish)
Neckar	(Germany)	Neccarus (Latin variant), Neckar (German), Nicer (Latin)
(Lusatian) Neisse	(Germany) (Poland) (Czech Republic)	Lausitzer Neiße (German), Lužická Nisa (Czech), Łužiska Nysa (Sorbian), Neisse (Dutch, French, Italian, Spanish), Nissa Lusatianus (Latin), Nysa Łużycka (Polish)
Eastern Neisse	(Poland)	Glatzer Neiße (German), Kladská Nisa (Czech), Nysa Kłodzka (Polish)
Raging Neisse	(Poland)	Nysa Szalona (Polish), Šílená Nisa (Czech), Wütende Neiße or Jauersche Neiße (German)
Neman	(Lithuania) (Russia) (Belarus)	Memel (German, Dutch), Mīmeli (Old Prussian), Neman - Неман (Russian), Němen (Czech), Nemons (Samogitian), Nemuna (Latvian), Nemunas (Lithuanian, Estonian, Norwegian), Niemen (Finnish, Polish, Spanish), Niémen (French), Njemen (Swedish), Nyoman - Нёман (Belarusian)
Nemunėlis	(Latvia) (Lithuania)	Memele - Мемеле (Russian), Mēmele (Latvian, Estonian), Nemunėlis (Lithuanian), Nemonielis (Samogitian), Niemenek (Polish)
Neretva	(Croatia) (Bosnia and Herzegovina)	Narenta (Italian), Naro (Latin), Narōn - Νάρων (ancient Greek), Neretva (Bosnian, Croatian, Czech, Slovene), Neretva - Неретва (Serbian), Neretwa (Polish)
Neris	(Lithuania) (Belarus)	Nere (Latvian), Neris (Lithuanian, Estonian, German), Néris (French), Viliya - Ві́лія (Belarusian), Viliya - Ви́лия (Russian), Wilia (Polish)
Nestos	(Greece) (Bulgaria)	Mesta - Места (Bulgarian, Macedonian, Russian), Mesta (French, Italian), Mesta Karasu (Ottoman Turkish), Nessus or Nestus (Latin), Nestos- Νέστος (Greek)
Neva	(Russia)	Neeva (Estonian), Neva (Croatian, Dutch, Finnish, Italian, Portuguese, Romanian, Serbian, Swedish, Veps), Neva - Нева (Russian), Něva (Czech), Néva (Hungarian), Nevan (Swedish variant), Newa (German, Polish), Nieva (Latin variant), Njewa (Upper Sorbian), Nyava - Нява (Belarusian)
Nitra	(Slovakia)	Neutra (German), Nitra (Czech, Slovak), Nyitra (Hungarian)
Nore	(Republic of Ireland)	Eoyrus (Latin), An Fheoir (Irish)
Noteć	(Poland)	Natissis (Latin), Netze (German), Notec or Niéc (Kashubian), Noteć (Polish, Czech)

== O ==
English name	Countries	Other name(s) or older name(s)
Oder	(Poland) (Germany) (Czech Republic)	Biadros - Βιαδρος (Ancient Greek), Oder (German, Danish, Dutch, French, Italian, Portuguese, Spanish, Swedish, Turkish), Òder (Catalan), Odera (Hungarian), Odera or Oddera (medieval Latin), Odra (Lower Sorbian, Polish, Bosnian, Croatian, Czech, Estonian, Lithuanian, Romanian, Slovak, Slovene), Òdra (Kashubian), Onter - Όντερ (modern Greek), Suebus (Latin), Syebos- Συήβος (ancient Greek), Uder (Silesian German), Uodra (Silesian), Viadrus (Renaissance Latin), Vjodr (Old Church Slavonic), Wódra (Upper Sorbian)
Odet	(France)	Oded (Breton, Manx, Welsh), Odera (Latin), Odet (French)
Oglio	(Italy)	Oglio (Italian), Òi (Lombard), Ollius (Latin)
Ohře/Eger	(Czech Republic) (Germany)	Agara / Agira (9th-century), Eger (German), Ohře, Ohara, and Oharka (Czech), Ohrza (Polish)
Oise	(France)	Esia (Neo-Latin), Isara (Latin), Oése (Picard), Oise (French)
Oka	(Russia)	Aka - Ака (Belarusian), Hura - Хура (Chuvash), Joka - Йока (Erzya), Occa or Aucensis (Latin), Oka - Ока (Russian, Mari, Mocksha)
Oker	(Germany)	Ovacra (Neo-Latin (AD 747)), Ocker (Early New High German)
Olt	(Romania)	Alt (German), Aluta (Latin, Polish), Alytos - Αλυτος (Greek), Olt (Hungarian, Romanian), Olt - Олт (Bulgarian), Oltu (Turkish)
Olza	(Poland) (Czech Republic)	Olsa (German), Olša (Slovak), Olše (Czech), Olza (Polish)
Onega	(Russia)	Äänisjoki (Finnish), Änine or Änižjogi (Veps), Onega - Оне́га (Russian)
Orava	(Slovakia)	Arva (Latin), Árva (Hungarian), Arwa (German), Orava (Czech, Slovak), Orawa (Polish)
Osam	(Bulgaria)	Assamus/Asamus (Latin), Osam - Осъм (Bulgarian), Ossam (German), Oszam (Hungarian),
Oskol	(Ukraine) (Russia)	Askol - Аскол (Belarusian), Oskil - Оскіл (Ukrainian), Oskol - Оскол (Russian)
Osobloga	(Czech Republic) (Poland)	Hotzenplotz (German, for Prussian/Polish part), Osoblaha (Czech), Osobłoga (Polish), Ossa (German, for Austrian/Czechoslovak part)
Oulujoki	(Finland)	Oulujoki (Finnish), Ule älv (Norwegian, Swedish)
Ounasjoki	(Finland)	Ounasjoki (Finnish), Ovnnesjohka (Northern Sami)
Ourthe	(Belgium)	Ourthe (French, Luxembourgish), Oûte (Walloon), Urt (German), Urta (Latin, 870 AD)
Ouse-Ure	(England)	Ear (English; 1025 AD, upper river), *Isura (Britonic, Latin), Jor, Yore (English; 12th-century, upper river), Ouse (lower river), Ure (upper river), Usa (Old English; 780 AD, lower river)
Oust	(France)	Austa, Hulda, Ousta or Ultum (Latin), Oud (Breton), Oust (French), Out (Gallo)

== P ==
English name	Countries	Other name(s) or older name(s)
Paatsjoki	(Norway) (Russia) (Finland)	Báhčaveaijohka (Northern Sami), Paaččjokk (Skolt Sami), Paatsjoki (Finnish), Pasvik älv (Swedish), Pasvikelva (Norwegian), Paz - Паз or Patsojoki - Патсойоки (Russian)
Pechora	(Russia)	Pechora - Печо́ра (Russian), Pechora -Печӧра (Komi), Petchora (French), Petschora (German), Sanjero Jaha - Санэроˮ яха (Nenets)
Peene	(Germany)	Peene (German), Pěna (Czech), Piana (Polish)
Piave	(Italy)	Piav (Lombard), Piava (Slovenian), Piave (Italian, Croatian, French, Hungarian, Venetian), Piawa (Polish), Plavá (Czech), Plavis (Latin), Ploden (German)
Pineios	(Greece)	Pénée (French), Peneiós - Πηνειός (ancient Greek), Penej - Пеней, (Bulgarian, Croatian), Peneo (Spanish), Peneu (Catalan), Peneus (Latin), Pinios (Dutch, alternative English, German), Piniós - Πηνειός (modern Greek), Salabrias or Salambrias (medieval Latin)
Pisuerga	(Spain)	Pisorga or Pisorica (Latin), Pisuerga (Spanish, Aragonese, Basque, Catalan, Galician, Portuguese)
Pite	(Sweden)	Bidumiedno or Bisumiedno (Pite Sami), Bihtámädno (Lule Sami), Piitimenjoki (Finnish), Pite älv or Piteälven (Swedish, Norwegian)
Piva	(Montenegro)	Simacus (Latin, Greek), Piva (Montenegrin, Serbian, Croatian, Bosnian)
Po	(Italy)	Bodincus or Bodencus (Ligurian), Eridano (old Italian), Eridanos - Ηριδανος (Ancient Greek), Pad (Polish, Slovene), Pád (Czech), Pàdos - Παδος (modern Greek), Padus or Eridanus (Latin), Pfad (German), Phó (Irish), Po (Catalan, Dutch, Italian, Maltese, Romanian, Spanish, Turkish, Venetian), Pò (Lombard, Piedmontese), Pó (Hungarian, Portuguese), Pô (Arpitan)
Pregolya	(Russia)	Pregel (German, Hungarian), Pregoła (Polish), Pregola (Czech, variant in English), Pregolja (Finnish), Pregolya - Преголя (Russian), Prieglius (Lithuanian), Vatrulia (Latin)
Prut	(Moldova) (Romania) (Ukraine)	Proet (Dutch), Prout (French), Prut (Czech, Hungarian, Polish, Romanian, Turkish), Prut - פּרוט (Yiddish), Pruth (German, English variant), Pyretòs - Πυρετος (Greek and Ancient Greek), Pyretus (Latin)
Prypiat	(Ukraine) (Belarus)	Pripeat (Romanian), Pripet (Finnish), Pripete (Latvian, Lithuanian), Pripetius (Latin), Pripiat (French, Spanish), Pripiať (Slovak), Pripjat (Dutch), Pripjať, Prypjať or Pripěť (Czech), Pripyat (English variant), Pripyat' - Припять (Russian), Pripjaty (Hungarian), Prõpjats (Estonian), Prypeć (Polish), Prypjat (German), Pryp'yat' - Прип'ять (Ukrainian), Prypyats' - Прыпяць (Belarusian)

== R ==
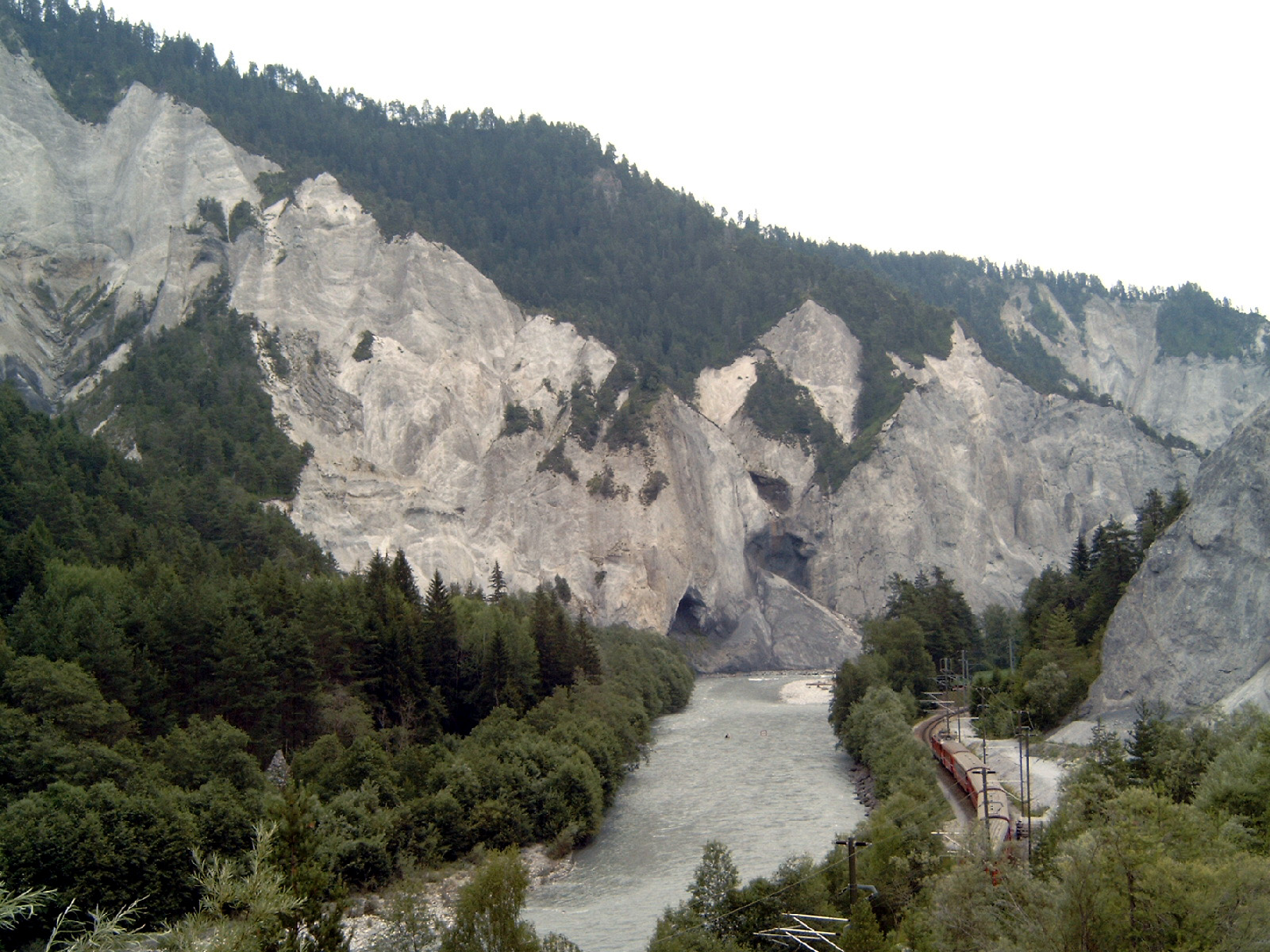
Anterior Rhine in a canyon called Ruinaulta, Surselva, Switzerland

English name	Countries	Other name(s) or older name(s)
Rába	(Hungary) (Austria)	Arabo or Raba (Latin), Arabos - Αραβος (Ancient Greek), Raab (German), Rába (Hungarian, Czech), Raba (Romanian, Slovene)
Rance	(France)	Rance (French), Rancz (Gallo), Renk (Breton, Welsh), Rinctius (Latin)
Råne	(Sweden)	Radnejokk (Northern Sami), Råneälven (Swedish, Norwegian), Rávnaädno (Lule Sami, Northern Sami), Raunajoki (Finnish)
Rhine	(Netherlands) (Germany) (France) (Switzerland) (Austria) (Liechtenstein)	Rain (Romansh), Rajna (Bosnian, Croatian, Hungarian, Serbian), Rayn - רײַן (Yiddish), Rein (Estonian, Finnish), an Réin (Irish), Reina (Latvian), Reinas (Lithuanian), Ren (Occitan, Polish, Slovene, Turkish), Reno (Italian, Portuguese), Renu (Corsican, Maltese), Reyn - Рейн (Bulgarian, Russian, Ukrainian), Reyn - Рэйн (Belarusian), Rhäin (Luxembourgish), Rhein (German, Bavarian, Welsh), Rhen (Swedish), Rhenos - Ρηνος (ancient Greek), Rhenus (Latin), Rhien (Low Saxon), Rhin (French, Basque), Rhinen (Danish, Norwegian), Rhing (Colognian), Rhoi (Palatine German), Rhy (Alemannic German), Rien (Limburgish, Low Saxon), Rijn (Dutch), Rin (Catalan, Romanian, Spanish, Walloon), Rín (Icelandic), Roen (Breton), Ryn (Afrikaans, Western Frisian), Rýn (Czech, Slovak)
Rhône	(France) (Switzerland)	Rhodanòs - Ροδανος (Greek and Ancient Greek), Rhodanus (Latin), Rhôna (Czech, Slovak), Rhône (French, Dutch, Estonian), Rhone (German, Hungarian), Rodan (Romansh, Polish), Rodano (Basque, Italian), Ródano (Portuguese, Spanish), Ròden (Lombard), *Rodonos (Gaulic), Róin (Irish), Roine (Catalan), Ron (Breton, Romanian), Rón (Icelandic), Rona - Рона (Bulgarian, Russian, Serbian), Rona (Croatian, Slovene), Róna (Czech), Rône (Western Frisian), Rôno (Arpitan), Ròno (Piedmontese), Ròse (Occitan), Rotten (Walliser German, former German), Rottu (Alemannisch), Roûno (Franco-Provençal)
Rienz	(Italy)	Byrrha (Latin), Rienz (German), Rienza (Italian)
Rioni	(Georgia (country))	Phasis - Φᾶσις (ancient and modern Greek), Rion (English variant), Rion - Ռիոն (Armenian), Rioni - რიონი (Georgian), Rioni - Риони (Russian)
Rubicon	(Italy)	Rubicão (Portuguese), Rubico or Rubicon (Latin), Rubicó (Catalan), Rubicon (Danish, Dutch, French, Hungarian, Norwegian, Romanian, Swedish), Rubicón (Spanish), Rubicone (Italian), Rubikon (Czech, Finnish, German, Polish, Slovene), Rubikon - Рубикон (Bulgarian, Russian)
Ruhr	(Germany)	Ruhr (German, Dutch, French, Low German), Ruhra (Polish), Rúr (Czech), Rura or Rurinna (Latin)
Rur	(Netherlands) (Germany) (Belgium)	Roer (Dutch, French, Italian, Limburgish), Roër (Italian variant), Roûle (Walloon), Rur (German, Colognian, Romanian, Spanish)

== S ==
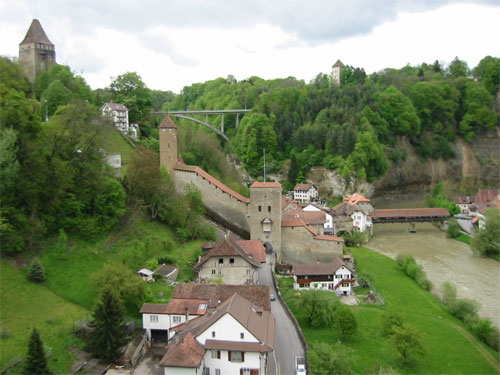
Saane/Sarine at Fribourg

English name	Countries	Other name(s) or older name(s)
Saale	(Germany)	Saale (German), Sala (Latin), Sála (Czech, Slovak), Solawa (Sorbian), Soława (Polish)
Saane/Sarine	(Switzerland)	Charnà (Fribourg patois), Saane (German), Sanona (Latin), Sarina (Italian), Sarine (French)
Saar	(Germany) (France)	Saar (Danish, German, Hungarian, Italian, Romanian), Saar - Саар (Russian), Saara (Polish), Saravus (Latin), Sarre (French, Portuguese, Spanish), an tSáir (Irish)
Sado	(Portugal)	Calipus (Latin), Sádão (archaic Portuguese), Sado (Portuguese)
Sajó	(Hungary) (Slovakia)	Sajo (Romanian), Sajó (Hungarian), Šajo (Croatian), Salz, Salza or Salzbach, (German), Slaná (Slovak, Czech)
Sakmara	(Russia)	Haqmar - Һаҡмар (Bashkir), Sakmar - Сакмар (Tatar), Sakmara - Сакмара (Russian)
Salzach	(Austria) (Germany)	Isonta (Latin, upper part), Iuvarus / Ivarus (Latin), Salzach (German), Salzaha (Neo-Latin), Soizach (Austro-Bavarian)
Samara	(Russia)	Samar - Самар (Chuvash, Tatar), Samara - Самара (Russian)
Sambre	(Belgium) (France)	Sabes - Σαβης (Ancient Greek), Sabis (Latin), Sambe (Walloon), Samber (Dutch), Sambra (Polish), Sambre (French, German, Luxembourgish)
Samur	(Russia) (Azerbaijan)	Kʼulan - Кьулан or Chhvegʼan - ЧӀвегьер (Lezgian), Samur - Самур (Russian), Samurçay (Azerbaijani, Turkish), Samyr - Самыр (Rutul)
San	(Poland) (Ukraine)	Saan (German), San (Polish, Slovak), Sian - Сян (Ukrainian)
Sangro	(Italy)	Isagros - Ισαγρος or Sagros - Σαγρος (Ancient Greek), Sagrus (Latin), Sangro (Latin)
Saône	(France)	Arar (pre-Roman), Brigoulus, Sagonna or Souconna (Latin), Saona (Catalan, Czech, Italian, Polish, Portuguese, Spanish), Saône (Estonian, Dutch, French, German, Hungarian), Sona (Arpitan), Sòna (Occitan)
Sauer	(Germany) (Luxembourg) (Belgium)	Sauer (German, Luxembourgish), Seure (Walloon), Sura (Latin), Sûre (French)
Sava	(Serbia) (Bosnia and Herzegovina) (Croatia) (Slovenia)	Sabos - Σαβος (Ancient Greek), Sau (German), Sava (Bosnian, Croatian, Italian, Romanian, Slovene, Turkish), Sava - Сава (Serbian, Russian, Ukrainian), Sáva (Czech, Slovak), Save (French, German, variant in English), Savus (Latin), Sawa (Polish), Sawe (German variant), Száva (Hungarian)
Schaale	(Germany)	Chalousos (Ancient Greek)
Scheldt	(Netherlands) (Belgium) (France)	Escalda (Spanish), Escaut (French, Picard), Escô (Walloon), Scaldis (Latin), Schelda (Italian), Schelde (Dutch, German, Hungarian, Swedish, West Flemish, Zeelandic), Šelda (Czech), Sjelde (Limburgish), Skalda (Polish), Skelde (West Frisian)
Segre	(Spain) (France)	Segre (Catalan, Occitan, Spanish), Sègre (French), Sicoris (Latin), Nahr az-Zaytūn نهر الزيتون (Arabic)
Segura	(Spain)	Segura (Spanish), Tader or Thader (Latin), Wadi al-Abyad or War-Alabiat - وادي الأبيض or شقورة, (Arabic)
Seine	(France)	Saena (Breton), Seina (Czech), Sèina (Occitan), Seine (Dutch, French, German, Swedish variant, Welsh), Seinen (Danish, Swedish), Sekwana (Polish), Sen (Turkish), Sena (Catalan, Croatian, Galician, Portuguese, Romanian, Spanish, Slovene), Sena - Сена (Serbian, Russian, Ukrainian), Senna (Italian), Sequana or Sequanna (Celtic), Sequana or Sequanus (Latin), Sigen (Old English), Signa (Icelandic), Sikouànas - Σηκουάνας (Greek), Sinne (Walloon), Szajna (Hungarian), an tSéin (Irish)
Sele	(France)	Sele (Italian), Sélé (French), Silarus, Siler, Silerus or Sylar (Latin)
Semois	(France) (Belgium)	Semois (French [Belgium]), Semoy (French [France]), Sesbach (German), Sesomires or Sesmara (Latin), Setzbaach (Arlon Luxembourgish), Simwès or Smwès (Walloon)
Sense	(Switzerland)	Chindzena (Fribourg patois), Sense (German), Singine (French)
Sesia	(Italy)	Sesia (Italian, Piedmontese), Sesites, Sessites or Sicia (Latin), Tseschra (Walser German)
Šešupė	(Lithuania) (Russia) (Poland)	Ostfluss (briefly former German), Scheschup(p)e (German), Šešopė (Samogitian), Šešupė (Lithuanian), Sheshupe - Шешупе (Russian), Szeszupa (Polish)
Severn	(England) (Wales)	(Afon) Hafren (Welsh), Sabhrainn (Irish), Sabrina (Latin), Sæfern (Old English)
Seym	(Ukraine) (Russia)	Seim, Sejm or Seym - Сейм (Russian, Ukrainian), Sejm (Czech, Polish)
Shannon	(Republic of Ireland)	Abhainn na Sionainne (variant in Irish), y Çhannon (Manx), Scene (Old English), Senus (Latin), Shanon - Շանոն (Armenian), Shanon - Шанон (Macedonian), Shannon - Шаннон (Russian), Shanǎn - Шанън (Bulgarian), an tSionainn (Irish), an tSionna (variant in Irish)
Shkumbin	(Albania)	Genessus or Genusus (Latin), Genoúsos - Γενούσος (Ancient Greek), Shkumbin or Shkëmbi (Albanian), Shkumba - Шкумба or Shkumbin - Шкумбин (Macedonian, Serbian), Skoumpin - Σκούμπιν (Modern Greek)
Sieg	(Germany)	Segaha (Latin), Sie (Colognian dialect), Sieg (German)
Siret	(Romania) (Ukraine)	Ararus or Hierasus (Latin), Hierasòs - Ιερασος (Ancient Greek), Seret (Polish), Seret / Siret - Серет / Сірет (Ukrainian), Sereth (German), Siret (Romanian), Siret - Сирет (Russian), Sireth (traditional English), Szeret (Hungarian)
Skellefte	(Sweden)	Skellefteälven (Swedish, Norwegian), Syöldateiednuo (Ume Sami)
Soča	(Italy) (Slovenia)	Aesontius / Sontius (Latin), Aipsōntios - Αιψωντιος (Ancient Greek), Isonz (Lombard), Isonzo (Italian, French, German, Spanish), Isonzó (Hungarian), Lisonz (Venetian), Lusinç or Lisunç (Friulian), Soča (Slovene, Croatian, Czech), Sontig (historic German)
Someş	(Hungary) (Romania)	Samosch (German), Samosius / Samus (Latin), Samosz (Polish), Someş (Romanian), Somesch (German), Somesh - Сомеш (Ukrainian), Szamos (Hungarian)
Someşul Mare	(Romania)	Großer Somesch (German), Nagy-Szamos (Hungarian), Someşul Mare (Romanian)
Someşul Mic	(Romania)	Kis-Szamos (Hungarian), Kleiner Somesch (German), Someşul Mic (Romanian)
Somme	(France)	Samara (Gaulish, Latin), Somena/Somona (Latin variants), Somma (Polish), Somme (French, German, Hungarian, Romanian, Swedish), Sonme (Picard), Zomme (Middle Dutch), Zoom (West Flemish)
Sozh	(Ukraine) (Belarus) (Russia)	Soj (French), Sosch (German), Soż (Polish), Sožas (Lithuanian), Sozh - Сож (Belarusian, Russian, Ukrainian)
Spey	(Scotland)	Spè (Scottish Gaelic), Uisge Spé (Irish), Spea (Latin)
Spree	(Germany) (Czech Republic)	Spree (German, Swedish), Spréva (Czech), Spreva (Latin), Sprewa / Szprewa (Polish), Sprjewja (Lower Sorbian), Sprowja / Sprewja / Šprewa (Sorbian)
Struma	(Greece) (Bulgaria)	Estrimón (Spanish), Karasu (Turkish), Strimónas - Στρυμώνας (Greek), Strouma (French, variant in English), Struma - Струма (Bulgarian, Serbian), Struma (Czech), Strymon (ancient Greek, Latin, variant in English), Sztruma (Hungarian)
Suir	(Republic of Ireland)	Siúr or Abhainn na Siúire (Irish), Suirus (Latin)
Sukhona	(Russia)	Soukhona (French), Suchona (Latin, German, Italian), Suhona (Finnish), Sújona (Spanish), Sukhona - Су́хона (Russian)
Sulak	(Russia)	Ġoy-su - ГIой-хи (Chechen), Kʼas - Кьас (Dargin), Qoj su - Къой су (Kumyk), Sulak - Сулак (Lezgian, Russian), Sulak (Azerbaijani), Sulapi - სულაკი (Georgian), Sulaq - Сула́хъ (Avaric)
Sunzha	(Russia)	Sholʒə - Шолжа (Ingush), Sölƶa - Соьлжа (Chechen), Sunja - სუნჯა (Georgian), Sunžæ - Сунжæ (Ossetian), Sunzha - Су́нжа (Russian), Səndž - Сындж (Kabardian)
Sura	(Russia)	Săr - Сӑр (Chuvash), Sırı - Сыры (Tatar), Soera (Dutch), Soura (French), Šur - Шур (Mari), Sura - Сура́ (Moksha, Russian), Sura Lej - Сура лей (Erzya)
Svir	(Russia)	Süvär (Veps), Svir - Свирь (Russian), Syväri (Finnish, Karelian)
Świna	(Poland)	Svina (Czech), Swina (Pomeranian), Świna (Polish), Swine (German)

== T ==
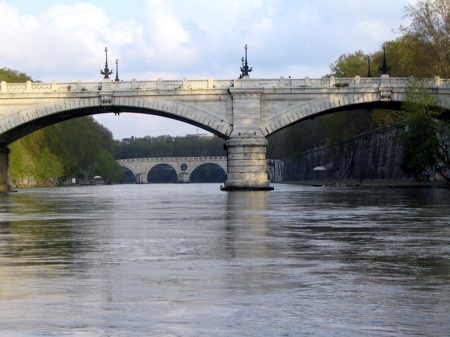
Tiber in Rome

English name	Countries	Other name(s) or older name(s)
Taff	(Wales)	Taf (Welsh, Breton)
Tagliamento	(Italy)	Dülmende (medieval German), Tagliamento (Italian), Tajamento (Venetian), Tiliaventum (Latin), Tiliment or Taiament (Friulian), Tilment (Croatian)
Tagus	(Portugal) (Spain)	Taach (Frisian), Taag (Dutch), Tachas (Lithuanian), Tacho (Aragonese), Tag (Polish), Tage (Old Catalan, French, Occitan), Tago (Italian), Tagos - Ταγος (Ancient Greek), Tagus (Latin), Taho - Тахо (Russian), Tajo (Spanish, Basque, Catalan, German), Teijo (Mirandese), Tejo (Portuguese), Teju (Extremaduran), Texo (Galician),
Tana	(Norway) (Finland)	Deatnu (Northern Sami), Tana or Tanaelva (Norwegian), Tana älv (Swedish), Tana - Тана (Russian), Teno or Tenojoki (Finnish)
Tara	(Montenegro)	Autarius, Tarus (Greek, Latin), Tara (Montenegrin, Serbian, Croatian, Bosnian)
Tarn	(France)	Tarn (French, Occitan), Tarnis (Latin)
Tay	(Scotland)	Tatha (Scottish Gaelic, Breton, Irish), Tava or Taus (Latin), Tay (Scots, Welsh)
Terek	(Russia) (Georgia (country))	Tergi - თერგი (Georgian), Terek - Терек (Avar, Azerbaijani, Lezgian, Russian), Terk - Терк (Karachay-Balkar, Ossetian), Terka - Теркa (Chechen)
Thames	(England)	Riviéthe dé Londres (Norman), Tafwys (Welsh), Tamais (Irish), Tamesa (Latin variant), Tàmesi (Catalan), Tamesis (Latin), Tàmesis - Ταμεσης (Greek), Támesis (Spanish), Tamigi (Italian), Tamisa (Portuguese, Romanian), Tamise (French), Tamiza (Polish), Tavoez (Breton), Teems (Afrikaans, Western Frisian), Temes (Old English), Temese (middle English), Temza (Croatian, Latvian, Slovene), Temza - Темза (Bulgarian, Serbian, Russian), Temze (Hungarian), Temže (Czech), Thaimish (Manx), Theems (Dutch), Thems (Low German, West Flemish), Themse (German), Themsen (Danish, Norwegian, Swedish)
Thaya	(Austria) (Czech Republic)	Dyja (Polish), Dyje (Czech, Slovak), Thaya (German, French, Hungarian, Italian)
Thielle	(Switzerland)	Thièle or Thielle (French), Zihl (German)
Thyamis	(Greece)	Glykys - Γλυκύς (alternative Greek name), Kalamai (Albanian), Kalamas - Καλαμάς (alternative Greek, German), Thiamis (French), Thyamis - Θύαμις (Greek), Tíamis (Spanish), Tijamis (Serbian)
Tiber	(Italy)	Albula and Rumon (former Latin names), Téivie (Ligurian), Tever (Lombard), Tevere (Italian, Corsican, Hungarian, Maltese), Tèviri (Sicilian), Tibar (Friulian, Serbian), Tiber (Latin, Afrikaans, Dutch, German, Spanish, Turkish), Tíber (Catalan), Tibera (Czech, Slovene), Tiberen (Danish), Tiberis - Τιβερης (Greek), Tibern (Swedish), Tibir (Irish), Tibr - Тибр (Russian), Tibr - Тібр (Ukrainian), Tibra (Latvian), Tibre (French, Portuguese), Tibru (Romanian), Tyber (Polish), Tyberis (Latin variant)
Ticino	(Italy) (Switzerland)	Tesin (Piedmontese, alternative Lombard), Tesino (Spanish), Tessin (Alemannish, French, German), Ticino (Italian, Romansh), Ticinus (Latin), Tisin (Lombard, Venetian), Tzich or Tisen (Ticino dialect of Lombard)
Timiș	(Serbia) (Romania)	Tamiš - Тамиш (Serbian), Temes (Hungarian), Temeš (Czech), Temesch (German), Temesz (Polish), Teyss (archaic English) Thibisis / Thympiscos - Θίβισις / Θυμπισκος (Ancient Greek), Tibiscus / Tibisis (Latin), Timiș (Romanian),
Tisza	(Serbia) (Hungary) (Slovakia) (Ukraine) (Romania)	Cisa (Polish), Pathissos - Πάθισσος (ancient Greek), Theiß (German), Theiss (older English texts), Tibisco (Italian), Tibisque (older French texts), Tisa (Croatian, Czech, Romanian, Slovak, Slovene, Turkish), Tisa - Тиса (Serbian, Russian), Tisia, Tissus or Pathissus (Latin), Tisza (Hungarian, Dutch, French, Portuguese, Spanish, Swedish), Tysa - Тиса (Ukrainian)
Torne	(Sweden) (Finland)	Duortneseatnu (Northern Sami), Torne älv (Swedish), Tornionjoki (Finnish), Tornionväylä (Meänkieli)
Trent	(England)	Trisantona (Latin), Terentus or Trehenta (Neolatin)
Trieux	(France)	Titus or Tetus (Latin), Trev or Treñv (Breton, Gallo), Trieux (French)
Tuloma	(Russia) (Finland)	Doallánjohka (Northern Sami), Tuållâmjokk (Skolt Sami), Tuloma (Norwegian), Tuloma - Тулома (Russian), Tuulomajoki (Finnish)
Tundzha	(Turkey) (Bulgaria)	Taenarus / Tonzus (Latin), Tonzos - Τόνζος (Greek), Toundja (French), Tunca (Turkish), Tundja (Romanian), Tundscha (German), Tundzha / Tundža - Тунджа (Bulgarian)
Tweed	(England) (Scotland)	Thuaid (Irish), Tuaidh (Scottish Gaelic), Tueda (Latin), Tweed (Welsh), Tweid (Scots)

== U ==
English name	Countries	Other name(s) or older name(s)
Ufa	(Russia)	Ӗphü - Ӗпхӳ (Chuvash), Oefa (Dutch), Oufa (French), Karaidel - Караидел (Tatar), Karaizel (Turkish), Qaridhel - Ҡариҙел (Bashkir), Šem Viče - Шем Виче (Mari), Ufa (German, Italian, Spanish), Ufa - Уфа (Russian)
Ume	(Sweden)	Ubmejeiednuo (Ume Sami), Ume älv or Umeälven (Swedish, Norwegian), Uumajanjoki (Finnish)
Ural	(Russia)	Âjyǩ - Яйыҡ (Bashkir), Daïkos - Δάϊκος (Ancient Greek), Ğaek - Җаек (Tatar), Jayıq - Жайық (Kazakh), Jayıq (Kara-Kalpak), Oeral (Dutch), Oural (French), Ouralis - Ουράλης (modern Greek), Rhymnus or Iaick (Latin), an Úrail (Irish), Ural (Czech, German, Italian, Spanish), Ural - Урал (Russian), Wral (Welsh), Yaik - Яик (former Russian),
Usa	(Russia)	Oussa (French), Usa - Уса́ (Russian), Ussa (German), Usva - Усва (Komi)
Usk	(Wales)	Isca (Latin), Wysg (Welsh, Breton)
Uzh	(Slovakia) (Ukraine)	Uh (Slovak), Uh - Уг (Ruthenian), Ung (Hungarian), Uzh - Уж (Russian, Ukrainian), Uż (Polish)

== V ==
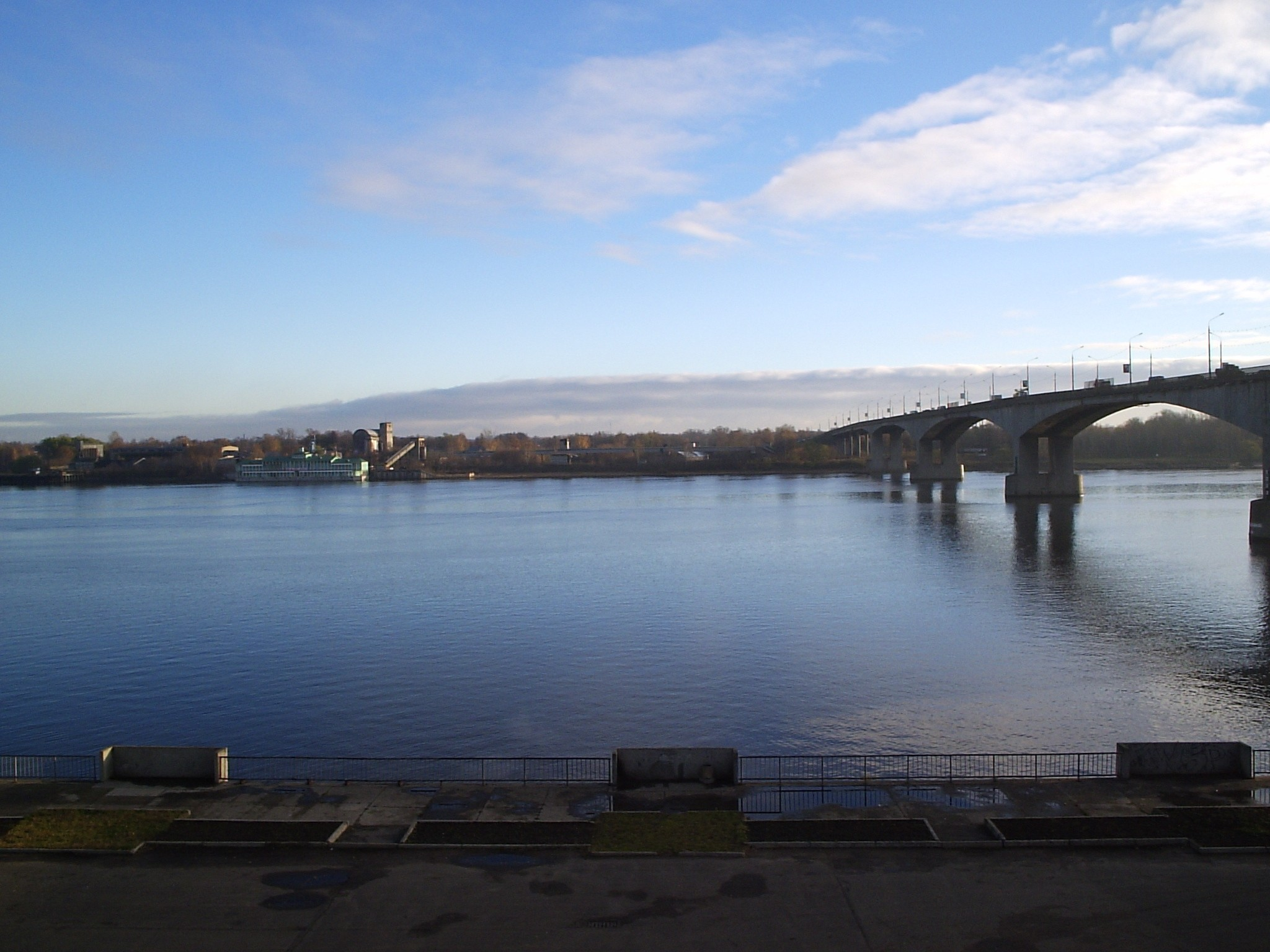
Volga at Yaroslavl

English name	Countries	Other name(s) or older name(s)
Váh	(Slovakia)	Cusus (Latin variant), Vág (Hungarian), Vaghus (Latin), Vah - Ваг (Ukrainian), Váh (Slovak, Czech, Romanian), Waag (German), Wag (Polish)
Vardar	(Greece) (North Macedonia)	Axiós - Αξιος (Greek), Axius (Latin), Vardar (Bulgarian, Croatian, Czech, Hungarian, Italian, Serbian, Slovene, Macedonian, Romanian, Turkish), Vardar or Wardar (German), Vardari (Albanian), Wardar (Polish)
Vechte	(Netherlands) (Germany)	(Oeriselske) Fecht (Western Frisian), (Overijsselse) Vecht (Dutch), Vechte (German, Low Saxon)
Vefsna	(Norway)	Vaapstenjeanoe (Southern Sami), Vapstälven (Swedish), Vefsna (Norwegian),
Venta	(Latvia) (Lithuania)	Vǟnta (Livonian), Venta (Latvian, Lithuanian), Venta - Вента (Russian), Vėnta (Samogitian), Windau (German), Windawa (Polish)
Vetluga	(Russia)	Vetlouga (French), Vetluga - Ветлу́га (Russian), Vütla - Вӱтла (Eastern Mari), Və̈tlä - Вӹтлӓ (Western Mari), Wetluga (German), Wietługa (Polish)
Vienne	(France)	Viena (Catalan), Vienne (French), Vigenna or Vingenna (Latin), Vinhana or Viena (Occitan)
Vilaine	(France)	Gwilen or Gwilun (Breton, Welsh), Vicinonia, Vicenonia or Visnonia (Latin), Vilaèyn (Gallo), Vilaine (French)
Vindel	(Sweden)	Vidduolienuo (Ume Sami), Vindelälven (Swedish, Norwegian),
Vistula	(Poland)	Vaysl - װײַסל (Yiddish), Veiksel (Finnish), an Viostúile (Irish), Visla (Czech, Latvian, Slovak, Slovene), Visla - Вісла (Belarusian, Ukrainian), Visla - Висла (Bulgarian, Russian, Serbian), Vistola (Italian), Vistül (Turkish), Vistula (Latin, Romanian, Swedish variant), Vístula (Catalan, Portuguese, Spanish), Vistule (French), Visztula (Hungarian), Vysla (Lithuanian), Weichsel (German, Swedish variant), Wießel (Low German), Wijsel or Wijssel (Dutch), Wisła (Polish, Swedish variant), Wisła or Visla (Estonian)
Vltava	(Czech Republic)	Fuldaha (medieval Latin (872 AD)), Moldau (Dutch, German, Swedish), Moldva (Hungarian), Moldava (Italian, Spanish), Moldawa (Silesian), Multavia, Moldava or Multa (Latin), Vltava (Czech, Finnish, French, Romanian, Slovak, Slovene, Swedish), Vltava - Влтава (Serbian, Russian, Ukrainian), Wełtawa (Polish), Wlitaua (Old Czech), Wołtawa (Sorbian), Wultha (medieval Latin (1125 AD))
Volga	(Russia)	Atăl - Атӑл (Chuvash), Edil (Kazakh), İdel - Идел (Tatar), Idhel (Bashkir), İdil (Turkish), Indɨl (Adyghe), Ijil mörön (Oirat), İtil (Karachay-Balkar), Izhil - Ижил (Mongolian), Jezhel Muren - Эжэл мүрэн (Buryat), Jul - Юл (Mari), Rā (Scythian), Rav - Рав (Erzya, Mordvin), Rava - Рава (Mocksha), Rha (Latin), Vl'ga (Church Slavic), Volg (Veps), Volga (Croatian, Finnish, French, Hungarian, Irish, Italian, Maltese, Portuguese, Romanian, Spanish, Slovene, Swedish, Turkish), Volga - Волга (Russian, Serbian, Ukrainian), Volgan (Swedish variant), Vòlgas - Βολγας (Greek), Volha (Czech), Vollga (Albanian), Wolga (Afrikaans, Dutch, Frisian, German, Turkmen), Wołga (Polish, Silesian)
Volkhov	(Russia)	Olhav (Veps), Olhava (Ingrian), Olhavanjoki (Finnish), Volhova (Latvian), Volhovi jõgi (Estonian), Vóljov (Spanish), Volkhov - Во́лхов (Russian), Wolchow (German), Wołchow (Polish)
Vuoksi	(Russia) (Finland)	Vuoksa (Norwegian), Vuoksa - Вуокса (Russian), Vuoksen (Swedish), Vuoksi (Finnish, French, German)
Vyatka	(Russia)	Noqrat - Нократ (Tatar), Nuhrat Atăl - Нухрат Атӑл (Chuvash), Vatka - Ватка (Mari, Udmurt), Viatca (Latin), Viatka (French, Spanish), Viče - Виче (Mari), Vjatka (Dutch, Italian), Vyatka - Вя́тка (Russian), Wiatka (Polish), Wjatka (German)
Vychegda	(Russia)	Ežva - Эжва (Komi), Vychegda - Вычегда (Russian), Vytchegda (French), Wytschegda (German)

== W ==
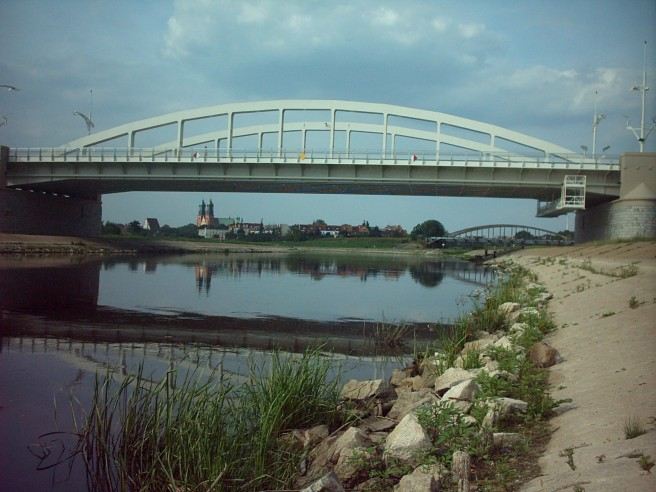
Warta at Poznań

English name	Countries	Other name(s) or older name(s)
Waal	(Netherlands)	Vacalis / Vahalis / Valis (Latin), Valas (Lithuanian), Waal (Dutch, German, Low Saxon, West Frisian), Wahal or Vahal (alternative French), Wål (Walloon), Woal (West Flemish)
Warnow	(Germany)	Chalousos - Χαλοῦσος (Ancient Greek)?, Chalusus (Latin)?, Varnava (Czech), Warnow (German, Polish)
Warta	(Poland)	Varta (Czech, Latin), Warta (Polish), Warthe (German, Swedish)
Werra	(Germany)	Weraha (Neo-Latin), Werra (German)
Weser	(Germany)	Vesdre (French), Vezera (Czech), Vēzere (Latvian), Vėzeris (Lithuanian), Visurgis (Latin), Weeser (Northern Frisian), Werser (Low German), Weser (German, Danish, Western Frisian), Wezer (Dutch), Wezera (Polish)
Wieprz	(Poland)	Vepr - Вепр (Ukrainian, Taraškievica Belarusian), Vepsh (Belarusian, Russian), Vepšas (Lithuanian), Wieprz (Polish)
Wisłok	(Poland)	Vislok - Віслок (Ukrainian), Vyslokas (Lithuanian), Weisslok or Weisslog (German), Wisłok (Polish)
Wkra	(Poland)	Vkra (Lithuanian), Wkra (Polish)
Wupper	(Germany)	Wipper (upper part of river), Wippera (Latin), Wupper (German)
Wye	(Wales) (England)	Gwy (Welsh, Breton), Vaga / Waia (Latin)

== Y ==
English name	Countries	Other name(s) or older name(s)
Yantra	(Bulgaria)	Etar (older Bulgarian), Iantra (Romanian), Iatus (Latin), Jantra (German), Yantra - Я̀нтра (Bulgarian), Oszam (Hungarian),
Ybbs	(Austria)	Íbosa (Portuguese), Jivice (Croatian), Ois, Weiße Ois (upper regions), Ybbs (Austro-Bavarian, German)
Yonne	(France)	Icaunus (Latin), Yonne (French)
Yser	(Belgium) (France)	IJzer (Dutch), Isera (Latin), Izer (Walloon), Yser (French), Yzer (West Flemish)
Yug	(Russia)	Ioug (French), Jug (German, Italian), Yug - Юг (Komi, Russian)

== Z ==
English name	Countries	Other name(s) or older name(s)
Zeta	(Montenegro)	Zenta (Greek), Senta (Latin) Zeta (Montenegrin, Serbian, Croatian, Bosnian, Albanian)
Zbruch	(Ukraine)	Sbrutch (German), Zbroutch (French), Zbruč (Czech, Italian), Zbruch - Збруч (Ukrainian), Zbrucz (Polish)
Zenne	(Belgium)	Sainna (Latin), Senne (French, German), Sena (Lithuanian), Zenne (Dutch)
Zêzere	(Portugal)	Zêzere (Portugues), Zézere (Galician, Mirandese)
Zrmanja	(Croatia)	Tedanius (Latin), Zermagna (Italian), Zrmanja (Bosnian, Croatian, Serbian)
Zwarte Water	(Netherlands)	Swarte Wetter (Western Frisian), Zwarte Water (Dutch), Zwärte Wäter (Low Saxon)

== See also ==
- Endonym and exonym
- List of rivers of Europe
- Latin names of European rivers
- List of alternative country names
- List of country names in various languages
- List of European regions with alternative names
- List of European cities with alternative names
- List of Latin place names in Europe
- List of places
