= Ufente =

Physical characteristics
- Mouth
  - coordinates: 41.288127°N 13.195863°E

The Ufente is a river in the province of Latium, in the historic area of the Pontine Marshes. It was known as Aufentus in Latin. It flows in a channel to the Tyrrhenian Sea at Tarracina, joining a parallel channel, the Fiume Portatore, less than one kilometer from the sea.

Fishing is permitted along at least parts of the river.

According to Strabo:

In front of Tarracina lies a great marsh, formed by two rivers; the larger one is called the Aufidus (Ufente). It is here that the Appian Way first touches the sea ... Near Tarracina, as you go toward Rome, there is a canal that runs alongside the Appian Way, and is fed at numerous places by waters from the marshes and the rivers ... The boat is towed by a mule.
