= Fiora (river) =

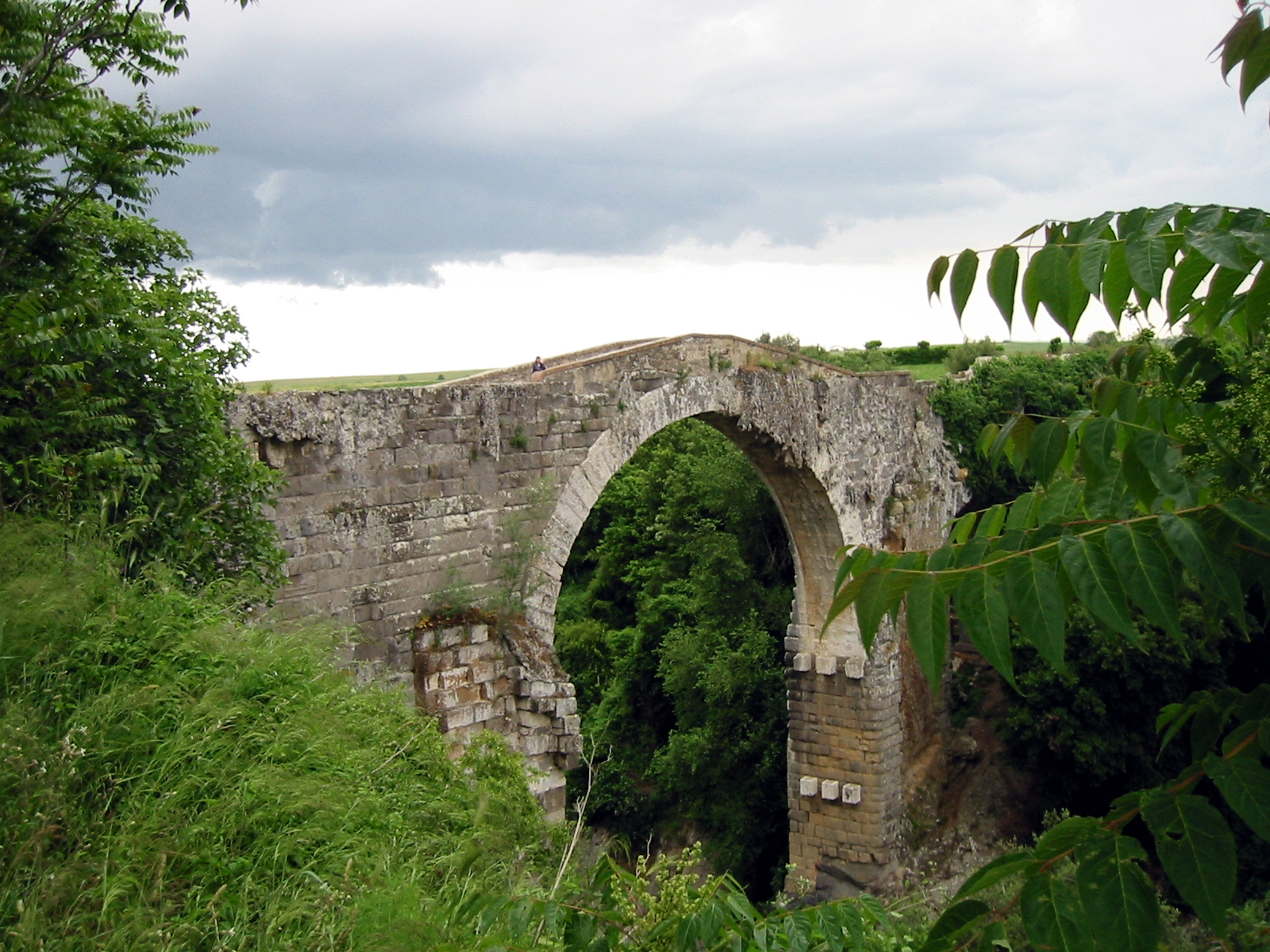
- The Ponte di Badia at Vulci

Location
- Country: Italy

Physical characteristics
- Source
  - location: Monte Amiata
  - elevation: 1,200 m (3,900 ft)
- Mouth: Tyrrhenian Sea
  - coordinates: 42.3283°N 11.5739°E
- Length: 83 km (52 mi)
- Basin size: 1,600 km^{2} (620 sq mi)

The Fiora is a river in northern Lazio and southern Tuscany, central Italy, which springs from the southern flank of the Monte Amiata, near Santa Fiora. After crossing the Lazio Maremma, it flows in the north-western part of the province of Viterbo before getting into the Tyrrhenian Sea near Montalto di Castro. One of the remarkable settlements on the Fiora River during the Bronze Age period is Crostoletto di Lamone, a plateau.
