= List of largest lakes of Europe =

This is a list of lakes of Europe with an average area greater than 100 km^{2} (39 sq mi). Some smaller lakes may be missing from the list.

== List ==
Reservoirs and smaller sub-basins that are already counted are not ranked.

List of lakes, showing country and size, with European ranking
Rank	Name	Native names	Country	Average area		Notes
Rank	Name	Native names	Country	km^{2}	mi^{2}	Notes
1	Ladoga	Ла́дожское о́зеро, Laatokka	Russia	17,700	6,800	14th largest lake in the world
2	Onega	Onego, Онежское озеро, Ääninen, Äänisjärvi	Russia	9,894	3,820	18th largest lake in the world
	Kuybyshev	Ку́йбышевское водохрани́лище (Kuybyshevskoye Reservoir)	Russia	6,450	2,490	3rd largest reservoir in the world
3	Vänern		Sweden	5,655	2,183	Largest lake in Sweden and the European Union.
	Rybinsk	Ры́бинское водохрани́лище (Rybinskoye Reservoir)	Russia	4,580	1,770	
4	Saimaa		Finland	4,377	1,690	Largest lake in Finland; a group of smaller lake basins
5	Peipus	Peipsi-Pihkva järv, Чудско-Псковское озеро, Peipusa ezers	Estonia / Russia	3,555	1,373	Largest lake in Estonia
	Tsimlyansk	Цимля́нское водохрани́лище (Tsimlyanskoye Reservoir)	Russia	2,702	1,043	
	Kremenchuk	Кременчуцьке водосховище	Ukraine	2,250	870	
	Kakhovka	Каховське водосховище	Ukraine	2,155	832	
6	Vättern		Sweden	1,893	731	Includes permanently settled offshore island of Visingsö
	Saratov	Саратовское водохрани́лище	Russia	1,831	707	
	Gorky	Горьковское водохрани́лище	Russia	1,591	614	
	Suur-Saimaa		Finland	1,377	532	Largest basin of Saimaa
7	Beloye	Белое озеро	Russia	1,290	500	
8	Vygozero	Выгозеро, Uikujärvi	Russia	1,250	480	Original area 766 km^{2} before the construction of a dam
9	Mälaren		Sweden	1,140	440	
10	IJsselmeer		Netherlands	1,100	420	Closed off sea inlet. Largest lake in the Netherlands
	Nizhnekamsk	Нижнека́мское водохрани́лище	Russia	1,084	419	
11	Päijänne		Finland	1,081	417	Deepest lake in Finland
12	Inari	Inarijärvi, Enare träsk, Anárjávri, Aanaarjävri, Aanarjäuˊrr	Finland	1,040	400	Largest lake in Lapland; Finland's northernmost large lake
13	Kyiv	Київське водосховище	Ukraine	992	383	
14	Topozero	Топозеро, Tuoppajärvi	Russia	986	381	
15	Ilmen	Ильмень	Russia	982	379	(733–2,090 km^{2} (283–807 sq mi))
16	Segozero	Сегозеро, Seesjärvi	Russia	906	350	
17	Pielinen		Finland	894	345	
18	Oulujärvi	Ule träsk	Finland	887	342	
19	Imandra	Имандра, Imantero, Âʹvverjäuʹrr	Russia	876	338	
	Pihlajavesi		Finland	713	275	Part of Saimaa
	Pihkva		Estonia / Russia	710	270	Part of Peipus
20	Markermeer		Netherlands	700	270	Previously (before 1975) part of the IJsselmeer
	Kaniv	Канівське водосховище	Ukraine	675	261	
21	Pyaozero	Пяозеро, Pääjärvi	Russia	659	254	
22	Kovdozero	Ковдозеро, Koutajärvi	Russia	608	235	
	Mingachevir		Azerbaijan	605	234	
	Orivesi		Finland	601	232	Part of Saimaa
23	Balaton		Hungary	592	229	Largest lake in Central Europe
24	Geneva	Lac Léman, Lago Lemano, Genfersee, Lai da Genevra	France / Switzerland	581	224	Largest lake in Switzerland and France, largest lake in the Alps
	Kamianske	Кам'янське водосховище	Ukraine	567	219	
	Haukivesi		Finland	562	217	Part of Saimaa
25	Constance	Bodensee	Germany / Switzerland / Austria	541	209	Largest lake in Germany and Austria
26	Keitele		Finland	494	191	
27	Hjälmaren		Sweden	485	187	
28	Kallavesi		Finland	473	183	
29	Skadar	Liqeni i Shkodrës, Skadarsko jezero	Albania / Montenegro	472	182	Largest lake in Southern Europe
30	Storsjön		Sweden	464	179	
	Puruvesi		Finland	421	163	Part of Saimaa
31	Vozhe		Russia	416	161	
32	Razim		Romania	415	160	Largest lake in Romania
33	Kubenskoye	Кубенское озеро	Russia	407	157	
34	Lough Neagh	Loch nEathach, Loch Neagh	Northern Ireland	383	148	Largest lake in United Kingdom, largest lake on the island of Ireland (by surface area)
35	Sheksninskoye		Russia	380	150	
36	Garda	Lago di Garda	Italy	370	140	Largest lake in Italy
37	Mjøsa		Norway	365	141	Largest lake in Norway
	Pyhäselkä		Finland	361	139	Part of Saimaa
38	Ohrid	Охридско Езеро (Ohridsko Ezero), Liqeni i Ohrit	North Macedonia / Albania	358	138	Largest lake in North Macedonia
39	Lacha	Ла́ча, Ла́че	Russia	356	137	
40	Siljan		Sweden	354	137	Group of lakes located in an impact crater
41	Manych-Gudilo	Маныч-Гудило	Russia	344	133	
42	Puula		Finland	330	130	
42	Torneträsk	Duortnosjávri, Torniojärvi	Sweden	330	130	
	Ivankovo	Ива́ньковское водохрани́лище	Russia	327	126	
44	Vodlozero	Водлозеро, Vodlajärvi	Russia	322	124	
	Lokka	Lokan tekojärvi	Finland	315	122	Largest reservoir in Finland
45	Umbozero	Умбозеро, Umbajärvi	Russia	313–422	121–163	
46	Neusiedl	Neusiedlersee, Fertő tó	Austria / Hungary	315	122	
47	Höytiäinen		Finland	282	109	
48	Great Prespa	Преспанско Езеро (Prespansko Ezero), Μεγάλη Πρέσπα (Megali Prespa), Liqeni i Prespës	Albania / Greece / North Macedonia	273	105	
49	Võrtsjärv	Wirzsee	Estonia	270	104	
50	Syamozero	Сямозеро, Säämäjärvi, Seämärvi	Russia	265–270	102–104	
51	Akkajaure		Sweden	261	101	Usually very much smaller, now heavily regulated for a Hydroelectric power plant.
	Iron Gates I	Đerdapsko jezero	Romania / Serbia	260	100	Lake impounded by the Iron Gates I dam on the River Danube
52	Middle Kuyto	Среднее Куйто, Keski-Kuittijärvi	Russia	257	99	
53	Näsijärvi		Finland	256	99	
	Đerdap		Serbia	253	98	
54	Hornavan		Sweden	252	97	(220–283 km^{2} (85–109 sq mi))
	Alqueva	Barragem de Alqueva	Portugal / Spain	250	97	Largest lake in Portugal
	Uglich	У́гличское водохрани́лище	Russia	249	96	
55	Yli-Kitka		Finland	237	92	
56	Suvasvesi		Finland	234	90	Double impact crater
57	Tikshozero	Тикшозеро, Tiiksjärvi	Russia	232	90	
58	Kemijärvi		Finland	231	89	
59	Keret	Кереть, Kierettijärvi	Russia	223	86	
60	Juojärvi		Finland	220	85	
61	Røssvatnet	Reevhtse	Norway	219	85	
62	Neuchâtel	Lac de Neuchâtel	Switzerland	218	84	Largest lake entirely in Switzerland
63	Nyuk	Нюк, Nuokkijärvi	Russia	214–230	83–89	
64	Maggiore	Lago Maggiore	Italy / Switzerland	212	82	
64	Seliger	Селигер	Russia	212	82	
66	Uddjaure		Sweden	210	81	(190–250 km^{2} (73–97 sq mi))
67	Pyhäjärvi	Пюхяярви	Finland / Russia	207	80	In Karelia
68	Femund		Norway	204	79	
68	Yanisyarvi	Янисъярви, Jänisjärvi	Russia	204	79	Located in an impact crater
70	Lough Corrib	Loch Coirib	Ireland	200	77	Largest lake in the Republic of Ireland
70	Lovozero	Ловозеро, Луяввьр, Luujäuˊrr, Lujávri, Luujärvi	Russia	200	77	
72	Upper Kuyto	Верхнее Куйто, Ylä-Kuittijärvi	Russia	198	76	
	Enonvesi		Finland	197	76	Part of Saimaa
	Narva	Narva veehoidla	Estonia / Russia	191	74	Largest reservoir in Estonia
73	Kiantajärvi		Finland	191	74	
74	Konnevesi		Finland	189	73	
75	Bolmen		Sweden	184	71	
76	Ströms vattudal		Sweden	183	71	
77	Ondozero	Ontajärvi	Russia	182	70	
78	Storuman		Sweden	173	67	
79	Storavan		Sweden	172	66	
	Lämmijärv		Estonia / Russia	171	66	Part of Peipus
80	Sinoe		Romania	171	66	
81	Mar Menor		Spain	170	66	Largest saline lake in Europe; Largest lake in Spain
82	Nilakka		Finland	169	65	
83	Koitere		Finland	167	64	
84	Leksozero	Лексозеро, Lieksajärvi	Russia	166	64	
85	Stora Lulevatten		Sweden	165	64	Regulated for hydro power generation
86	Iisvesi		Finland	164	63	
87	Åsnen		Sweden	159	61	
87	Juurusvesi–Akonvesi		Finland	159	61	
89	Étang de Berre	estanh de Bèrra, mar de Bèrra	France	155	60	
89	Pyhäjärvi		Finland	155	60	In Satakunta/Finland Proper
91	Kivijärvi		Finland	154	59	
92	Elton	Эльтон	Russia	150	58	
92	Vanajavesi		Finland	150	58	
	Porttipahta	Porttipahdan tekojärvi	Finland	149	58	Reservoir
94	Yalpug	Озеро Ялпуг	Ukraine	149	58	
95	Como	Lago di Como	Italy	146	56	
96	Lappajärvi		Finland	145	56	Located in an impact crater
97	Suontee		Finland	143	55	
98	Lower Kuyto	Нижнее Куйто, Ala-Kuittijärvi	Russia	141	54	
99	Randsfjorden		Norway	139	54	
99	Tyrifjorden		Norway	139	54	
101	Grevelingenmeer		Netherlands	138.7	53.6	Closed off part of the Rhine-Meuse estuary
102	Kallsjön		Sweden	135	52	
102	Viinijärvi		Finland	135	52	
104	Längelmävesi		Finland	133	51	
104	Skagern		Sweden	133	51	
106	Sommen		Sweden	132	51	
107	Dellensjöarna		Sweden	131	51	Group of lakes located in an impact crater
	Oskol	Оскільське водосховище, Оскольское водохранилище	Ukraine	130	50	
108	Kyyvesi		Finland	128	49	
	Tisza	Kisköre Reservoir, Tisza-tó, Kiskörei-víztározó	Hungary	127	49	
109	Trasimeno	Lago Trasimeno	Italy	124	48	
110	Engozero	Энгозеро	Russia	122	47	
110	Pyhäjärvi		Finland	122	47	In Oulu Province
110	Pyhäjärvi		Finland	122	47	In Tampere region
113	Kolvitskoye	Колвицкое озеро	Russia	121	47	
113	Snåsavatnet		Norway	121	47	
115	Stora Le and Foxen	Stora Le och Foxen	Sweden	119	46	
116	Lough Derg	Loch Deirgeirt	Ireland	118	46	
117	Keurusselkä		Finland	117	45	
117	Müritz	(Die) Müritz	Germany	117	45	Largest lake entirely in Germany
119	Baskunchak	Баскунчак	Russia	115	44	
120	Bolsena	Lago di Bolsena	Italy	114	44	Largest volcanic lake in Europe
120	Śniardwy		Poland	114	44	Largest lake in Poland
120	Lucerne	Vierwaldstättersee	Switzerland	114	44	
120	Onkivesi		Finland	114	44	
124	Mallasvesi–Roine		Finland	110	42	
124	Pielavesi		Finland	110	42	
126	Vesijärvi		Finland	108	42	
127	Lower Lough Erne	Loch Éirne	Northern Ireland	105	41	
127	Lough Ree	Loch Rí	Ireland	105	41	
127	Ontojärvi		Finland	105	41	
130	Mamry		Poland	104	40	
131	Kolima		Finland	101	39	
132	Tunnsjøen	Dåtnejaevrie	Norway	100	39	

== See also ==
- List of lakes by area
