= Ala-Kitka =

Lake in Kuusamo, Finland

- Location within Finland
- Location: Kuusamo, Finland
- Coordinates: 66°16′N 028°58′E
- Primary inflows: Raappanansalmi
- Primary outflows: Ilveskoski
- Catchment area: Koutajoki
- Basin countries: Finland
- Surface area: 48.5 km^{2} (18.7 sq mi)
- Average depth: 3.65 m (12.0 ft)
- Max. depth: 20.8 m (68 ft)
- Water volume: 0.179 km^{3} (0.043 cu mi)
- Shore length^{1}: 224.12 km (139.26 mi)
- Surface elevation: 240.4 m (789 ft)
- Islands: 50-100+
- ^{1} Shore length is not a well-defined measure.

Ala-Kitka is a medium-sized lake in the Koutajoki main catchment area. It is located in Kuusamo, Northern Ostrobothnia in Finland. It is connected with a bigger lake Yli-Kitka with a Raappanansalmi strait. The two lakes are collectively known as Kitkajärvi or simply Kitka.

== See also ==
- List of lakes in Finland
