= Lake Kamennoye (Karelia) =

Lake in Karelia, Russia, origin of Kamennaya

- Interactive map of Lake Kamennoye
- Location: Republic of Karelia
- Coordinates: 64.455°N 30.211°E
- Primary outflows: Kamennaya
- Catchment area: 572 km^{2} (221 sq mi)
- Max. length: 24.4 km (15.2 mi)
- Max. width: 12.1 km (7.5 mi)
- Surface area: 95.5 km^{2} (36.9 sq mi)
- Average depth: 8 m (26 ft)
- Max. depth: 26 m (85 ft)
- Water volume: 0.767 km^{3} (0.184 cu mi)
- Shore length^{1}: 193 km (120 mi)
- Surface elevation: 195 m (640 ft)
- Islands: 98
- ^{1} Shore length is not a well-defined measure.

Lake Kamennoye (Russian: Каменное; Karelian: Kiitehenjärvi) is a lake in the Republic of Karelia of Russia, near the town of Kostomuksha, covering an area of 95.5 square kilometers (36.9 sq mi). Its outflow is the river Kamennaya, which flows into Lake Nyuk. The lake is part of the Kostomuksha Nature Reserve.

== Geography ==
Lake Kamennoye is 24.4 kilometers (15.2 mi) long, 12.1 kilometers (7.5 mi) wide and its surface area is 95.5 square kilometers (36.9 sq mi). The lake has a volume of 0.767 cubic kilometers (0.184 cu mi), its average depth is 8 meters (26 ft) and the maximum depth is 26 meters (85 ft). There are 98 islands in total and the shoreline is about 193 kilometers (120 mi) long.

Lake Kamennoye is part of the Kem basin, discharging into the White Sea. The lake's own basin drains an area of 572 square kilometers (221 sq mi). The surface of the lake is located 195 meters (640 ft) above sea level. Its inflows include the rivers Karankayoki, Lyuttyayoki, Munanki, Lakhtiyoki and 42 smaller streams. The lake's outflow is the river Kamennaya, also known as Nogeusyoki. The Kamennaya discharges into Lake Nyuk.

Seventeen villages populated by Karelians used to exist by the lakeshore, with the biggest one being Babya Guba (Akonlahti). In 1958, the population of the area was relocated to other settlements, such as Kalevala and Voknavolok.

== Environmental values ==
Lake Kamennoye is part of the Kostomuksha Nature Reserve and is the biggest lake within it.

Fish found in the lake include common bleak, common bream, burbot, common dace, European bullhead, grayling, ide, minnow, ninespine stickleback, perch, pike, roach, ruffe, salmon, vendace and common whitefish.

The lake is used as a water supply for the town of Kostomuksha.
