= Kitka (disambiguation) =

Kitka may refer to:

- Kitka, Kitka Women's Vocal Ensemble, in Oakland, California, United States
- Brian Kitka, a character from the 30 Days of Night comic series
- Kitka, Varna Province, a village in Bulgaria
- Boris Kitka (born 1970), a Slovak football player and football manager
- Kitka Wind Farm, in Kamenica, Kosovo
- Battle of Kitka, on 26 July 1944 in Yugoslavia
- Kitkajärvi, a lake in Finland
- Kitkajoki, a river in Finland
