= Engozero (air base) =

- IATA: none; ICAO: XLPZ

Summary
- Airport type: Military
- Location: Karelia, Russia
- Elevation AMSL: 335 ft / 102 m
- Coordinates: 65°52′0″N 033°56′0″E
- Interactive map of Engozero

Runways
Direction	Length		Surface
Direction	ft	m	Surface
	6,562	2,000

Engozero was a military air base in Karelia, northwest Russia. It was near Engozero and Ambarnyy, 47 kilometers (29 mi) southeast of Loukhi in northern Karelia. Engozero was closed and the majority of the air base no longer exists.
