= Yli-Suolijärvi =

Lake in Posio, Finland

- Location within Finland
- Coordinates: 66.249°N 28.0707°E
- Catchment area: Kemijärvi
- Basin countries: Finland
- Surface area: 33.082 km^{2} (12.773 sq mi)
- Average depth: 4.16 m (13.6 ft)
- Max. depth: 18.23 m (59.8 ft)
- Water volume: 0.138 km^{3} (0.033 cu mi)
- Shore length^{1}: 220.21 km (136.83 mi)
- Surface elevation: 244.7 m (803 ft)
- Frozen: November-May
- Settlements: Posio
- ^{1} Shore length is not a well-defined measure.

Yli-Suolijärvi is a medium-sized lake in the Kemijoki main catchment area. It is located in Posio municipality, in the region of Lapland in northern Finland.

== See also ==
- List of lakes in Finland
