= Ala-Suolijärvi =

- Location within Lapland
- Coordinates: 66°19′48″N 28°11′10″E
- Type: Lake
- Basin countries: Finland
- Surface area: 55,885 km^{2} (21,577 sq mi)
- Surface elevation: 242.5 m (796 ft)
- Frozen: December–May
- Islands: 237
- Settlements: Posio

Ala-Suolijärvi–Oivanjärvi is a lake located in Posio in Finland.

== Presentation ==
According to SYKE, the two lakes Ala-Suolijärvi and Oivanjärvi at the same level are considered as a single lake named Suolijärvi–Oivanjärvi and numbered (65.392.1.001).

Lake Ala-Suolijärvi–Oivanjärvi has an area of 55,885 square kilometers and an elevation of 242.5 meters4.

The lake has 237 islands with a total area of 531 hectares, or about 8.7% of the lake's surface. The largest islands are Porosaari (95 ha) and Seimisaari (83 ha). Of the others, 38 islands are larger than one hectare and 195 larger than one hectare.
