= Yli-Kitka =

Lake in Finland

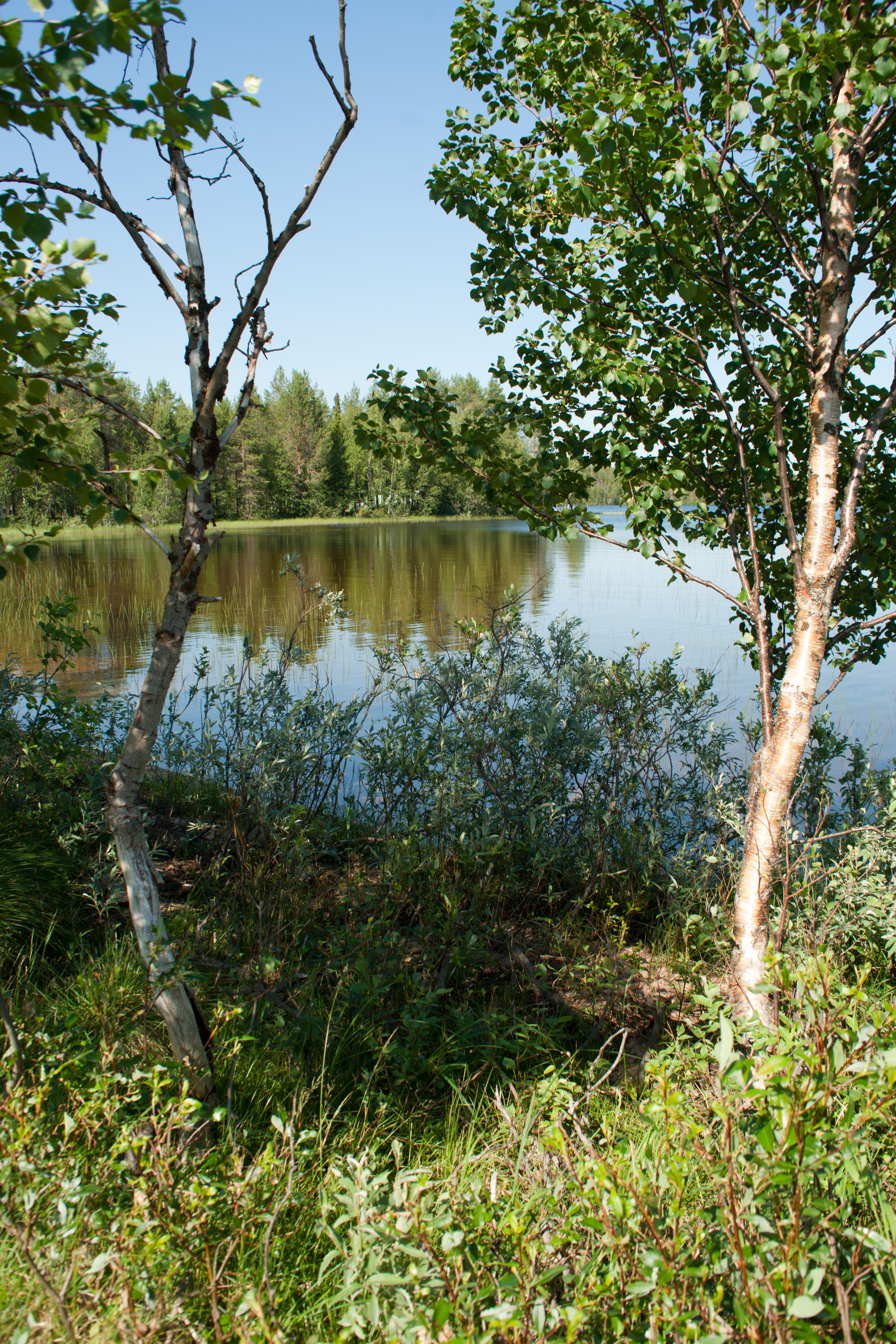

- Location within Finland

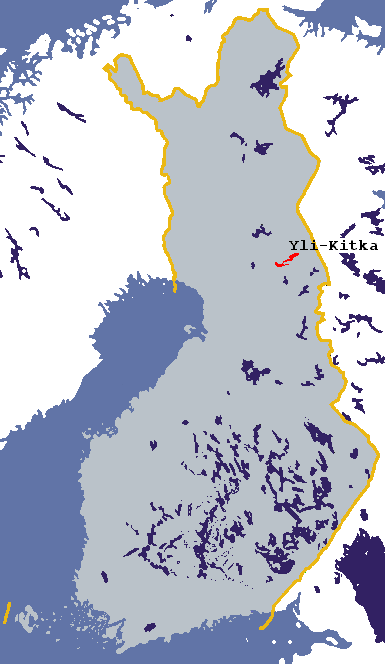
- Location of Yli-Kitka.
- Location: Kuusamo, Posio
- Coordinates: 66°08′N 028°32′E
- Primary outflows: Kitkanjoki
- Basin countries: Finland
- Surface area: 237.31 km^{2} (91.63 sq mi)
- Surface elevation: 240.4 m (789 ft)

Yli-Kitka is a lake in Finland, in the municipalities of Kuusamo and Posio. The lake is connected to the medium-sized lake Ala-Kitka at Kilkilösalmi strait. Yli-Kitka combined with Ala-Kitka is the largest unregulated lake in Finland. Together they are called Kitkajärvi or simply Kitka. Riisitunturi National Park is located north of the lake. From Ala-Kitka the waters flow through the Kitkanjoki river to the Oulankajoki river which is part of the Kovda River basin that drains into the White Sea in Russia.
