= Kostomuksha Nature Reserve =

Nature reserve in the Republic of Karelia, Russia

- Russian: Костомукшский заповедник (Also: Kostomukshsky)
- IUCN category Ia (strict nature reserve)
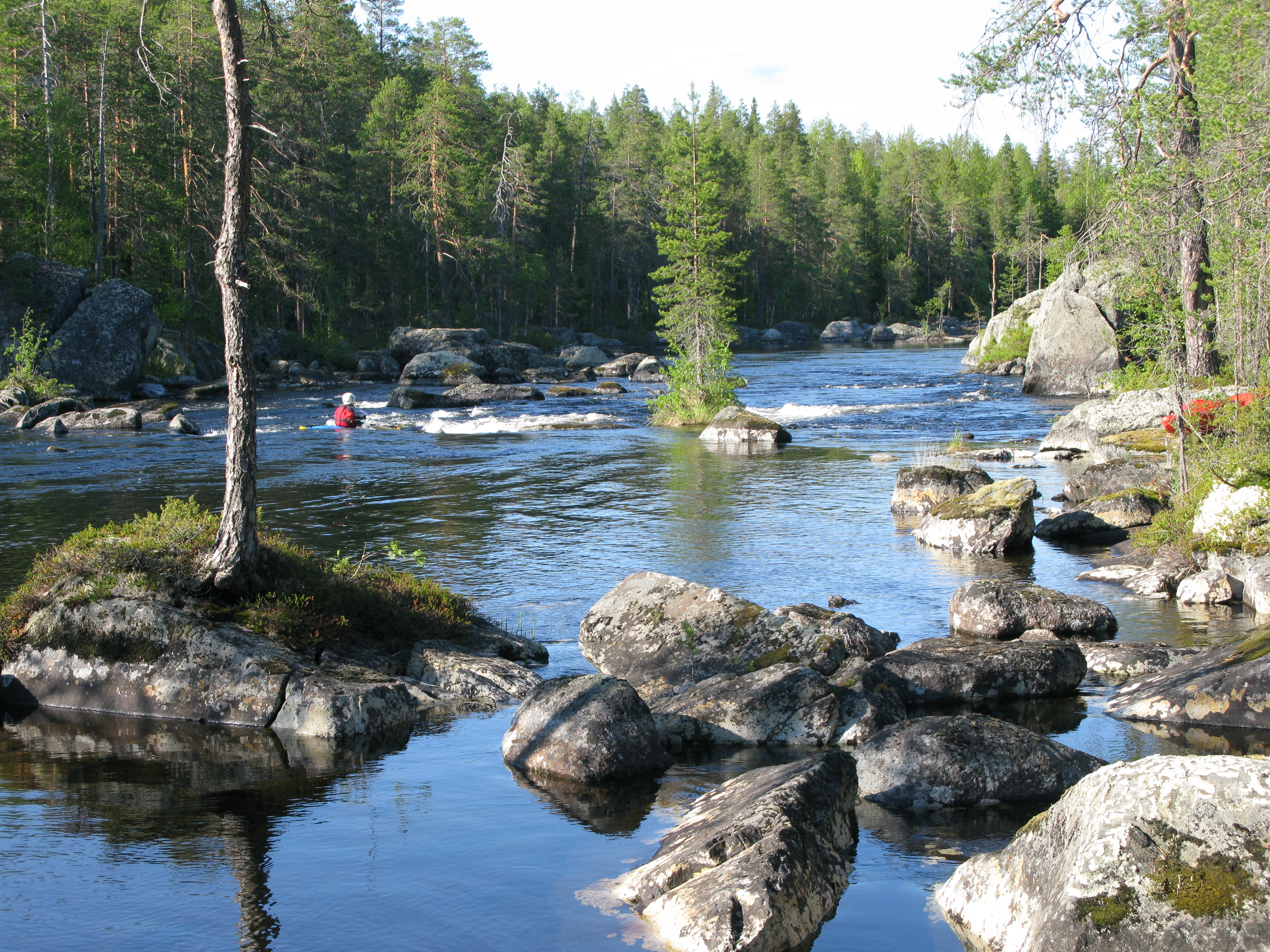
- Kamennaya River, in Kostamuksha Zapovednik

- Location within Russia
- Location: Republic of Karelia
- Nearest city: Kostomuksha
- Coordinates: 64°28′23″N 30°16′27″E
- Area: 47,569 hectares (117,546 acres; 184 sq mi)
- Established: 1983
- Governing body: Ministry of Natural Resources and Environment (Russia)
- Website: http://kost-zap.ru/

Kostomuksha Nature Reserve (Russian: Костомукшский заповедник) (also Kostomukshsky) is a Russian 'zapovednik' (strict ecological reserve) of forests, lakes, rivers and wetlands on the border of Russian and Finland. It was created in 1983, along with other protected areas, in part to mitigate the impact of the Karelskiy Okatysh mine outside of the town of Kostomuksha, one of the largest iron ore reserves in Russia, and also to protect the forest from increase commercial logging in the area. A further scientific purpose is the protection of forest reindeer and a type of landlocked salmon. The reserve is part of a transboundary reserve complex with reserves in Finland to the west (collectively called "Friendship"), and is situated in the Kalevalsky District and Muyezersky District of the Republic of Karelia, about 500 km north of St. Petersburg and 500 km west of Arkhangelsk. The reserve was created in 1993, and covers an area of 47,569 ha (183.66 sq mi).

== Topography ==
The terrain is flat or low hills of forest and wetlands. The area is within the Baltic Shield, on the eastern slopes of the West Karelian Hills. A dominant feature of the reserve is Lake Kamennoye ("Stone Lake"), which covers 20% of the reserve. The lake is of a roughly elongated shape, 24 km long by 12 km wide, and on average about 8 meters deep; it has 98 lakes and an irregular coastline. Water from the lake flows out through the Kamennaya River, to the Kem River, and on to the White Sea. There an additional 250 lakes, and 12% of the reserve is marsh.

== Climate and ecoregion ==
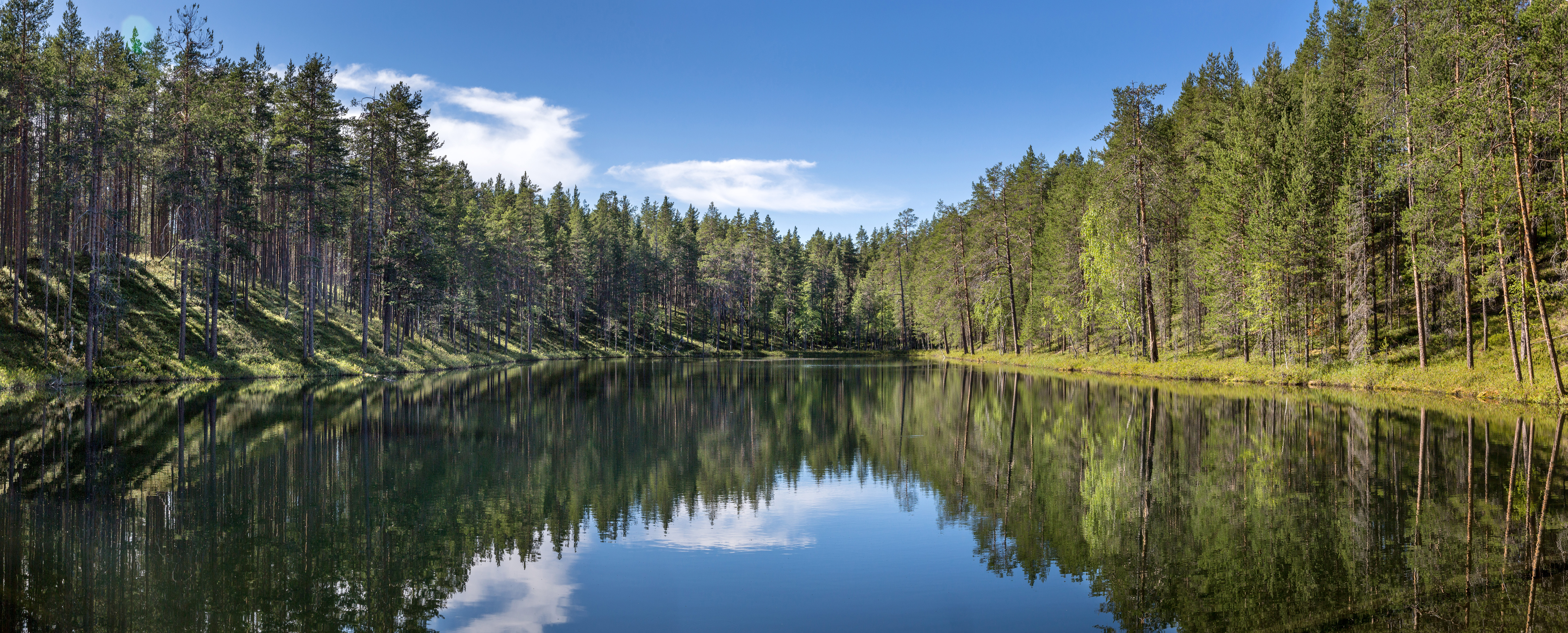
Kostomuksha Nature Reserve, 2014, photo by Igor Georgievskiy

Kostomuksha is located in the Scandinavian and Russian taiga ecoregion. Steppe with long ""ribbon forests"" of pine; about 300–500 miles more northerly than the European Russian forest. This ecoregion has more wetlands and more continental climate than the European forest steppe.

The climate of Kostamuksha is Humid continental climate, cool summer (Köppen climate classification (Dfc)). This climate is characterised by long cold winters, and short, cool summers. Kostomuksha is frost-free for an average 183 days per year.

== Flora and fauna ==
The geology and relief of the reserve cause high bogs with ridge-hollow wetland complexes, and the associated floral communities. The forests are mostly pine, with some spruce, birch and aspen. Underneath the sparse pine cover is moss, cranberry and blueberry. Herbaceous plants are not common. The animals of the reserve are those typical of the northern boreal forest: bear, wolf, elk, lynx, wolverine, rabbit, squirrel, marten, ermine, weasel. Beavers were introduced from Canada, and are a protected species in the reserve.

Because of the clean water in rivers and lakes, the reserve supports a diverse bird community - over 130 species have been reported, with more than 100 nesting. Of nesting birds, 3 species are Arctic avifauna, 34 are northern Siberian, 19 are typical of European deciduous forests, and the remainder are widespread. Fish in the rivers include pike, whitefish, perch, roach, grayling and lake salmon.

== Ecotourism ==
As a strict nature reserve, the Kostamucksha Reserve is mostly closed to the general public, although scientists and those with 'environmental education' purposes can make arrangements with park management for visits. There are however, six 'ecotourist' routes in the reserve that are open to the public, but require permits to be obtained in advance. Three of the routes are hiking trails, and three are water routes. The main office is in the city of Kostomuksha.

== See also ==
- List of Russian Nature Reserves (class 1a 'zapovedniks')
- National parks of Russia
- Protected areas of Russia
