= Korouoma =

Canyon in Lapland, Finland

Coordinates: 66°09′10″N 027°31′30″E

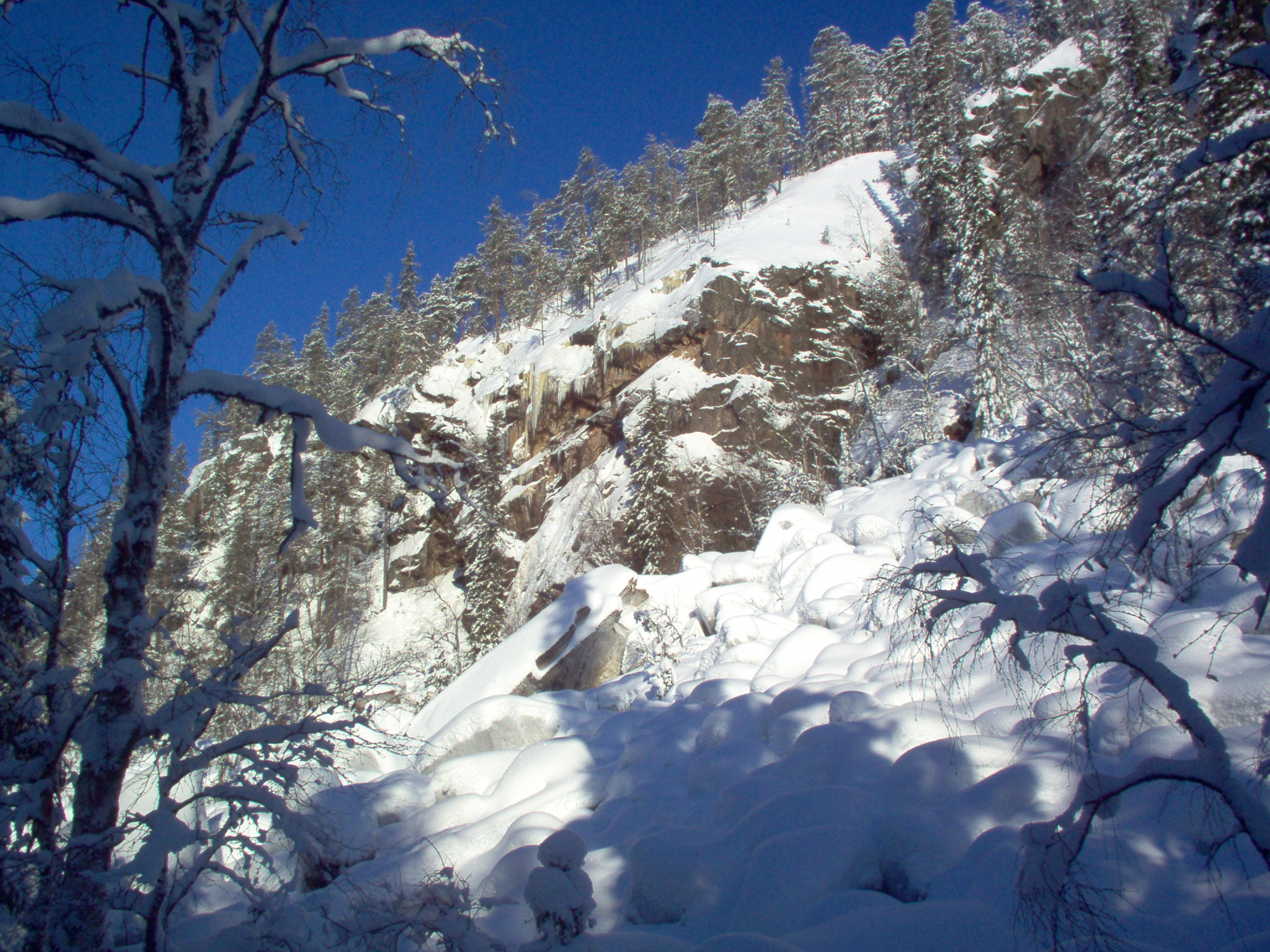
Picture from Korouoma.

Korouoma is about 30 kilometres (20 mi) long, few hundred metres wide and up to 130 m (430 ft) deep canyon at Posio, Finland. The entire area is a natural reserve. At the bottom of the canyon there's Korojoki River, which ends up to Kemijoki River. There are plenty of species in varied nature of Korouoma. Some of species found are rare. Korouoma offers great opportunities for hiking, watching the nature, fishing and reviewing the cultural history of usage of nature at the area.

Korouoma is fairly popular hiking area. There is a marked hiking path at the bottom of the Korouoma and several fireplaces, huts and cabins. Finnish Administration of Forests takes care of the routes and hiking related infrastructure there.

Part of Korouoma's distinctive nature are the cliffs both sides of it, where several streams freeze during the winter forming huge ice formations. Because of these ice formations Korouoma is known as the best ice climbing location in Finland. There are some climbing routes that can be used during the summer time as well.

There are signs pointing to Korouoma from Rovaniemi–Posio road (main road 81).

== History ==
There are signs of human settlement in the area from as early as in the late 19th century. The area's forests have been utilised for hundreds of years and the River Korojoki and its tributaries have been log floating routes. Signs of log floating are visible at the River Kurttajoki in the Koivuköngäs area. Other signs are the remains of an old loggers´ lean-to shelter by the trail leading down from Saukkovaara Hill and the remnants of an old log floating flume halfway down the River Korojoki.

The area's farmers have taken their cattle and sheep to graze in the natural meadows at the bottom of the valley. The grass in these meadows was also sometimes mowed, stored in barns and used as feed for livestock. Bears and eagles tended to prey on sheep. The foundations of old barns can still be found on the river bank. Some of the natural meadows and barns are to be restored so that future generations will be able to see them as well.

== Nature ==
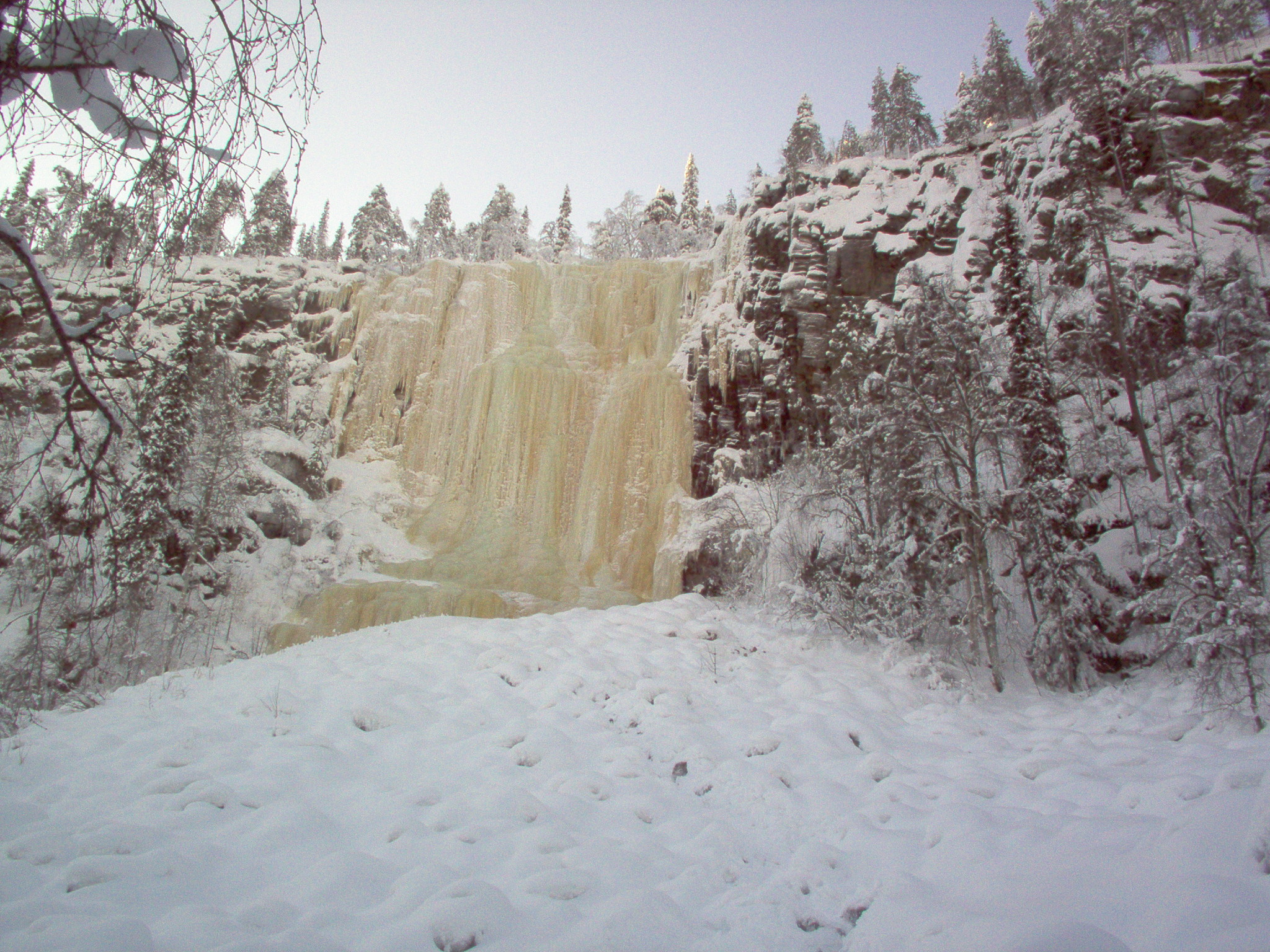
Ice fall at Korouoma.

At the centre of Korouoma the fracture valley forms a gorge which has worn down and become much deeper than the surrounding terrain. The walls of the gorge are cliff faces which are tens of metres high and extremely steep. Small streams which cascade down the cliff faces freeze into icy water falls during winter. They stay frozen till late spring.

The River Korojoki meanders and twists at the bottom of the canyon flowing towards the northwest. Its banks are lined by lush flood meadows and herb-rich forests. The vegetation in the northern part of the valley is lusher than in other parts of the valley indicating that the soil is calcareous. On the other hand, moderately dry and dry pine mineral soil forests are the typical vegetation type in the Lapiosalmi area. The terrain around the valley is varied, marked by hilly terrain and covered with old-growth forest. Between hills there are aapa bogs and spruce-covered hanging bogs characteristic of Northern Ostrobothnia.

== Climbing ==
There are at least seven named ice falls, most of them offering multiple routes, which are graded roughly between WI3 and WI6. The most obvious of these falls is the 1) Brown River (WI4/WI5), which is visible from the camping place at the bottom of Korouoma. Brown River is the highest of the falls, having up to 50 meters of ice suitable for climbing. Going up stream (left) from Brown River, one encounters 2) Mammoth (WI3), 3) Charlie (WI3/WI4), 4) Way of the Wind (WI3+/WI4) and Northern Lights (WI3+). Going down (right) from the Brown River, there's 5) Monk cave (WI5+/WI6), which is pretty close, and then 6) Angel Fall (WI3) and 7) Wolf's teeth, which both are much further down the Korouoma. Except for Monk Cave all of these falls are on the south side of the Koro River.

In addition to these there are several such falls, that don't necessarily have names and might not be there every year.

Though Korouoma is especially known for its ice climbing, there are plenty of cliffs to be climbed throughout the year.

== See also ==
- Ice Climbing
