= Kitkajärvi =

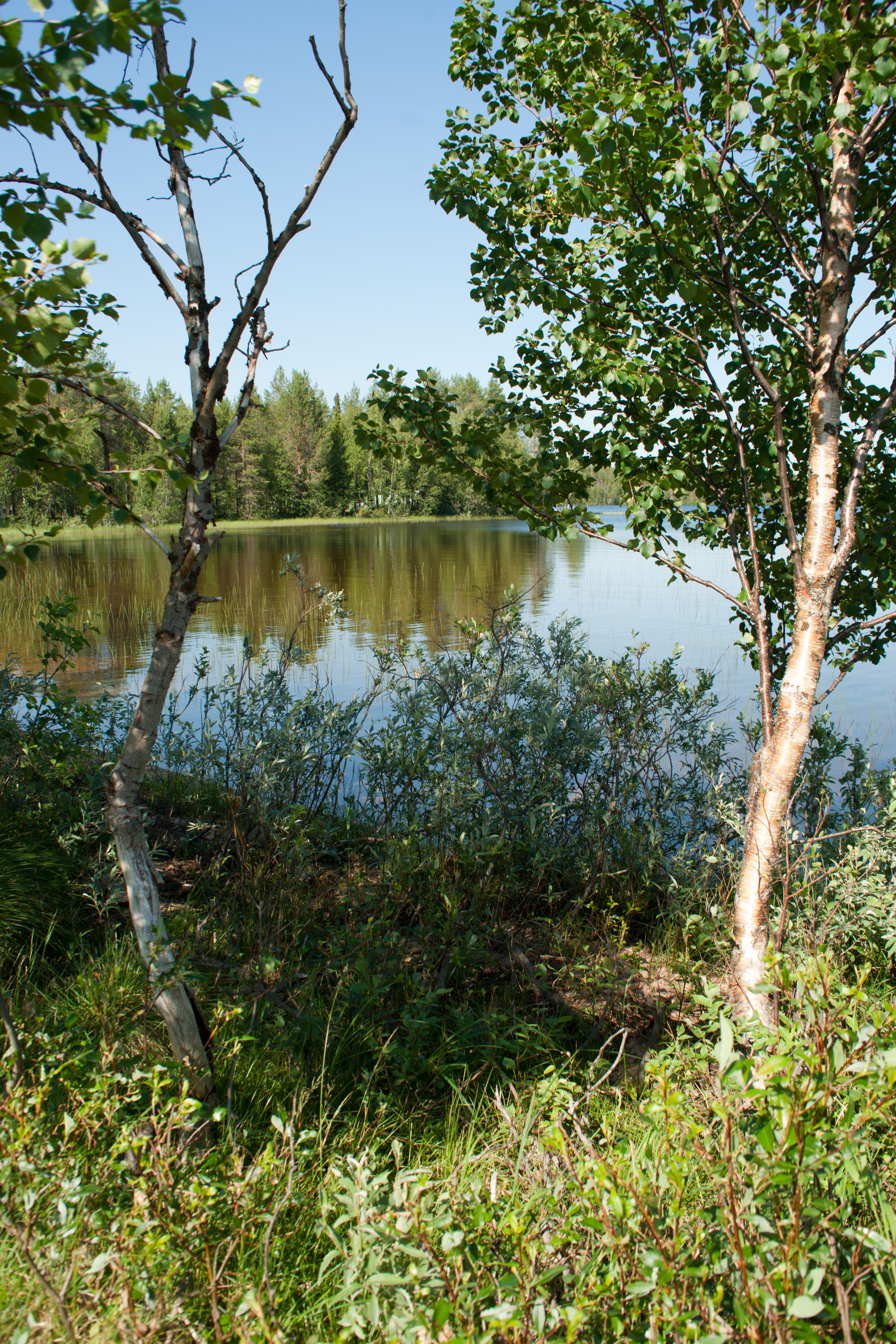
- Yli-Kitka

- Location within Lapland
- Location: Posio, Kuusamo
- Coordinates: 66°10′N 028°39′E
- Type: lake
- Catchment area: Kitkajoki
- Basin countries: Finland
- Surface area: 285.81 km^{2} (110.35 sq mi)
- Water volume: 1.742 km^{3} (1,412,000 acre⋅ft)
- Surface elevation: 240.4 m (789 ft)
- Frozen: November–May
- Islands: Lososaari
- Settlements: Posio

Lake Kitkajärvi is a rather large lake of Finland. It is situated partly in Posio in Lapland region and partly in Kuusamo municipality in Northern Ostrobothnia region, and belongs to the Koutajoki main catchment area. The southern part of the lake is called Yli-Kitka (meaning Upper Kitka) and northern part is called Ala-Kitka (meaning Lower Kitka). Kitkajärvi is 14th biggest lake in Finland. It is also the biggest unregulated lake, because there are no power stations on its outflow. Rather big part of the lake is protected in the Natura 2000 protection program. The water in the lake is very clean. There is a route around the lake for paddlers.

== See also ==
- List of lakes in Finland
- Posiolapland.com - Posio Tourism
