= Oulankajoki =

River in Finland and Russia

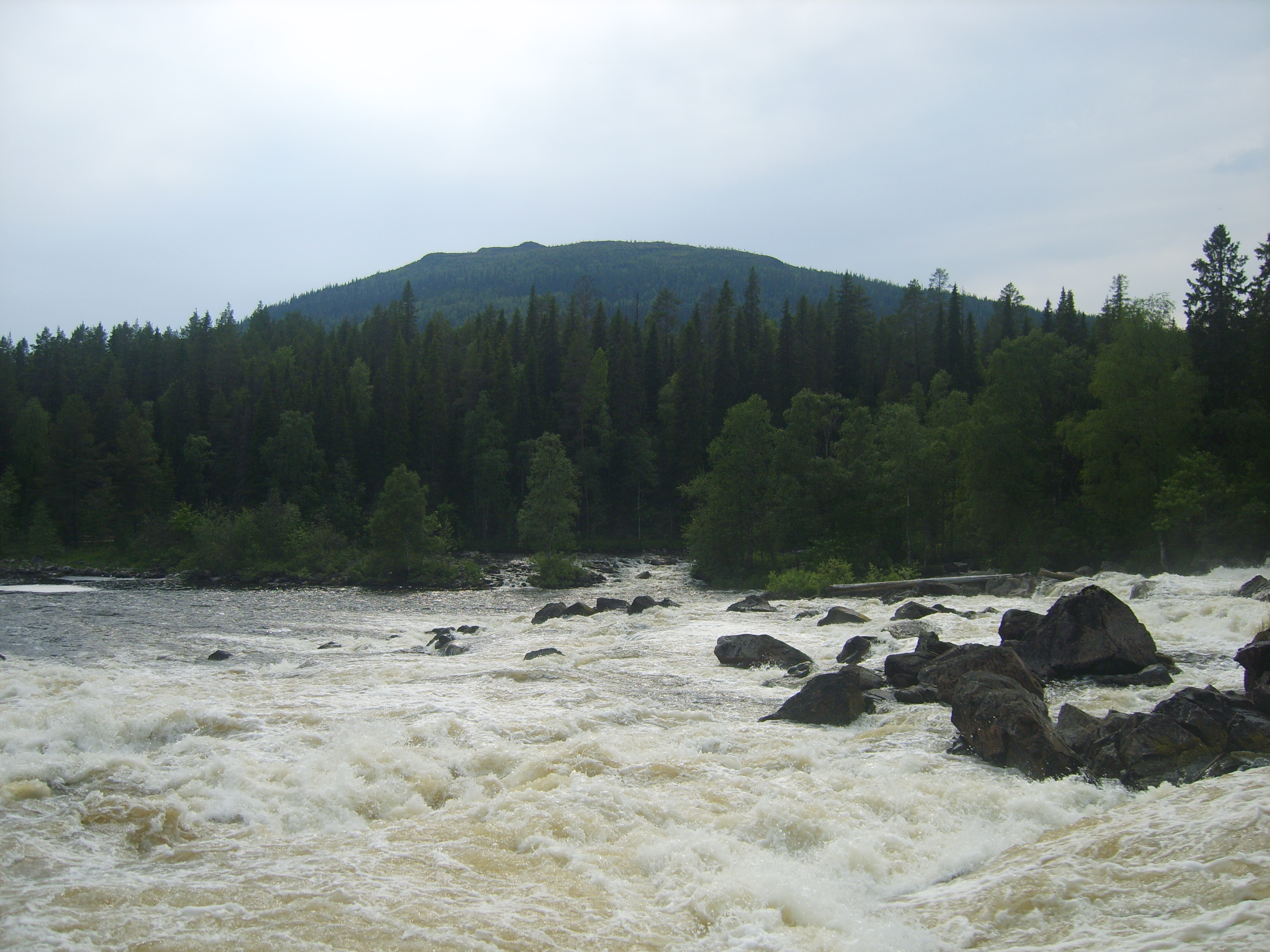

Location
- Countries: Finland; Russia

Physical characteristics
- Mouth: Lake Pyaozero
  - coordinates: 66.1498°N 30.6116°E
- Length: ca. 135 km
- Basin size: 5,670 km^{2} (2,190 sq mi)

Basin features
- Progression: Lake Pyaozero→ Kovda→ White Sea
- Tributaries
  - right: Kitkajoki

The Oulankajoki (Russian: Оланга - Olanga) is a river of Finland and Russia (Republic of Karelia). It is part of the Kovda river system. The Oulankajoki discharges into the Lake Pyaozero in the Republic of Karelia in Russia, which is drained by the Kovda towards the White Sea. Its length within Russia is 67 kilometres (42 mi), and it has a drainage basin of 5,670 square kilometres (2,190 sq mi).

== See also ==
- List of rivers of Finland
