= Livojärvi =

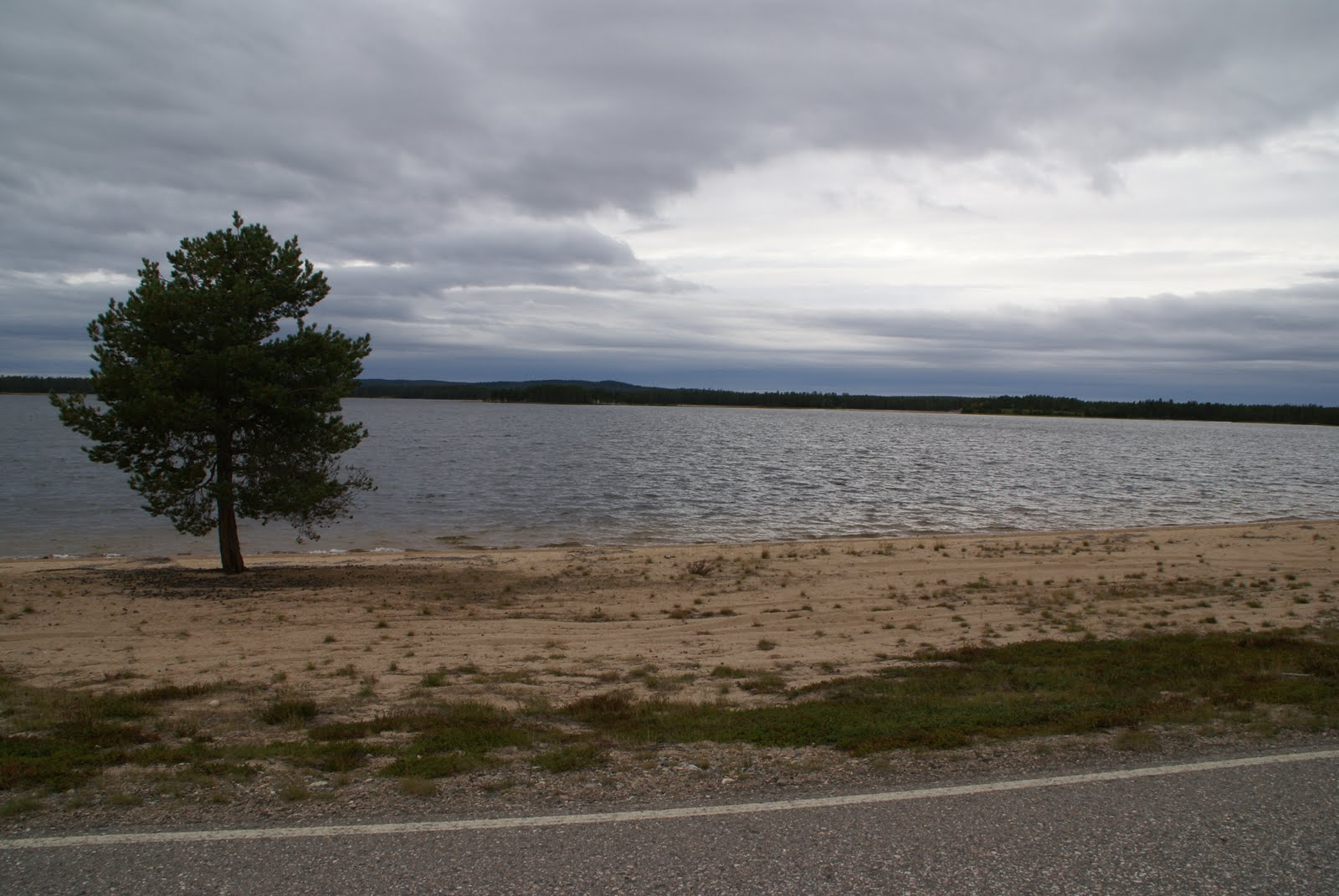

- Location within Lapland
- Coordinates: 66°00′N 28°12′E
- Type: Lake
- Primary outflows: river Livojoki, canal Kirveskanava
- Catchment area: Iijoki
- Basin countries: Finland
- Surface area: 32.959 km^{2} (12.726 sq mi)
- Average depth: 5.78 m (19.0 ft)
- Max. depth: 28 m (92 ft)
- Water volume: 0.192 km^{3} (156,000 acre⋅ft)
- Shore length^{1}: 118.25 km (73.48 mi)
- Surface elevation: 243.7 m (800 ft)
- Frozen: December–May
- Islands: none
- Settlements: Posio
- ^{1} Shore length is not a well-defined measure.

Livojärvi is a medium-sized lake in the Iijoki main catchment area. It is located in Posio municipality, in the Lapland region in Finland. Quality of water is good.

== See also ==
- List of lakes in Finland
- Posiolapland.com - Posio Tourism
