= Storuman (lake) =

Lake in Sweden

Storuman Lake
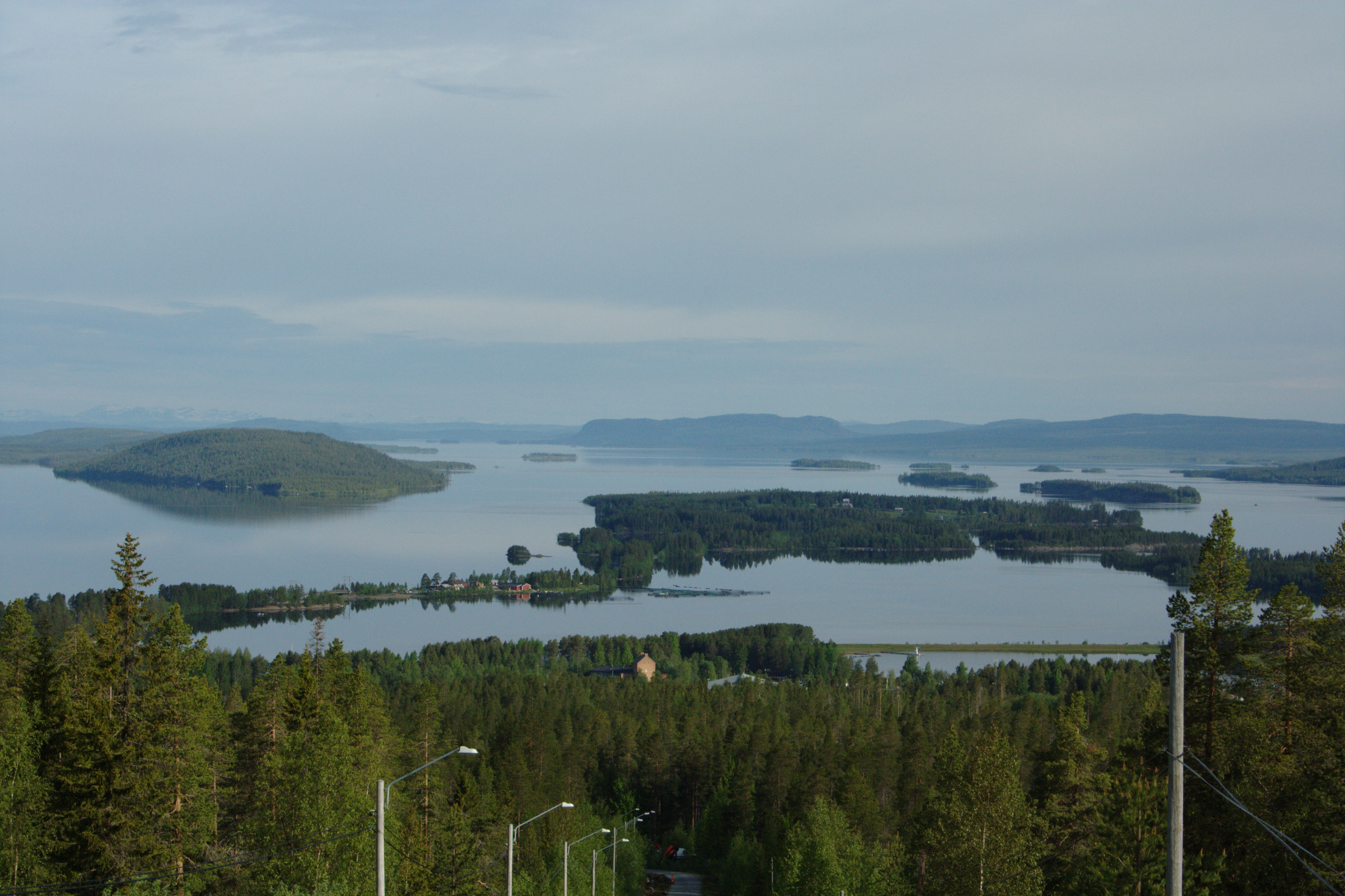
- View of Storuman Lake from Stenseleberget

- Location within Sweden
- Location: Sweden
- Coordinates: 65°13′10″N 16°52′10″E

Storuman is a lake in Sweden. The lake is 148 metres (486 ft) deep, has an area of 171 square kilometres (66 sq mi) and is 351 metres (1,152 ft) above sea level.

The Ume River flows through the lake and has a maximum depth of 148 metres (486 ft). At the southeastern end is the town of Storuman.

The lake consists of two clearly distinguishable parts. The approximately 30-kilometre (19 mi) long northwestern part is narrow and winding and is surrounded by 400–500-metre (1,300–1,600 ft) high, steep mountainsides. Here the lake is up to 112 metres (367 ft) deep with a simultaneous width of 500 metres (1,600 ft). The southeastern part is up to 6 kilometres (3.7 mi) wide with almost continuous shorelines. In this area, there are flat surroundings and protruding sandy headlands. In the southern part of the lake there is also the island of Luspholmen.

== Geography ==
Lake Storuman is located in Storuman Municipality. Its depth is 135 metres (443 ft), its width is 6 kilometres (3.7 mi), and its length is 6 kilometres (3.7 mi). Storuman is a lake in the Swedish province of Lapland, Västerbotten County The lake has an area of almost 171 km^{2} (66 sq mi) and is up to 122 metres (400 ft) deep. The Ume river flows through it.

== Hydroelectric power ==
The lake is also a water reservoir for the hydroelectric power plants on this river, with a difference of up to 7 metres (23 ft).

== Regions ==
The lake consists of two different regions. The 30 km (19 mi) long northwestern part is narrow and winding between steep mountain slopes up to 500 metres (1,600 ft) high. The deepest parts up to 112 metres (367 ft), with a width of up to 500 metres (1,600 ft). The southeastern part is up to 6 km (3.7 mi) wide and has relatively flat banks and sandy peninsulas.

== See also ==
- List of largest lakes of Europe
