= Lake Tikshozero =

Lake in the country of Russia

Lake Tikshozero Тикшозеро
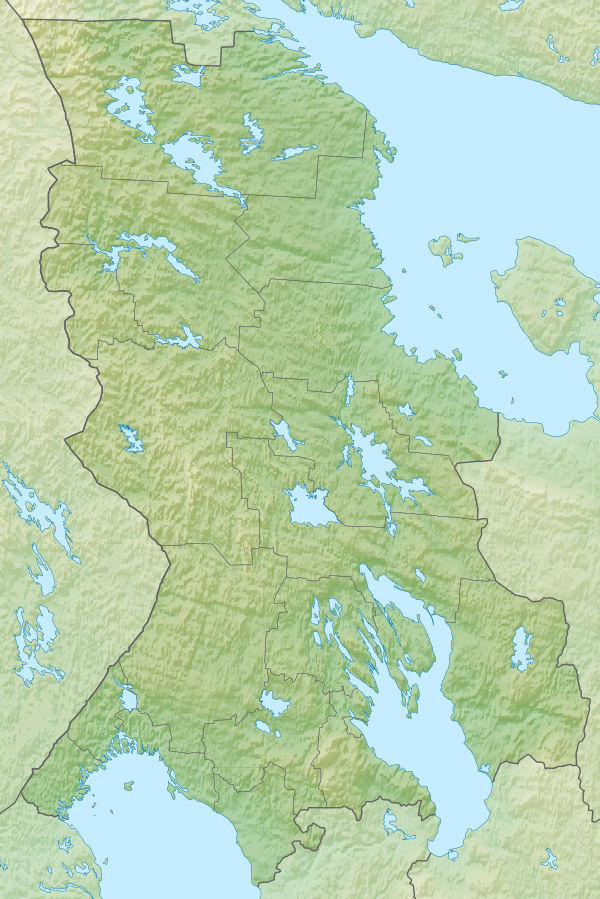
- Location within Karelia
- Location: Republic of Karelia
- Coordinates: 66°16′N 31°52′E
- Primary inflows: Lopskaya
- Primary outflows: Lopskaya
- Catchment area: 1,080 square kilometres (420 mi^{2})
- Basin countries: Russia
- Surface area: 209 square kilometres (81 mi^{2})
- Surface elevation: 111.2 m (365 ft)

Lake Tikshozero (Russian: Тикшеозеро, Тикшозеро, Finnish Tiiksjärvi) is a freshwater lake, located in Loukhsky District of the Republic of Karelia and in Kandalakshsky District of Murmansk Oblast in Russia. It is one of the biggest lakes in Karelia. The area of the lake is 209 square kilometres (81 mi^{2}), and the area of its basin is 1,080 square kilometres (420 mi^{2}). The outflow of the lake of the Lopskaya, which flows north as two separate streams (the Pudos and the Vincha) into Lake Kovdozero and belongs to the drainage basin of the Kovda and of the White Sea.

The lake has a very sophisticated form, with a big number of islands. Almost all of the lake area lies in the Republic of Karelia, and only a gulf which serves as the outflow of the Pudos River is located in Murmansk Oblast. The biggest island on the lake is Kaygas Island, located in the northwestern part of the lake. The main inflow of the lake is also the Lopskaya River, also known in this stretch as the Bolshaya River.

Th catchment area of Lake Tikshozero is relatively small for a lake of this area. It includes areas in the north of Loukhsky District, mostly located southwest of the lake. The biggest lake in the drainage basin of Lake Tikshozero is Lake Sennozero.

The lakeshore is not populated.
