= Nilakka =

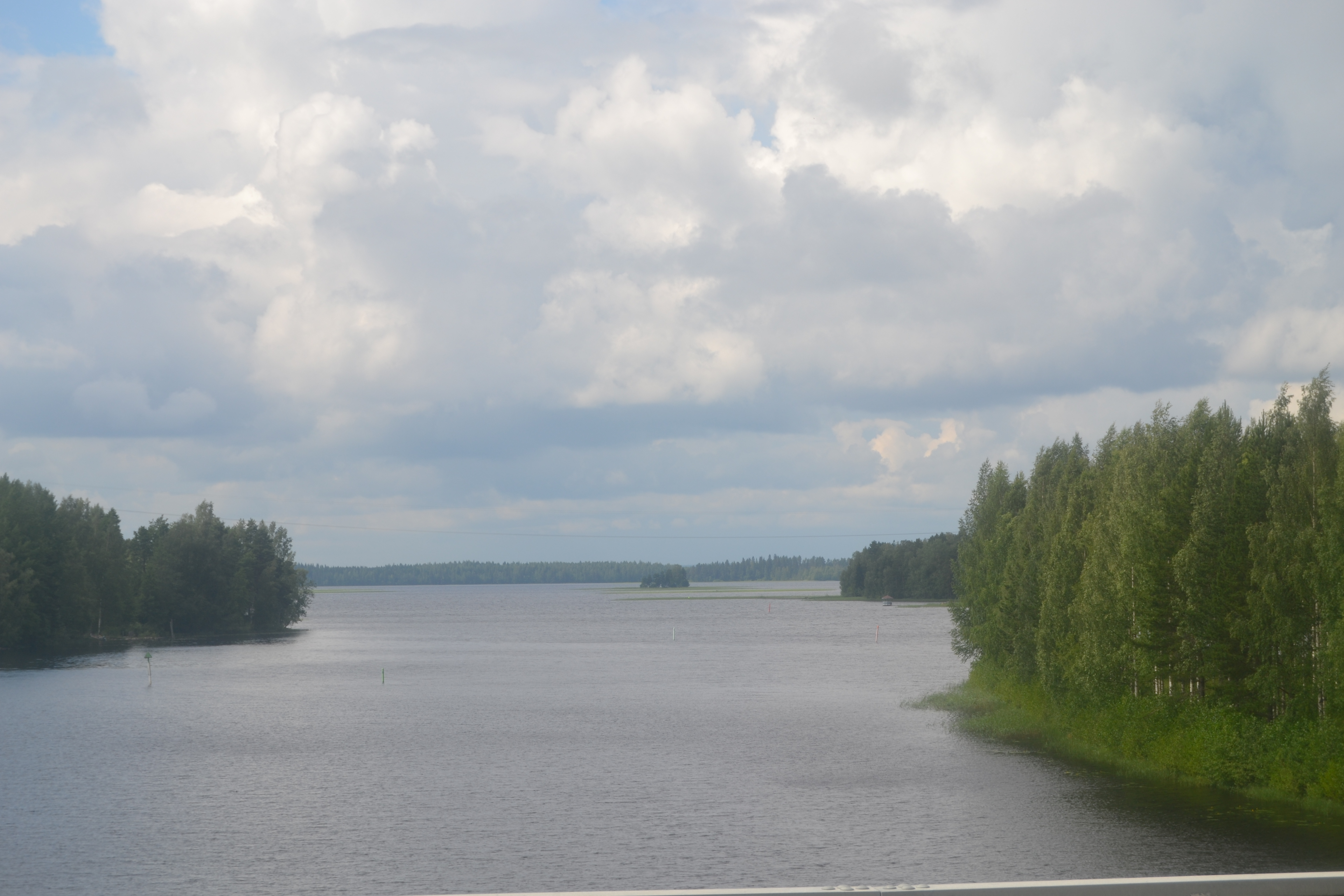

- Location within Finland
- Location: Northern Savonia
- Coordinates: 63°05′N 26°31′E
- Type: Lake
- Primary inflows: Säviänvirta
- Primary outflows: Äyskoski rapids, lake Iisvesi
- Catchment area: Kymijoki
- Basin countries: Finland
- Max. length: over 40 km (25 mi)
- Max. width: max 10 km (6.2 mi)
- Surface area: 168.51 km^{2} (65.06 sq mi)
- Average depth: 4.86 m (15.9 ft)
- Max. depth: 21.74 m (71.3 ft)
- Water volume: 0.821 km^{3} (666,000 acre⋅ft)
- Shore length^{1}: 357.81 km (222.33 mi)
- Surface elevation: 102.2 m (335 ft)
- Islands: 150
- Settlements: Keitele
- ^{1} Shore length is not a well-defined measure.

Nilakka is a rather large lake in Northern Savonia, Finland. With the area of nearly 169 km^{2} it is the 25th largest lake in the country. It's a shallow lake, connected by canals to upper Lake Pielavesi and lower Iisvesi.
