= Lake Pyaozero =

Lake in the country of Russia

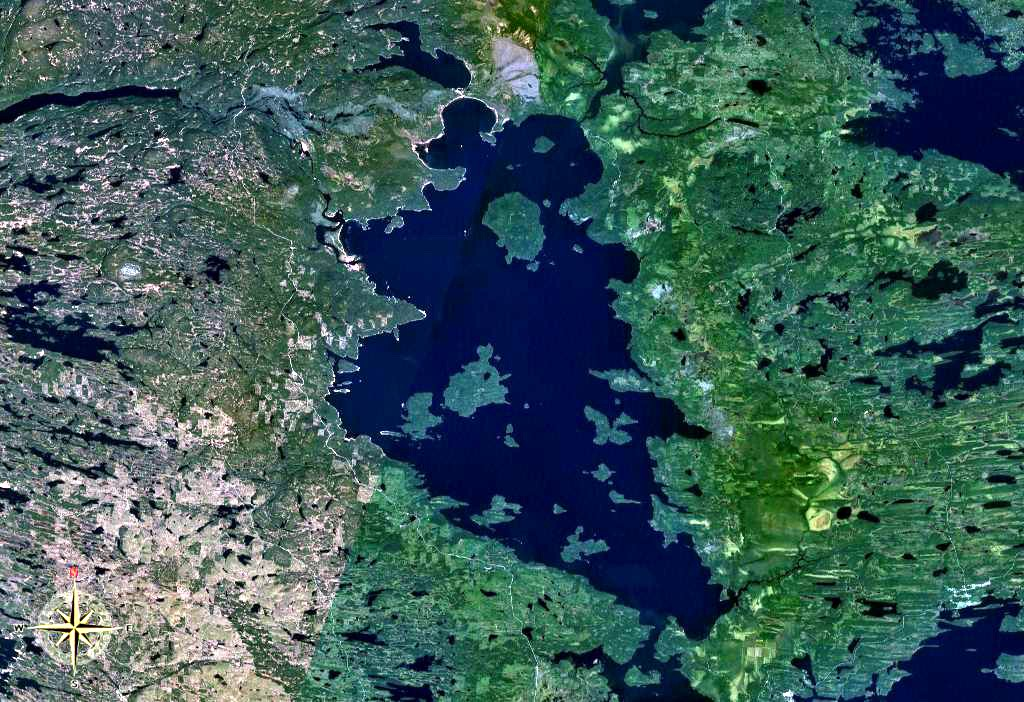
- Lake Pyaozero seen from space

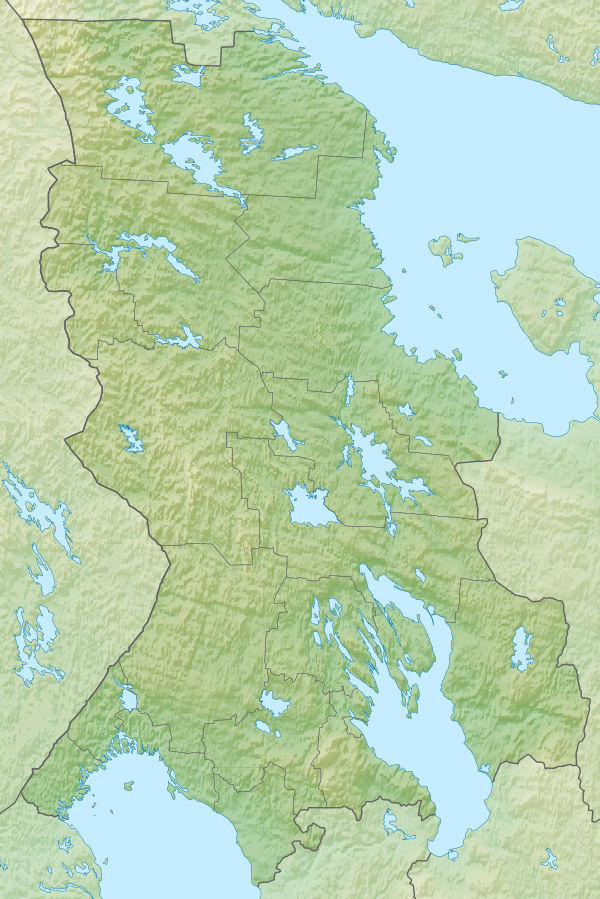
- Location within Karelia
- Location: Republic of Karelia
- Coordinates: 66°05′N 30°58′E
- Primary inflows: Kovda, Oulankajoki
- Primary outflows: Kovda
- Basin countries: Russia
- Surface area: 659 km^{2} (254 sq mi)

Lake Pyaozero (Russian: Пяозеро, Karelian: Piäjärvi, Finnish: Pääjärvi) is a large freshwater lake in the Republic of Karelia, northwestern part of Russia. It has an area of 659 km^{2}, and it is drained by the river Kovda. There are many islands on the lake with total area of 186 km^{2}. Among the rivers that flow into lake Pyaozero is the river Oulankajoki that begins in Finland, where one of its tributaries is the river Kitkanjoki that begins from lake Kitkajärvi in Finland. From south also the waters of Lake Topozero in the Republic of Karelia flow into the Lake Pyaozero.
