= Kitkajoki =

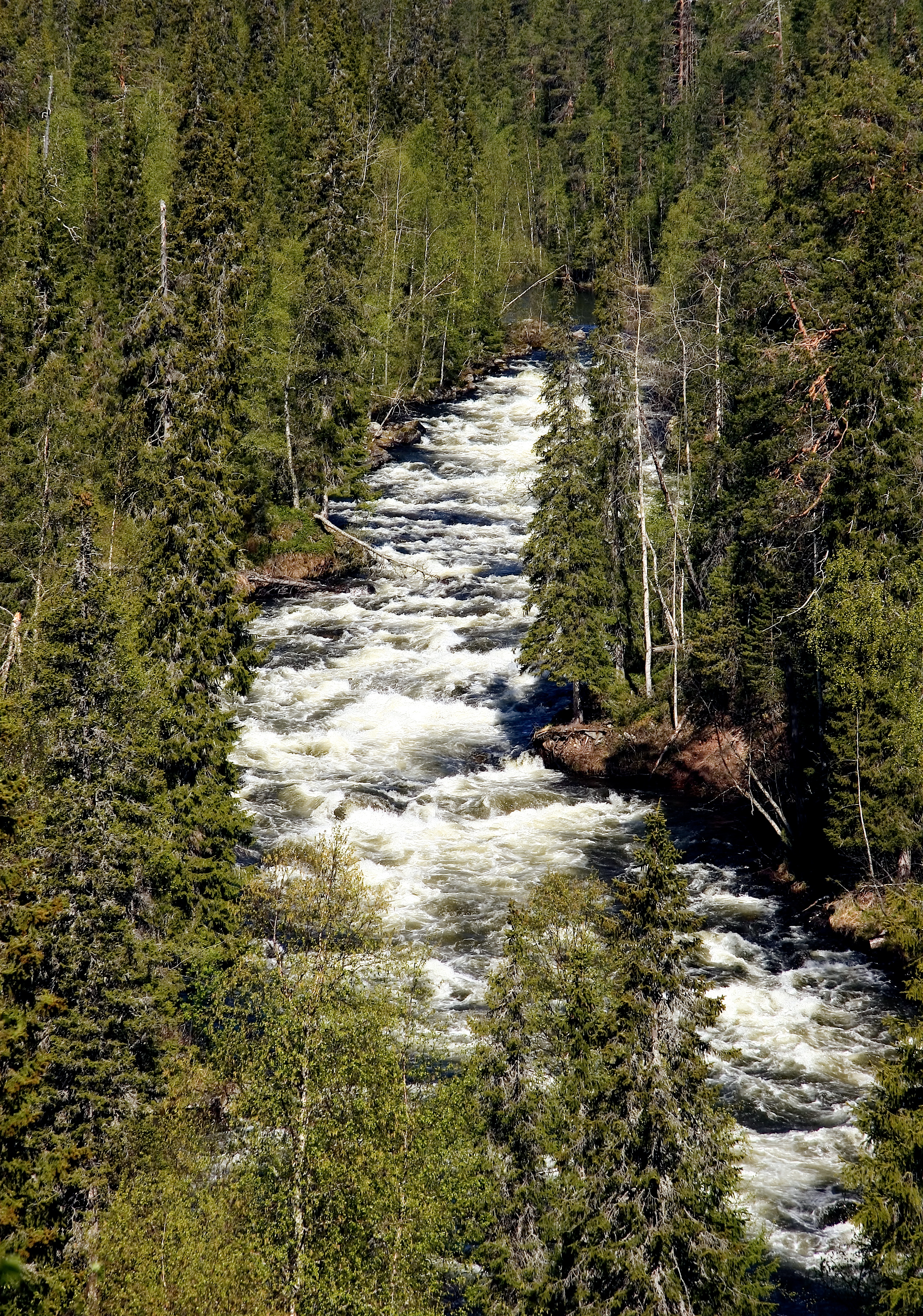
- Aallokkokoski rapid

Location
- Country: Finland

Physical characteristics
- Mouth: Oulankajoki
  - coordinates: 66.2834°N 29.6473°E

Basin features
- Progression: Oulankajoki→ Lake Pyaozero→ Kovda→ White Sea

Kitkajoki or Kitkanjoki is a river of Finland. It begins from the lake Ala-Kitka that is connected to the lake Yli-Kitka in the municipalities of Posio and Kuusamo in the region of Northern Ostrobothnia and flows then towards Russia joining the river Oulankajoki near the Russian border. It is a part of the Kovda river system in Russia and Finland from which the waters flow to the White Sea.

== See also ==
- List of rivers of Finland
