= Lake Topozero =

Lake in the country of Russia

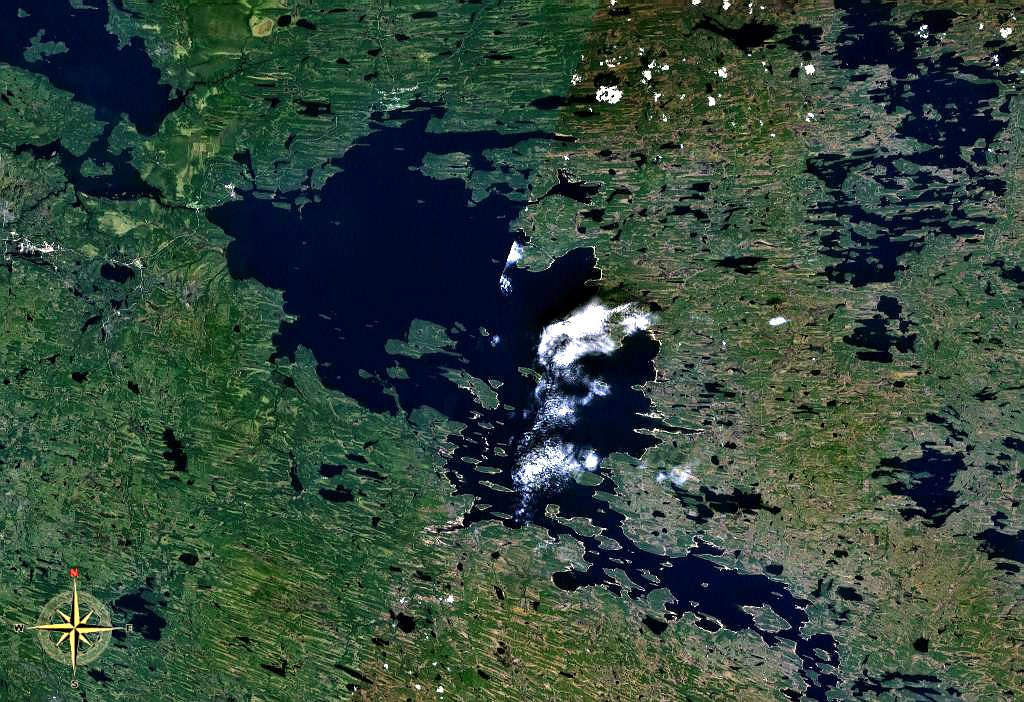
- from space

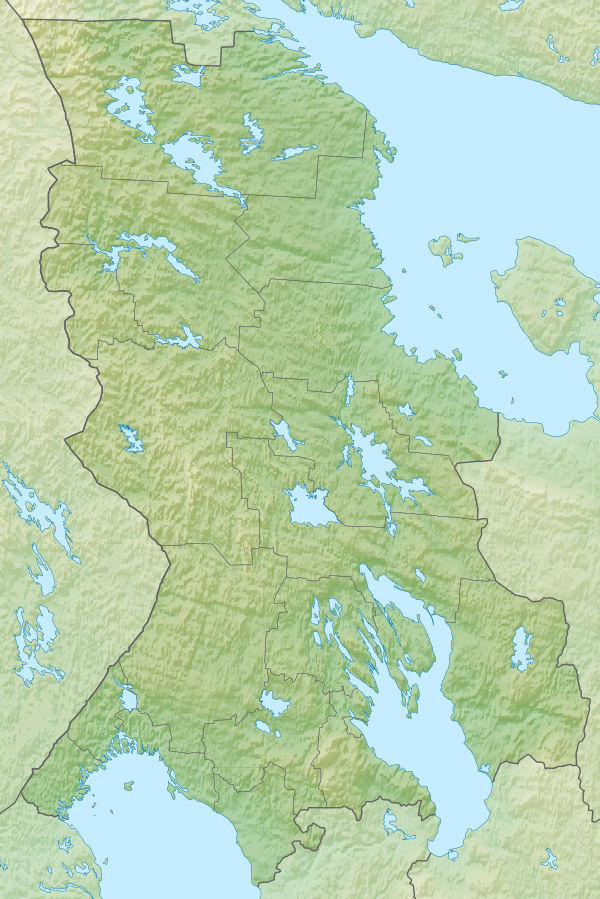
- Location within Karelia
- Location: Republic of Karelia
- Coordinates: 65°40′N 32°00′E
- Primary outflows: Kovda (Sofyanga)
- Basin countries: Russia
- Max. length: 75.3 km (46.8 mi)
- Max. width: 30.3 km (18.8 mi)
- Surface area: 986 km^{2} (381 sq mi)
- Max. depth: 50 m (160 ft)
- Islands: 100+

Lake Topozero (Russian: Топозеро, Finnish: Tuoppajärvi) is a large freshwater lake in the Republic of Karelia, northwestern part of Russia. It has an area of 986 square kilometres (381 sq mi) long, and a drainage basin of 3,530 square kilometres (1,360 sq mi). It is 75.3 km long and 30.3 km wide. Maximum depth is about 50 m. There are more than 100 islands on the lake. Topozero is used for fishery and timber rafting. Its primary outflow is the Kovda, which is also called Sofyanga in its first stretch from Lake Topozero to Lake Pyaozero. The Kovda flows to the White Sea.
