= Foxen =

Foxen is a surname. Notable people with the surname include:

- Alex Foxen (born 1991), American poker player
- Bill Foxen (1879–1937), American baseball pitcher
- James Foxen (c. 1769–1829), English hangman
