= Lake Nyuk =

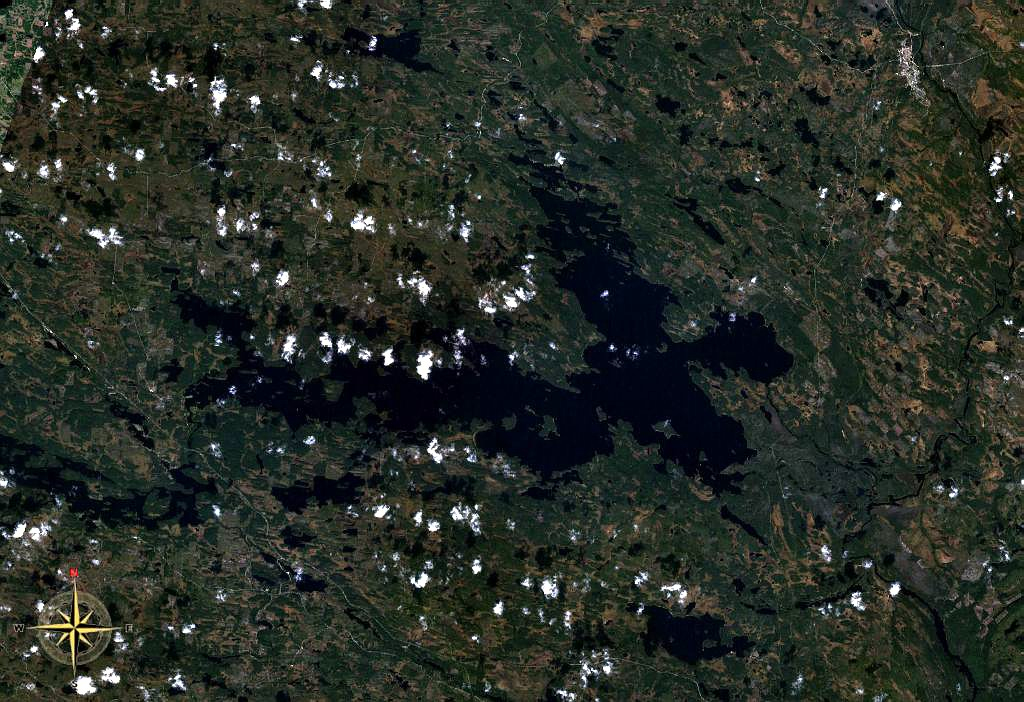
- Lake Nyuk seen from space

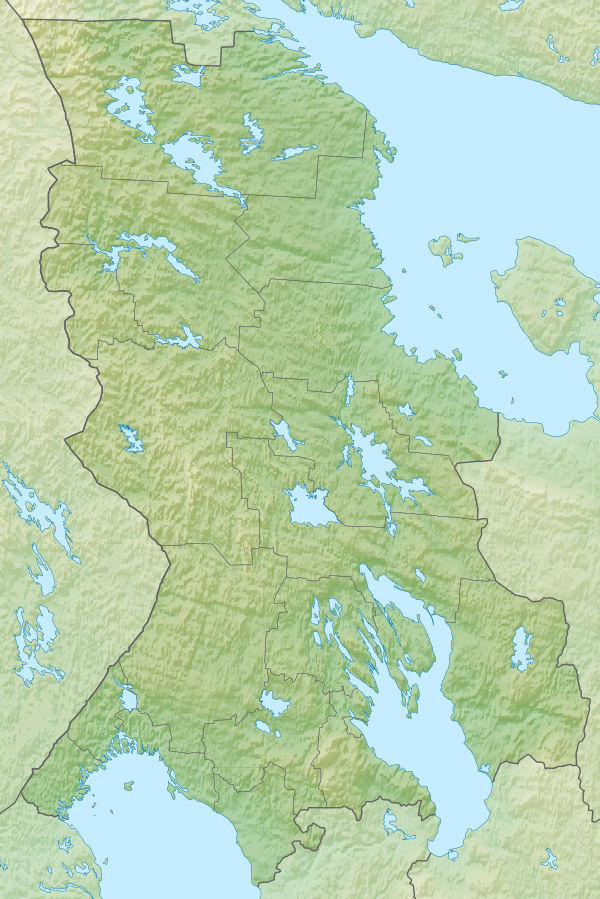
- Location within Karelia Location within Russia
- Location: Republic of Karelia
- Coordinates: 64.45°N 31.75°E
- Type: Lake
- Primary inflows: Rastas, Häme
- Basin countries: Russia
- Surface area: 214–230 square kilometres (83–89 sq mi)
- Average depth: 8.5 metres (28 ft)
- Max. depth: 40 metres (130 ft)
- Water volume: 1.81 cubic kilometres (0.43 cu mi)
- Shore length^{1}: 255 kilometres (158 mi)
- Surface elevation: 134 metres (440 ft)
- Islands: 126
- ^{1} Shore length is not a well-defined measure.

Lake Nyuk(Russian: Нюк, Finnish and Karelian: Nuokkijärvi) is a large freshwater lake in the Republic of Karelia, northwestern part of Russia. It is located at 64.45°N 31.75°E and has an area of 214–230 km^{2} (83–89 sq mi). There are numerous islands on the lake. The lake is part of the Kem River basin.

== General information ==
The surface area is 214 km², the catchment area is 3090 km².

It has a blade shape. The coast is high and rocky. Food snow and rain. The level fluctuation range is 70 cm. It is covered with ice from the end of October to the end of April.

There are 126 islands on the lake with a total area of about 10.3 km². The largest islands: Thorayssari (1.13 km²), Vezansari, Kurchunsari, Papinsari, Keurunsari, Hernesari.

The average amplitude of the level fluctuation is 0.9 m.

The name Nyuk is translated from Karelian as Swan.

== Water Sources ==
12 rivers flow into the lake. The largest ones are: Nogeusjoki^{(ru)}, Kangashoya^{(ru)} and Vaivaoya^{(ru)}. The Rastas^{(ru)}and Khyame^{(ru)}rivers flow out (tributaries of the Chirko-Kem river^{(ru)}, Kem river basin ).

=== Lakes ===
The Nyuk basin also includes lakes:

- Uimusejärvi^{(ru)}
- Elmisyarvi^{(ru)}
- Mushtalaksi^{(ru)}
- Kormusjärvi^{(ru)}

A large area of the bottom is occupied by silty soils. In the bays, the higher aquatic vegetation is represented by reeds, horsetails, pondweeds.

Vendace, whitefish, pike, perch, roach, bream, burbot, and ruff live in the lake.

== See also ==
- Lakes of Karelia^{(ru)}
- Republic of Karelia
