= Riisitunturi National Park =

National park in Lapland, Finland

- IUCN category II (national park)
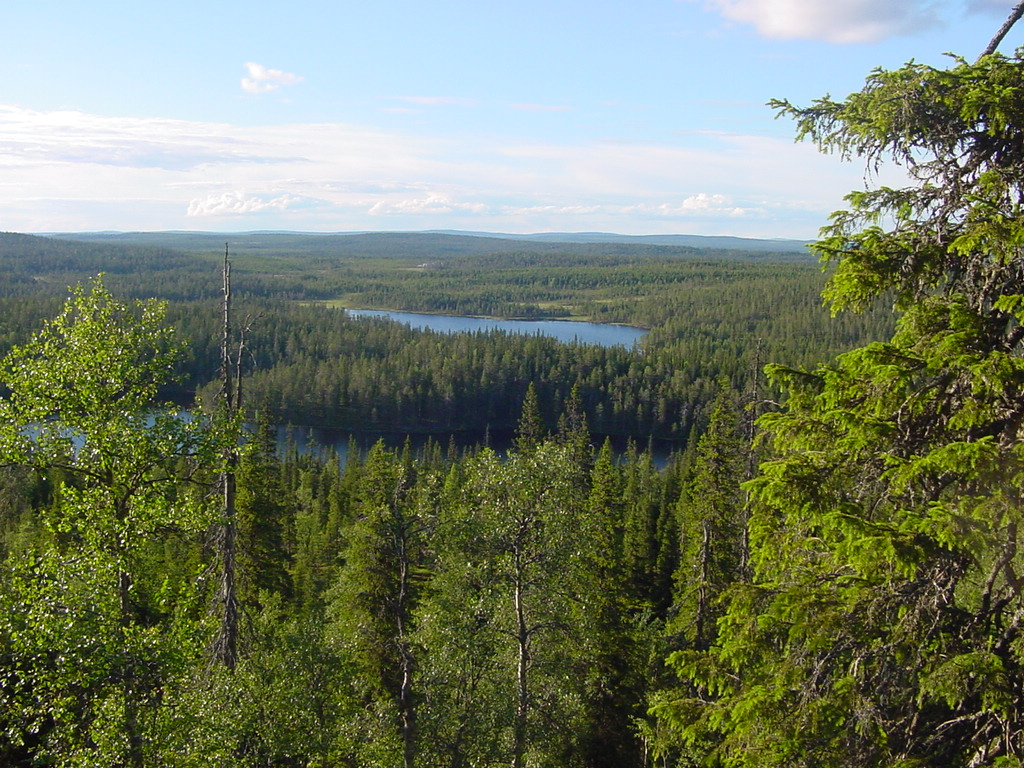
- View from top of Noukavaara

- Location within Finland
- Location: Lapland, Finland
- Coordinates: 66°14′N 028°30′E
- Area: 77 km^{2} (30 sq mi)
- Established: 1982; 44 years ago
- Visitors: 58,800 (in 2024)
- Governing body: Metsähallitus
- Website: https://www.luontoon.fi/en/destinations/riisitunturi-national-park

Riisitunturi National Park (Finnish: Riisitunturin kansallispuisto) is a national park in Posio, Finnish Lapland. It was established in 1982 and covers 77 square kilometres (30 sq mi). The park is in a mountainous area, and there are also many swamps, especially hillside swamps.

The only wilderness hut in the park is located near the twin-peak of Riisitunturi, 465.3 m (1,527 ft).

== See also ==
- List of national parks of Finland
- Protected areas of Finland
