= Lake Pielavesi =

Lake in Pielavesi, Finland

Pielavesi
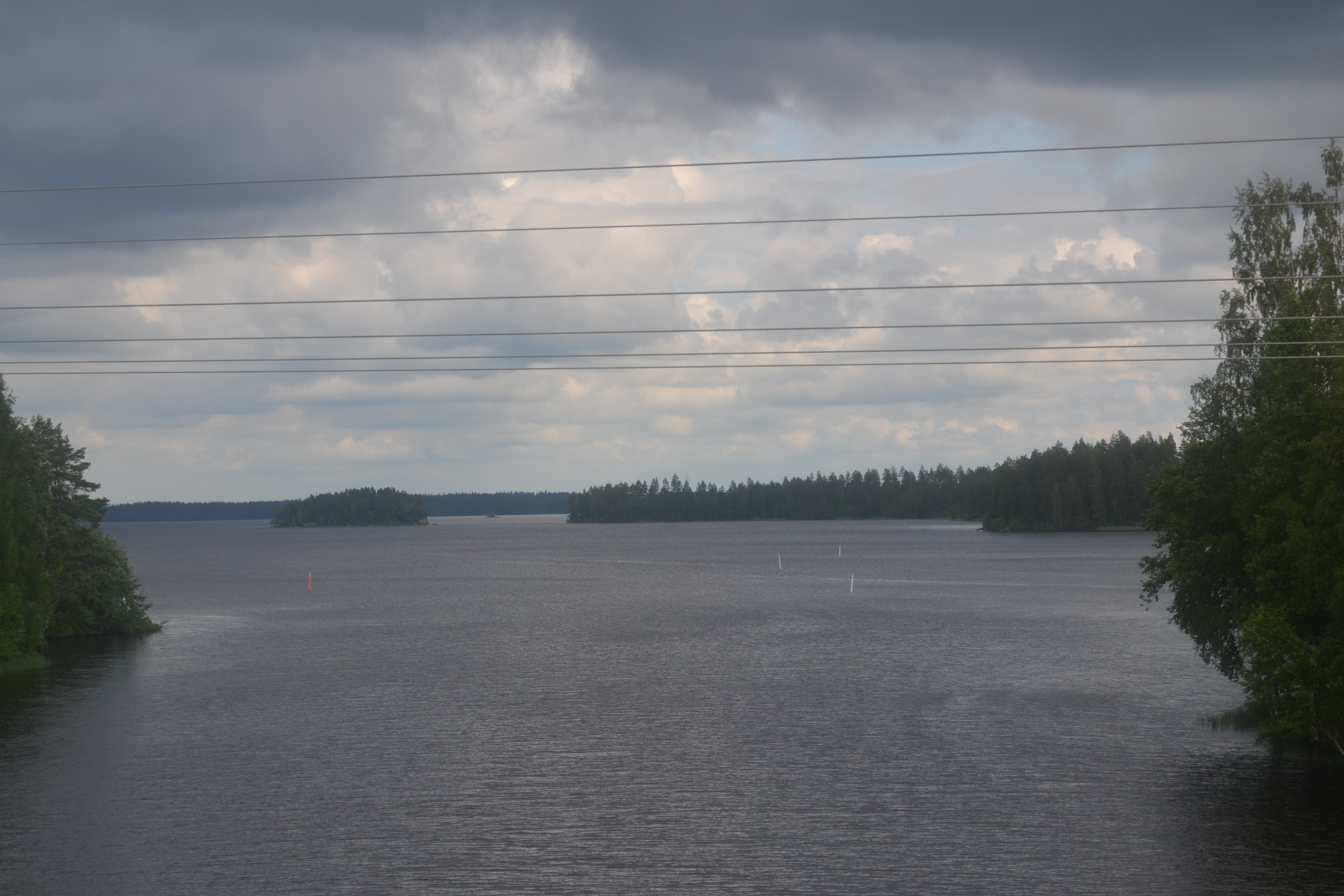

- Location within Finland
- Location: Northern Savonia
- Coordinates: 63°18′N 26°35′E
- Primary inflows: rivers Koivujoki and Lampaanjoki
- Primary outflows: Säviänvirta, to the lake Nilakka
- Catchment area: Kymijoki
- Basin countries: Finland
- Max. length: 4–7 km (2.5–4.3 mi)
- Max. width: 22 km (14 mi)
- Surface area: 110.098 km^{2} (42.509 sq mi)
- Max. depth: 29 m (95 ft)
- Shore length^{1}: 419.71 km (260.80 mi)
- Surface elevation: 102.3 m (336 ft)
- Islands: over 500 islands, biggest Kirkkosaari
- ^{1} Shore length is not a well-defined measure.

Pielavesi is a large lake in the Kymijoki main catchment area in Northern Savonia, Finland. With a surface area of 110.098 km^{2}, it is 29 meters deep at its deepest point. It is situated in the municipality of Pielavesi.
