= Kuyto =

Series of lakes in northwest Russia

Middle Kuyto
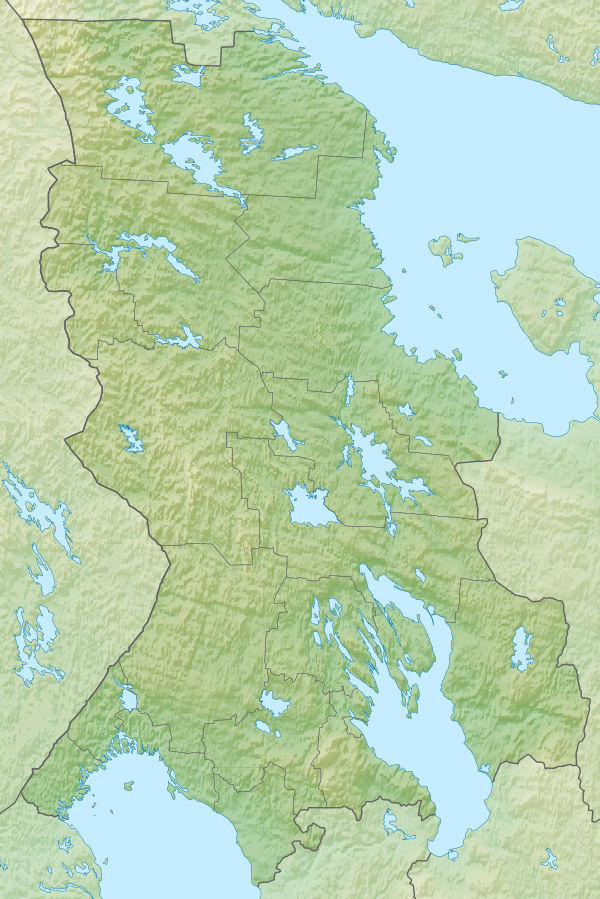
- Location within Karelia
- Location: Republic of Karelia
- Coordinates: 65°08′00″N 31°15′00″E
- Basin countries: Russia
- Surface area: 257 km^{2} (99 sq mi)
- Max. depth: 34 m (112 ft)
- Surface elevation: 101 m (331 ft)

The Kuyto (Russian: Куйто Finnish: Kuittijärvet) are three lakes in the Republic of Karelia, in the northwestern part of Russia. The Kuyto lakes are connected by natural canals, and are used for timber rafting.

- Upper Kuyto (Russian: Верхнее Куйто, Finnish: Ylä-Kuittijärvi) is located at 65.05°N 30.75°E. It has an area of 198 km^{2}, surface elevation of 103 m and a maximum depth of 44 m.
- Middle Kuyto (Russian: Среднее Куйто, Finnish: Keski-Kuittijärvi) is located at 65.1333333°N 31.25°E and has an area of 257 km^{2}, surface elevation of 101 m and a maximum depth of 34 m.
- Lower Kuyto (Russian: Нижнее Куйто, Finnish: Ala-Kuittijärvi) is located at 64.9333333°N 31.75°E and has an area of 141 km^{2}, surface elevation of 100 m and a maximum depth of 33 m. Lower Kuyto terminates at a dam built in 1956, below which flows the Kem River.

There are numerous islands on Kuyto Lakes.
