= Lake Kovdozero =

Lake in Murmansk Oblast, Russia

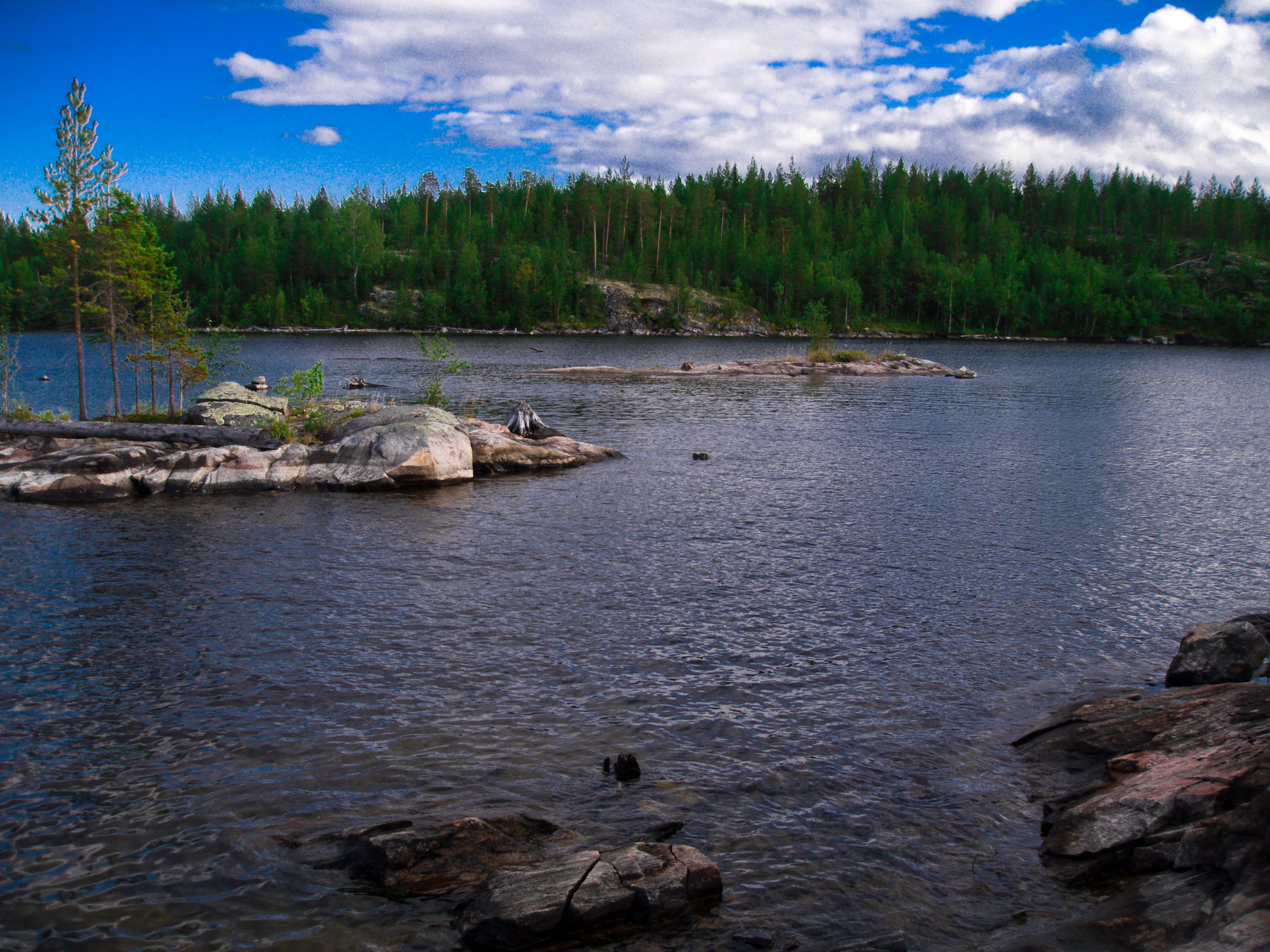

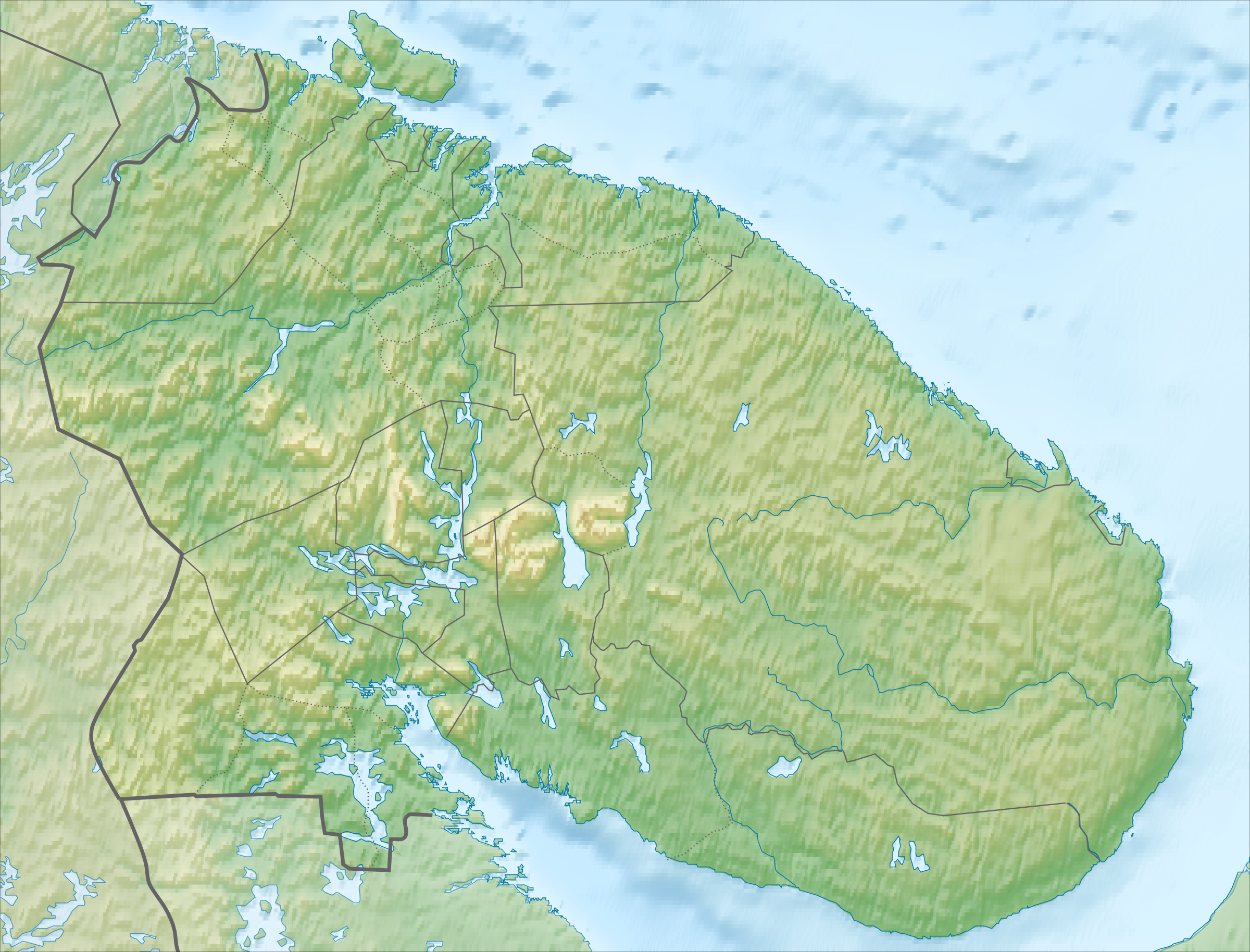
- Location within Murmansk Oblast Location within Russia
- Location: Murmansk Oblast
- Coordinates: 66°47′N 32°00′E
- Type: natural lake, reservoir
- Primary inflows: Kovda
- Primary outflows: Kovda
- Basin countries: Russia
- Max. length: 48 km (30 mi)
- Max. width: 23 km (14 mi)
- Surface area: 608 km^{2} (235 sq mi)
- Max. depth: 63 m (207 ft)
- Water volume: 3.7 km^{3} (3,000,000 acre⋅ft)
- Surface elevation: 37 m (121 ft)
- Islands: > 580

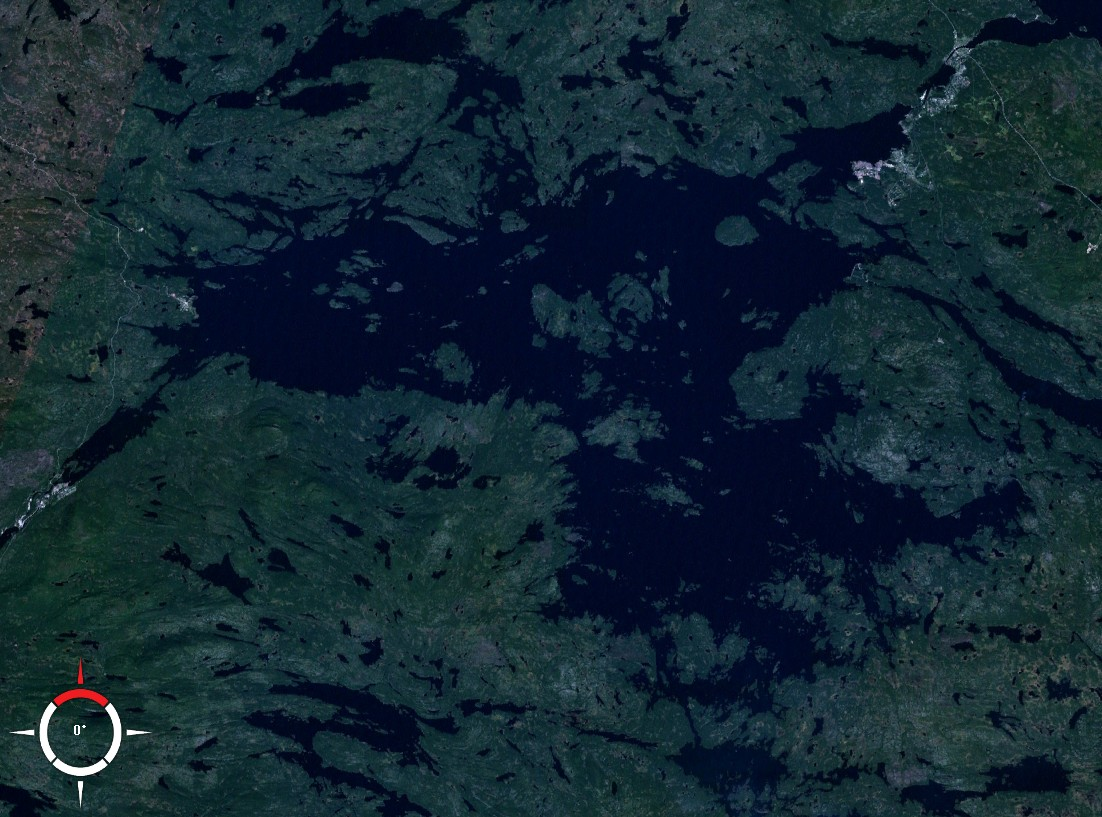

Lake Kovdozero (Russian: Ковдозеро) is a large freshwater lake in the southern Murmansk Oblast, northwestern part of Russia. There are many islands in the lake. The hydroelectric power plant was built in 1955, thus transforming the lake to the dam. The surface area of Kovdozero has risen from 224 to 294 km^{2} to 608 km^{2}. Many rivers empty into Kovdozero and it flows to the White Sea through the river Kovda. There are also 580 islands located throughout Kovodozero, each varying in size and topography. The lake is used to fishery, water transport and timber rafting.
