= Iisvesi =

Lake in Finland

- Location within Finland
- Location: Northern Savonia
- Coordinates: 62°46′N 26°52′E
- Basin countries: Finland
- Surface area: 164.47 km^{2} (63.50 sq mi)
- Max. depth: 34.47 m (113.1 ft)
- Shore length^{1}: 464.22 km (288.45 mi)
- Surface elevation: 97.9 m (321 ft)
- ^{1} Shore length is not a well-defined measure.

Iisvesi is a rather large lake in Finland. The lake consists of three separate basins: Iisvesi, Virmasvesi and Rasvanki. Located within Tervo, Rautalampi, Suonenjoki and northern Kuopio in a sparsely populated area, its waters are generally pretty clear.
