= Lake Engozero =

Lake in Loukhsky District, Karelia, Russia

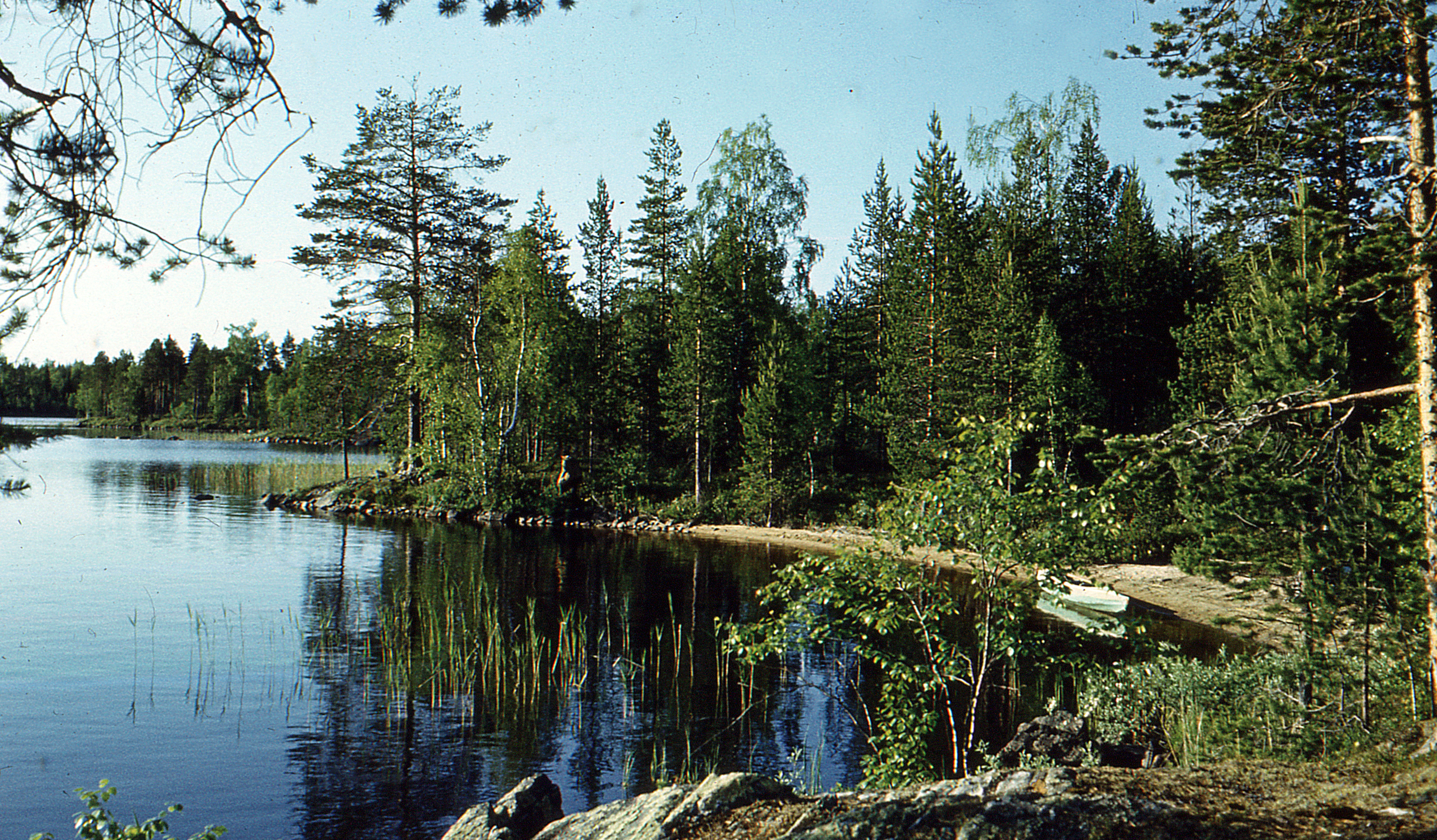
- Lake Engozero in 1985

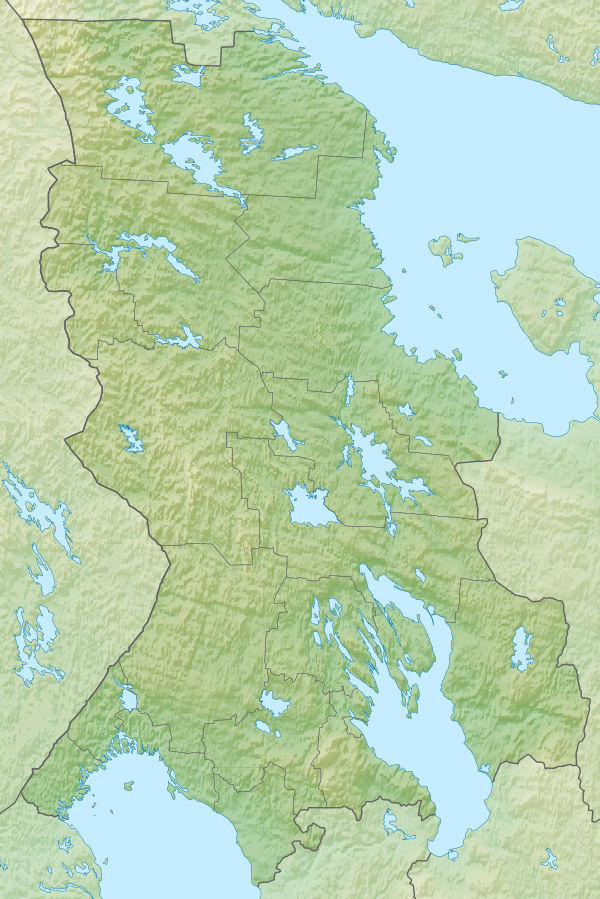
- Location within Karelia
- Location: Republic of Karelia
- Coordinates: 65.766667°N 33.53333°E
- Basin countries: Russia
- Max. length: 36.4 km (22.6 mi)
- Max. width: 7.9 km (4.9 mi)
- Surface area: 122 km^{2} (47 sq mi)
- Max. depth: 18 m (59 ft)
- Islands: 144

Lake Engozero (Russian: Энгозеро, Finnish: Enkijärvi) is a large freshwater lake in the Republic of Karelia, Russia. It has an area of 122 km^{2} (without islands), length of 36.4 km, width of 7.9 km and a maximum depth of 18 m. There are 144 islands with total area of 14 km^{2} on the lake.
