= Kem (river) =

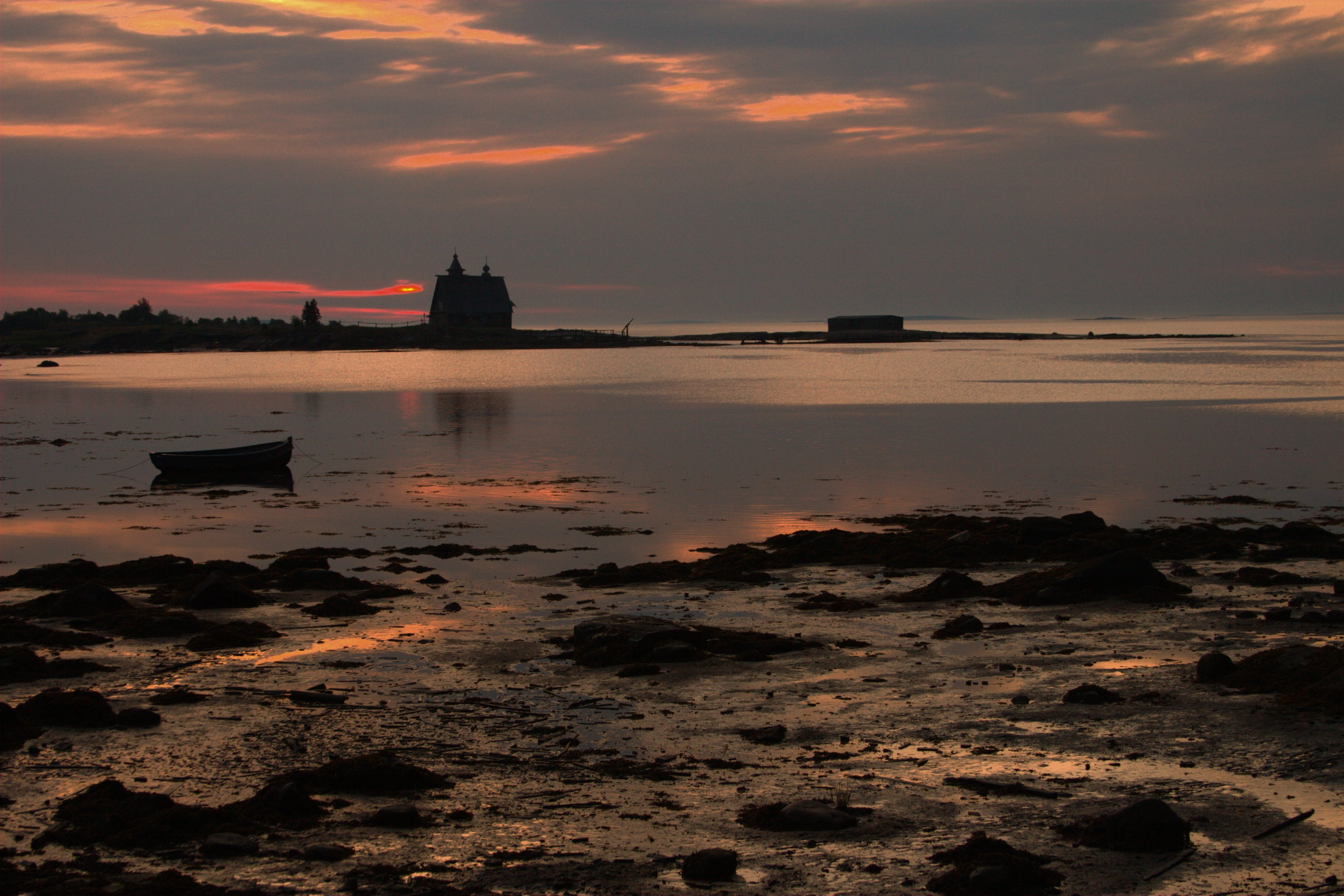

Location
- Country: Russia

Physical characteristics
- Source
  - location: Lake Lower Kuyto
  - elevation: 100 m (330 ft)
- Mouth: White Sea
  - coordinates: 64.9508°N 34.6746°E
- Length: 191 km (119 mi)
- Basin size: 27,700 km^{2} (10,700 sq mi)
- Discharge
  - average: 275 m^{3}/s (9,700 cu ft/s)

The Kem (Russian: Кемь, Finnish: Kemijoki) is a river in Republic of Karelia, Russia. It starts from the Lower Kuyto lake and flows through a number of lakes into the White Sea. It is 191 kilometres (119 mi) long, and has a drainage basin of 27,700 square kilometres (10,700 sq mi). There is a cascade of five hydroelectric power plants on the river, and the town of Kem is located at its mouth. Tributaries of the Kem include the Chirko-Kem, Okhta, Kepa and Shomba.

== See also ==
- Kem (Yenisei)
