= Posio =

Municipality in Lapland, Finland

- Municipality
- Posion kunta
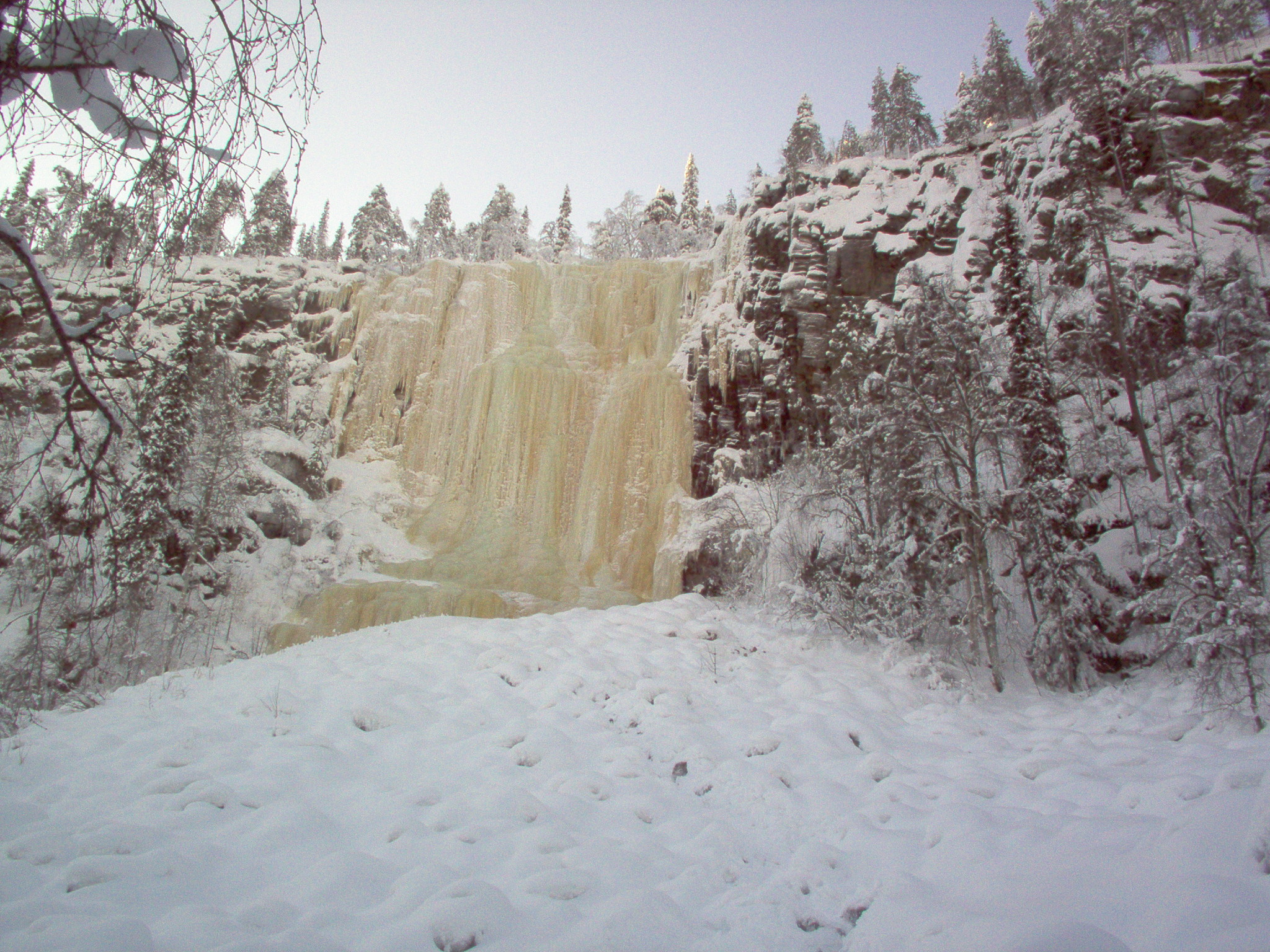
- Ice wall at Korouoma

- Coat of arms

- Location of Posio in Finland
- OpenStreetMap Interactive map outlining Posio.
- Interactive map of Posio
- Coordinates: 66°06.5′N 028°10′E
- Country: Finland
- Region: Lapland
- Sub-region: Eastern Lapland
- Charter: 1926
- Seat: Ahola

Government
  - Municipal manager: Heli Knutars

Area (2018-01-01)
  - Total: 3,544.90 km^{2} (1,368.69 sq mi)
  - Land: 3,039.68 km^{2} (1,173.63 sq mi)
  - Water: 506.14 km^{2} (195.42 sq mi)
  - Rank: 16th largest in Finland

Population (2025-12-31)
  - Total: 2,826
  - Rank: 219th largest in Finland
  - Density: 0.93/km^{2} (2.4/sq mi)

Population by native language
  - Finnish: 97.5% (official)
  - Others: 2.5%

Population by age
  - 0 to 14: 8.3%
  - 15 to 64: 50.5%
  - 65 or older: 41.2%
- Time zone: UTC+02:00 (EET)
  - Summer (DST): UTC+03:00 (EEST)
- Postal code: 97900
- Website: www.posio.fi/en/

Posio is a municipality of Finland. It is located in the region of Lapland. The municipality has a population of 2,826 (31 December 2025) and covers an area of 3,544.90 square kilometres (1,368.69 sq mi) of which 506.14 km^{2} (195.42 sq mi) is water. The population density is 0.93 inhabitants per square kilometre (2.4/sq mi). Neighbour municipalities are Rovaniemi, Kemijärvi, Ranua, Salla, Kuusamo, Taivalkoski and Pudasjärvi.

The municipality is Finnish-speaking.

== History ==
The Senate decided to establish a parish at Posio in 1908, but the plan was delayed, in part for want of a church. Posio was finally constituted as a separate parish and municipality at the turn of 1925 and 1926, formed mainly from parts of Kuusamo, with smaller areas taken from Taivalkoski, Pudasjärvi and the rural parish of Rovaniemi. A leading figure in the campaign for the municipality's independence was the farmer Juho Aapo Miekkasaari (1862–1942).

== Geography ==
Posio lies in southern Lapland, between Kuusamo and Rovaniemi. Lakes make up a large part of its area, among them Kitkajärvi, Livojärvi and Suolijärvi. Riisitunturi National Park, known for the hanging bogs on its fells, and the Korouoma canyon and nature reserve lie within the municipality, which also takes in part of Syöte National Park. The European route E63 crosses the north-eastern part of the municipality. About 8 kilometres (5.0 mi) north of the village centre is a micronation called Valtio, founded by Ari "Paska" Peltonen in 2006.

== Economy ==
The largest employers are the municipality itself, the ceramics manufacturer Pentik and agriculture, especially dairy farming. Tourism is also important to the local economy. Posio was the first municipality in Finland to be awarded the Sustainable Travel Finland label, and it belongs to the HINKU network of municipalities committed to carbon neutrality.

== Sights and events ==
Posio's most renowned attractions are the Pentik-mäki Culture Centre, Riisitunturi National Park, Korouoma Nature Reserve, and the clear waters of lakes Kitkajärvi and Livojärvi. There are also many outdoor recreational activities in the area.

The world's northernmost ceramics factory is located in Posio. Pentik Oy interior design company was established in 1971 by Anu and Topi Pentikäinen.

Regular events in Posio are the Posio Fair, the amateur theatre event Teatterihelinät, and the Traditional Fish Fair Market (Muikkumarkkinat) in July.

== Notable people ==
- Kaarlo Maaninka (born 1953), Finnish long distance runner
- Soile Isokoski (born 1957), Finnish lyric soprano
- Sini Karjalainen (born 1999), Finnish hockey player
