= Kovda =

Kovda Kuma, Iova
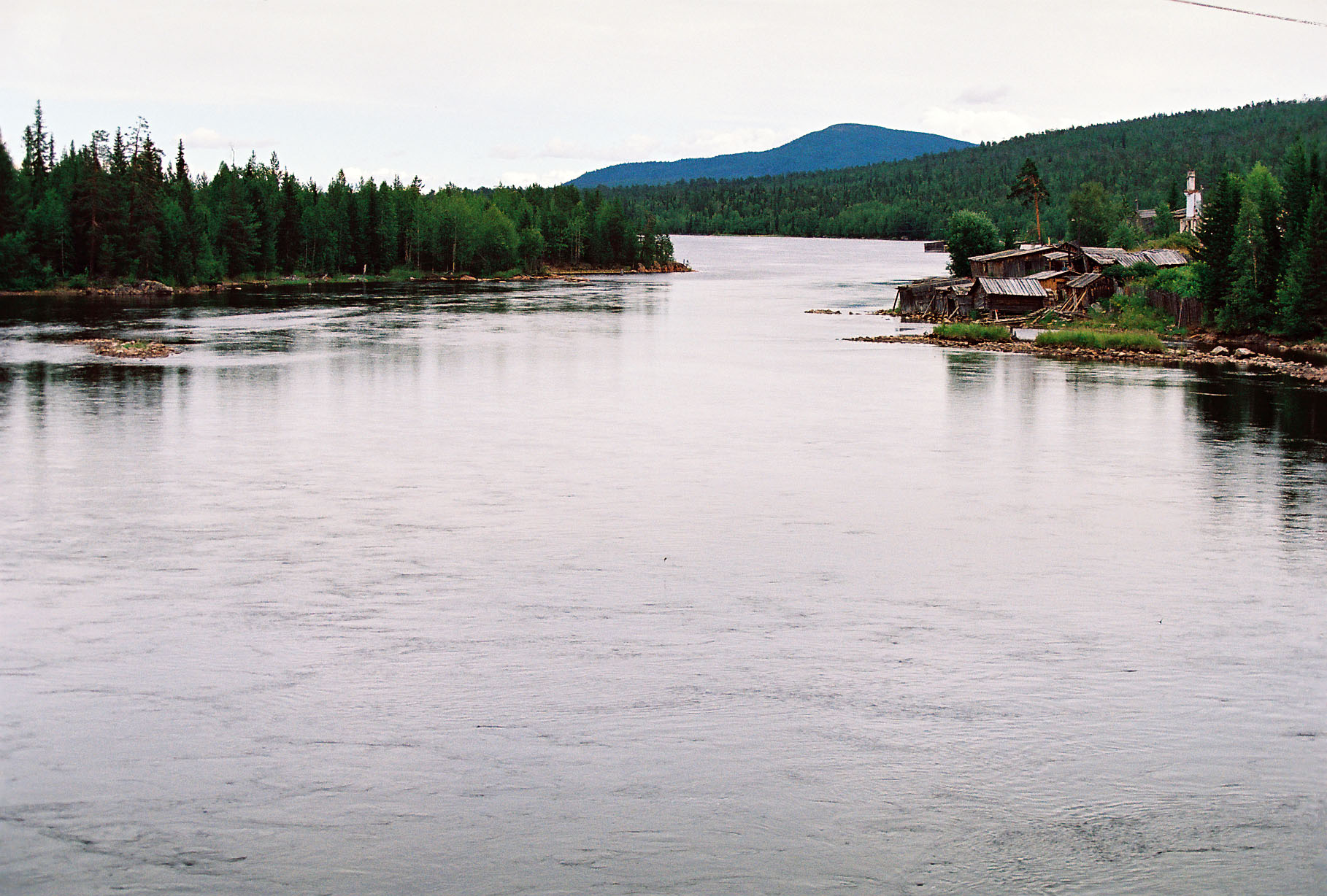
- Iova
- Native name: Ковда (Russian); Koutajoki (Finnish)

Location
- Country: Russia
- Region: Murmansk Oblast, Republic of Karelia

Physical characteristics
- Source
  - location: Lake Topozero
- Mouth
  - location: Kandalaksha Gulf
  - coordinates: 66.6908°N 32.8694°E
- Length: 233 km (145 mi)
- Basin size: 26,100 km^{2} (10,100 sq mi)

The Kovda (Russian: Ковда, Finnish: Koutajoki) is a river in the south of the Kola Peninsula in Murmansk Oblast and Republic of Karelia, Russia. It is 233 kilometres (145 mi) long, with a drainage basin of 26,100 square kilometres (10,100 mi^{2}). The Kovda originates in the Lake Topozero and flows through the lakes Lake Pyaozero and Lake Kovdozero into the Kandalaksha Gulf.

The drainage basin of the Kovda includes the biggest lakes of the north of the Republic of Karelia and the south of Murmansk Oblast, such as Lake Topozero, Lake Pyaozero, Lake Tikshozero, and Lake Kovdozero.
