= Geography of Finland =

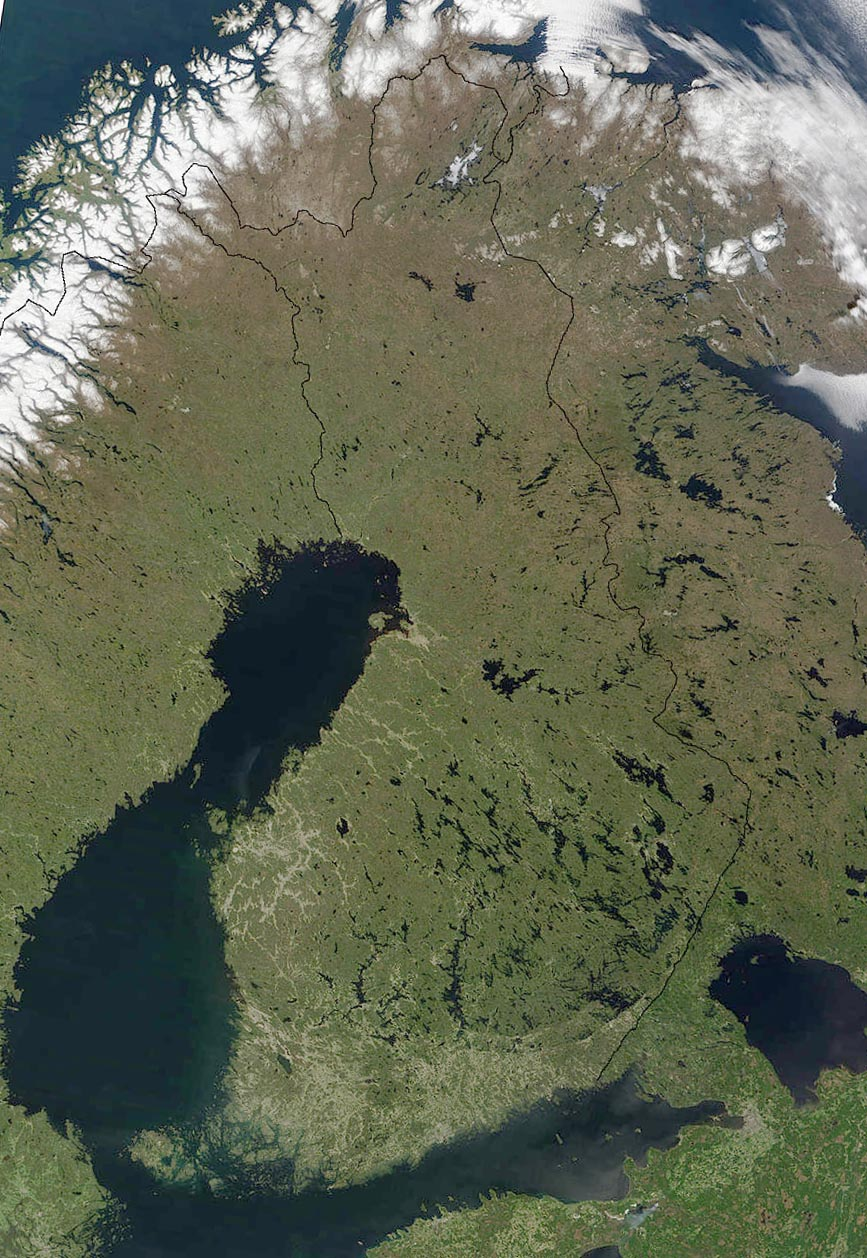
- Continent: Europe
- Region: Northern Europe
- Coordinates: 60°10′N 24°56′E
- Area
  - Total: 338,424 km^{2} (130,666 sq mi)
  - Land: 89.85%
  - Water: 10.15%
- Coastline: 31,119 km (19,336 mi)
- Borders: Total land borders: 2,563 km (1,593 mi)
- Highest point: Haltitunturi; 1,328 m (4,357 ft)
- Lowest point: Baltic Sea; 0 meters
- Longest river: Kemijoki River; 550 km (340 mi)
- Largest lake: Saimaa; 4,400 km^{2} (1,700 sq mi)
- Exclusive economic zone: 87,171 km^{2} (33,657 sq mi)

The geography of Finland is characterized by its northern position, its ubiquitous landscapes of intermingled boreal forests and lakes, and its low population density. Finland can be divided into three areas: archipelagoes and coastal lowlands, a slightly higher central lake plateau and uplands to north and northeast. Bordering the Baltic Sea, Gulf of Bothnia, and Gulf of Finland, as well as Sweden to the west, Norway (one of Finland's non-EU neighbours) to the north, and Russia (another non-EU neighbour) to the east, Finland is the northernmost country in the European Union. Most of the population and agricultural resources are concentrated in the south. Northern and eastern Finland are sparsely populated containing vast wilderness areas. Taiga forest is the dominant vegetation type.

== Size and external boundaries ==
Map of Finland – click to enlarge.

Finland's total area is 337,030 km^{2} (130,128 sq mi). Of this area 10% is water, 69% forest, 8% cultivated land and 13% other. Finland is the eighth largest country in Europe after Russia, Ukraine, France, Spain, Sweden, Norway and Germany.

As a whole, the shape of Finland's boundaries resembles a figure of a one-armed human. In Finnish, parallels are drawn between the figure and the national personification of Finland – Finnish Maiden (Suomi-neito) – and the country as a whole can be referred in the Finnish language by her name. Even in official context the area around Enontekiö in northwestern part of the country between Sweden and Norway can be referred to as the "Arm" (käsivarsi). After the Continuation War Finland lost major land areas to the Soviet Union in the Moscow Armistice of 1944, and the figure was said to have lost the other of her arms, as well as a hem of her "skirt".

== Relief and geology ==
=== Geology ===
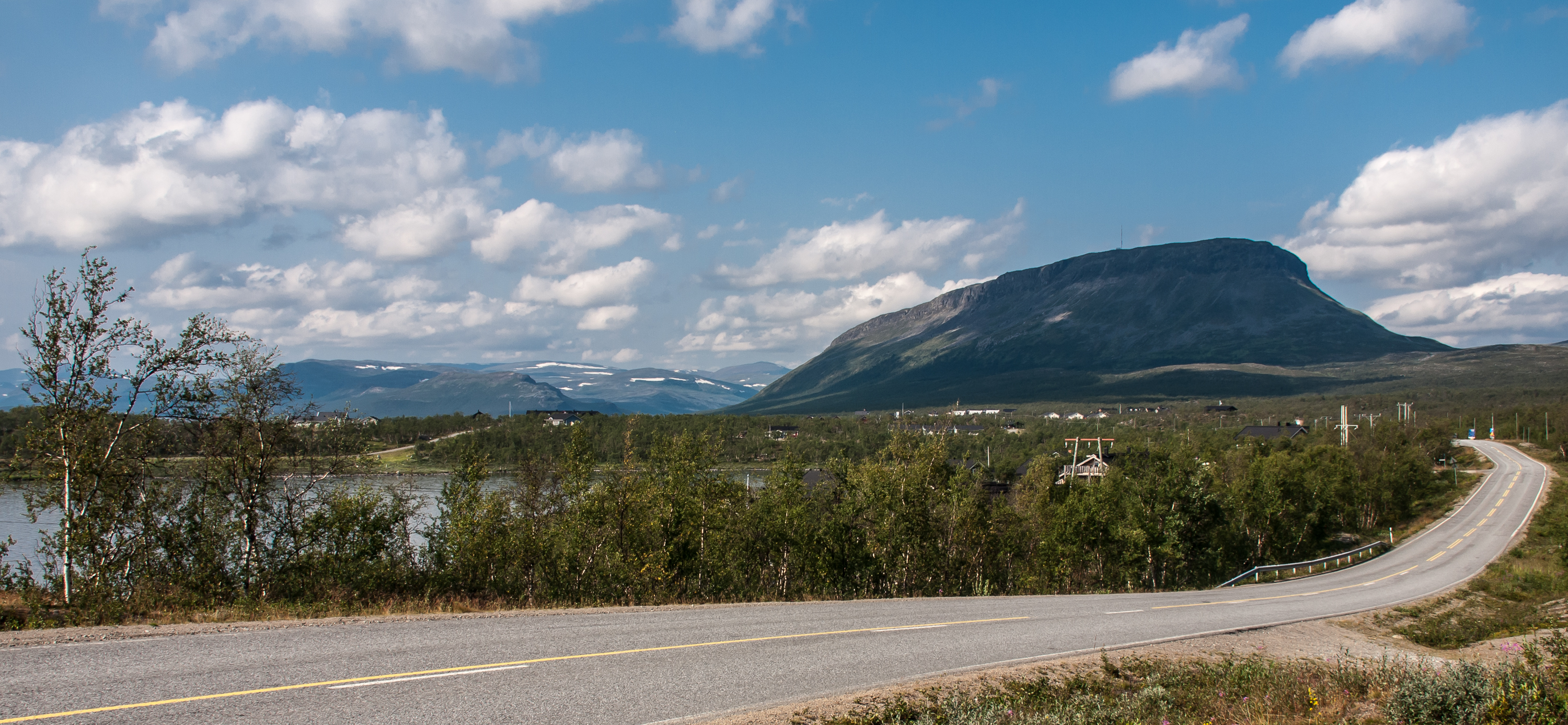
The view of Saana mountain in Kilpisjärvi, Finland.

The bedrock of Finland belong to the Baltic Shield and was formed by a succession of orogenies in Precambrian time. The oldest rocks of Finland, those of Archean age, are found in the east and north. These rocks are chiefly granitoids and migmatitic gneiss. Rocks in central and western Finland originated or came to place during the Svecokarelian orogeny. Following this last orogeny Rapakivi granites intruded various locations of Finland during the Mesoproterozoic and Neoproterozoic, specially at Åland and the southeast. So-called Jotnian sediments occur usually together with Rapakivi granites. The youngest rocks in Finland are those found in the northwestern arm which belong to Scandinavian Caledonides that assembled in Paleozoic times. During the Caledonian orogeny Finland was likely a sunken foreland basin covered by sediments, subsequent uplift and erosion would have eroded all of these sediments.

=== Relief and hydrography ===
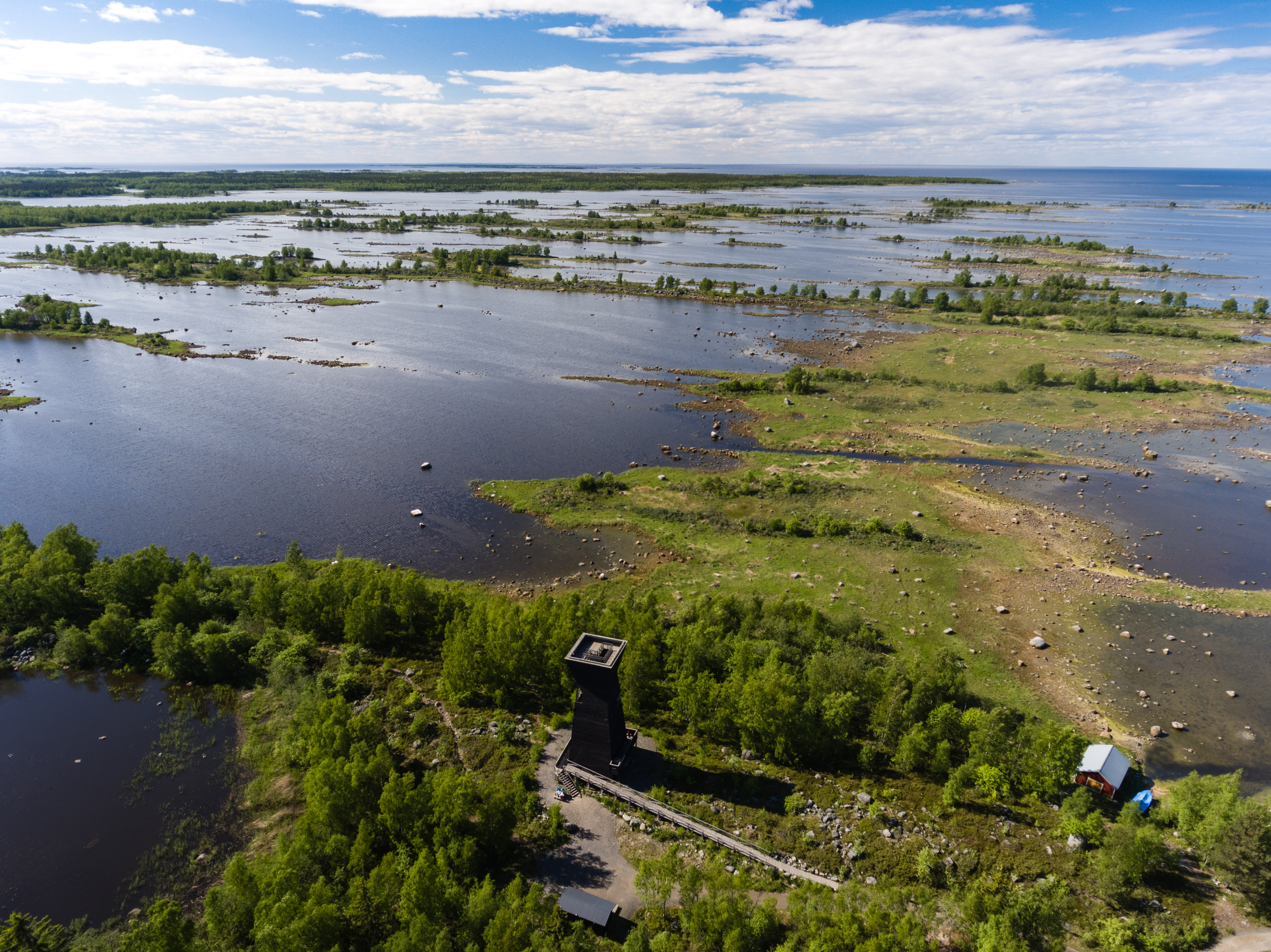
An aerial view of the Kvarken Archipelago

About one third of Finland lies below 100 m, and about two thirds lies under 200 m. Finland can be divided into three topographical areas; the coastal landscapes, the interior lake plateau also known as Finnish lake district and Upland Finland. The coastal landscapes are made up mostly of plains below 20 m. These plains tilt gently towards the sea so that where its irregularities surpasses sea-level groups of islands like the Kvarken Archipelago or the Åland Islands are found. Åland is connected to the Finnish mainland by a shallow submarine plateau that does not exceed 20 m in depth. Next to the Gulf of Bothnia the landscape of Finland is extremely flat with height differences no larger than 50 m. This region called the Ostrobothnian Plain extends inland about 100 km and constitute the largest plain in the Nordic countries.

The interior lake plateau is dominated by undulating hilly terrain with valley to top height differences of 100 or less and occasionally up to 200 m. Only the area around the lakes Pielinen and Päijänne stand with a subtly more pronounced relief. The relief of the interior lake plateau bears some resemblance to the Swedish Norrland terrain. Upland Finland and areas higher than 200 m are found mostly in the north and east of the country where hills and mountains exceed 500 m in height in these regions. Inselberg plains are common in the northern half of the country. In the northern region more known as Lapland, highest points reach mostly from 200 m to 600 m and the landscape is a förfjäll (fore-fell). However the most northern parts represent a more dramatic mountain landscape where the Halti fell represents a highest point (1361 m) in the country.

The subdued landscape of Finland is the result of protracted erosion that has leveled down ancient mountain massifs into near-flat landforms called peneplains. The last major leveling event resulted in the formation of the Sub-Cambrian peneplain in Late Neoproterozoic time. While Finland has remained very close to sea-level since the formation of this last peneplain some further relief was formed by a slight uplift resulting in the carving of valleys by rivers. The slight uplift also means that at parts the uplifted peneplain can be traced as summit accordances. The Quaternary ice ages resulted in the erosion of weak rock and loose materials by glaciers. When the ice masses retreated eroded depressions turned into lakes. (Note: Compare to southern Sweden where its large number of lakes would according to Alfred Gabriel Nathorst be indebted to the creation of basins due to the stripping of an irregular mantle of weathered rock by glacier erosion.) Fractures in Finland's bedrock were particularly affected by weathering and erosion, leaving as result trace straight sea and lake inlets.

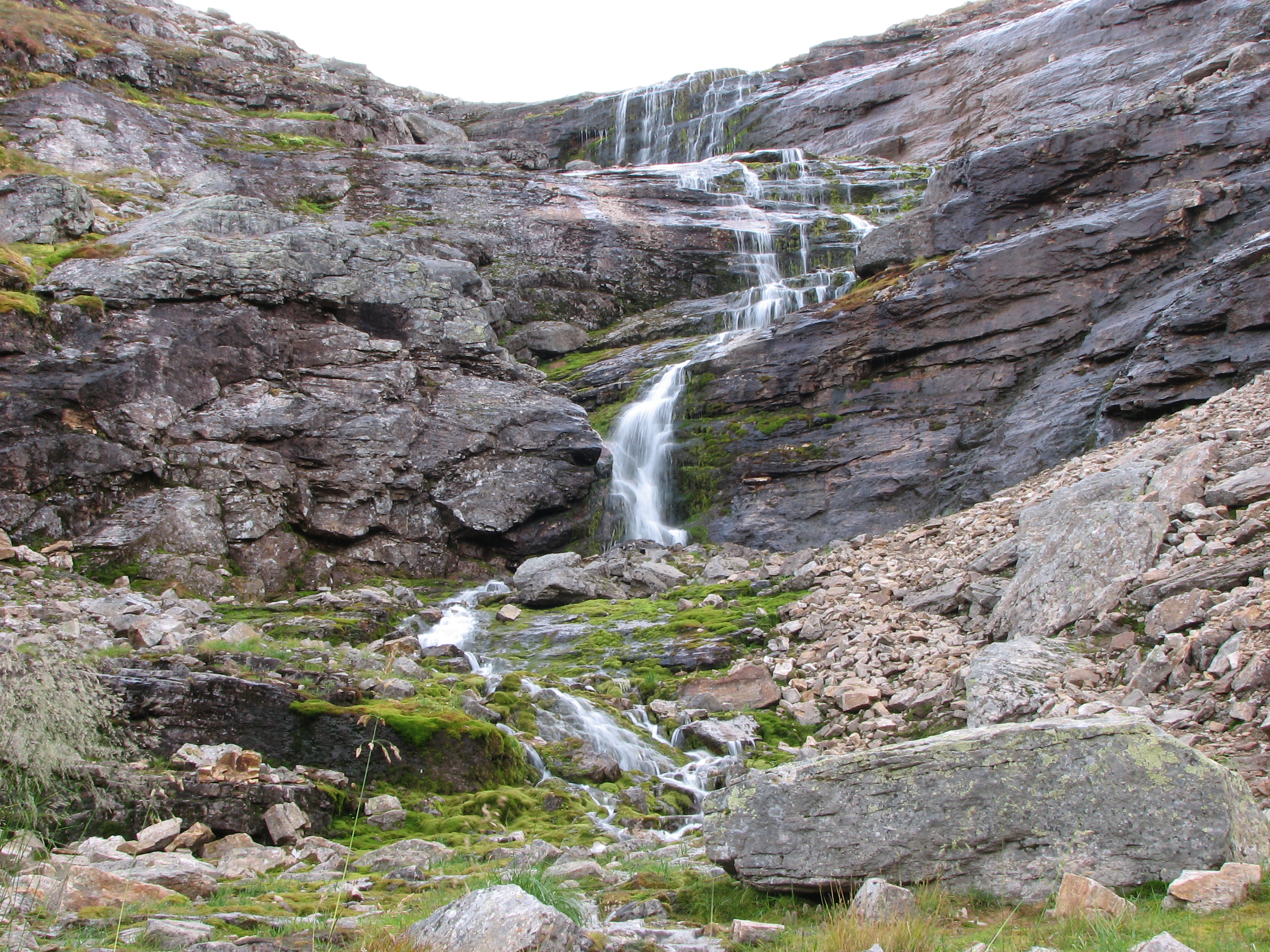
Paratiisikuru waterfall in Urho Kekkonen National Park, Sodankylä, Finland.

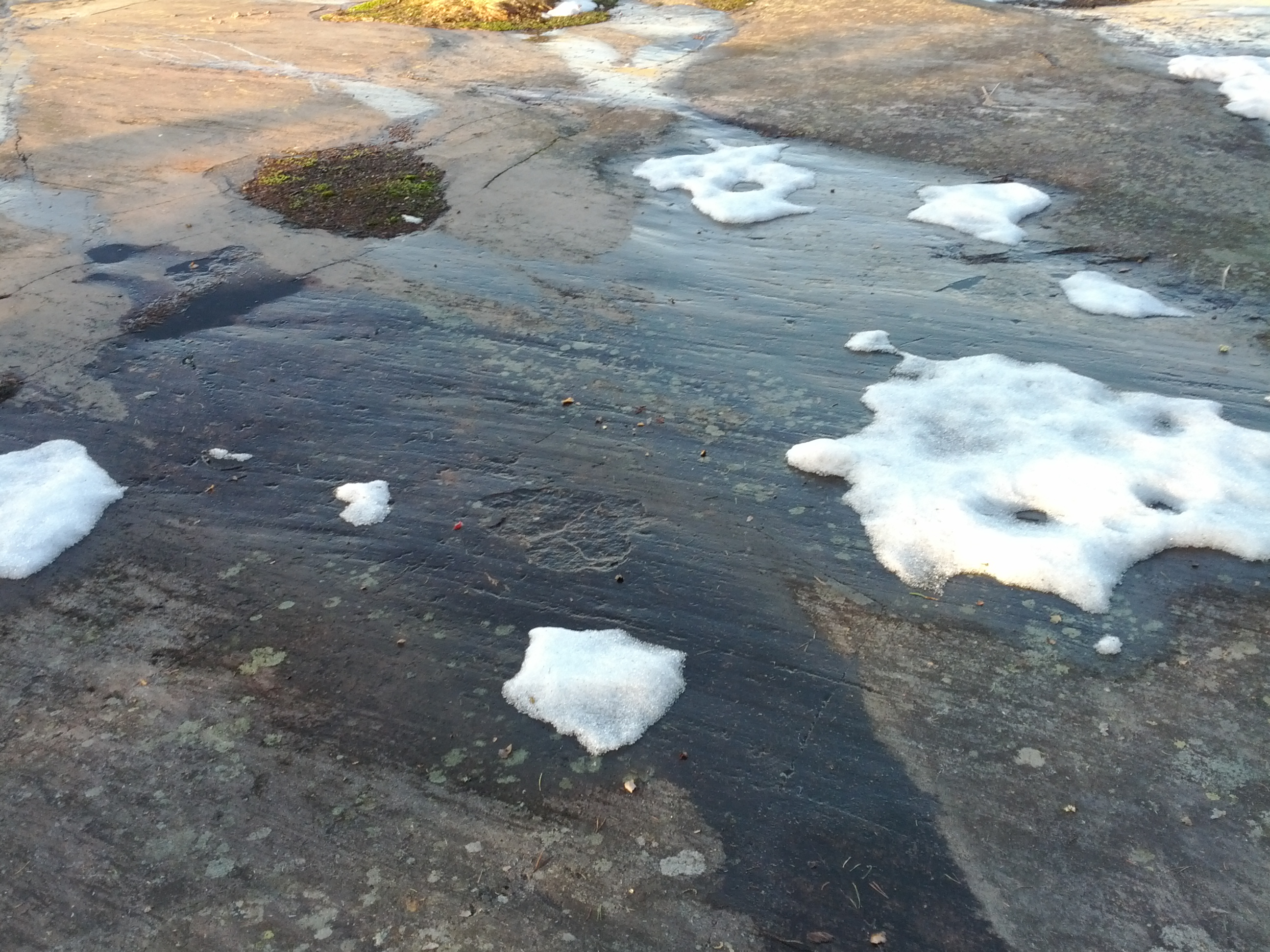
Effects of the last ice age: glacial striations in a country without glaciers

Except a few rivers along the coasts most rivers in Finland drain at some stage into one or more lakes. The drainage basins drain into various directions. Much of Finland drains into the Gulf of Bothnia including the country's largest and longest rivers, Kokemäenjoki and Kemijoki respectively. Finland's largest lake drains by Vuoksi River into Lake Ladoga in Russia. Upland Finland in the east drains east across Russian Republic of Karelia into the White Sea. In the northeast Lake Inari discharges by Paatsjoki into Barents Sea in the Arctic.

Localities in Finland by approximate date of deglaciation
Year before present	Deglaciated
12,700	Helsinki, Kotka
11,000	Turku, Kuopio
10,900	Jyväskylä, Mariehamn, Tampere
10,800	Lake Inari
10,700	All of Åland
10,500	Kajaani
10,300	Vasa, Oulu
10,200	Rovaniemi
10,100	Tornio

=== Quaternary glaciation ===
The ice sheet that covered Finland intermittently during the Quaternary grew out from the Scandinavian Mountains. During the last deglaciation the first parts of Finland to become ice-free, the southeastern coast, did so slightly prior to the Younger Dryas cold-spell 12,700 years before present (BP). The retreat of the ice cover occurred simultaneously from the north-east, the east and southeast. The retreat was fastest from the southeast resulting in the lower course of Tornio being the last part of Finland to be deglaciated. Finally by 10,100 years BP the ice cover had all but left Finland to concentrate in Sweden and Norway before fading away.

As the ice sheet became thinner and retreated the land begun to rise by effect of isostacy. Much of Finland was under water when the ice retreated and was gradually uplifted in a process that continues today. (Note: If current rates of uplift continue Sweden and Finland will have a land boundary across the Gulf of Bothnia at Kvarken in about 2,000 years.) Albeit not all areas were drowned at the same time it is estimated at time or another about 62% has been under water. Depending on location in Finland the ancient shoreline reached different maximum heights. In southern Finland 150 to 160 m, in central Finland about 200 m and in eastern Finland up to 220 m.

== Climate ==
Finland map of Köppen climate classification

Latitude is the principal influence on Finland's climate. Because of Finland's northern location, winter is the longest season. Only in the south coast is summer as long as winter. On the average, winter lasts from early December to mid March in the archipelago and the southwestern coast and from early October to early May in Lapland. This means that southern portions of the country are snow-covered about three months of the year and the northern, about seven months. The long winter causes about half of the annual 500 to 600 millimetres (19.7 to 23.6 in) of precipitation in the north to fall as snow. Precipitation in the south amounts to about 600 to 700 millimetres (23.6 to 27.6 in) annually. Like that of the north, it occurs all through the year, though not so much of it is snow.

The Atlantic Ocean to the west and the Eurasian continent to the east interact to modify the climate of the country. The warm waters of the Gulf Stream and the North Atlantic Drift Current, which warm Norway and Sweden, also warm Finland. Westerly winds bring the warm air currents into the Baltic areas and to the country's shores, moderating winter temperatures, especially in the south. These winds, because of clouds associated with weather systems accompanying the westerlies, also decrease the amount of sunshine received during the summer. By contrast, the continental high pressure system situated over the Eurasian continent counteracts the maritime influences, occasionally causing severe winters and high temperatures in the summer.

The highest ever recorded temperature is 37.2 °C (99.0 °F) (Liperi, 29 July 2010). The lowest, −51.5 °C (−60.7 °F) (Kittilä, 28 January 1999). The annual middle temperature is relatively high in the southwestern part of the country (5.0 to 7.5 °C or 41.0 to 45.5 °F), with quite mild winters and warm summers, and low in the northeastern part of Lapland (0 to −4 °C or 32 to 25 °F).

Temperature extremes for every month:

Climate data for Finland
Month	Jan	Feb	Mar	Apr	May	Jun	Jul	Aug	Sep	Oct	Nov	Dec	Year
Record high °C (°F)	10.9 (51.6)	11.8 (53.2)	17.5 (63.5)	25.5 (77.9)	31.0 (87.8)	33.8 (92.8)	37.2 (99.0)	33.8 (92.8)	28.8 (83.8)	21.1 (70.0)	16.6 (61.9)	11.3 (52.3)	37.2 (99.0)
Record low °C (°F)	−51.5 (−60.7)	−49.0 (−56.2)	−44.3 (−47.7)	−36.0 (−32.8)	−24.6 (−12.3)	−7.0 (19.4)	−5.0 (23.0)	−10.8 (12.6)	−18.7 (−1.7)	−31.8 (−25.2)	−42.0 (−43.6)	−47.0 (−52.6)	−51.5 (−60.7)
Source: https://ilmatieteenlaitos.fi/lampotilaennatyksia

Extreme highs:

- January: +10.9 °C (51.6 °F) (January 6, 1973, Mariehamn Airport, Jomala, Åland)
- February: +11.8 °C (53.2 °F) (February 28, 1943, Ilmala, Helsinki, Uusimaa)
- March: +17.5 °C (63.5 °F) (March 27, 2007, Helsinki Airport, Vantaa, Uusimaa)
- April: +25.5 °C (77.9 °F) (April 27, 1921, Jyväskylä, Central Finland)
- May: +31.0 °C (87.8 °F) (May 30/31, 1995, Ingermaninkylä, Lapinjärvi, Uusimaa)
- June: +33.8 °C (92.8 °F) (June 24, 1934, Ähtäri, South Ostrobothnia)
- July: +37.2 °C (99.0 °F) (July 29, 2010, Joensuu Airport, Liperi, North Karelia)
- August: +33.8 °C (92.8 °F) (August 7, 2010, Heinola, Päijät-Häme, and Puumala, South Savo and August 8, 2010, Laune, Lahti, Päijät-Häme)
- September: +28.8 °C (83.8 °F) (September 6, 1968, Rauma, Satakunta)
- October: +21.1 °C (70.0 °F) (October 14, 2018, Oulu Airport, Oulu, North Ostrobothnia)
- November: +16.6 °C (61.9 °F) (November 6, 2020, Mariehamn Airport, Jomala, Åland)
- December: +11.3 °C (52.3 °F) (December 20, 2015, Kokemäki, Satakunta and Pori, Satakunta)

Extreme lows:

- January: −51.5 °C (−60.7 °F) (January 28, 1999, Pokka, Kittilä, Lapland)
- February: −49.0 °C (−56.2 °F) (February 5, 1912, Sodankylä, Lapland)
- March: −44.3 °C (−47.7 °F) (March 1, 1971, Tuntsa, Salla, Lapland)
- April: −36.0 °C (−32.8 °F) (April 2, 1912, Kuusamo, North Ostrobothnia and April 9, 1912, Sodankylä, Lapland)
- May: −24.6 °C (−12.3 °F) (May 1, 1971, Kalmankaltio, Enontekiö, Lapland)
- June: −7.0 °C (19.4 °F) (June 3, 1962, Laanila, Inari, Lapland)
- July: −5.0 °C (23.0 °F) (July 12, 1958, Kilpisjärvi, Enontekiö, Lapland)
- August: −10.8 °C (12.6 °F) (August 26, 1980, Naruska, Salla, Lapland)
- September: −18.7 °C (−1.7 °F) (September 26, 1968, Vuotso, Sodankylä, Lapland)
- October: −31.8 °C (−25.2 °F) (October 25, 1968, Sodankylä, Lapland)
- November: −42.0 °C (−43.6 °F) (November 30, 1915, Sodankylä, Lapland)
- December: −47.0 °C (−52.6 °F) (December 21, 1919, Pielisjärvi, North Karelia)

== Area and boundaries ==
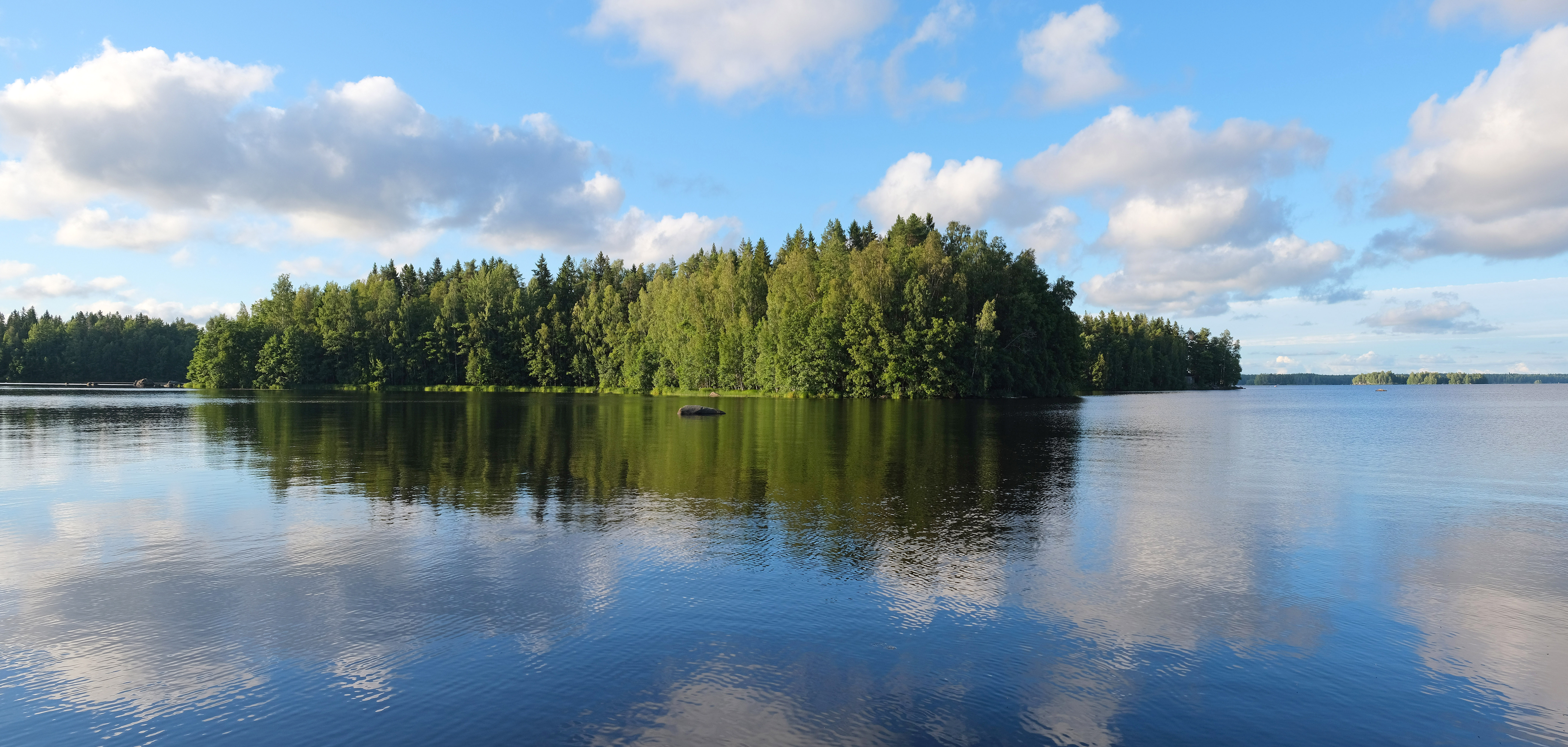
There are some 187,888 lakes in Finland larger than 500 square metres and 75,818 islands of over 0,5 km2 area.

Area:
total: 338,145 km^{2} (130,559 sq mi)
land: 303,815 km^{2} (117,304 sq mi)
water: 34,330 km^{2} (13,250 sq mi)

Area – comparative: slightly smaller than Germany, Montana, and Newfoundland and Labrador

Land boundaries:
total: 2,563 km (1,593 mi)
border countries: Norway 709 km (441 mi), Sweden 545 km (339 mi), Russia 1,309 km (813 mi)

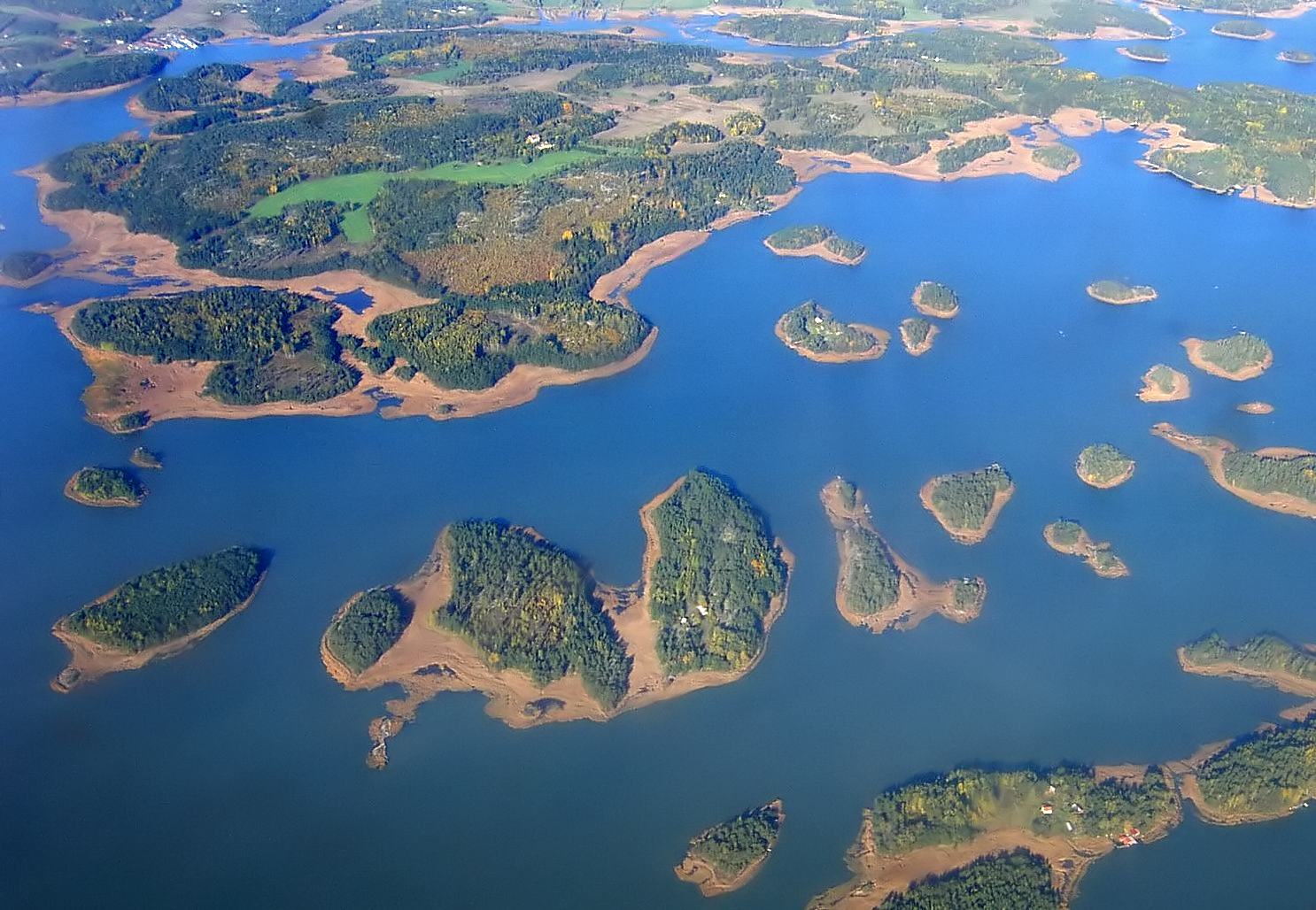
An aerial photograph of Naantali Archipelago, Archipelago Sea

Coastline: 31.119 km (19.336 mi)

Maritime claims:
Territorial sea: 12 nmi (22.2 km; 13.8 mi), 3 nmi (5.56 km; 3.45 mi) in the Gulf of Finland; there is a stretch of international waters between Finnish and Estonian claims; Bogskär has separate internal waters and 3 nmi of territorial waters
Contiguous zone: 24 nmi (44.4 km; 27.6 mi)
Exclusive economic zone: 87,171 km^{2} (33,657 sq mi); extends to continental shelf boundary with Sweden, Estonia, and Russia
Continental shelf: 200 m (660 ft) depth or to the depth of exploitation

Elevation extremes:
lowest point: Baltic Sea 0 m
highest point: Haltitunturi 1,328 m (4,357 ft)

== Resources and land use ==
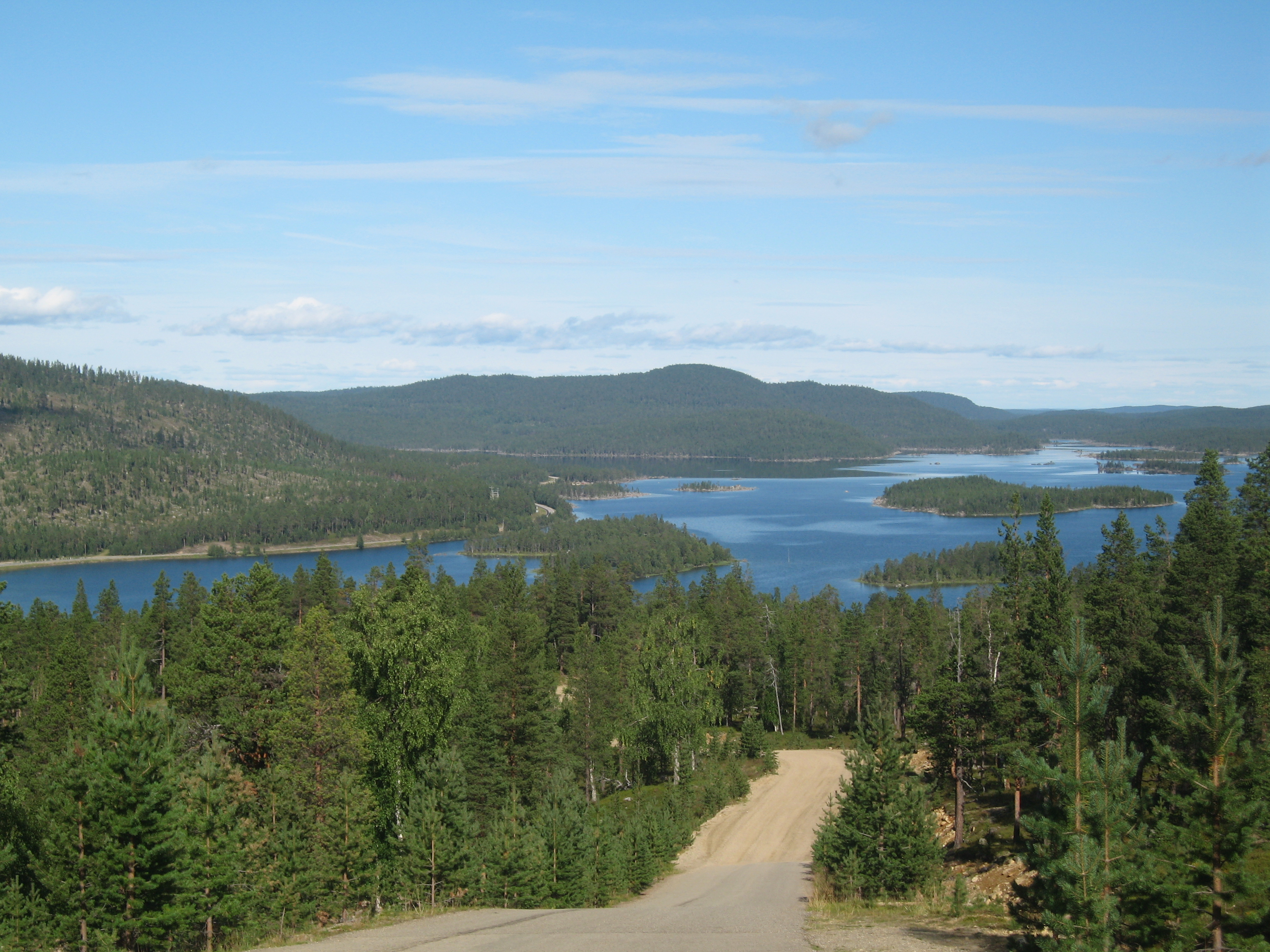
Lake Inari, Lapland

Share of forest area in total land area, top countries (2021). Finland has the tenth highest percentage of forest cover in the world.

Natural resources: timber, iron ore, copper, lead, zinc, chromite, nickel, gold, silver, limestone

Land use:

agricultural land: 7.5% (2018 est.)

arable land: 7.4% (2018 est.)

permanent crops: 0% (2018 est.)

permanent pasture: 0.1% (2018 est.)

forest: 72.9% (2018 est.)

other: 19.6% (2018 est.)

Irrigated land: 690 km^{2} (2012)

Total renewable water resources: 110 billion m^{3} (2017 est.)

Freshwater withdrawal (domestic/industrial/agricultural):

municipal: 400 million m^{3} (2017 est.)

industrial: 1.417 billion m^{3} (2017 est.)

agricultural: 50 million m^{3} (2017 est.)

== Environmental concerns ==
Natural hazards: Cold periods in winter pose a threat to the unprepared.

Environment – current issues: Air pollution from manufacturing and power plants contributing to acid rain; water pollution from industrial wastes, agricultural chemicals; habitat loss threatens wildlife populations.

Environment – international agreements:
party to: Air Pollution, Air Pollution-Heavy Metals, Air Pollution-Multi-effect Protocol, Air Pollution-Nitrogen Oxides, Air Pollution-Persistent Organic Pollutants (signed 2001, ratified 2002), Air Pollution-Sulphur 85, Air Pollution-Sulphur 94, Air Pollution-Volatile Organic Compounds, Antarctic-Environmental Protection, Antarctic-Marine Living Resources, Antarctic Treaty, Biodiversity, Climate Change, Climate Change-Kyoto Protocol (signed May 1998, ratified together with 14 other EU countries May 31, 2002), Climate Change-Paris Agreement, Comprehensive Nuclear Test Ban, Desertification, Endangered Species, Environmental Modification, Hazardous Wastes, Law of the Sea, Marine Dumping-London Convention, Marine Dumping-London Protocol, Marine Life Conservation, Nuclear Test Ban, Ozone Layer Protection, Ship Pollution, Tropical Timber 2006, Wetlands, Whaling.

== Other miscellaneous information ==
- In Finland there are approximately 168,000 lakes of over 0.05 hectares (0.12 acres) in size, and 57,000 of over 1 hectare (2.5 acres). A research project by National Land Survey of Finland is currently (2019) seeking to clarify the definition of 'lake' and the number of lakes in Finland.
- The Finnish capital, Helsinki, is the northernmost capital city on the mainland of any continent, and ranks as second globally (the Icelandic capital Reykjavik takes the first place globally).
- At 1,313 kilometres (816 mi), Finland has the second-longest border with Russia of any European country, surpassed only by Ukraine (1,576 km or 979 mi).
- The third largest lake, Lake Inari in the Lapland province of extreme northern Finland, has a surface area of 1,040.28 square kilometres (401.65 sq mi), a total shore length of 3,308 kilometres (2,055 mi), a maximum depth of 92 metres (302 ft), some 3,318 islands, and a total water volume of 15.9 cubic kilometres (3.8 cu mi). Despite its size and numerous recreational opportunities, the lake is scarcely visited sheerly because of its 1,100-kilometre (680 mi) distance from Helsinki, and its daunting distance to other similarly populated areas in the south of the country.
