= Climate of Finland =

Köppen climate classification types of Finland

The climate of Finland is influenced most by its latitude: Finland is located between 60 and 70 N. Because of Finland's northern location, winter is the longest season. Only on the south coast and in the southwest is summer as long as winter. On average, winter lasts from early December to late March along the southern coast and from early October to mid May in the northernmost locations such as Lapland. This means that southern portions of the country are snow-covered about three to four months of the year, and the northern for about seven months. The long winter causes about half of the annual 500 to 600 millimetres (19.7 to 23.6 in) precipitation in the north to fall as snow. Precipitation in the south amounts to about 600 to 700 millimetres (23.6 to 27.6 in) annually. Like that of the north, it occurs all through the year, though not so much of it is snow.

In Köppen climate classification Finland belongs to the Df group (continental subarctic or boreal climates). The southern coast is Dfb (humid continental mild summer, wet all year), and the rest of the country is Dfc (subarctic with cool summer, wet all year).

The climate of Finland has characteristics of both maritime and continental climate. The Atlantic Ocean to the west and the Eurasian continent to the east interact to modify the climate of the country. The warm waters of the Gulf Stream and the North Atlantic Drift Current, which continuously warm the region, play a big role in the climate of Norway, Sweden and Finland; if it weren't for these currents, the winters in Fennoscandia would be much colder. Westerly winds bring the warm air currents into the Baltic areas and to the country's shores, moderating winter temperatures, especially in the south and southwest in cities like Helsinki and Turku where winter highs tend to be between 0 and 5 °C (32 and 41 °F) but a cold snap like the one that occurred in mid-January 2016 can cause temperatures to plunge well below −20 °C (−4 °F). These winds, because of clouds associated with weather systems accompanying the westerlies, also decrease the amount of sunshine received during the summer. By contrast, the continental high pressure system situated over the Eurasian continent counteracts the maritime influences, occasionally causing severe winters and high temperatures in the summer.

== Temperature ==
The warmest annual average temperature in Southwestern Finland is 6.5 °C (43.7 °F). From there the temperature decreases gradually towards north and east. The Suomenselkä and Maanselkä drainage divides rise higher than the surrounding areas, and the climate there is cooler than at same latitudes elsewhere in Finland. The Barents Sea between Finland and the North Pole is open even in winter, so northerly airflows are not as cold as in Siberia or Alaska.

The highest temperature ever recorded is 37.2 °C (99.0 °F) (Liperi, July 29, 2010). The lowest, −51.5 °C (−60.7 °F) (Kittilä, January 28, 1999). The annual average temperature is relatively high in the southwestern part of the country (5.0 to 7.5 °C or 41.0 to 45.5 °F), with quite mild winters and warm summers, and low in the northeastern part of Lapland (Finland) (0 to −4 °C or 32 to 25 °F).

Temperature extremes for every month:

Climate data for Finland
Month	Jan	Feb	Mar	Apr	May	Jun	Jul	Aug	Sep	Oct	Nov	Dec	Year
Record high °C (°F)	10.9 (51.6)	11.8 (53.2)	17.5 (63.5)	25.5 (77.9)	31.0 (87.8)	33.8 (92.8)	37.2 (99.0)	33.8 (92.8)	28.8 (83.8)	21.1 (70.0)	16.6 (61.9)	11.3 (52.3)	37.2 (99.0)
Record low °C (°F)	−51.5 (−60.7)	−49.0 (−56.2)	−44.3 (−47.7)	−36.0 (−32.8)	−24.6 (−12.3)	−7.7 (18.1)	−5.0 (23.0)	−10.8 (12.6)	−18.7 (−1.7)	−31.8 (−25.2)	−42.0 (−43.6)	−47.0 (−52.6)	−51.5 (−60.7)
Source: http://ilmatieteenlaitos.fi/lampotilaennatyksia

=== Record highs and lows ===
Record highs by month
Month	Temp.	Date	Location
January	+10.9 °C (51.6 °F)	January 6, 1973	Mariehamn, Åland
February	+11.8 °C (53.2 °F)	February 28, 1943	Ilmala, Helsinki, Uusimaa
March	+17.5 °C (63.5 °F)	March 27, 2007	Helsinki-Vantaa Airport, Vantaa, Uusimaa
April	+25.5 °C (77.9 °F)	April 27, 1921	Jyväskylä, Central Finland
May	+31.0 °C (87.8 °F)	May 30/31, 1995	Lapinjärvi, Uusimaa
June	+33.8 °C (92.8 °F)	June 24, 1934	Ähtäri, South Ostrobothnia
July	+37.2 °C (99.0 °F)	July 29, 2010	Joensuu Airport, Liperi, North Karelia
August	+33.8 °C (92.8 °F)	August 7, 2010	Heinola, Päijät-Häme, Puumala, South Savo
August	+33.8 °C (92.8 °F)	August 8, 2010	Lahti, Päijät-Häme
September	+28.8 °C (83.8 °F)	September 6, 1968	Rauma, Satakunta
October	+21.1 °C (70.0 °F)	October 14, 2018	Oulu Airport, North Ostrobothnia
November	+16.6 °C (61.9 °F)	November 6, 2020	Mariehamn Airport, Jomala, Åland
December	+11.3 °C (52.3 °F)	December 20, 2015	Pori and Kokemäki, Satakunta

Record lows by month
Month	Temp.	Date	Location
January	−51.5 °C (−60.7 °F)	January 28, 1999	Kittilä, Pokka, Lapland
February	−49.0 °C (−56.2 °F)	February 5, 1912	Sodankylä, Lapland
March	−44.3 °C (−47.7 °F)	March 1, 1971	Salla, Tuntsa, Lapland
April	−36.0 °C (−32.8 °F)	April 2/9, 1912	Kuusamo, Northern Ostrobothnia; Sodankylä, Lapland
May	−24.6 °C (−12.3 °F)	May 1, 1971	Enontekiö, Kalmankaltio, Lapland
June	−7.7 °C (18.1 °F)	June 1, 2023	Saana, Kilpisjärvi, Enontekiö, Lapland
July	−5.0 °C (23.0 °F)	July 1/12, 1958	Enontekiö, Kilpisjärvi, Lapland
August	−10.8 °C (12.6 °F)	August 26, 1980	Salla, Naruskajärvi, Lapland
September	−18.7 °C (−1.7 °F)	September 26, 1968	Sodankylä, Vuotso, Lapland
October	−31.8 °C (−25.2 °F)	October 25, 1968	Sodankylä, Lapland
November	−42.0 °C (−43.6 °F)	November 30, 1915	Sodankylä, Lapland
December	−47.0 °C (−52.6 °F)	December 21, 1919	Pielisjärvi, North Karelia

- Measurements are made at the height of 2 metres. A record cold of sorts for June, −9.1 °C (15.6 °F) was measured on June 2, 2023 in Koivuniemi, Virolahti, Kymenlaakso. However, the measurement was made at ground level, so it could not be accepted as a record.

=== Climate data ===
Climate data for Helsinki (1991–2020 normals, records 1900–present)
Month	Jan	Feb	Mar	Apr	May	Jun	Jul	Aug	Sep	Oct	Nov	Dec	Year
Record high °C (°F)	8.5 (47.3)	10.3 (50.5)	15.1 (59.2)	21.9 (71.4)	27.6 (81.7)	31.7 (89.1)	33.2 (91.8)	31.2 (88.2)	26.2 (79.2)	17.6 (63.7)	13.4 (56.1)	10.5 (50.9)	33.2 (91.8)
Mean daily maximum °C (°F)	−0.7 (30.7)	−1.3 (29.7)	2.3 (36.1)	8.1 (46.6)	14.6 (58.3)	18.8 (65.8)	21.9 (71.4)	20.5 (68.9)	15.4 (59.7)	9.2 (48.6)	4.4 (39.9)	1.4 (34.5)	9.6 (49.3)
Daily mean °C (°F)	−3.1 (26.4)	−3.8 (25.2)	−0.7 (30.7)	4.4 (39.9)	10.4 (50.7)	14.9 (58.8)	18.1 (64.6)	16.9 (62.4)	12.3 (54.1)	6.6 (43.9)	2.4 (36.3)	−0.7 (30.7)	6.5 (43.7)
Mean daily minimum °C (°F)	−5.6 (21.9)	−6.3 (20.7)	−3.6 (25.5)	1.1 (34.0)	6.4 (43.5)	11.2 (52.2)	14.5 (58.1)	13.5 (56.3)	9.3 (48.7)	4.2 (39.6)	0.4 (32.7)	−2.9 (26.8)	3.5 (38.3)
Record low °C (°F)	−34.3 (−29.7)	−31.5 (−24.7)	−24.5 (−12.1)	−16.3 (2.7)	−4.8 (23.4)	0.7 (33.3)	5.4 (41.7)	2.8 (37.0)	−4.5 (23.9)	−11.6 (11.1)	−18.6 (−1.5)	−29.5 (−21.1)	−34.3 (−29.7)
Average precipitation mm (inches)	53 (2.1)	38 (1.5)	34 (1.3)	34 (1.3)	38 (1.5)	60 (2.4)	57 (2.2)	81 (3.2)	56 (2.2)	73 (2.9)	69 (2.7)	58 (2.3)	653 (25.7)
Average rainy days (≥ 0.1 mm)	19	16	13	12	11	14	12	13	14	16	17	19	176
Mean monthly sunshine hours	38	70	138	194	284	297	291	238	150	93	36	29	1,858
Average ultraviolet index	0	0	1	3	4	5	5	4	3	1	0	0	2
Source 1: FMI climatological normals for Finland 1991–2020
Source 2: record highs and lows

Climate data for Tampere (1981–2010 normals, precipitation 1981-2010, extremes 1900–present)
Month	Jan	Feb	Mar	Apr	May	Jun	Jul	Aug	Sep	Oct	Nov	Dec	Year
Record high °C (°F)	8.0 (46.4)	9.4 (48.9)	14.9 (58.8)	24.2 (75.6)	28.4 (83.1)	31.7 (89.1)	33.1 (91.6)	32.1 (89.8)	24.8 (76.6)	18.4 (65.1)	11.1 (52.0)	9.6 (49.3)	33.1 (91.6)
Mean daily maximum °C (°F)	−3.4 (25.9)	−3.5 (25.7)	1.2 (34.2)	8.2 (46.8)	15.4 (59.7)	19.5 (67.1)	22.2 (72.0)	19.9 (67.8)	14.0 (57.2)	7.5 (45.5)	1.5 (34.7)	−1.9 (28.6)	8.4 (47.1)
Daily mean °C (°F)	−6.4 (20.5)	−6.9 (19.6)	−2.8 (27.0)	3.3 (37.9)	9.7 (49.5)	14.1 (57.4)	16.9 (62.4)	15.0 (59.0)	9.8 (49.6)	4.6 (40.3)	0.6 (33.1)	−4.5 (23.9)	4.4 (39.9)
Mean daily minimum °C (°F)	−9.7 (14.5)	−10.6 (12.9)	−6.6 (20.1)	−1.3 (29.7)	3.8 (38.8)	8.6 (47.5)	11.7 (53.1)	10.4 (50.7)	5.9 (42.6)	1.9 (35.4)	−3.0 (26.6)	−7.6 (18.3)	0.3 (32.5)
Record low °C (°F)	−37.0 (−34.6)	−36.8 (−34.2)	−29.6 (−21.3)	−19.6 (−3.3)	−7.3 (18.9)	−2.8 (27.0)	1.8 (35.2)	−0.4 (31.3)	−6.7 (19.9)	−14.8 (5.4)	−22.5 (−8.5)	−34.2 (−29.6)	−37.0 (−34.6)
Average precipitation mm (inches)	41 (1.6)	29 (1.1)	31 (1.2)	32 (1.3)	41 (1.6)	66 (2.6)	75 (3.0)	72 (2.8)	58 (2.3)	60 (2.4)	51 (2.0)	42 (1.7)	598 (23.5)
Average snowfall cm (inches)	32.3 (12.7)	31.4 (12.4)	29.5 (11.6)	13.9 (5.5)	1.6 (0.6)	0.1 (0.0)	0 (0)	0 (0)	0 (0)	3.3 (1.3)	13.1 (5.2)	27.2 (10.7)	152.4 (60)
Average precipitation days (≥ 0.1 mm)	22	18	16	12	12	13	15	15	14	17	21	22	197
Average relative humidity (%)	90	87	82	70	63	66	69	76	82	87	91	92	80
Source 1: weatheronline.co.uk
Source 2: FMI (precipitation, record highs and lows)

Climate data for Turku (1991-2020 normals, extremes 1900-present)
Month	Jan	Feb	Mar	Apr	May	Jun	Jul	Aug	Sep	Oct	Nov	Dec	Year
Record high °C (°F)	8.5 (47.3)	10.2 (50.4)	15.8 (60.4)	24.5 (76.1)	30.0 (86.0)	32.0 (89.6)	35.9 (96.6)	32.6 (90.7)	27.8 (82.0)	18.9 (66.0)	14.0 (57.2)	11.0 (51.8)	35.9 (96.6)
Mean daily maximum °C (°F)	−1.1 (30.0)	−1.2 (29.8)	2.6 (36.7)	9.1 (48.4)	15.5 (59.9)	19.5 (67.1)	22.6 (72.7)	21.1 (70.0)	15.7 (60.3)	8.8 (47.8)	3.6 (38.5)	0.7 (33.3)	9.7 (49.5)
Daily mean °C (°F)	−3.8 (25.2)	−4.5 (23.9)	−1.3 (29.7)	4.1 (39.4)	10.0 (50.0)	14.4 (57.9)	17.5 (63.5)	16.2 (61.2)	11.3 (52.3)	5.7 (42.3)	1.5 (34.7)	−1.5 (29.3)	5.8 (42.5)
Mean daily minimum °C (°F)	−6.5 (20.3)	−7.1 (19.2)	−4.7 (23.5)	−0.2 (31.6)	4.6 (40.3)	9.3 (48.7)	12.5 (54.5)	11.6 (52.9)	7.4 (45.3)	2.8 (37.0)	−0.9 (30.4)	−4.1 (24.6)	2.1 (35.8)
Record low °C (°F)	−35.5 (−31.9)	−35.2 (−31.4)	−32.8 (−27.0)	−21.0 (−5.8)	−6.6 (20.1)	−2.2 (28.0)	1.8 (35.2)	0.2 (32.4)	−6.9 (19.6)	−15.0 (5.0)	−22.3 (−8.1)	−33.8 (−28.8)	−35.5 (−31.9)
Average precipitation mm (inches)	58 (2.3)	42 (1.7)	39 (1.5)	32 (1.3)	35 (1.4)	55 (2.2)	74 (2.9)	73 (2.9)	59 (2.3)	73 (2.9)	71 (2.8)	73 (2.9)	684 (27.1)
Average precipitation days	11	9	8	7	7	8	8	10	9	11	13	12	113
Mean monthly sunshine hours	40	75	134	204	284	276	287	230	155	89	38	27	1,839
Source: Climatological statistics for the normal period 1991–2020

Climate data for Oulu (1991-2020 normals, records 1921 - present)
Month	Jan	Feb	Mar	Apr	May	Jun	Jul	Aug	Sep	Oct	Nov	Dec	Year
Record high °C (°F)	9.3 (48.7)	7.8 (46.0)	11.5 (52.7)	23.9 (75.0)	29.9 (85.8)	32.3 (90.1)	33.3 (91.9)	30.5 (86.9)	25.4 (77.7)	21.1 (70.0)	11.2 (52.2)	8.2 (46.8)	33.3 (91.9)
Mean daily maximum °C (°F)	−4.8 (23.4)	−4.7 (23.5)	−0.4 (31.3)	5.8 (42.4)	12.6 (54.7)	17.9 (64.2)	21.1 (70.0)	18.9 (66.0)	13.2 (55.8)	5.8 (42.4)	0.5 (32.9)	−2.7 (27.1)	6.9 (44.5)
Daily mean °C (°F)	−8.2 (17.2)	−8.4 (16.9)	−4.4 (24.1)	1.6 (34.9)	8.0 (46.4)	13.7 (56.7)	16.7 (62.1)	14.6 (58.3)	9.6 (49.3)	3.3 (37.9)	−1.6 (29.1)	−5.3 (22.5)	3.3 (38.0)
Mean daily minimum °C (°F)	−11.9 (10.6)	−12.1 (10.2)	−8.3 (17.1)	−2.5 (27.5)	3.4 (38.1)	9.3 (48.7)	12.4 (54.3)	10.6 (51.1)	6.0 (42.8)	0.6 (33.1)	−4.2 (24.4)	−8.8 (16.2)	−0.5 (31.2)
Record low °C (°F)	−37.5 (−35.5)	−41.5 (−42.7)	−32 (−26)	−21.4 (−6.5)	−9.1 (15.6)	−6.1 (21.0)	3.6 (38.5)	−1.5 (29.3)	−8.0 (17.6)	−20.6 (−5.1)	−33 (−27)	−37.2 (−35.0)	−41.5 (−42.7)
Average precipitation mm (inches)	32 (1.3)	29 (1.1)	26 (1.0)	23 (0.9)	40 (1.6)	51 (2.0)	80 (3.1)	62 (2.4)	49 (1.9)	51 (2.0)	43 (1.7)	39 (1.5)	525 (20.5)
Average snowfall cm (inches)	33 (13)	46 (18)	43 (17)	7 (2.8)	—	—	—	—	—	—	4 (1.6)	17 (6.7)	150 (59)
Average precipitation days	9	8	7	6	8	8	10	10	8	10	10	10	104
Average relative humidity (%) (daily average)	87	86	82	73	67	66	71	76	82	86	90	89	80
Mean monthly sunshine hours	24	69	137	208	273	296	283	212	133	69	28	8	1,740
Average ultraviolet index	0	0	1	2	3	4	4	3	2	1	0	0	2
Source 1: FMI
Source 2: FMI (record highs and lows 1961–present) FMI(record highs and lows 1921–1961) Source 3: Finland. Oulu climate (average monthly UV index)

== Wind ==
The most common wind direction in Finland is from southwest, but the low pressure areas typical for these latitudes cause great variations in wind speed and direction.

Storm, defined as at least one Finnish coastal station reporting at least 21 m/s as a 10-minutes average wind speed, is observed on Finnish seas on average 19 days a year. Strong winds are most frequent between October and January. The worst storm in Finnish history has been called the storm of August 1890, when the average wind speed in Helsinki was claimed to be up to 50 m/s, while in the North Baltic Sea it was estimated to be around 30–35 m/s; it was said to have claimed at least three lives, but the actual casualty toll may be higher.

== Snow ==
The first snow cover is observed on average in September in Lapland, and in November in Southern and western areas. Permanent snow cover time starts typically around Christmas in the Southwestern corner, but before mid-November in most of Lapland. The maximum snow depth is usually found around March.

Snow and supercooled droplets can accumulate in tree crowns and cause damage to trees. The trunks of pine trees can break under the weight of a snow-loaded crown, and deciduous trees can bend permanently. The snow load of a tree is typically 100–150 kg per one meter tree trunk, but the heaviest measured snow load of a spruce was over 3000 kilograms.

Snowmelt contributes to spring floods. In north, the peak flow of rivers always happens in spring, in the south 70–80% of floods happen in spring. In the south, maximum flow happens in mid-April, in the north, in mid-May.

It is predicted that as the Barents Sea gets less frozen in the coming winters and it becomes thus "Atlantified" additional evaporation will increase future snowfalls in Finland and much of continental Europe.

== Impacts of the climate change ==
=== Temperature and weather changes ===
Between 2010 and March 2019, there were 102 days with record daily temperatures reported, clearly more than at any time in the Finnish Meteorological Institute’s (FMI) measurement history. Temperature patterns show that Finland is experiencing climate change.

Köppen climate classification map for Finland for 1980–2016

2071–2100 map under the most intense climate change scenario. Mid-range scenarios are currently considered more likely

The annual Finnish mean temperature has risen 2.3 °C since the middle of the 19th century. Warming has been greatest in early winter, nearly 5 °C. The month of July 2018 in Finland had the highest-ever temperatures recorded by the Finnish Meteorological Institute, founded in 1838. In January 2020 Finland had the mildest winter in 100 years.

=== Extreme weather events ===
Summer 2010 storms (Asta 29.-30.7 Vera 4.8, Lahja 7.8, and Sylvi 8.8) caused widespread damage. Insurance companies paid €81.6 million for the storm damages. Trees fell 9.1 million m^{3}. 480 000 persons had power line breaks, up to 6 weeks. 35 000 km of the power line was damaged. Compensation costs were over €10 million for the power customers. Other power company costs included €18 million for the repair and $4 million for extra investments. Co-operation between the responsible organisations and persons did not run effectively after the storms.

Storm Tapani hit Finland on St Stephen's Day in 2011. The previous storm of this type in Finland was Janika in November 2001. The highest momentary gust on land was 31.5 m/s. Power outages peaked on December 12, 2011, when over 300,000 homes had no electricity.

Finland had a heatwave above + 30 °C in June 2013. This occurred during the same period as the 2013 European floods.

In 2013, autumn storm Eino resulted in over 200,000 Finnish homes losing power, affecting about 10% of Finnish families. Maximum wind speed was 27.3 m/s inland and 32.9 m/s in sea.
