= Territory =

Area of land under a jurisdiction

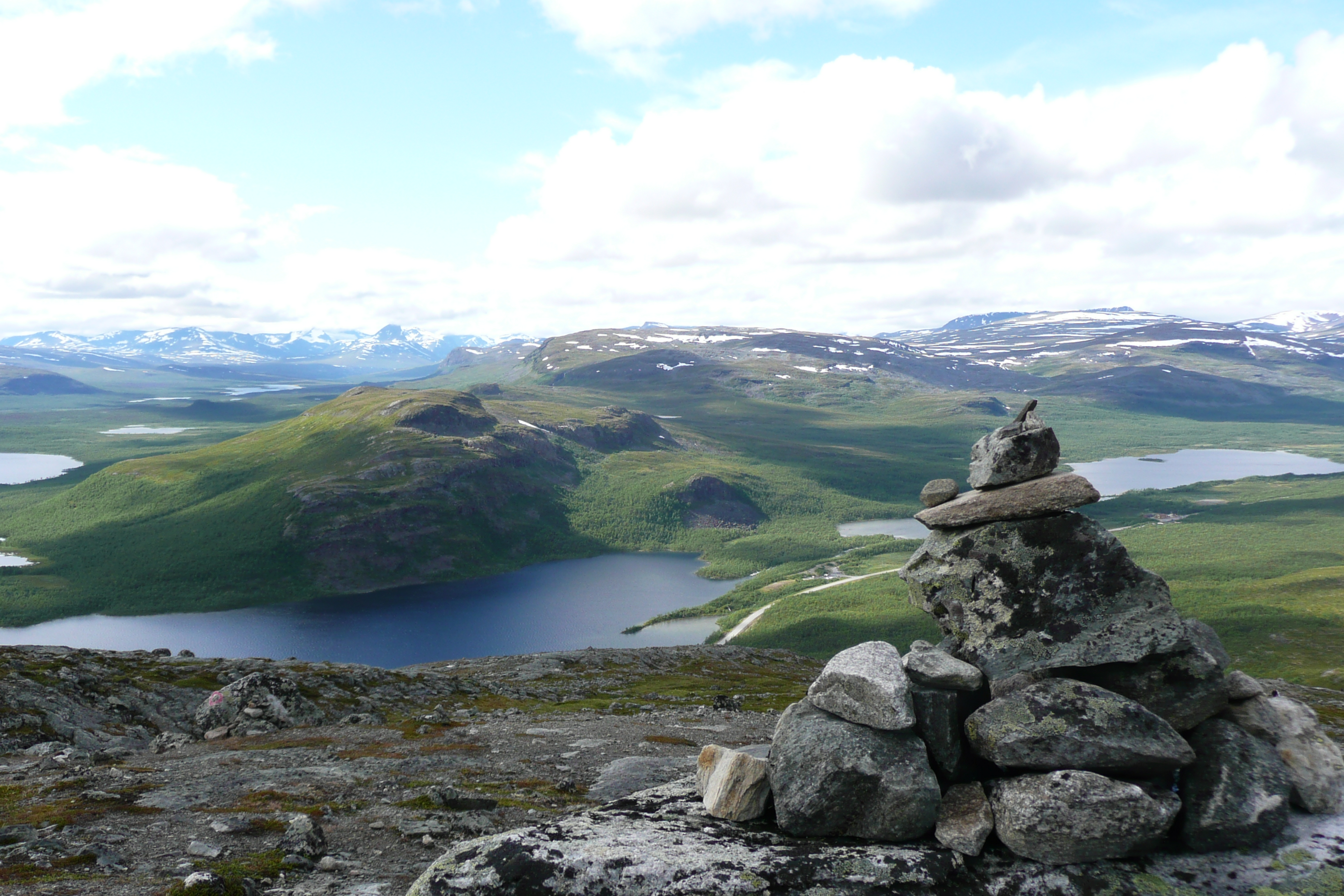
Lapland is a sparsely populated territory in Northern Europe. A view from Saana in Finnish Lapland

A territory is an area of land, sea, or space, belonging or connected to a particular country, person, or animal.

In international politics, a territory is usually a geographic area which has not been granted the powers of self-government, i.e. an area that is under the jurisdiction of a sovereign state.

As a subdivision, a territory in most countries is an organized division of an area that is controlled by a country but is not formally developed into, or incorporated into, a political unit of that country, which political units are of equal status to one another and are often referred to by words such as "provinces", "regions", or "states". In its narrower sense, it is "a geographic region, such as a colonial possession, that is dependent on an external government."

== Etymology ==
The origins of the word "territory" begin with the Proto-Indo-European root ters ('to dry'). From this emerged the Latin word terra ('earth, land') and later the Latin word territorium ('land around a town'). Territory made its debut as a word in Middle English during the 14th century. At this point the suffix -orium, which denotes place, was replaced with -ory which also expresses place.

== Types ==
Examples for different types of territory include the following:

- Capital territory or federal capital territory, usually a specially designated territory where a country's seat of government is located. As such, in the federal model of government, no one state or territory takes pre-eminence because the capital lies within its borders. A capital territory can be one specific form of federal district.
- Dependent territory, a territory that is not an independent sovereign state, yet remains politically outside the governing state's integral area.
- Disputed territory, a geographic area claimed by two or more rival governments. For example, the territory of Kashmir is claimed by the governments of both India and Pakistan; for each country involved in the dispute, the whole territory is claimed as a part of the existing state. Another example is the Republic of China (commonly labeled "Taiwan"), whose sovereignty status is disputed by and territory claimed by the People's Republic of China.
- Federal territory, an area within the direct and usually exclusive jurisdiction of the central or national government within a federation.
- Maritime territory
- Occupied territory, a region that is under the military control of an outside power that has not gained universal recognition from the international community. Current examples are Crimea, occupied by the Russian Federation; East Jerusalem, the Gaza Strip, the Golan Heights, and the West Bank, occupied by the State of Israel; Western Sahara, partially occupied by the Kingdom of Morocco. Other examples of occupied territory include the country of Kuwait after it was briefly invaded by Iraq in 1990, Iraq after the American invasion of 2003, Germany after World War II, and Kosovo after 1999.
- Overseas territory
- Unorganized territory, a region of land without a "normally" constituted system of government. This does not mean that the territory has no government at all or that it is an unclaimed territory. In practice, such territories are always sparsely populated.

=== Overseas territory ===
Overseas territory is a broad designation for a territorial entity that is separated from the country that governs it by an ocean. An overseas territory may be either a constituent part of the governing state or a dependent territory.

Examples include:

- The Faroe Islands and Greenland are overseas autonomous territories of the Kingdom of Denmark that are internally self-governing.
- Overseas France includes the five overseas collectivities of France, which are broadly autonomous territories, as well as overseas regions and overseas departments, which are essentially the same as the regions and departments in Metropolitan France. Nonetheless, all are integral parts of the French Fifth Republic.
- Three special municipalities of the Netherlands – Bonaire, Sint Eustatius and Saba – are located in the Caribbean Netherlands. Apart from the Netherlands, the Kingdom of the Netherlands consists of three more constituent countries located in the Dutch Caribbean; Aruba, Curaçao, and Sint Maarten. All countries participate on a basis of equality as partners in the Kingdom.
- The Azores and Madeira are the Autonomous Regions of Portugal.
- The fourteen British Overseas Territories are dependent territories of the British Crown with varying degrees of self-governance, not parts of the United Kingdom itself nor of any of its four constituent countries.
- Non-contiguous U.S. territories, territories cut off from the contiguous United States by foreign land borders and are accessible by sea.

== See also ==
- Ad coelum
- List of enclaves and exclaves
- Category:Territories under military occupation
