= Könkämäeno =

Könkämäeno Könkämäälven
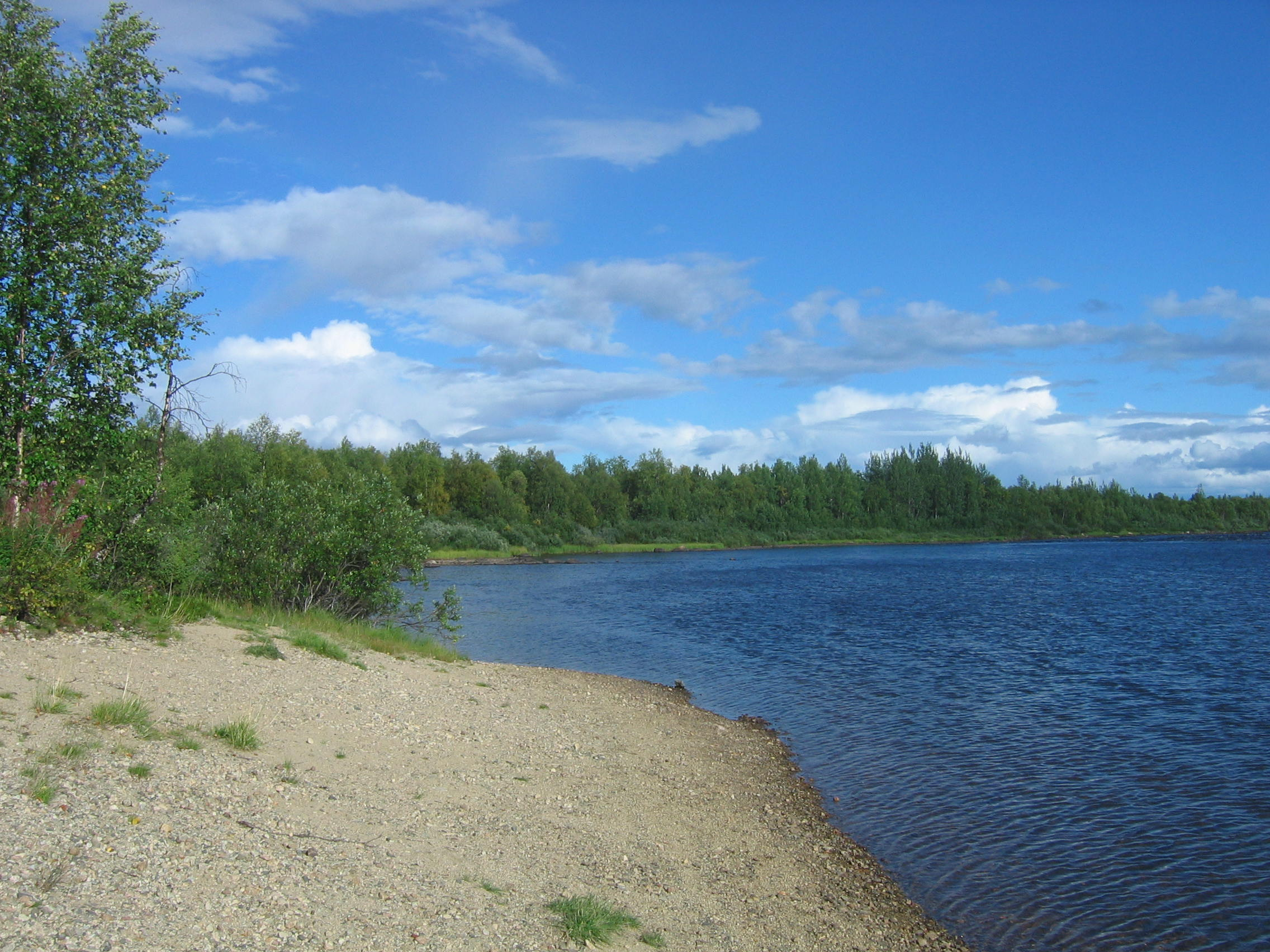

Location
- Countries: Finland; Sweden

Physical characteristics
- Source: Lake Kilpisjärvi
  - coordinates: 68°56′17″N 20°51′01″E
  - elevation: 473 m (1,552 ft)
- Mouth: Muonio River
  - coordinates: 68°29′04″N 22°17′45″E
  - elevation: 329 m (1,079 ft)
- Length: 150 km (93 mi)

Könkämäeno (Swedish: Könkämäälven; Northern Sami: Geaggáneatnu; Meänkieli: Könkämäväylä) is a river in Finland and Sweden in Finnish and Swedish Lapland. It forms the upper course of the Muonionjoki river, which begins where the Könkämäeno river meets the Lätäseno river. The river begins from Lake Kilpisjärvi and forms together with Muonionjoki and the lower course of Torne River the border between Sweden and Finland.

== See also ==
- List of rivers in Finland
