= Intra fauces terra =

Intra fauces terrae is a Legal Latin phrase which translates as "In the jaws of the land". It is used to define the territorial waters.

== External Reference ==
- Legal Term Glossary
