= KAIRA =

Kilpisjärvi Atmospheric Imaging Receiver Array
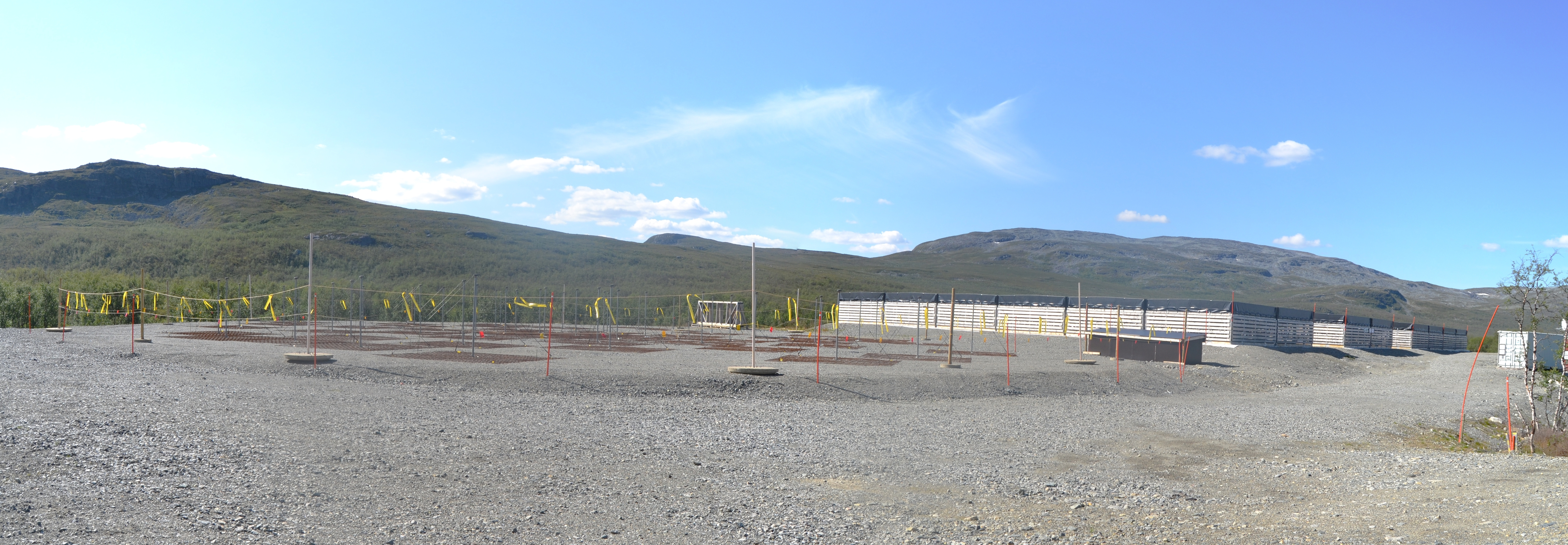
- Alternative names: KAI
- Organization: University of Oulu
- Location: Kilpisjärvi, Enontekiö, Lapland, Finland
- Coordinates: 69°04′15″N 20°45′43″E
- Altitude: 495 m (1,624 ft)
- Established: 2011
- Website: www.sgo.fi/KAIRA/
- Telescopes: KAIRA HBA; KAIRA LBA
- Location of KAIRA
- Related media on Commons

The Kilpisjärvi Atmospheric Imaging Receiver Array (KAIRA) is an astronomical observatory operated by the Sodankylä Geophysical Observatory on behalf of Oulu University. It is located at Kilpisjärvi, Enontekiö near the border with Norway. It comprises two LOFAR-derived radio telescope systems and is capable of observing at HF and VHF radio frequencies. It is used for atmospheric, near-Earth space and astronomical research. KAIRA uses LOFAR phased-array antennas and digital signal-processing hardware. The phased array configuration has no moving parts and with digital control, allows KAIRA to quickly scan the sky, giving KAIRA a large field of view. KAIRA can produce a continuous all-sky image of the radio transparency of ionosphere, using cosmic radio noise for "illumination" (riometry). KAIRA can also obtain electron density profiles in the atmosphere. This allows the study of the interaction of the solar wind with the atmosphere, such as in aurora borealis and other space weather phenomena. In addition to near-space imaging, the use of KAIRA has been demonstrated for long-baseline interferometry observations of pulsars.

It operates as either a stand-alone passive receiver, as a receiver for the EISCAT VHF incoherent scatter radar (a conventional dish-type emitter) located at Ramfjordmoen, near Tromsø, Norway, or for use in conjunction with other regional VHF experiments. The site is also a pathfinder for the EISCAT_3D system, a planned network of KAIRA-like phased array systems for three-dimensional imaging.

The system consists of a phased array receivers grouped in two separate arrays – one composed of 48 LOFAR Low-Band Antennas (LBA) covering the 10–90 MHz band and another composed of 48 LOFAR High-Band Antenna (HBA) covering the 110–270 MHz range. The HBA array is oriented in the direction of the EISCAT Tromsø radar, which transmits at approximately 224 MHz. Together with the EISCAT transmitter, KAIRA forms a bistatic radar system, capable on performing observation with at least 20 simultaneously beams pointing at different altitudes along the EISCAT transmitter beams.

The LBA array has been configured approximately the same as the inner configuration of a LOFAR remote station (RS-INNER). The circular, quasi-random antenna distribution has been chosen to optimise the beam pattern of the array. The LBA array is used for solar astronomy, general radio astronomy, ionospheric scintillation, multi-frequency riometry and other passive receiver experiments.

== See also ==
- EISCAT
- List of astronomical observatories
- LOFAR
