= Lake Kilpisjärvi =

Lake in Enontekiö, Finland, and Kiruna, Sweden

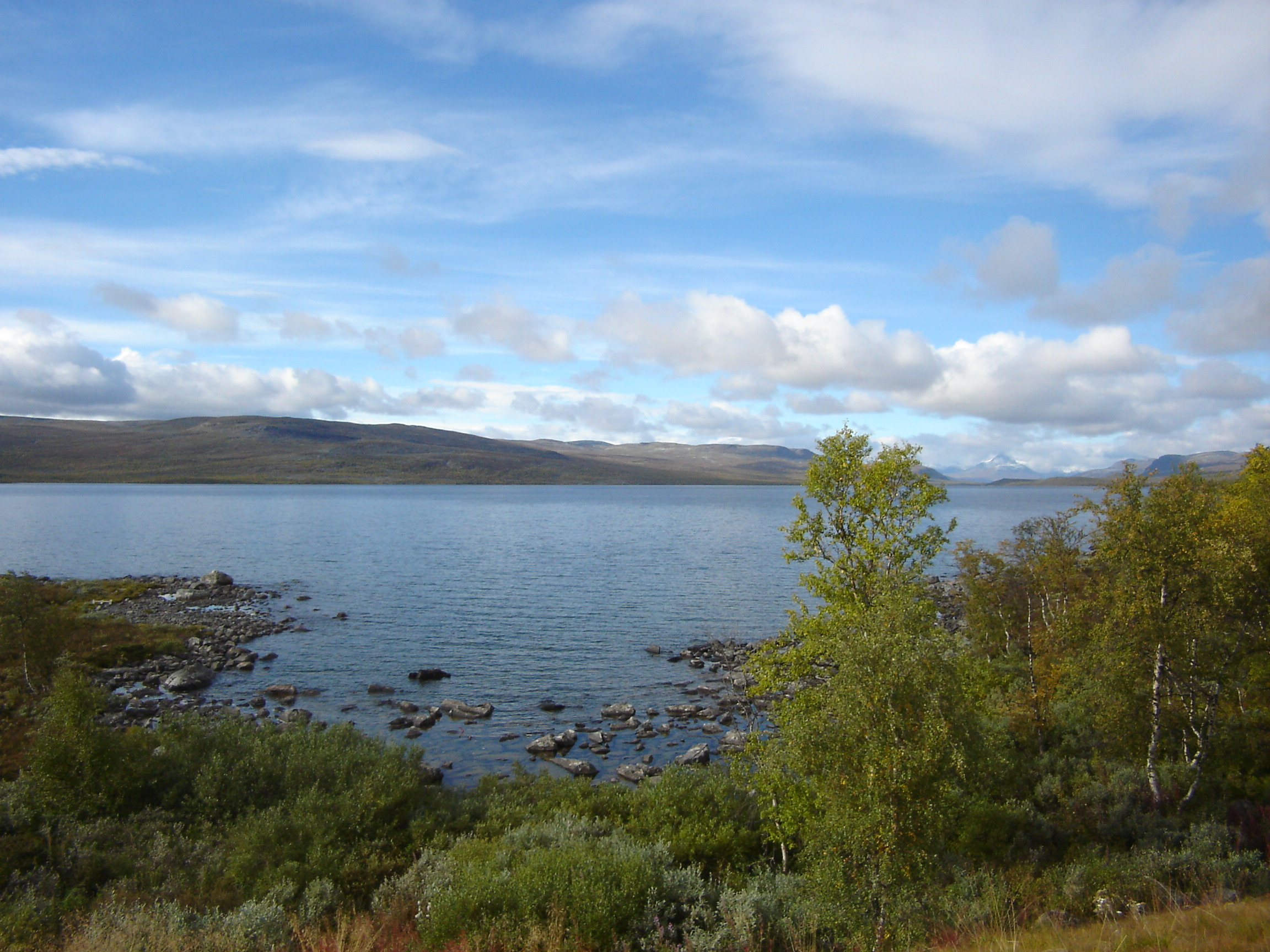
- Kilpisjärvi seen from the Finnish side

- Location within Finland
- Location: Enontekiö, Finland / Kiruna, Sweden
- Coordinates: 69°01′N 020°49′E
- Primary outflows: Könkämäeno
- Basin countries: Finland, Sweden
- Surface area: 37.33 km^{2} (14.41 sq mi)
- Average depth: 19.5 m (64 ft)
- Max. depth: 57 m (187 ft)
- Water volume: 0.73 km^{3} (0.18 cu mi)
- Surface elevation: 472.8 m (1,551 ft)
- Frozen: 223 days
- Settlements: Kilpisjärvi

Kilpisjärvi is a medium-sized lake located at the north-western tip of Finland and northernmost Sweden. Treriksröset, the point where the borders of Finland, Sweden and Norway join is located some 2.5 kilometres (1.6 mi) northwest from the lake.

The lake is divided into two parts, Kilpisjärvi (Northern Sami: Bajit Gilbbesjávri) and Alajärvi (Vuolit Gilbbesjávri).

Being located on the Scandinavian Mountains, the lake is surrounded by numerous fells, most notably Saana. The northern location and high elevation cause the lake to be frozen most of the year.
