= Muonionjoki =

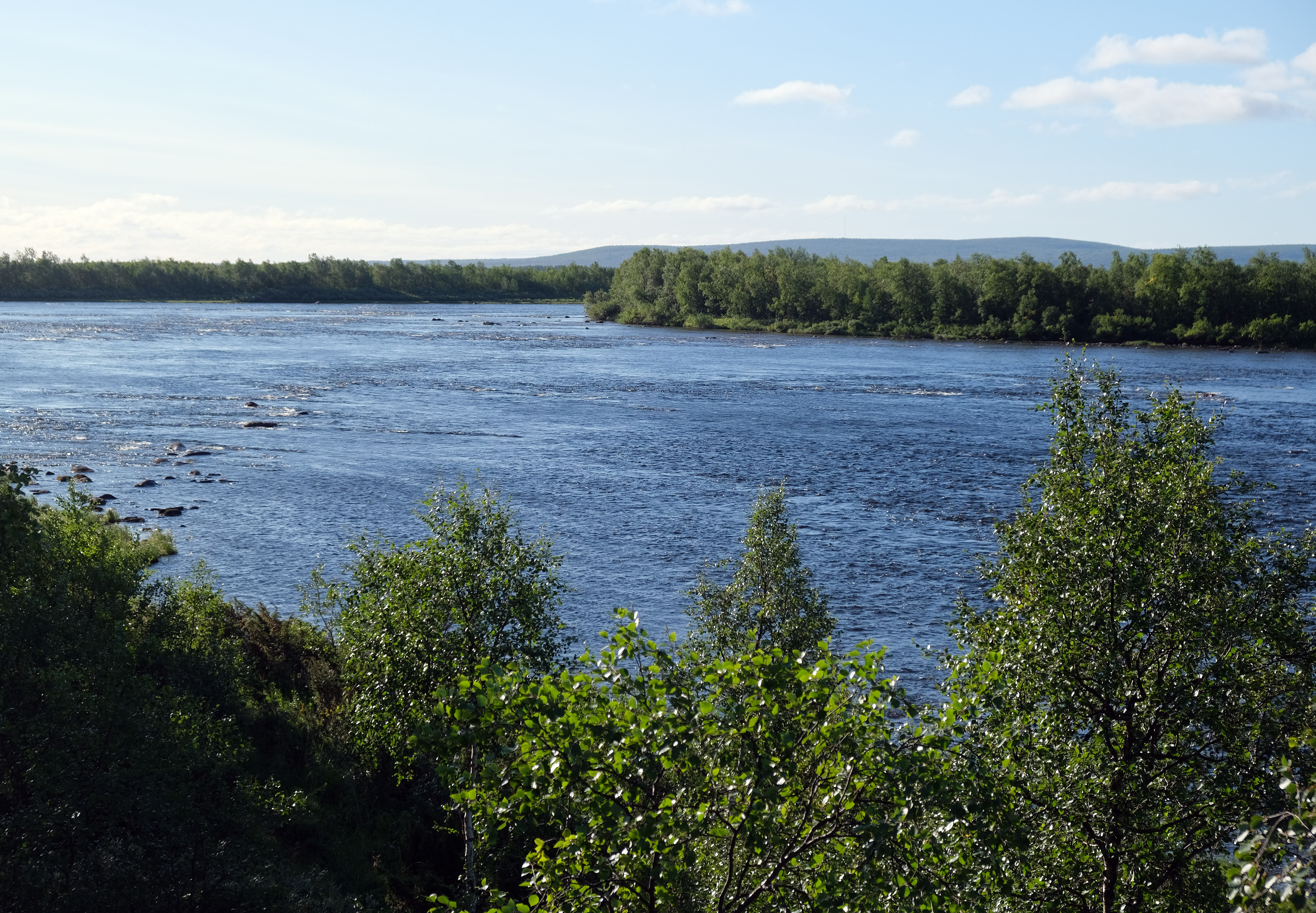
- Mannakoski rapid in Muonionjoki
- Native name: Muonionjoki or Kätkäsuvanto (Finnish); Muonio älv or Muonioälven (Swedish); Muonionväylä (Meänkieli)

Location
- Countries: Sweden; Finland

Physical characteristics
- Source: Confluence of Könkämäeno and Lätäseno
  - coordinates: 68°29′04″N 22°17′45″E
- Mouth: Torne River
  - coordinates: 67°10′51″N 23°33′30″E
- Length: 387 km (240 mi)
- Basin size: 14,430 km^{2} (5,570 sq mi)
- Discharge
  - average: 165 m^{3}/s (5,800 cu ft/s)

Muonionjoki (Finnish: Muonionjoki or Kätkäsuvanto; Swedish: Muonio älv or Muonioälven [mʉˈǒːnɪɔ ˈɛlːv]; Meänkieli: Muonionväylä) is a river in northern Finland and Sweden. It is a tributary of the Tornio. Together the two rivers form the border between Finland and Sweden. The river is 230 kilometres long.
