= Stöttingfjället =

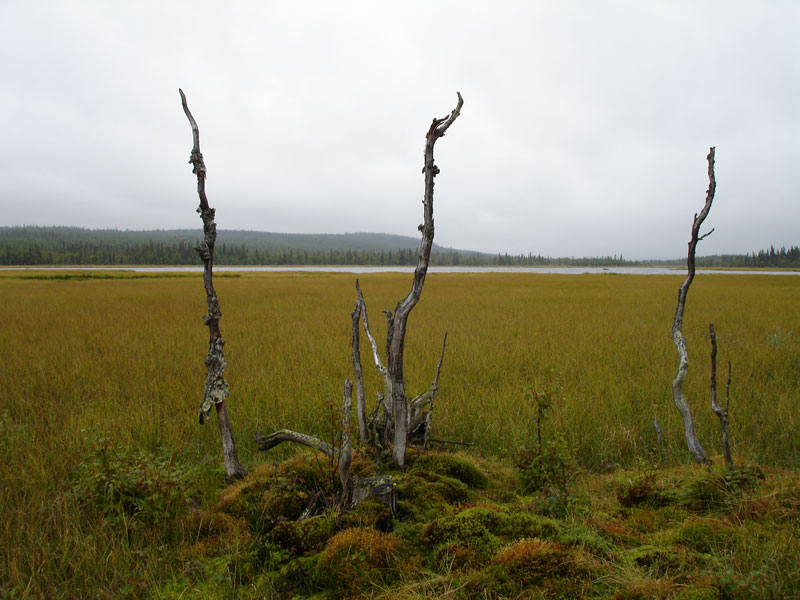
- Kroksjön near the village Kroksjö on Stöttingfjället in Lycksele municipality.

Highest point
- Elevation: 716 m (2,349 ft)
- Coordinates: 64°40′00″N 17°36′00″E

Geography
- Location within Sweden
- Location: Sweden

Geology
- Rock age: Paleoproterozoic

Stöttingfjället is a highland in Swedish Lapland. Geologically, the southeastern portion of Stöttingsfjället is interpreted as being a part of the Sub-Cambrian peneplain that have been uplifted by faults.
