= Territorial waters =

Coastal waters that are part of a sovereign state's sovereign territory

Maritime zones under international law

Territorial waters are informally an area of water where a sovereign state has jurisdiction, including internal waters, the territorial sea, the contiguous zone, the exclusive economic zone, and potentially the extended continental shelf (these components are sometimes collectively called the maritime zones). In a narrower sense, the term is often used as a synonym for the territorial sea.

Vessels have different rights and duties when passing through each area defined by the United Nations Convention on the Law of the Sea (UNCLOS), one of the most ratified treaties. States cannot exercise their jurisdiction in waters beyond the exclusive economic zone, which are known as the high seas.

== Baseline ==
Normally, the baseline is the low-water line along the coast as marked on large-scale charts that the coastal state recognizes. This is either the low-water mark closest to the shore or an unlimited distance from permanently exposed land, provided that some portion of elevations exposed at low tide but covered at high tide (such as mud flats) is within 3 nautical miles (5.6 kilometres; 3 1/2 statute miles) of permanently exposed land.

Straight baselines can alternatively be defined connecting fringing islands along a coast, across the mouths of rivers, or with certain restrictions across the mouths of bays. In this case, a bay is defined as "a well-marked indentation whose penetration is in such proportion to the width of its mouth as to contain land-locked waters and constitute more than a mere curvature of the coast. An indentation is not, however, regarded as a bay unless its area is as large as, or larger than, that of the semi-circle whose diameter is a line drawn across the mouth of that indentation". The baseline across the bay must also be no more than 24 nautical miles (44 kilometres; 28 statute miles) in length.

== Internal waters ==
Internal waters are landward of the baseline. The coastal state has sovereignty over internal waters, and can enforce domestic law on vessels in internal waters, including to prohibit innocent passage. Lakes, rivers and bays are considered internal waters.

"Archipelagic waters" within the outermost islands of an archipelagic state, such as Indonesia or the Philippines, are also internal waters, but the state must allow innocent passage through them. However, archipelagic states can limit innocent passage to designated sea lanes within these waters. Each island in the archipelago can have its own baseline.

== Territorial sea ==
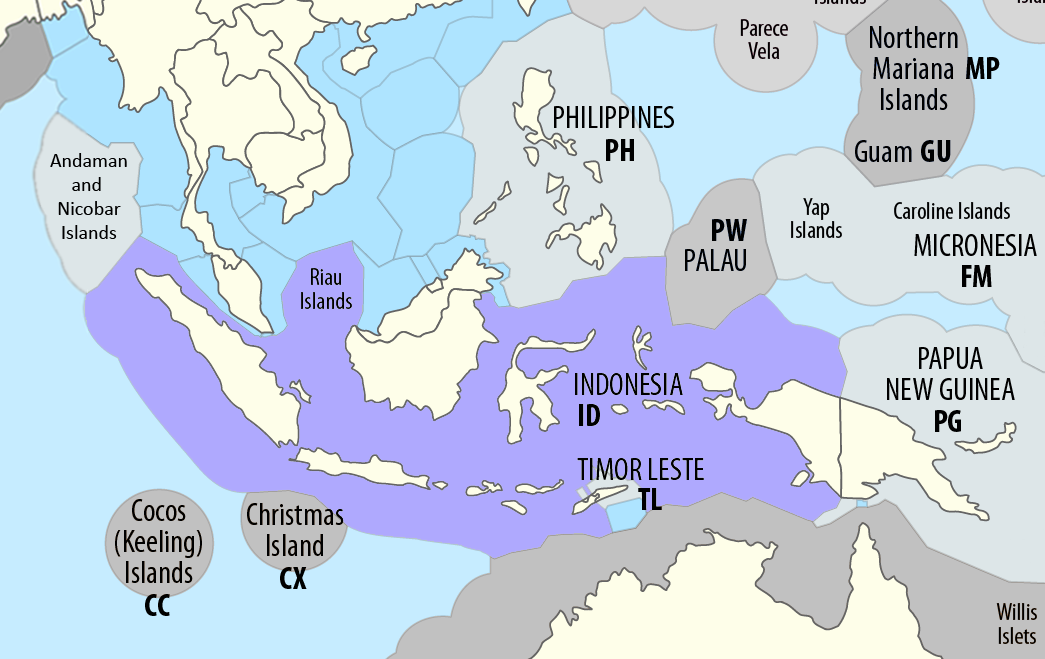
Maritime territory and exclusive economic zone of some Southeast Asia and Pacific countries

Territorial sea is a belt of sovereign water that extends at most 12 nautical miles (22 km; 14 mi) from the baseline of a coastal state, including the airspace over and seabed below it. Although the territorial sea is sovereign territory, foreign ships (military and civilian) are allowed innocent passage.

Boundaries can be adjusted through maritime delimitation. If the 12 nautical mile boundary of a state overlaps with the same boundary of another state, the border is taken as the median point between the states' baselines, unless they agree otherwise. A state can also choose to claim a smaller territorial sea.

Conflicts have occurred when a coastal nation claims an entire gulf as its territorial waters while other nations only recognize the more restrictive definitions of the UNCLOS. Claims that draw the baseline at more than 24 nautical miles (two 12 nm limits) are judged excessive by the US. Two conflicts occurred in the Gulf of Sidra where Libya drew a line in excess of 230 nmi (430 km; 260 mi) and claimed the entire enclosed gulf as its territorial waters. The US exercised freedom of navigation rights, resulting in the 1981 and 1989 Gulf of Sidra incidents.

== Contiguous zone ==
The contiguous zone is a band of water extending farther from the outer edge of the territorial sea to up to 24 nautical miles (44.4 km; 27.6 mi) from the baseline. Inside, a state can exercise limited control to prevent or punish "infringement of its customs, fiscal, immigration or sanitary laws and regulations within its territory or territorial sea".

The zone is typically 12 nautical miles (22 km; 14 mi) wide. However, it can be wider when a state claims a territorial sea of less than 12 nautical miles, or narrower if it would otherwise overlap with another state's contiguous zone. Unlike the territorial sea, there is no standard rule for resolving such conflicts and states must negotiate a compromise. The US invoked a contiguous zone out to 24 nmi from the baseline on 29 September 1999.

== Exclusive economic zone ==
The exclusive economic zone (EEZ) is a band of water extending from the outer edge of the territorial sea to up to 200 nautical miles (370.4 km; 230.2 mi) from the baseline and therefore includes the contiguous zone. A coastal nation has control of all economic resources inside its exclusive economic zone, including fishing, mining, oil exploration, and pollution of those resources. However, it cannot prohibit passage or loitering above, on, or under the surface of the sea that complies with the laws and regulations adopted by the coastal state in accordance with the provisions of the UN Convention, within that portion of its exclusive economic zone beyond its territorial sea.

Before the convention, coastal nations arbitrarily extended their territorial waters to attempt to control activities that are now regulated by the exclusive economic zone, such as offshore oil exploration or fishing rights (see Cod Wars).

The EEZ is still popularly, but incorrectly, regarded as coastal nation's territorial waters.

== Continental shelf ==
=== Definition ===
Article 76 of the UN convention defines the "continental shelf" of coastal countries.

A state's continental shelf extends to the outer edge of the continental margin but at least 200 nautical miles (370 km; 230 mi) from the baselines of the territorial sea if the continental margin does not stretch that far. Coastal states can explore and exploit the seabed and the natural resources on or beneath it. However, other states may lay cables and pipelines if authorized by the coastal state. The outer limit of a country's continental shelf cannot stretch beyond 350 nautical miles (650 km; 400 mi) of the baseline or beyond 100 nautical miles (190 km; 120 mi) from the 2,500 metres (8,200 ft) isobath, which is a line connecting the depths of the seabed at 2,500 meters.

The outer edge of the continental margin for the purposes of this article is defined as:

*a series of lines joining points not more than 60 nautical miles (110 km; 69 mi) apart where the thickness of sedimentary rocks is at least 1% of the height of the continental shelf above the foot of the continental slope; or
*a series of lines joining points not more than 60 nautical miles apart that is not more than 60 nautical miles from the foot of the continental margin.

The foot of the continental slope is determined as the point of maximum change in the gradient at its base.

=== Extended continental shelf ===
The portion of the continental shelf beyond the 200 nautical mile limit is also known as the "extended continental shelf". Countries wishing to delimit their outer continental shelf beyond 200 nautical miles have to submit scientific information for the basis of their claim to the UN Commission on the Limits of the Continental Shelf. The Commission then validates or makes recommendations on the scientific basis for the extended continental shelf claim. The scientific judgement of the Commission shall be final and binding. Validated extended continental shelf claims overlapping any demarcation between two or more parties are decided by bilateral or multilateral negotiation, not by the commission.

Countries have ten years after ratifying UNCLOS to lodge their submissions to extend their continental shelf beyond 200 nautical miles, or by 13 May 2009 for countries where the convention was ratified before 13 May 1999. As of 1 June 2009, 51 submissions have been lodged with the commission, of which eight have been deliberated by the commission and have had recommendations issued. The eight are (in the order of date of submission): Russian Federation; Brazil; Australia; Ireland; New Zealand; the joint submission by France, Ireland, Spain and the United Kingdom; Norway and Mexico.

=== Rights over the continental shelf ===
Articles 77 to 81 define the rights of a country over its continental shelf.

A coastal nation has control of all resources on or under its continental shelf, living or not, but no control over any living organisms above the shelf that are beyond its exclusive economic zone. This gives it the right to conduct hydrocarbon exploration and drilling works.

== Background ==
Territorial waters claims by coastal states in 1960
Breadth claim	Number of states
3-mile limit	26
4-mile limit	3
5-mile limit	1
6-mile limit	16
9-mile limit	1
10-mile limit	2
12-mile limit	34
More than 12 miles	9
Unspecified	11

Territorial Sea Act 1987
- Act of Parliament
- Parliament of the United Kingdom
- Long title: An Act to provide for the extent of the territorial sea adjacent to the British Islands.
- Citation: 1987 c. 49
- Territorial extent: England and Wales; Scotland; Northern Ireland; Jersey; Guernsey; Isle of Man

Dates
- Royal assent: 15 May 1987
- Commencement: 1 October 1987

Other legislation
- Amended by: Coal Industry Act 1994; Petroleum Act 1998; Finance Act 2006; Marine and Coastal Access Act 2009; Marine (Scotland) Act 2010; Marine Act (Northern Ireland) 2013

Status: Current legislation

Text of statute as originally enacted

Text of the Territorial Sea Act 1987 as in force today (including any amendments) within the United Kingdom, from legislation.gov.uk.

From the 18th century until the mid-20th century, the territorial waters of the British Empire, the United States, France and many other nations were three nautical miles (5.6 km) wide. Originally, this was the distance of a cannon shot, hence the portion of an ocean that a sovereign state could defend from shore. However, Iceland claimed two nautical miles (3.7 km), Norway and Sweden claimed four nautical miles (7.4 km), and Spain claimed six nautical miles (11 km) during this period. During incidents such as nuclear weapons testing and fisheries disputes some nations arbitrarily extended their maritime claims to as much as fifty nautical miles (93 km) or even two hundred nautical miles (370 km). Since the late 20th century the "12 mile limit" has become almost universally accepted. The United Kingdom extended its territorial waters from three to twelve nautical miles (5.6 to 22.2 km) by the Territorial Sea Act 1987 (c. 49).

During the League of Nations Codification Conference in 1930, the issue of establishing international legislation on territorial waters was raised, but no agreement was reached.

Claims by legislation to the adjacent continental shelf and fishing were first made by the United States government immediately following the Second World War. On 28 September 1945, US President Harry S. Truman issued two proclamations that established government control of natural resources in areas adjacent to the coastline. One of these proclamation was titled "Policy of the United States With Respect to the Natural Resources of the Subsoil and Sea Bed of the Continental Shelf", and stipulated in its operative clause:

the Government of the United States regards the natural resources of the subsoil and sea bed of the continental shelf beneath the high seas but contiguous to the coasts of the United States as appertaining to the United States, subject to its jurisdiction and control.

The second proclamation was titled "Policy of the United States With Respect to Coastal Fisheries in Certain Areas of the High Seas", and stated in its operative clause:

the Government of the United States regards it as proper to establish conservation zones in those areas of the high seas contiguous to the coasts of the United States wherein fishing activities have been or in the future may be developed and maintained on a substantial scale.

Following the US presidential proclamation, the issue of legally determining territorial waters by international agreement was raised, and in its first session in 1949, the International Law Commission of the United Nations added the subject to its agenda.

The important issue of the breadth of territorial waters could not be resolved at either the UNCLOS I (1956-1958) or UNCLOS II (1960) conferences, with neither the two major contenders of a 3-mile or 12-mile limit reaching the required two-thirds support. This lack of agreement had the potential to lead to serious international disputes. It was only at the UNCLOS III (1973-1982) conference, whose provisions did not come into force until 1994, that this issue was resolved at twelve nautical miles.

== Miscellaneous ==
Pirate radio broadcasting from artificial marine fixtures or anchored ships can be controlled by the affected coastal nation or other nations wherever that broadcast may originate, whether in the territorial sea, exclusive economic zone, the continental shelf or even on the high seas.

Thus a coastal nation has total control over its internal waters, slightly less control over territorial waters, and ostensibly even less control over waters within the contiguous zones. However, it has total control of economic resources within its exclusive economic zone as well as those on or under its continental shelf.

Throughout this article, distances measured in nautical miles are exact legal definitions, while those in kilometres are approximate conversions that are not stated in any law or treaty.

Federal nations, such as the United States, divide control over certain waters between the federal government and the individual states. (See tidelands.)

== Territorial sea claim ==
Maritime controversies involve two dimensions: (a) territorial sovereignty, which are a legacy of history; and (b) relevant jurisdictional rights and interests in maritime boundaries, which are mainly due to differing interpretations of the law of the sea.

- 6 nautical miles (11.1 km; 6.9 mi): Greece (in Aegean sea), Turkey (in Aegean sea)
- 12 nautical miles (22.2 km; 13.8 mi): Albania, Algeria, Angola, Antigua and Barbuda, Argentina, Australia, Bahamas, Bahrain, Bangladesh, Barbados, Belgium, Belize, Brazil, Brunei, Bouvet Island, Bulgaria, Cambodia, Cameroon, Canada, Cape Verde, Chile, People's Republic of China, Republic of China, Colombia, Comoros, Cook Islands, Costa Rica, Côte d'Ivoire, Croatia, Cuba, Cyprus, Democratic People's Republic of Korea, Democratic Republic of the Congo, Denmark, Djibouti, Dominica, Dominican Republic, Ecuador, Egypt, Equatorial Guinea, Eritrea, Estonia, Faroe Islands, Fiji, Finland, France, Gabon, Gambia, Georgia, Germany, Ghana, Greece (in Ionian sea), Grenada, Guatemala, Guinea, Guinea-Bissau, Guyana, Haiti, Honduras, Iceland, India, Indonesia, Iran, Iraq, Ireland, Israel, Jamaica, Japan, Jordan, Kenya, Kiribati, Kuwait, Latvia, Lebanon, Liberia, Libya, Lithuania, Madagascar, Malaysia, Maldives, Malta, Marshall Islands, Mauritania, Mauritius, Mexico, Micronesia, Monaco, Montenegro, Morocco, Mozambique, Myanmar, Namibia, Nauru, Netherlands, New Zealand, Nicaragua, Nigeria, Niue, Norway, Oman, Pakistan, Palau, Panama, Papua New Guinea, Poland, Portugal, Qatar, Republic of Korea, Romania, Russia, Saint Kitts and Nevis, Saint Lucia, Saint Vincent and the Grenadines, Samoa, São Tomé and Príncipe, Saudi Arabia, Senegal, Seychelles, Sierra Leone, Singapore, Solomon Islands, South Africa, Spain, Sri Lanka, Sudan, Suriname, Sweden, Syria, Thailand, Timor-Leste, Tonga, Trinidad and Tobago, Turkey (in Black sea and Mediterranean), Tuvalu, Ukraine, United Arab Emirates, United Kingdom, United Republic of Tanzania, United States, Uruguay, Vanuatu, Venezuela, Vietnam, Yemen.
- 12 nautical miles/DLM: (Note: DLM means that "the national legislation establishes the limits of a given zone only by reference to the delimitation of maritime boundaries with adjacent or opposite States, or to a median (equidistant) line in the absence of a maritime boundary delimitation agreement.") Slovenia.
- 13 nautical miles (24.08 km; 14.96 mi): Italy-Tunisia
- 15 nautical miles (27.78 km; 17.26 mi): Azerbaijan, Iran (Caspian Sea), Kazakhstan, Russia (Caspian Sea), Turkmenistan
- 30 nautical miles (55.6 km; 34.5 mi): Togo.
- 200 nautical miles (370.4 km; 230.2 mi): Benin, El Salvador, Peru, Somalia.

=== Special cases ===
- Australia: A treaty with Papua New Guinea defines the territorial sea boundaries between the islands of Aubusi, Boigu and Moimi and Papua New Guinea on the one hand and the islands of Dauan, Kaumag and Saibai and Papua New Guinea on the other hand, as well as a section of the border of the territorial sea of Saibai. The territorial seas of the islands known as Anchor Cay, Aubusi Island, Black Rocks, Boigu Island, Bramble Cay, Dauan Island, Deliverance Island, East Cay, Kaumag Island, Kerr Islet, Moimi Island, Pearce Cay, Saibai Island, Urnagain Island and Turu Cay do not extend beyond 3 nautical miles from the baselines.
- Belize: 3 nautical miles limit applies from the mouth of Sarstoon River to Ranguana Caye.
- Cameroon: See article 45 of Law 96-06 of 18 January 1996 on the revision of the Constitution of 2 June 1972.
- Denmark: Act No. 200 of 7 April 1999 on the delimitation of the territorial sea does not apply to the Faroe Islands (the act applies to the Faroe Islands from 1 June 2002) and Greenland but may become effective by Royal Decree for those parts of the Kingdom of Denmark with the amendments dictated by the special conditions prevailing in the Faroe Islands and Greenland. As far as Greenland is concerned, the outer limit of the external territorial waters may be measured at a distance shorter than 12 nautical miles (22.2 km; 13.8 mi) from the baselines.
- Estonia: In some parts of the Gulf of Finland, defined by coordinates.
- Finland: Extends, with certain exceptions, to 12 nautical miles (22.2 km; 13.8 mi), unless defined by geographical coordinates. In the Gulf of Finland, there is a strip of international waters regardless of the 12 nmi limit: the outer limit of the territorial sea shall at no place be closer to the midline than 3 nautical miles (5.6 km; 3.5 mi). Bogskär, a remote island, has only 3 nautical miles (5.6 km; 3.5 mi) territorial waters.
- Greece: 10 nautical miles (18.5 km; 11.5 mi) limit applies for the purpose of regulating civil aviation (See also Aegean dispute)
- India: 13 nautical miles (24.1 km; 15.0 mi) limit includes Andaman, Nicobar Lakshadweep and SriLanka.
- Japan: 3 nautical miles (5.6 km; 3.5 mi) limit applies to the Soya Strait, the Tsugaru Strait, the eastern and western channels of the Korea Strait and the Osumi Straits only.
- New Zealand: 12 nautical miles (22.2 km; 13.8 mi) limit includes Tokelau.
- Papua New Guinea: 3 nautical miles (5.6 km; 3.5 mi) in certain areas.

Peru claims territorial waters out to 200 nmi.

- Peru: The 200 nautical miles (370.4 km; 230.2 mi) territorial sea is called "Maritime Dominion" in article 54 of the 1993 Constitution: "... In its maritime dominion, Peru exercises sovereignty and jurisdiction, without prejudice to the freedoms of international communication, in accordance with the law and the treaties ratified by the State ..."
- The Philippines claims a rectangle, defined by coordinates; the total claim extends beyond 12 nautical miles.
- Turkey: 6 nautical miles (11.1 km; 6.9 mi) in the Aegean Sea, 12 nautical miles (22.2 km; 13.8 mi) in the Black and Mediterranean Seas.
- United Kingdom and British Crown: The limit remains at 3 nautical miles (5.6 km; 3.5 mi) in some of its overseas territories: British Indian Ocean Territory, Gibraltar, Montserrat and Pitcairn; the limit is now at 12 nautical miles (22.2 km; 13.8 mi) in the United Kingdom and its overseas territories of Anguilla, Bermuda, British Virgin Islands, Cayman Islands, Falkland Islands, Saint Helena, Ascension and Tristan da Cunha, South Georgia and the South Sandwich Islands, and Turks and Caicos Islands, as well as in the Crown Dependencies (i.e. Isle of Man and the Bailiwick of Jersey, and the Bailiwick of Guernsey).

== Contiguous zone claims ==
- None: Albania, the Bahamas, Barbados, Belize, Benin, Bosnia and Herzegovina, Brunei, Cameroon, Colombia, Comoros, Congo, Cook Islands, Costa Rica, Côte d'Ivoire, Croatia, Democratic Republic of the Congo, Ecuador, El Salvador, Equatorial Guinea, Eritrea, Estonia, Fiji, Georgia, Germany, Greece, Grenada, Guatemala, Guinea, Guinea-Bissau, Guyana, Iceland, Indonesia, Iran, Israel, Jordan, Kenya, Kiribati, Kuwait, Latvia, Lebanon, Libya, Lithuania, Macedonia, Malaysia, Mauritius, Micronesia, Monaco, Montenegro, Nigeria, Niue, Papua New Guinea, Peru, the Philippines, São Tomé and Príncipe, Singapore, Slovenia, Solomon Islands, Somalia, Suriname, Sweden, Togo, Tonga, Turkey, Ukraine, United Kingdom, Tanzania
- 14 nautical miles (25.9 km; 16.1 mi): Finland
- 15 nautical miles (27.8 km; 17.3 mi): Venezuela
- 18 nautical miles (33.3 km; 20.7 mi): Bangladesh, Gambia, Saudi Arabia, Sudan
- 24 nautical miles (44.4 km; 27.6 mi): Algeria, Angola, Antigua and Barbuda, Argentina, Australia, Belgium, Brazil, Bulgaria, Cambodia, Canada, Cape Verde, Chile, People's Republic of China, Cuba, Cyprus, Denmark, Djibouti, Dominica, Dominican Republic, Egypt, France, Gabon, Ghana, Haiti, Honduras, India, Iran, Ireland, Jamaica, Japan, Liberia, Madagascar, Maldives, Malta, Marshall Islands, Mauritania, Mexico, Morocco, Mozambique, Myanmar, Namibia, Nauru, The Netherlands, New Zealand, Nicaragua, Norway, Oman, Pakistan, Palau, Panama, Poland, Portugal, Qatar, Republic of Korea, Romania, Russia, Saint Kitts and Nevis, Saint Lucia, Saint Vincent and the Grenadines, Samoa, Senegal, Seychelles, Sierra Leone, South Africa, Spain, Sri Lanka, Syria, Thailand, Timor-Leste, Trinidad and Tobago, Tunisia, Tuvalu, United Arab Emirates, United States of America, Uruguay, Vanuatu, Vietnam, Yemen
- 30 nautical miles (55.6 km; 34.5 mi): Italy
- 50 nautical miles (92.6 km; 57.5 mi): Democratic People's Republic of Korea

== Extended continental shelf claims ==
As of 13 May 2009, 51 submissions by 44 countries have been lodged for claims over their extended continental shelf. Some countries have multiple submissions and joint submissions with other countries. Recommendations have been given for 8 of the submissions.

=== Submissions with recommendations ===
List with date of submission and adoption of recommendation by the Commission on the Limits of the Continental Shelf.

- United Kingdom – Ascension Island (submission: 9 May 2008; recommendation: 15 April 2010) (application to extend beyond 200NM failed)
- Australia (15 November 2004, 9 April 2008)
- Barbados (submission: 8 May 2008; recommendation: 15 April 2010)
- Brazil (17 May 2004, 4 April 2007)
- France – in respect of the areas of French Guiana and New Caledonia (22 May 2007, 2 September 2009)
- Joint submission by France, Ireland, Spain and the United Kingdom – in the area of the Celtic Sea and the Bay of Biscay (19 May 2006, 24 March 2009)
- Ireland – Porcupine Abyssal Plain (25 May 2005, 5 April 2007)
- Mexico – in respect of the western polygon in the Gulf of Mexico (13 December 2007, 31 March 2009)
- New Zealand (19 April 2006, 22 August 2008)
- Norway – in the North East Atlantic and the Arctic (27 November 2006, 27 March 2009)
- Russia (20 December 2001, 27 June 2002)

=== Other submissions ===
List in order of date of submission, with date of submission.

- Canada - Canada's Extended Continental Shelf Program (2003 - ongoing) to include Atlantic and Arctic Ocean as part of shelf the UN Commission on the Limits of the Continental Shelf (CLCS) including the North Pole
- France – areas of the French Antilles and the Kerguelen Islands (5 February 2009)
- Indonesia – North west of Sumatra Island (16 June 2008)
- Japan (12 November 2008)
- Joint submission by the Republic of Mauritius and the Republic of Seychelles – in the region of the Mascarene Plateau (1 December 2008)
- Suriname (5 December 2008)
- Myanmar (16 December 2008)
- Somalia (17 April 2009)
- Yemen – in respect of south east of Socotra Island (20 March 2009)
- United Kingdom – in respect of Hatton Rockall Area (31 March 2009)
- Ireland – in respect of Hatton-Rockall Area (31 March 2009)
- Uruguay (7 April 2009)
- Philippines – in the Benham Plateau region (8 April 2009)
- The Cook Islands – concerning the Manihiki Plateau (16 April 2009)
- Fiji (20 April 2009)
- Argentina (21 April 2009)
- Ghana (28 April 2009)
- Iceland – in the Ægir Basin area and in the western and southern parts of Reykjanes Ridge (29 April 2009)
- Denmark – in the area north of the Faroe Islands (29 April 2009)
- Pakistan (30 April 2009)
- Norway – in respect of Bouvetøya and Dronning Maud Land (4 May 2009)
- South Africa – in respect of the mainland of the territory of the Republic of South Africa (5 May 2009)
- Joint submission by the Federated States of Micronesia, Papua New Guinea and Solomon Islands – concerning the Ontong Java Plateau (5 May 2009)
- Joint submission by Malaysia and Viet Nam – in the southern part of the South China Sea (6 May 2009)
- Joint submission by France and South Africa – in the area of the Crozet Archipelago and the Prince Edward Islands (6 May 2009)
- Kenya (6 May 2009)
- Mauritius – in the region of Rodrigues Island (6 May 2009)
- Vietnam – in North Area (of the South China Sea) (7 May 2009)
- Nigeria (7 May 2009)
- Seychelles – concerning the Northern Plateau Region (7 May 2009)
- France – in respect of La Réunion Island and Saint-Paul and Amsterdam Islands (8 May 2009)
- Palau (8 May 2009)
- Côte d'Ivoire (8 May 2009)
- Sri Lanka (8 May 2009)
- Portugal (11 May 2009)
- United Kingdom – in respect of the Falkland Islands, and of South Georgia and the South Sandwich Islands (11 May 2009)
- Tonga (11 May 2009)
- Spain – in respect of the area of Galicia (11 May 2009)
- India (11 May 2009)
- Trinidad and Tobago (12 May 2009)
- Namibia (12 May 2009)
- Cuba (1 June 2009)
- Angola (6 December 2013)

== See also ==
- Aegean dispute
- Baseline (sea)
- Boundary delimitation
- Exclusive economic zone
- Freedom of navigation
- Freedom of the seas
- Internal waters
- International waters
- Intra fauces terra
- Littoral zone
- Maritime boundary
- Ocean colonization
- Territorial claims in the Arctic
- Territorial disputes in the South China Sea
