= Maritime territory =

Concept in international law

Maritime territory is a term used in international law to denote coastal waters which are not Territorial Waters though in immediate contact with the sea. In the case of Territorial Waters, the dominion of the adjacent state is subject to a limitation. Dominion over maritime territory is not subject to any limitation. Thus any strait through which the right of passage of foreign vessels can be forbidden, or bays so land-locked that they cannot be held to form part of any ocean-highway, are maritime territory.

== See also ==
- International waters
- Territorial waters
