= Kilpisjärvi =

Kilpisjärvi (Finnish) Gilbbesjávri (Northern Sami)
- Village
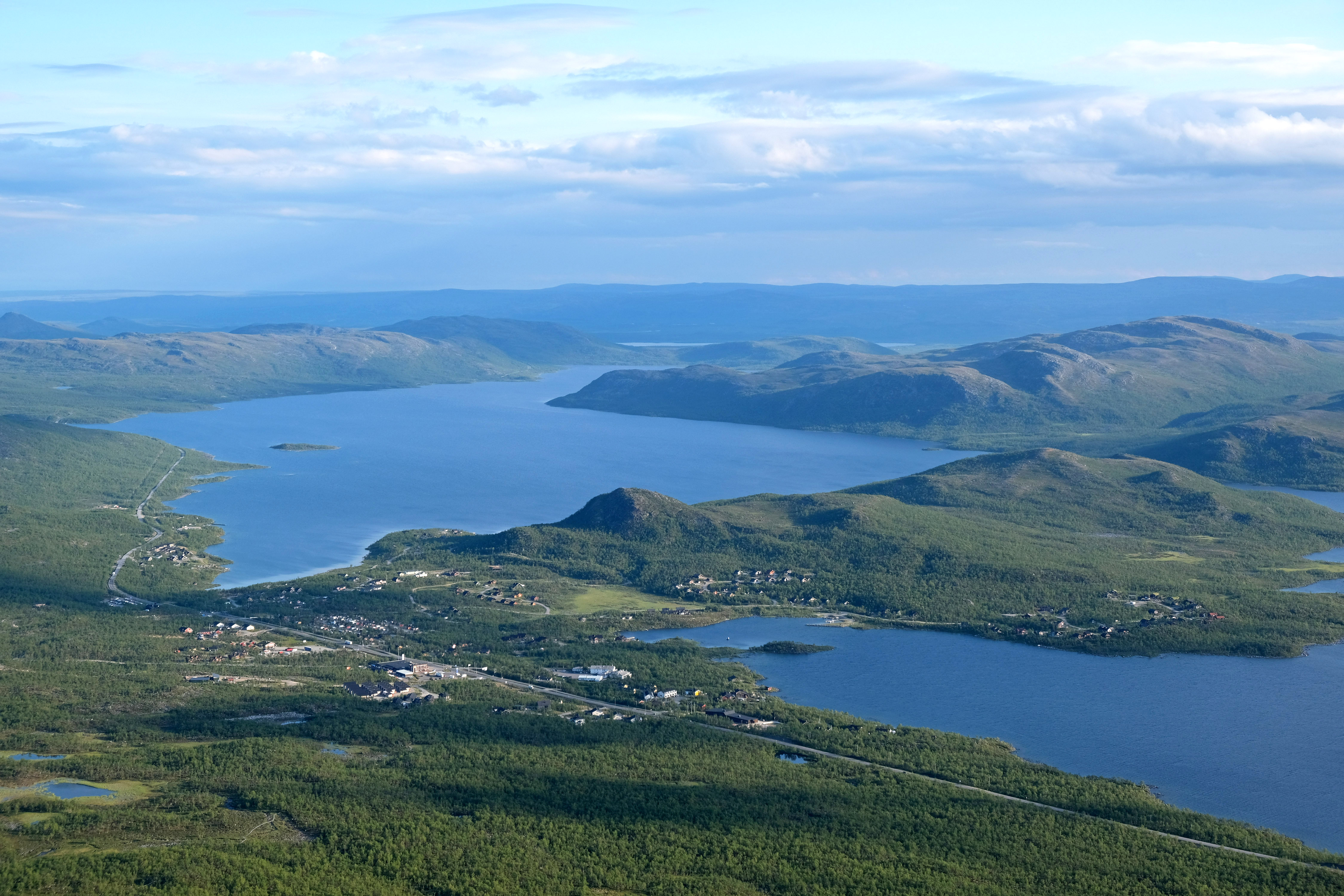
- Kilpisjärvi village seen from Saana fell.

- Location in Finland
- Coordinates: 69°02′50″N 20°47′50″E
- Country: Finland
- Region: Lapland
- Municipality: Enontekiö

Population (2000)
  - Total: 114
- Time zone: UTC+2 (EET)
  - Summer (DST): UTC+3 (EEST)

Kilpisjärvi (Finnish: [ˈkilpisjærʋi]; Northern Sami: Gilbbesjávri [ˈkilpːesˌjaːvːriː]) is a village in the municipality of Enontekiö, Lapland, Finland. It is located in Finland's northwestern "arm" near the northwesternmost point of the country.

Although Kilpisjärvi is one of the largest villages in Enontekiö, it is still quite small. In 2000 its population was recorded as 114. Like most Sami villages, Kilpisjärvi is built mainly around one major road, Käsivarrentie, or the "Arm Road" and Neljäntuulentie, or the "Four Winds' Road" — also known as E8. Near Kilpisjärvi is the highest point of Finnish road network, at an elevation of 565.8 m.

Kilpisjärvi has its own school and a hotel, and the northernmost research station of the University of Helsinki is situated there, as well as the KAIRA research facility. The best-known tourist attractions in Kilpisjärvi are the Saana fell and the "three-country border point", a monument at the common border point of Finland, Sweden and Norway, located at approximately 69°03′36″N 20°32′56″E, roughly 2.5 km northwest from the end of Lake Kilpisjärvi. Over the lake, Sweden is within viewing distance of the village, and by road, Norway is less than 10 kilometres (6.2 mi) to the north. During the winter, there are about four times more Norwegian tourists living in Kilpisjärvi than Finnish permanent residents, as Norwegians are attracted by the lower prices and more relaxed rules for snowmobiling, which is generally prohibited in Northern Norway.

In the music video for Röyksopp's Poor Leno, Leno's place of origin is listed as Kilpisjärvi.

== 2015 school fire ==
The building of the Kilpisjärvi school burned down on 3 May 2015. It had been occupied by travellers at the time. The fire started from a recreational vehicle parked next to the building.

The fire destroyed thousands of euros worth of euro banknotes that had been stored at the school. The money had been collected as donations to fund a study trip for the school's pupils, but had been stored at the school because the school staff had been unable to find a bank office capable of depositing the money to the school's bank account. The nearest office of Nordea, where the school had an account, capable of accepting cash deposits was in Rovaniemi, 440 km away from Kilpisjärvi. Nordea pledged to donate 4000 euros to the school as reimbursement for the lost money.

== Climate ==
Kilpisjärvi has a subarctic climate (Köppen climate classification: Dfc), with only two months above the 10 °C (50 °F) threshold. Summertime is typically cool and rainy with crisp nights. Winter is very long, cold, and snowy. It typically begins during October and lasts into May most years.

Climate data for Enontekiö Kilpisjärvi (1991–2020 normals, extremes 1959–present)
Month	Jan	Feb	Mar	Apr	May	Jun	Jul	Aug	Sep	Oct	Nov	Dec	Year
Record high °C (°F)	7.2 (45.0)	6.7 (44.1)	8.2 (46.8)	12.7 (54.9)	26.1 (79.0)	26.7 (80.1)	28.3 (82.9)	27.2 (81.0)	20.2 (68.4)	12.9 (55.2)	10.7 (51.3)	7.0 (44.6)	28.3 (82.9)
Mean maximum °C (°F)	2.1 (35.8)	2.1 (35.8)	3.6 (38.5)	7.5 (45.5)	14.0 (57.2)	20.3 (68.5)	23.0 (73.4)	21.4 (70.5)	16.1 (61.0)	9.1 (48.4)	4.2 (39.6)	3.4 (38.1)	24.1 (75.4)
Mean daily maximum °C (°F)	−7.7 (18.1)	−7.9 (17.8)	−4.2 (24.4)	0.9 (33.6)	6.2 (43.2)	12.2 (54.0)	16.2 (61.2)	14.3 (57.7)	9.1 (48.4)	2.0 (35.6)	−3.2 (26.2)	−5.8 (21.6)	2.7 (36.8)
Daily mean °C (°F)	−12.2 (10.0)	−12.3 (9.9)	−8.8 (16.2)	−3.5 (25.7)	2.3 (36.1)	7.7 (45.9)	11.6 (52.9)	10.1 (50.2)	5.7 (42.3)	−0.5 (31.1)	−6.5 (20.3)	−10.1 (13.8)	−1.4 (29.5)
Mean daily minimum °C (°F)	−17.3 (0.9)	−17.4 (0.7)	−14.1 (6.6)	−8.3 (17.1)	−1.4 (29.5)	3.8 (38.8)	7.9 (46.2)	6.8 (44.2)	2.9 (37.2)	−3.0 (26.6)	−10.0 (14.0)	−14.7 (5.5)	−5.4 (22.3)
Mean minimum °C (°F)	−33.0 (−27.4)	−32.1 (−25.8)	−29.1 (−20.4)	−22.8 (−9.0)	−9.6 (14.7)	−0.8 (30.6)	2.7 (36.9)	0.7 (33.3)	−3.1 (26.4)	−11.7 (10.9)	−22.3 (−8.1)	−29.3 (−20.7)	−36.0 (−32.8)
Record low °C (°F)	−44.2 (−47.6)	−47.2 (−53.0)	−38.2 (−36.8)	−33.0 (−27.4)	−22.0 (−7.6)	−4.7 (23.5)	−1.0 (30.2)	−4.7 (23.5)	−10.5 (13.1)	−26.5 (−15.7)	−34.6 (−30.3)	−40.2 (−40.4)	−47.2 (−53.0)
Average precipitation mm (inches)	52 (2.0)	39 (1.5)	37 (1.5)	27 (1.1)	28 (1.1)	49 (1.9)	73 (2.9)	50 (2.0)	38 (1.5)	37 (1.5)	36 (1.4)	49 (1.9)	516 (20.3)
Average precipitation days (≥ 1 mm)	11	10	8	6	7	8	10	8	8	9	9	11	105
Source 1: FMI
Source 2: FMI open data
