= Ostrobothnian Plain =

Large lowland in Finland

The Ostrobothnian Plain or Pohjanmaa is a large lowland in Finland along the Bothnian Sea being arguably the largest plain in the Nordic countries. The plain is made up smaller individual sand and clay plains alternated with rivers and peat bogs. It extends as a 100 km wide and 257 km long belt along the northwestern coast of Finland. The plain is extremely flat with height differences never exceeding 50 m.

Geologically the plain is a continuation of the Sub-Cambrian peneplain found across much of Fennoscandia.
