= Lätäseno =

Coordinates: 68°29′N 22°18′E

Location
- Country: Finland

Physical characteristics
- Length: 100 km (62 mi)

Lätäseno Leahttáseatnu (Northern Sami), is a river of Finland in Finnish Lapland. It is a tributary of Muonio River, which itself is a tributary of Torne River. The river is a popular fishing destination. It flows through the Lätäseno-Hietajoki wetland protection area. It is also part of the Poroeno-Lätäseno canoe route (which begins in the Käsivarsi Wilderness Area), and offers lean-to shelter and wilderness hut accommodation.

== See also ==
- List of rivers in Finland
