= Saana =

Mountain in Enontekiö municipality, Finland

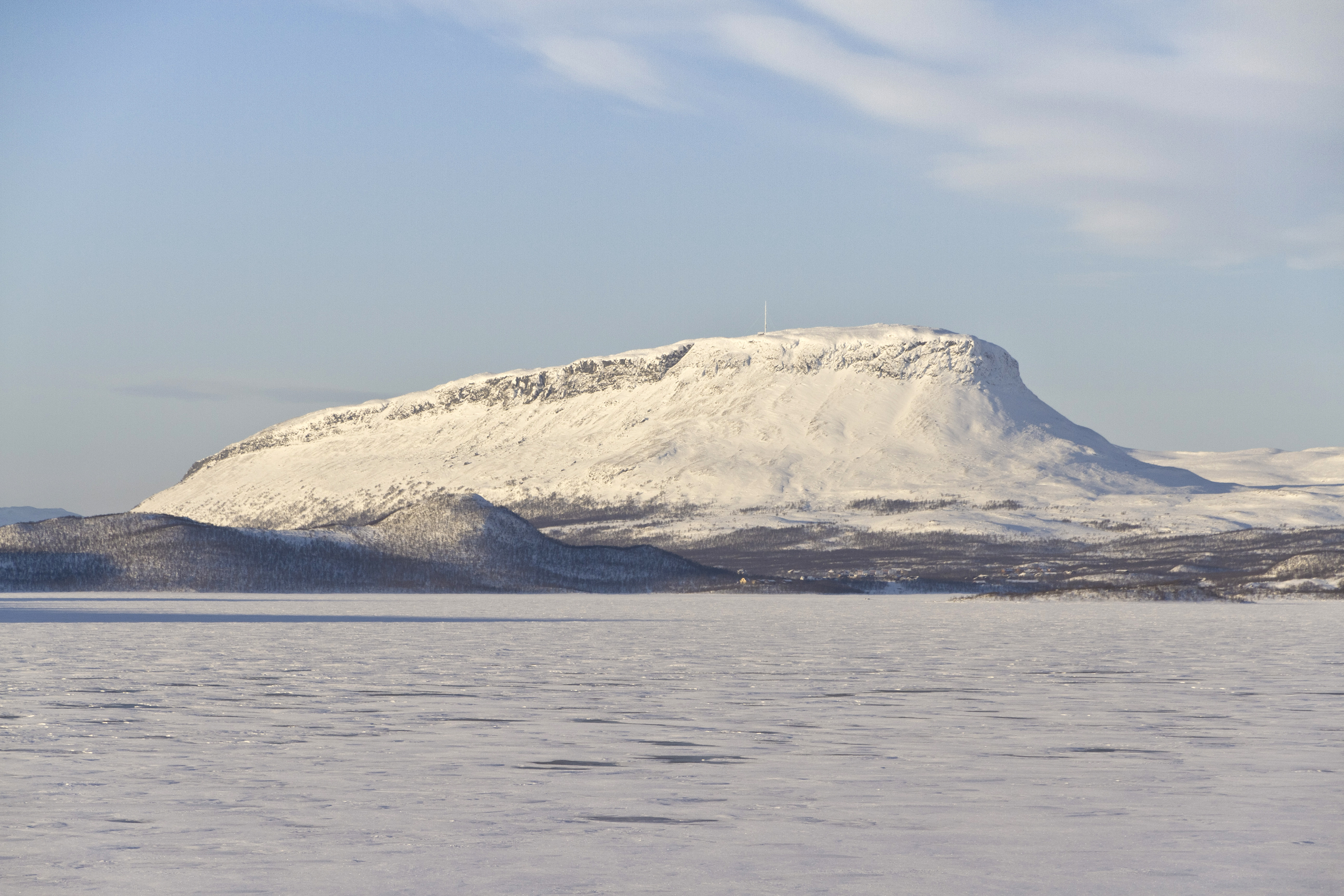
- Saana as seen from Lake Kilpisjärvi

Highest point
- Elevation: 1,029 m (3,376 ft)
- Coordinates: 69°02′37″N 20°51′22″E

Geography
- Location within Finland
- Location: Enontekiö, Finland
- Parent range: Scandinavian Mountains

Saana (Northern Sami: Sána) is a fell in Enontekiö, Finland. Saana's summit lies 1,029 metres (3,376 ft) above sea level and 556 m (1,824 ft) above the adjacent Kilpisjärvi lake. Geologically it is part of the Scandinavian Mountains, and is made of the same kinds of schist and gneiss rock. The peak is a popular destination for hikers and backpackers because of the sweeping views offered at the summit.

In December 2017, in celebration of the 100th anniversary of Finland's independence, Saana was lit with blue light. The area illuminated covered roughly 2.5 million square meters, making it the largest art illumination in the world.

== Climate ==
Saana has a tundra climate (ET) with all months having a mean temperature below 10 °C (50 °F).

Climate data for Enontekiö Kilpisjärvi Saana (1991–2020 normals, extremes 1993– present)
Month	Jan	Feb	Mar	Apr	May	Jun	Jul	Aug	Sep	Oct	Nov	Dec	Year
Record high °C (°F)	3.6 (38.5)	4.7 (40.5)	4.8 (40.6)	10.5 (50.9)	21.2 (70.2)	22.8 (73.0)	24.8 (76.6)	23.9 (75.0)	16.6 (61.9)	12.6 (54.7)	9.6 (49.3)	3.2 (37.8)	24.8 (76.6)
Daily mean °C (°F)	−10.6 (12.9)	−11.3 (11.7)	−9.6 (14.7)	−6.2 (20.8)	−1.3 (29.7)	4.2 (39.6)	8.4 (47.1)	6.9 (44.4)	2.3 (36.1)	−3.5 (25.7)	−7.0 (19.4)	−9.2 (15.4)	−3.1 (26.4)
Record low °C (°F)	−30.2 (−22.4)	−32.0 (−25.6)	−21.6 (−6.9)	−19.2 (−2.6)	−13.1 (8.4)	−7.7 (18.1)	−2.2 (28.0)	−4.7 (23.5)	−7.8 (18.0)	−15.1 (4.8)	−25.2 (−13.4)	−24.8 (−12.6)	−32.0 (−25.6)
Source 1: FMI normals 1991-2020
Source 2: Record highs and lows 1993- present
