= Mira Jalosuo =

Finnish ice hockey player and coach

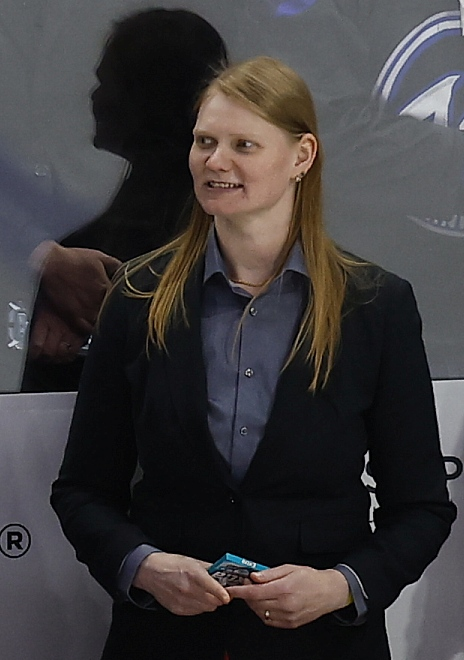
- Born: 3 February 1989 (age 37) Lieksa, Finland
- Height: 184 cm (6 ft 0 in)
- Weight: 84 kg (185 lb; 13 st 3 lb)
- Position: Defense
- Shot: Right
- Played for: Oulun Kärpät; Minnesota Whitecaps; Luleå HF/MSSK; SKIF Nizhny Novgorod; Minnesota Golden Gophers
- Current WCHA coach: St. Cloud State Huskies
- Coached for: Minnesota Frost; St. Cloud State Huskies; PWHPA Minnesota; Stillwater Ponies; Hamline Pipers; Wayzata Trojans
- National team: Finland
- Playing career: 2005–2018
- Coaching career: 2017–present
Medal record
Olympic Games
Bronze medal – third place	2018 Pyeongchang	Ice hockey
World Championship
Bronze medal – third place	2017 United States
Bronze medal – third place	2015 Sweden
Bronze medal – third place	2011 Switzerland
Bronze medal – third place	2009 Finland
Bronze medal – third place	2008 China
Universiade
Bronze medal – third place	2009 Harbin	Ice hockey

Mira Jalosuo (born 3 February 1989) is a Finnish ice hockey player and head coach for the St. Cloud State women's ice hockey team. She previously served as an assistant coach to the Minnesota Frost of the Professional Women's Hockey League (PWHL). As a member of the Finnish national team, she won a bronze medal at the 2018 Winter Olympic Games and five bronze medals at the IIHF Women's World Championship.

Jalosuo attended the University of Minnesota and played NCAA Division I ice hockey with the Minnesota Golden Gophers from 2009 until her graduation in 2013. She was one of the first European players to join the team and recorded 19 goals and 37 assists (56 points) during her collegiate career. In her post-collegiate and professional playing career, she played with SKIF Nizhny Novgorod of the Russian Women's Hockey League, Luleå HF/MSSK of the Swedish Riksserien, Oulun Kärpät of the Finnish Naisten Liiga, and the Minnesota Whitecaps.

== Playing career ==
When she was in fifth grade, she began playing organized hockey with the local club, Lieksan Hurtat, where, at the encouragement of her coaches and teammates, she played on both the girls' and boys' teams.

Motivated to further improve her game, she moved to Oulu at age fifteen and joined Oulun Kärpät of the Naisten SM-sarja (NSMs; renamed Naisten Liiga—NSML in 2017 and Auroraliiga in 2024). With Kärpät, she won Finnish Championship silver medals in 2006 and 2007, and bronze medals in 2005 and 2008 and was named to the SM-sarja All-Star Team in 2007 and 2008. Jalosuo served as team captain for the 2008–09 season.

During her time living in Oulu, Jalosuo also played with the Finnish senior national team, playing in four IIHF World Championship tournaments, including every championship game in 2008 and 2009.

When asked to reflect on this period, Jalosuo has said, “I would say that I was a very good locker room player who treated everyone fairly. On the ice I had a pretty good shot, and I was able to read the game well.”

Jalosuo was recruited by multiple NCAA Division I women's ice hockey teams as her 2009 graduation from secondary school approached. She toured Ohio State University, the University of Minnesota Duluth, and the University of Minnesota, ultimately deciding to attend the University of Minnesota.

=== University of Minnesota ===
Jalosuo and her college roommate, Finnish goaltender Noora Räty, became the first European players to join the Gophers. She played in 37 games during her 2009–10 freshman season, recording one goal and five assists, with a +4 rating. She scored her first collegiate point when she assisted on Chelsey Jones' goal against Syracuse Orange on 4 October 2009. She missed three games in January to play for Finland at the Meco Cup in Germany. Jalouso scored her first collegiate goal in an 8–5 win over Minnesota State during the first round of the Western Collegiate Hockey Association (WCHA) playoffs on 26 February. She was the last player cut from the Finnish roster for the 2010 Winter Olympics, which she called "a turning point in my life and hockey career" that made her more determined to make a future Olympic team.

During her 2010–11 sophomore season, Jalosuo was a WCHA All-Academic Team honoree and letterwinner. She played all 38 games of the season and recorded four goals (all on the power play and eight assists, with a +9 rating. Paired with Anne Schleper, Jalosuo had two multi-point games, scored her first assist of the season against St. Cloud State on 22 October, and scored game-winning goals in both games against the Harvard Crimson on 26 and 28 November. She also set up Terry Kelly's goal in the 4–2 victory over Minnesota Duluth in a WCHA semi-final game on 4 March.

During her 2011–12 junior season, Jalosuo was an Academic All-WCHA and scored a total of three goals and six assists, netting her first goal of the season in a 4–0 win over Syracuse on 1 October. She scored one assist each during the WCHA first round and semi-finals, and had a +3 rating during a 5–1 NCAA quarterfinal win over North Dakota on 10 March.

In her 2011–12 senior season, Jalosuo recorded a career-high 30 points, with 11 goals and 19 assists over all 41 games of the season, for a +38 rating. Four of her goals were game-winners, and she was named to the All-WCHA Third Team and the All-WCHA Academic Team. She scored a goal in each of the games of the opening series against Colgate on 28 and 29 September, and had two-point streaks during the season, recording six assists and one goal between 12 and 20 October, and five assists and one goal between 2 and 16 February. She scored a goal in the 5–0 shutout over Bemidji State in the WCHA first round on 1 March, as well as a goal against Ohio State on 8 March in the WCHA semi-finals. Jalosuo assisted Terry Kelly on the game-winning goal in their triple-overtime victory over North Dakota on 16 March in the NCAA quarterfinals, and recorded the first goal of the National Championship game against Boston University on 24 March. During her four years on the team, Jalosuo scored a total of 57 points, with 19 goals and 37 assists over 152 games.

=== Elite club play ===
Jalouso played with SKIF Nizhny Novgorod of the Russian Women's Hockey League for the 2013–14 and 2014–15 seasons. She won the Russian Championship with the team in 2014. Her teammates from the Finnish national team, Karoliina Rantamäki and goaltenders Noora Räty and Meeri Räisänen, also played with SKIF for one or both of the seasons that Jalouso was with the team.

In the 2015–16 season, Jalouso played with Luleå HF in the Swedish Women's Hockey League (SDHL). She played only three regular season games with the team but managed to record two goals and five assists for seven points in that short span. With Luleå, she played in seven playoff games and contributed five points (3+2) to the team's Swedish Championship victory in 2016. Michelle Karvinen and Nora Tallus, teammates from the Finnish national team, also played with Luleå in that season.

Jalouso returned to the Twin Cities, her college stomping grounds, to play with the Minnesota Whitecaps for the 2016–17 and 2017–18 seasons. The Whitecaps were independent in those seasons and played the majority of their games against women's college squads.

The Whitecaps’ non-standard schedule allowed Jalouso to play some regular-season games with Oulun Kärpät, the team she had played with in Finland prior to her collegiate career, in the 2016–17 and 2017–18 seasons. She also played with Kärpät in the 2017 Finnish Championship and contributed ten points (5+5) in eight games, leading to the team's Aurora Borealis Cup victory. Her efforts earned her the Karoliina Rantamäki Award as the most valuable player of the Naisten SM-Liiga playoffs.

== Coaching career ==
Jalosuo began her coaching career while still an active player, joining both the Hamline Pipers women's ice hockey program of Hamline University and the ice hockey program at Wayzata High School in Plymouth, Minnesota as an assistant coach in 2015. She retained both positions for four seasons.

She was named head coach of the Stillwater Ponies girls' ice hockey team of Stillwater Area High School in Oak Park Heights, Minnesota in 2019. Across her three seasons with the team, the Ponies achieved a record of 64–20–4, boasted a penalty kill success rate of 89.3%, and claimed three consecutive conference championship titles. In addition to her head coaching duties with the Ponies, she also worked as an assistant coach with the Minnesota section of the Professional Women's Hockey Players Association (PWHPA) during the 2020–21 season.

Ahead of the 2022–23 season, she accepted an assistant coaching position with the St. Cloud State women's ice hockey program. Joining the staff of incoming head coach Brian Idalski, her primary focus was working with the team's defenders. In her first season with the team, the Huskies' penalty kill improved from a 77% mark to 86% season over season, and they led the NCAA and set a program record with 576 blocked shots.

Jalosuo served as an assistant coach for two seasons (2023–24 and 2024–25) with the Minnesota Frost in the PWHL, winning two Walter Cups. After Idalski was appointed the head coach of PWHL Vancouver, Jalosuo was appointed the new head coach for the St. Cloud State women's hockey program.

== Personal life ==
Jalosuo was born on 3 February 1989 to Aki-Pekka and Sirpa Jalosuo, and raised in Lieksa, a small town of less than 12,000 on the Finland–Russia border in the North Karelia region of Finland . After moving to Oulu at age 15 to play in the Naisten SM-sarja, she lived with two of her Kärpät teammates and attended the high school at the Kastellin monitoimitalo, one of Finland's best public centers for primary and secondary education.

She holds a bachelor's degree in chemistry from the University of Minnesota and a degree in forensic science from Hamline University.

Jalosuo and her wife, Emilee (née Burkhalter), were married in April 2016. Their first child was born in 2021. Emilee played semi-professional rugby with the Twin Cities Gemini.

She is the owner and president of the Minnesota Ice Cougars, a women's junior ice hockey club that she purchased in 2018. Based in Roseville, Minnesota, the club has teams in the 14U, 16U, and 19U age groups; the Minnesota Ice Cougars 19U AAA team plays in the USA Hockey Tier 1 U19 league.

In 2021, Pasi Mustonen, head coach of the Finnish women's national team, sparked controversy when he suggested in an interview that Noora Räty may have broken the law by not attending a national team training camp in preparation for the 2021 IIHF Women's World Championship. Jalosuo was one of a small number of former national team players to speak to the media about the incident and she assessed Mustonen's behaviour as unprofessional, felt it showed a lack of respect for the players, and she further emphasized that if a coach at her hockey company were to make similar comments, they would be immediately fired.
