= Simon Affleck =

Swedish tax official

Major Simon Affleck (ca. 1660 in Narva, present-day Estonia – 9 May 1725 in Pielisjärvi, present-day Finland) was a Swedish tax official, of Scottish descent, who worked in then Swedish-ruled Finland. He is remembered in Finnish folk tradition as having been merciless and cruel.

He had been appointed by the King of Sweden to collect taxes in the Pielisjärvi region (now known as Lieksa), and also paid the rent of his mansion in Pielisjärvi to the King. Numerous groups of peasants rebelled against him, especially during the Great Famine (1695 to 1697) and the Great Northern War (1700-1721), as he did not grant any mercy in the taxation of peasants even in poor times. During the Great Northern War Affleck also had military duties.

His probable grandfather Hillebrand or Gilbert Affleck was born in Scotland and was a burgess in Turku and inspector of gunpowder factories.

Affleck is said to have been a ruthless collector of taxes with little pity towards the poor Finnish peasants. This, and the large and ferocious dog he kept as a pet, earned him the nickname Simo Hurtta (hurtta is Finnish for hound).

Affleck died in 1725 after the Greater Wrath.

In folk stories, where Affleck is known by the names Simo Hurtta and Aplekki, his evilness and cruelty has often been exaggerated. He is said to have shot himself in the head in his mansion to deny the Finnish peasants raiding his mansion the satisfaction of killing him, or to have been killed by the peasants. In later times, numerous novels, plays and films about "Simo Hurtta" have been written.

== Biography ==
=== Family ===
The Affleck family originally came from Scotland and had settled in Sweden during the 17th century. From the 1640s to the 1670s Simon Affleck's father Thomas Affleck served in the office of the Governor-General of Narva as a translator and interpreter of Russian. The name of Simon Affleck's mother is not known. Affleck probably grew up with his parents in Narva.

In the late 1690s, Affleck apparently married Anna Herkepaea, whose father was Pehr Herkepaeus, a dean who deeply hated Affleck. Anna was a member of the Herkepeaus family. Five of their children are known by name. Affleck is also known to have two illegitimate children, possibly even more. According to one document, Anna Herkepaea died in 1699, in which case Affleck would also have had another wife, as he is known to still have had more children in 1710, but this might also be the result of confusion.

=== Becoming a tax collector ===
After the Great Reduction, in the 1680s the Crown in Sweden externalised the task of collecting tax in many of the areas that were returned to Sweden, especially in the sparsely populated outer regions, allowing private persons to rent the right to collect taxes in the area. The rent of the right amounted to the total amount of taxes normally collected in the area. Tax renters also received the right to oversee lots in the area, giving them the right to expel peasants and regulate farming. They could also start to collect extraneous taxes. From 1689, Affleck worked as the tax collector for the tax renter Salomon Ehnberg, already becoming hated by the local residents. After working for Ehnberg, Affleck became the tax renter in Pielisjärvi himself in 1695. Affleck used his right to join peasants' lots into estates and founded courts for himself in Lieksa and Nurmes. He had good connection over the country border to Russian Karelia and he traded huge amounts of goods over the border.

Already in Ehnberg's time, the peasants in Pielisjärvi tried in vain to complain about their treatment to the authorities. In Affleck's time the situation became even worse, as there was a time of great famine from 1696 to 1697, called the Great Famine, but Affleck still tried to collect the full amount of taxes from the peasants without granting them mercy. When he arrived in autumn 1696 to collect taxes in Haapajärvi (now known as Valtimo) the angry peasants expelled his officials by force. When Affleck returned to the same village after a year he got into two armed ambushes, which he escaped with minor injuries. In December 1697 the peasants raided the Nurmes court and also tried to attack the Lieksa court, which Affleck defended with 14 men. After receiving help from the military he had the rebel leaders imprisoned, of which ten were sentenced to death and brought to Kexholm (Finnish: Käkisalmi) to be executed. However their complaints about the activity of tax renters was heard and the matter was investigated.

=== The Great Northern War and later times ===
After the start of the Great Northern War in 1700 Affleck was made the town lieutenant in Pielisjärvi and he repaired the Lieksa fortress. In 1704 he bought the Turunkorva mansion, one of the largest houses in Sotkamo, with a total land area of 2 thousand hectares. In order to live there in peace with his family he stopped collecting taxes from the peasants in the lots neighbouring his estate. In March 1709 Affleck was appointed the major of the county of Kajana. In the next year he evacuated his possessions to Turunkorva in Ostrobothnia County as a safety measure. There was a reason for this: there was a peace with the Russians in the Pielisjärvi area, but during the new harsh winter from 1708 to 1709 peasants dissatisfied with Affleck went on a raid over the border to Russia in order to aggravate the Russians to raid Affleck's courts. When this did not happen, the peasants rebelled again in 1710. Affleck narrowly escaped again and fled to Lieksa. When the Russians shortly arrived, the peasants aided by the dean Herkepaeus swore loyalty to the Emperor of Russia and raided the Nurmes court again. Affleck reconquered it with 30 soldiers, but could no longer move safely in the area, especially after the soldiers left.

During the so-called "field war" (Finnish: sarkasota) in March 1712 the Russians and the Nurmes peasants who had joined them burned down the Turunkorva mansion on the raid and took Affleck's wife and children as prisoners. Affleck himself was not present at the time. Four of the children managed to escape captivity from Russia after the end of the Great Wrath, but the fate of Affleck's wife is not known. There is also no record of Affleck's activity or place of residence during the Great Wrath, but he is known to have returned after the Treaty of Nystad and having had the Turunkorva mansion rebuilt. He had lost some of his power as the rights of tax renters had been limited to the actual tax collection only. Affleck sold the Turunkorva mansion in 1724. According to hereditary information, he would have shot himself on the cable ferry of the Lieksanjoki river in the next year. Most of his lands were sold soon after his death, but the Lieksa court remained in the possession of his son Carl until 1736.

Stefan Löfving served under Affleck from 1708 to January 1711. Löfving took care of the Suorlahti mansion in Kitee. There is a silver neck shield at the National Museum of Finland donated in 1858 by the later owners of the Turunkorva mansion, which is thought of having belonged to Affleck.

== Later reputation ==
Much hereditary information and stories have survived in eastern Finland about Affleck, deeply hated by the Finnish people at his time, vividly describing his mercilessness, evilness and eagerness to humiliate the Finnish people. These "Simo Hurtta" stories probably have little in common with the real history. Simo Hurtta is said to have taken peasants as his slaves and killed or maimed them. According to many stories he was a hedonist who demanded a constant supply of women. He is said to have used the droit du seigneur. He is also said of have demanded payment of tax in forms that were impossible in practice, for example as a barrel full of ruffe roe or as a bag full of dead mosquitoes.

Many different versions of Simo Hurtta's violent death at the hands of Finnish peasants seeking revenge appear in stories: according to one story he was stoned to death, according to another he was buried alive under a pile of rocks and left there. According to yet another story he was "walled in" with sand up to his neck in a hole dug in boulder soil on an island in the lake Nuasjärvi in Sotkamo, now known as Muuraussaari. Archeological diggings on the island have found human bones, but these have not been Affleck's.

In folk stories from the Kainuu region Affleck is known as Simo Hurtta, while in stories from Karelia he is known by other names, such as Aplekki. The origin of the name Simo Hurtta probably was that he was said to have kept a large dog as a pet. Another explanation is that it referred to his fearsome nature. The character paha pajari (Finnish for "the evil boyar") in folk tradition from the Kitee area was possibly also influenced by Affleck.

Finnish historians became interested in Affleck in the late 19th century when there was need for more reliable information in addition to folk stories.

== In art and culture ==
Affleck has often appeared in literature. In 1897 Anni Kepplerus published a historical novel Hovin Inkeri about a fictional girl related to Affleck. Apparently this novel later caused a myth that Affleck's second wife would have been a peasant's daughter called Inkeri Sormunen. Eino Leino wrote a poem collection called Simo Hurtta based on the stories about Affleck, which was published in two parts in 1904 and 1919, as well as a historical play in five parts called Simo Hurtta in 1908. The writer Onni Palaste wrote three novels about Affleck: Simo Hurtta (1978), Simo Hurtta ja Anna (1982) and Simo Hurtta ja isoviha (1983). Mauri Sariola wrote a book called Simo Hurtta ja kultainen pikari in 2002.

A film called Simo Hurtta produced by Jäger Filmi and directed by Roland af Hällström based on Eino Leino's play was published in 1940, starring Santeri Karilo as Affleck. Tauno Pylkkänen has composed an opera called Simo Hurtta which premiered in 1948.

The wolf and seven gold coins featured on the coat of arms of Valtimo have been said to refer to the name "Simo Hurtta" and his strict tax collection. Olof Eriksson's original design for the coat of arms from 1951 was even titled "Hurtta". The sports club Lieksan Hurtat is named after Simo Hurtta.

The company Poiketa ry produced a multidisclipinary performance called Hurtta about Simo Hurtta on the Ilosaari island of Joensuu in February 2010. A stand for the public was made of snow at the lagoon, and the performance itself was on the ice.
