= Indalsälven =

Coordinates: 62°30′N 17°26′E

Indalsälven Jämtlandsälven, Litsälven, Storsjöälven
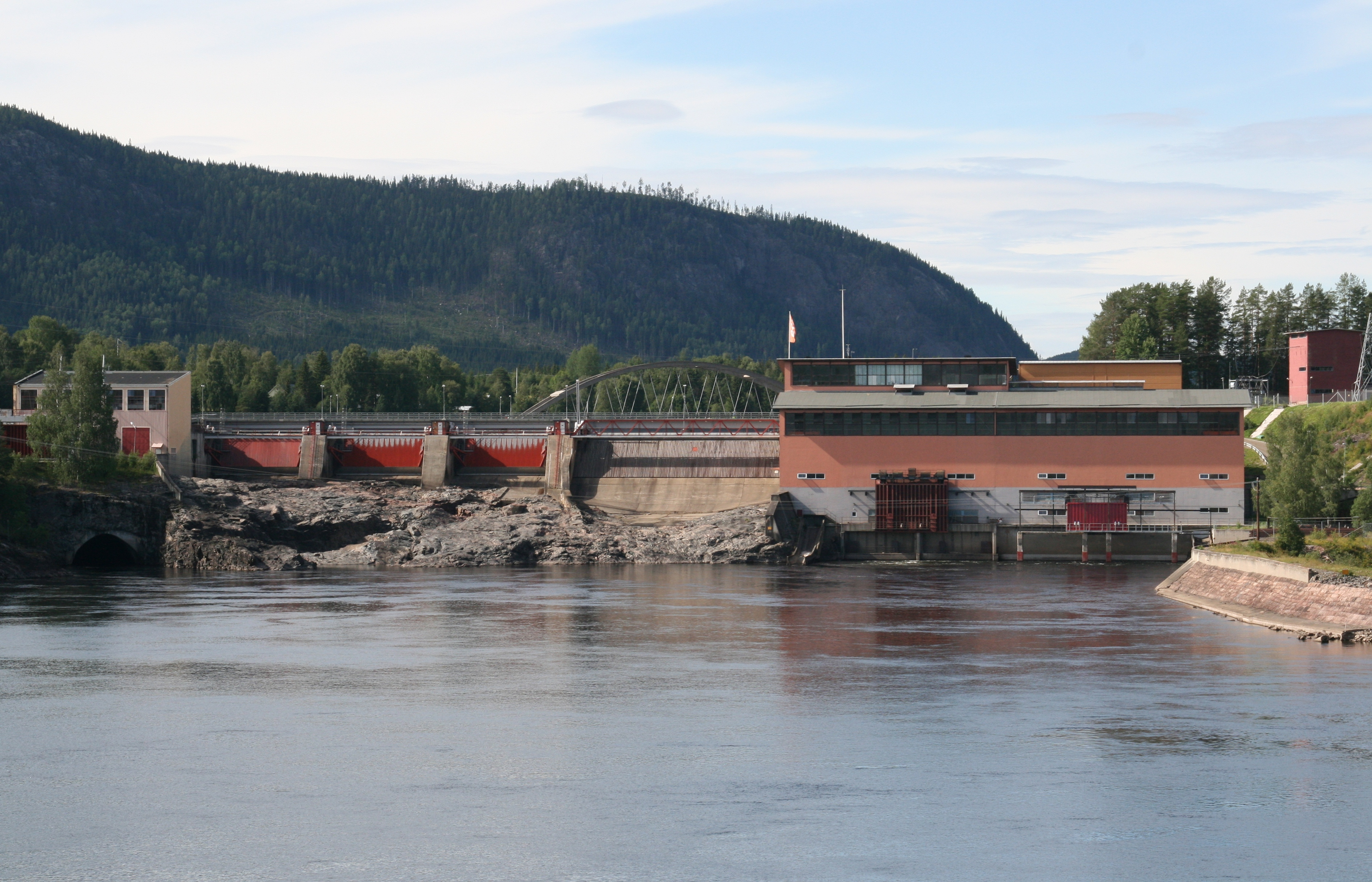
- One of the many hydropower plants of Indalsälven.

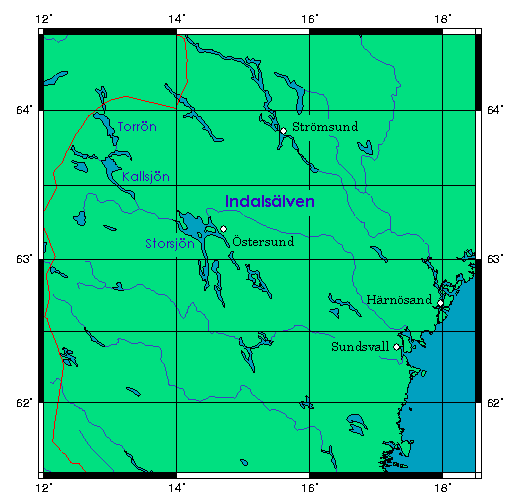
- Location of Indalsälven

Location
- Country: Sweden
- County: Jämtland, Västernorrland

Physical characteristics
- Source: Åreälven
- 2nd source: Järpströmmen
- Mouth: Klingerfjärden, near Sundsvall.
  - location: Bothnian Sea, Västernorrland County
  - elevation: 0 m (0 ft)
- Length: 420 km (260 mi)
- Basin size: 26,726.5 km^{2} (10,319.2 sq mi)
- Discharge
  - average: 460 m^{3}/s (16,000 cu ft/s)

Indalsälven is one of Sweden's longest rivers with a total length of 430 kilometers. Among its tributaries are Kallströmmen, Långan, Hårkan and Ammerån. A total of 26 hydropower plants are placed along its course, making it the third most power producing river of Sweden.

The Indalsälven drains the Storsjön and culminates in the Bothnian Sea.

== See also ==
- Döda fallet
