= Döda fallet =

Former whitewater rapid on the river Indalsälven, Sweden

Coordinates: 63.054°N 16.518°E

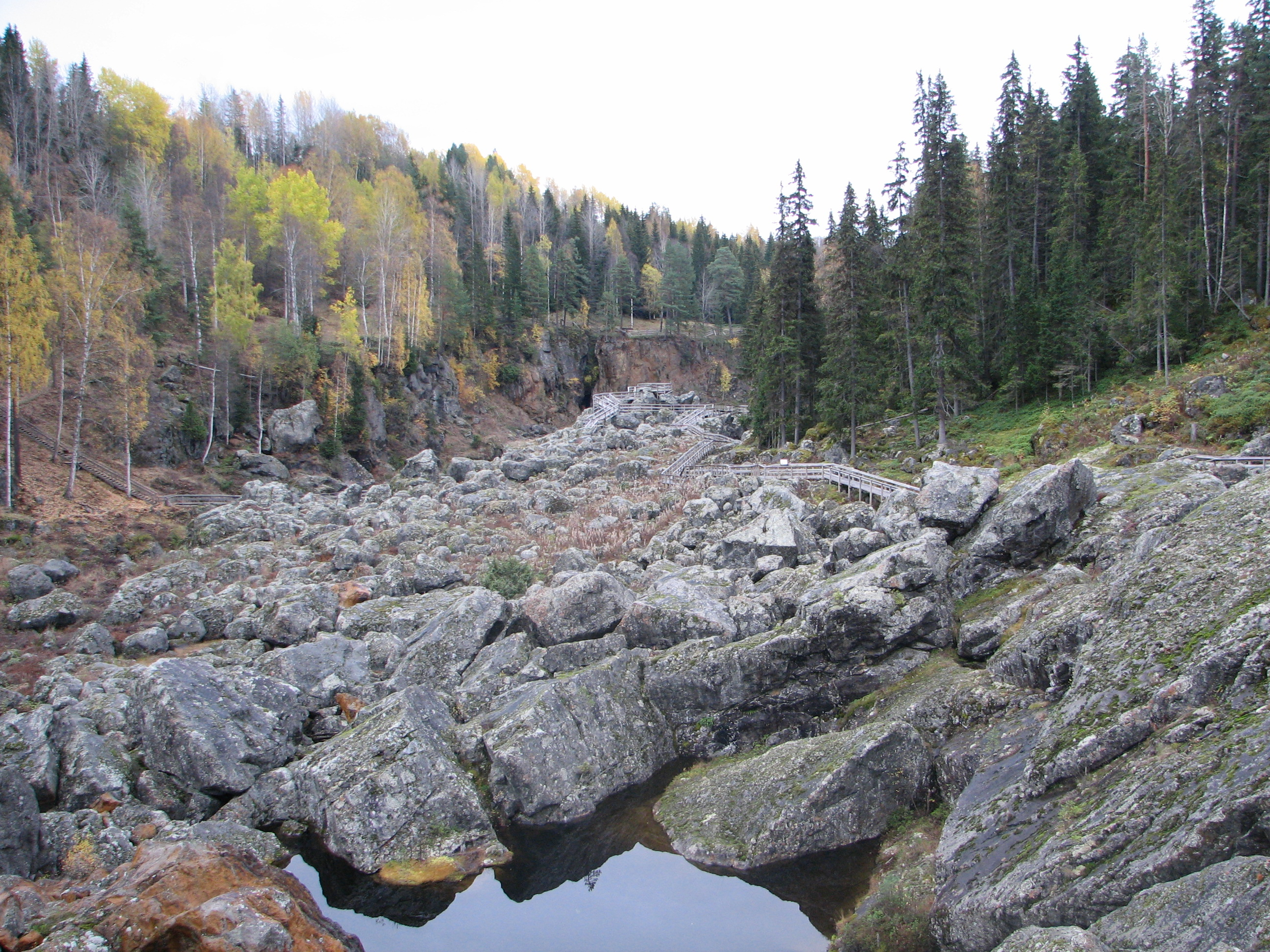
Döda Fallet in October 2006.

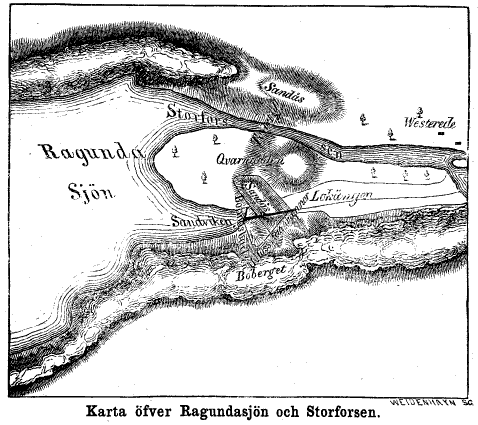
Map of downstream end of Ragundasjön (annotated in Swedish)

Döda fallet (English: the dead fall) is a former whitewater rapid in of the river Indalsälven in Ragunda Municipality in the eastern part of the province of Jämtland in Sweden. Glacial debris had blocked the course of the Indalsälven at Döda fallet for thousands of years, creating a reservoir of glacial meltwater 25 km (16 mi) long known as Ragundasjön (English: Ragunda lake), which overflowed over a natural spillway that bypassed this dam of debris, in a long high steep rapid known as Gedungsen or Storforsen (English: the great rapid). It was one of the most impressive rapids in Sweden with a total fall height of about 35 meters (115 feet) and a large water discharge.

The lake disappeared and the falls went dry in the 1796 Ragunda lake burst disaster after a flood rerouted the river through a small canal constructed to bypass the falls, carving a new channel and emptying the lake in four hours.

== Original situation ==
The Indalsälven flows through a valley between mountains in Jämtland province of Sweden. In one place its course before the Ice Age went southwest of a high rock spur with Qvarnodden hill on its end sticking out of the valley's northeast side. In the Ice Age its course past that spur was filled with glacial and periglacial deposit with an esker on top, so high that, after the ice retreated, the river backed up into a lake, later named Ragundasjön, 25 km (16 mi) long, which overflowed further northeast, over the neck of the spur, and flowing down from the spur caused the Storforsen rapids with a total 30 meters (94.5 feet) drop full of projecting rocks and big eddy potholes, destroying or damaging floating logs; over the millennia it eroded a gully in the rock. The waterfall was usually called Gedungsen, but sometimes Storforsen or Ragundaforsen, or popularly Gedunsen, or in older documents Getamsen.

== Plans start ==
In the late 18th century, logging emerged as a major industry in the heavily forested region of Jämtland because much forest near the coast had been felled. The rivers were used as fast and relatively easy transportation of the timber to the coastal sawmills. The whitewater rapid Storforsen however was a major obstacle as it damaged or destroyed much of the timber, forcing use of land transportation (portaging) past the waterfall. Another issue was that salmon could not swim upstream through Storforsen, and this made the fishing downstream good, but poor upstream.

In 1748, the city of Sundsvall applied for funding to build a canal to bypass Gedungsen, but by 1752 this had received no response from the Riksdag. In 1761, the Riksdag called for a survey for communications through the area, including a canal to bypass Gedungsen. Jacob Stenius completed a comprehensive survey in 1766. With experience from Finland, he rejected blasting Gedungsen into a smooth chute for logs, and suggested a bypass chute, or a bypass channel with a dam with sluice gates. King Gustav III gave his permission for a bypass canal company on 11 July 1779.

The first attempt to build a canal began in 1780 ended in failure after two years. In 1793, peasants in Ragunda and Stugun decided to resume work and formed a society called the Storforsen Company (Swedish: Storforsbolaget). Magnus Huss, also known as the Wild Huss (Vildhussen), formerly a merchant, who was born in the parish below Storforsen, contacted them and was appointed to solve the problem by constructing a bypass canal.

Preliminary work such as clearing forest was carried out in 1794 and 1795. Work on the canal channel started; there was sabotage by damaging wooden chutes by locals who feared damage to farmland and salmon fishing, or did not want to lose work portaging the logs past the obstruction. The canal was dug through unconsolidated glacial-outwash sand and gravel and the esker, and sand kept running back into the channel, and there was concern about the effect on the fishing, and thus the provincial governor (landshövding) ordered a stop to the digging. A new method was tried: a nearby stream was led into a temporary reservoir, which was released when full, washing much sand away, and this was repeated, steadily further upstream, until it reached Ragundasjön.

By 1795 the canal had reached the lake. Water began to flow through, but stopped because the river's flow was low.

== 1796 flood disaster ==
The spring flood of 1796 was unusually heavy, and lake water started to leak into the canal. The porous ground beneath the canal could not withstand the force of the water, which at 9 p.m. on 6 June started to quickly erode deep into the esker and the sediment below it. The two site guards saw this and ran for their lives up the south side of the valley to the high ground of Boberget hill. The thunderous rumble from the rampaging water was heard several miles away as it cut a new deep channel through the deep unconsolidated glacial deposit.

In only four hours in the night of 6/7 June 1796, Ragundasjön drained completely, triggering a 25-metre-high (82 ft) flood wave moving down the river towards forests, islands, sawmills, residential buildings, boat houses, utility buildings, barns, fields and meadows. This highly destructive flood wave, carrying a huge load of debris, established the much deeper, scoured-out course of the canal and of the Lokängen valley as part of the river's new course, thus restoring its probable prehistoric course to what it once was before the Ice Age.

Although it was one of Sweden's largest environmental disasters, no one is believed to have been killed by the event because it happened during the night and their houses were located on higher ground, but property, cultivated land, and the fishery were destroyed. Dead salmon lay all around on the meadows and hung in the trees. All that was left of Ragundasjön was a river course running through a smelly expanse of mud. Flood scour had created unstable cliffs of soft sediment up 10 meters high in the lakebed. In the years after the disaster, at least 12 people died when those cliffs collapsed while people were travelling on the old lakebed.

The washed-away soil and sediments redeposited at the Indalsälven's delta in the Baltic Sea north of Sundsvall, creating new land which Sundsvall–Timrå Airport was later built on. The final judgment on the case (for loss of fishing) came in 1975, 179 years later.

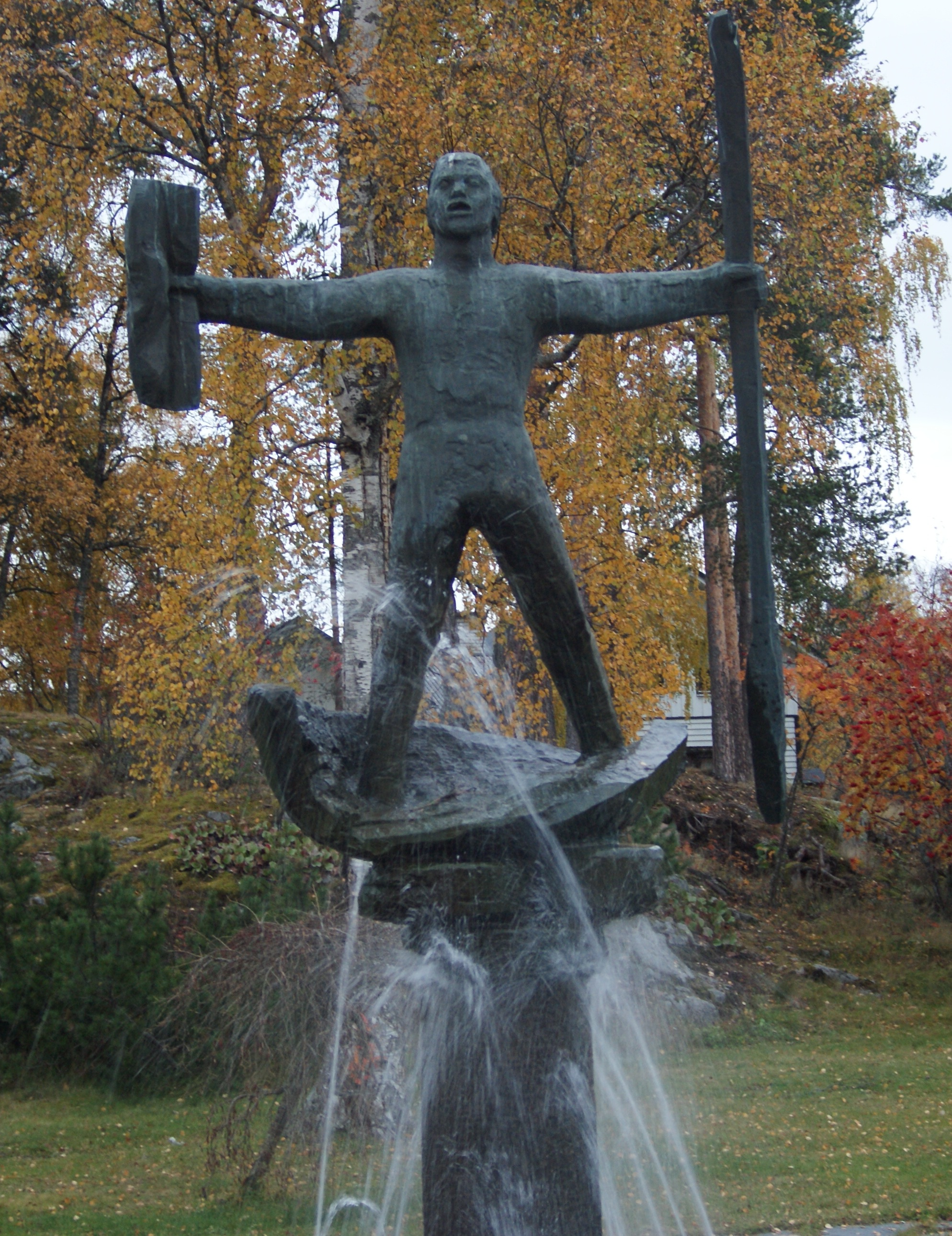
Statue commemorating Magnus Huss in Hammarstrand

An article in the Swedish Family Journal (Svenska Familj-Journalen) from 1864 describes how the Wild Huss in a boastful state wanted the whole of Sweden to know that the Indalsälven was navigable from above Ragunda, and to demonstrate it, he decided to travel along the river in a small boat out to the Baltic Sea and further down to Stockholm. But after only a few kilometers, he encountered the first major obstacle – Svarthålsforsen waterfall outside Bispgården. According to a version of the story, he wanted to portage past Svarthålsforsen, but re-launched too early where the current was still too strong. Some say that angry farmers released him on the Svarthålsforsen without oars, but others reject that story. What is certain is that the Wild Huss was found drowned a few miles further down the Indalsälven – killed by the water he tried to tamper with.

Indalsälven never became navigable. The salmon came back to it after 15 to 20 years. The old lake bed became fertile farmland. New young forest gradually covered the erosion scars around the river's new course.

Storforsen, dried, is now called Döda fallet (the Dead Fall).

At a rock barrier in the bottom of the former Ragundasjön a new waterfall was formed, Hammarfallet or Hammarforsen in Hammarstrand, now turned into a hydroelectric power station.

== IUGS geological heritage site for varves ==
Until 1796 varved sediment accumulated on the bottom of Ragundasjön. Since Swedish geologist, Gerard de Geer had an exact date at this site for the last varve laid down, it was crucial in his being able to make a final correlation with other hitherto uncertainly dated varve successions elsewhere in Sweden and establish the 'Swedish Time Scale'. In respect of its importance in the development of varve chronology, the 'Quaternary glacial varves of Ragunda' were included by the International Union of Geological Sciences (IUGS) in its assemblage of 100 'geological heritage sites' around the world in a listing published in October 2022. The organisation defines an 'IUGS Geological Heritage Site' as 'a key place with geological elements and/or processes of international scientific relevance, used as a reference, and/or with a substantial contribution to the development of geological sciences through history.'

== Heritage ==
Today Döda fallet is a nature reserve and one of the major tourist attractions of the municipality. Every year there is a play commemorating what happened in the spring of 1796. Magnus Huss is remembered by a statue in the small nearby town of Hammarstrand, which was built on the former lake bed of Ragundasjön. Döda fallet is also listed in the Reader's Digest publication Natural Wonders of the World.
