= Viekijärvi =

Lake in Finland

- Location within Finland
- Location: Lieksa
- Coordinates: 63°24′N 29°43′E
- Primary inflows: Kannelkoski
- Primary outflows: via Halinjoki river to the lake Pielinen
- Catchment area: Vuoksi
- Basin countries: Finland
- Surface area: 24.811 km^{2} (9.580 sq mi)
- Average depth: 5.83 m (19.1 ft)
- Max. depth: 23.2 m (76 ft)
- Water volume: 0.145 km^{3} (118,000 acre⋅ft)
- Shore length^{1}: 75.51 km (46.92 mi)
- Surface elevation: 93.8 m (308 ft)
- Frozen: December–April
- Islands: Kääläkänsaari
- Settlements: Vieki
- ^{1} Shore length is not a well-defined measure.

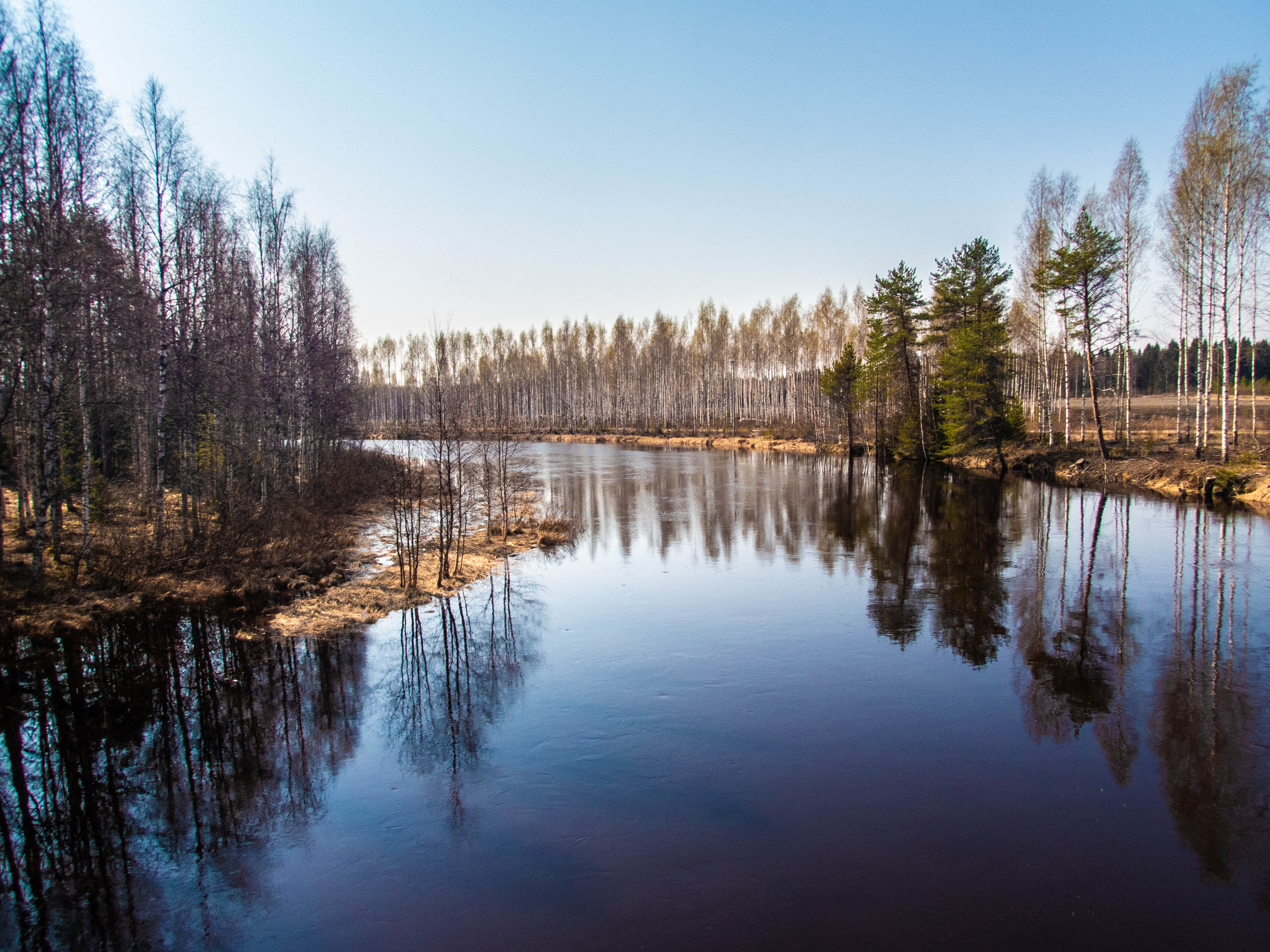
Viekijoki seen towards south from road 73

Viekijärvi is a medium-sized lake in the Vuoksi main catchment area. It is located in the region Northern Karelia in Finland.

== See also ==
- List of lakes in Finland
