= Lieksa-Nurmes Airfield =

Lieksa-Nurmes Airfield Lieksa-Nurmeksen lentokenttä
- IATA: none; ICAO: EFLN

Summary
- Airport type: Public
- Operator: Lieksa-Nurmeksen Lentokenttä Oy
- Location: Lieksa, Finland
- Elevation AMSL: 374 ft (114 m)
- Coordinates: 63°30′43″N 029°37′45″E

Map
- Location within Finland

Runways
Direction	Length		Surface
Direction	m	ft	Surface
11/29	940	3,084	Asphalt/gravel
- Source: VFR Finland

Lieksa-Nurmes Airfield (also known as Vieki Airfield) was an airfield in Lieksa, Finland, about 25 kilometres (16 mi) east of Nurmes town centre and about 40 kilometres (25 mi) northwest of Lieksa town centre.

The airfield's runway was surfaced with a mix of asphalt and gravel and was 940 meters long. Next to the airfield was a lean-to. The site also provided firewood and a toilet.

The airfield saw little use and increasing activity would have required significant investments. In June 2022, Lieksa-Nurmeksen Lentokenttä Oy, the company that maintained the airfield, was dissolved, and the airfield was closed. The land is intended to be developed into energy production.

== See also ==
- List of airports in Finland
