= Lieksa =

- Town
- Lieksan kaupunki Lieksa stad
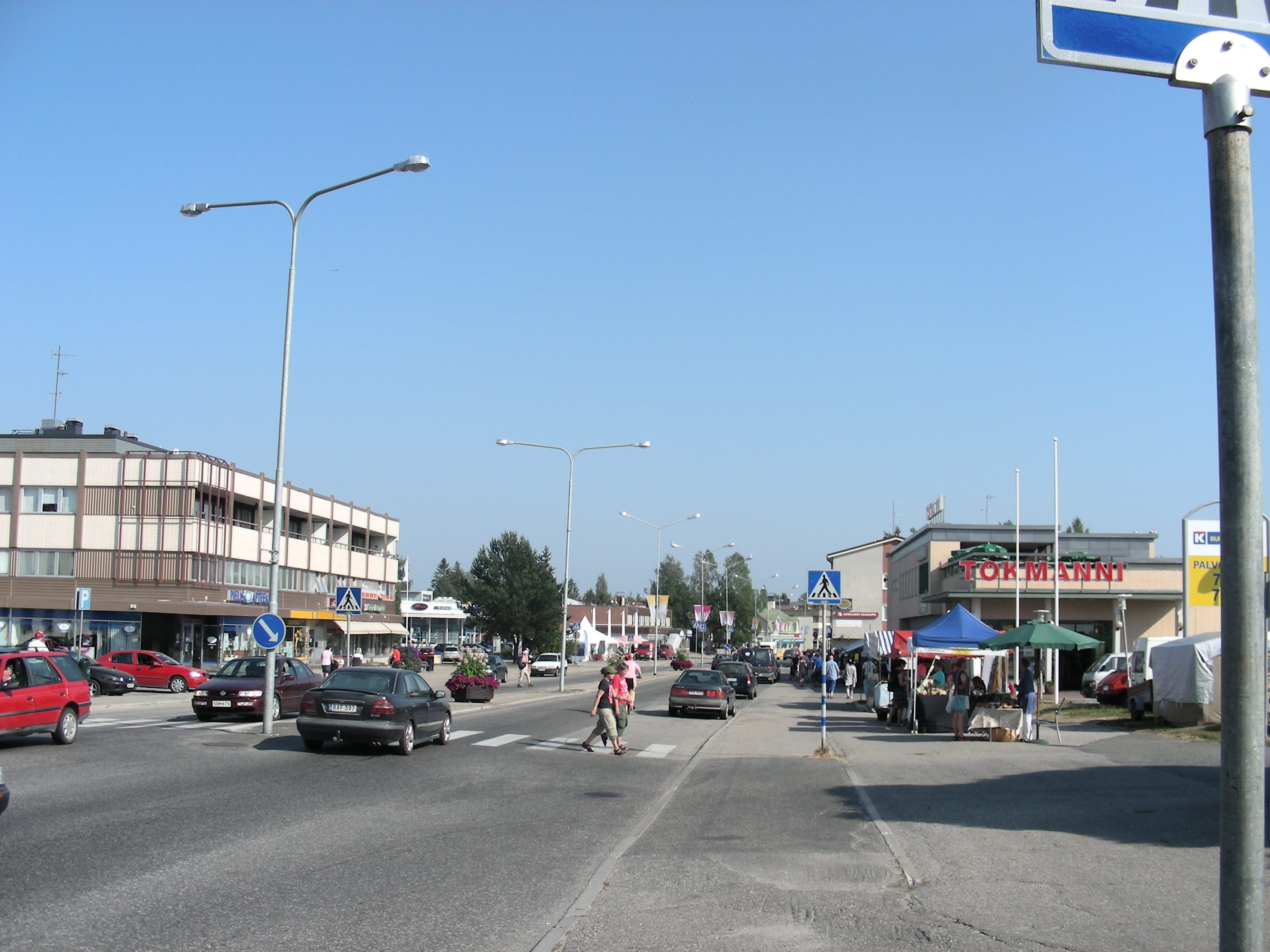
- Town center of Lieksa

- Flag Coat of arms

- Location of Lieksa in Finland
- Interactive map of Lieksa
- Coordinates: 63°19′N 030°01′E
- Country: Finland
- Region: North Karelia
- Sub-region: Pielinen Karelia
- Charter: 1973

Government
  - Town manager: Pirre Seppänen

Area (2018-01-01)
  - Total: 4,067.60 km^{2} (1,570.51 sq mi)
  - Land: 3,417.86 km^{2} (1,319.64 sq mi)
  - Water: 649.14 km^{2} (250.63 sq mi)
  - Rank: 15th largest in Finland

Population (2025-12-31)
  - Total: 9,846
  - Rank: 97th largest in Finland
  - Density: 2.88/km^{2} (7.5/sq mi)

Population by native language
  - Finnish: 93.2% (official)
  - Others: 6.8%

Population by age
  - 0 to 14: 9.9%
  - 15 to 64: 52%
  - 65 or older: 38.1%
- Time zone: UTC+02:00 (EET)
  - Summer (DST): UTC+03:00 (EEST)
- Website: www.lieksa.fi

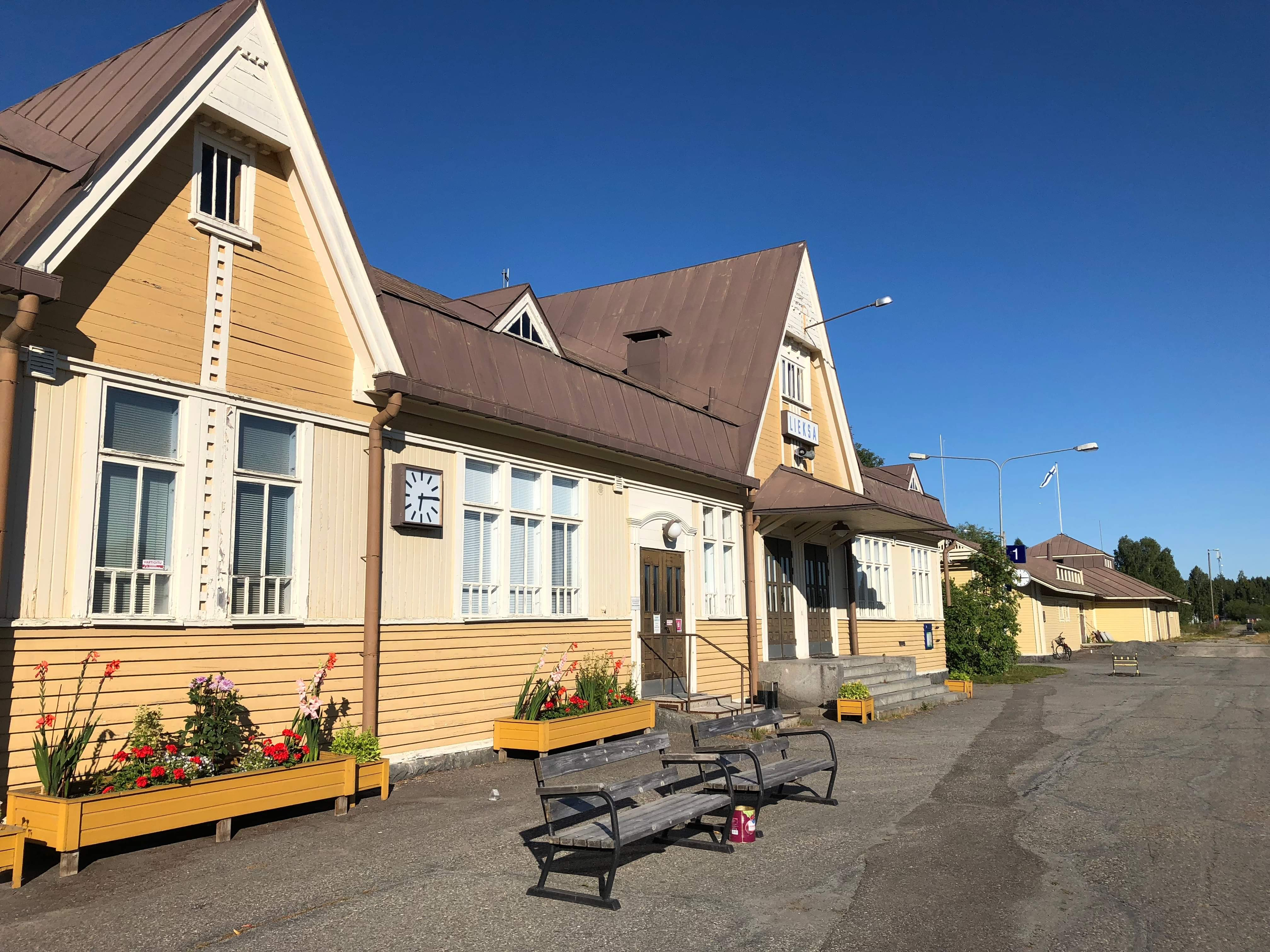
Lieksa railway station

Lieksa (Finnish pronunciation: [ˈlie̯ksɑ]) is a town and municipality of Finland. It is located in the North Karelia region. The municipality has a population of 9,846 (31 December 2025) and covers an area of 4,067.60 square kilometres (1,570.51 sq mi) of which 649.14 km^{2} (250.63 sq mi) is water. The population density is 2.88 inhabitants per square kilometre (7.5/sq mi).

The municipality is unilingually Finnish.

The town of Lieksa was established in 1973 when the Market town of Lieksa and the Municipality of Pielisjärvi were consolidated.

== History ==
=== Early ages of the region ===
Iron Age artifacts from the Lieksa area are represented by a bronze brooch, discovered at Kelvä, dating approximately 800 AD. The Treaty of Nöteborg in 1323 divided Karelia between Sweden and Novgorod, placing the Pielinen region under Novgorod administration. During the Novgorod rule, a permanent Karelian population was established in the area. The first villages in Pielisjärvi, including Lieksa and Viensuu, were in existence by the end of the 15th century. Under the Treaty of Teusina, Pielisjärvi remained with the sphere influence of Moscow, but the Treaty of Stolbovo in 1617 brought the area under Swedish, at which point it became a part of the Barony of Kajaani (Kajaanin Vapaaherrakunta). During the 17th century Savonian people migrated to the Pielisjärvi area to practice slash-and-burn agriculture.

=== The town of Brahea ===
The Lieksa region was an important trading hub as early as the Middle Ages. In the mid-17th century, Pielisjärvi became a part of the Barony of Kajaani. Count Per Brahe founded the town of Brahea near the mouth of Lieksanjoki in 1653 to support trade with White Karelia.

During the War of Rupture, a log fortification was built to defend the town. It had a round tower in each corner and two gates. Inside was a tavern.

Within the town, there stood a town hall, an Orthodox chapel, residences and a Lutheran church situated on the site of the modern day church.

==== Abolition of Brahea ====
Brahea was abolished already in 1681, just one year after the death of Count Brahe. The Pielisjärvi region was incorporated into Kexholm County. The county's governor, Hindrich Piper, ordered Brahea to be abolished. The abolition was carried out by Salomon Ehnberg, who had leased the Pielisjärvi parish from the Crown in 1685: the town's buildings were dismantled and the land was plowed into field.

At its peak, the town of Brahea had around 350 inhabitants. Following its abolition, it remained as a church village for the Pielisjärvi parish.

=== Pielisjärvi after the abolition of Brahea ===
In 1685, the tax-farming rights for Pielisjärvi were granted to Salomon Ehnberg, who soon delegated the task of tax collection to Simon Affleck. Affleck became a figure of folklore, known as Simo Hurtta, literally "Simo Hound". The era of tax farmers lasted until the years of the Great Wrath, during which the control shifted to the Russians for a period. In the aftermath of the Great Wrath, tax farmers were no longer able to maintain a firm grip on the people of Pielisjärvi.

Towards the end of the 17th century, Pielisjärvi suffered from crop failures and the resulting famine, just like many other areas. This sparked unrest against authorities and the local population rose in rebellion on several occasions, directed specifically against the widely hated Simon Affleck.

From the period following the Great Wrath up until the years of the Finnish War, two vicars, Jakob Stenius the Elder ("Korpi-Jaakko", 1704-1766) and Jakob Stenius the Younger ("Koski-Jaakko", 1732-1809) played a significant role in Pielisjärvi. There are two streets in Lieksa named after Korpi- and Koski-Jaakko respectively.

=== Birth of modern Lieksa ===
View from Koli to Lake Pielinen

Gradually, Lieksa, the hub of the Pielisjärvi region, grew into the center of the entire parish. In 1900, it was designated as a densely populated community. The local economy relied on timber and the area was known as a hub of loggers. Lieksan Sähkö Oy (Lieksa Electricity) was founded in September 1918. At the start, electricity was produced with a 40kW generator, powered by wood. In the late winter of 1919, homes in Lieksa that had connected to the grid, began to receive electric light, as oil lamps were being phased out. in 1929, own electricity production ended and electricity began to be transmitted from Enso-Gutzeit's Pankakoski mill to the center of Lieksa via high-voltage power line.

==== Great Fire of 1934 ====
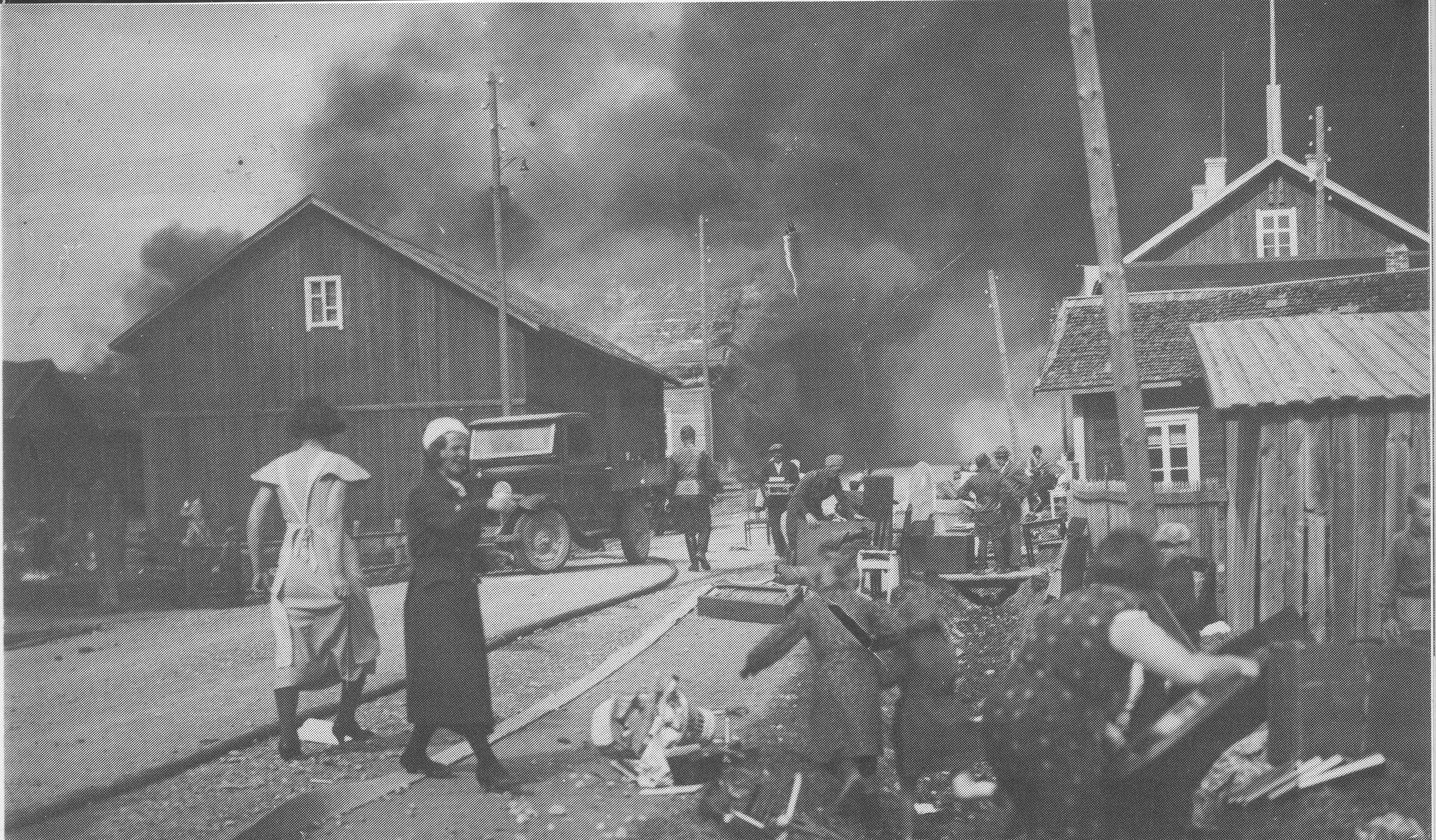
Great Fire of 1934 caused destruction

A devastating fire in 1934 destroyed nearly all old buildings in the town center. Only a few survived. The reconstruction that followed provided the reason for the establishment of the market town of Lieksa in 1936.

==== Merge with Pielisjärvi ====
Modern-day Lieksa came into existence in 1973 when the town of Lieksa and the municipality of Pielisjärvi merged. At the same time, Lieksa was granted the status of city (kaupunki). For a long time, it was the largest city in Finland by area.

== Geography ==
Neighbouring municipalities are Ilomantsi, Joensuu, Juuka, Kontiolahti, Kuhmo and Nurmes. Lieksa is bordered by Russia to the North-East. The Koli ice road that runs between Vuonislahti and Koli is the longest inland ice road in Europe.

=== Populated places ===
Populated places and villages within Lieksa include:

Egyptinkorpi, Hattusaari, Hattuvaara, Jamali, Kelvä, Koli, Kylänlahti, Mätäsvaara, Nurmijärvi, Pankajärvi, Vieki, Viensuu and Vuonislahti.

Most people in Lieksa live in urban areas (taajama). As of 2024, around 7,000 residents lived in urban areas, Lieksa and Pankakoski.

=== Climate ===
Lieksa has a subarctic climate (Köppen: Dfc), 0.7°C away from the threshold of the humid continental climate. Lieksa has more continental characteristics than most of the Nordics and Finland, making it prone to extreme temperatures, especially in winter. In summer temperatures regularly exceed 20.0 °C (68.0 °F), and the highest temperature ever recorded was 35.6 °C (96.1 °F) in July 1934. Also, during the Heatwave of 2010, the temperature in Lieksa reached 35.4 °C (95.7 °F) degrees. In winter, the snow cover is usually around 60 cm deep. On a typical winter night, the temperature drops to around −15.0 °C (5.0 °F) and readings as low as −30.0 °C (−22.0 °F) are not unusual. The coldest temperature ever observed in Lieksa was −47.0 °C (−52.6 °F) in December 1919.

Climate data for Lieksa, 1991-2020 normals, extremes 1916-present
Month	Jan	Feb	Mar	Apr	May	Jun	Jul	Aug	Sep	Oct	Nov	Dec	Year
Record high °C (°F)	6.7 (44.1)	6.6 (43.9)	11.6 (52.9)	23.6 (74.5)	30.2 (86.4)	31.8 (89.2)	35.6 (96.1)	31.9 (89.4)	25.9 (78.6)	18.4 (65.1)	10.9 (51.6)	7.6 (45.7)	35.6 (96.1)
Mean daily maximum °C (°F)	−6 (21)	−5.5 (22.1)	−0.1 (31.8)	6.2 (43.2)	13.7 (56.7)	18.8 (65.8)	21.7 (71.1)	19.2 (66.6)	13.3 (55.9)	5.8 (42.4)	0.1 (32.2)	−3.4 (25.9)	7.0 (44.6)
Daily mean °C (°F)	−9.4 (15.1)	−9.4 (15.1)	−4.7 (23.5)	1.5 (34.7)	8.4 (47.1)	13.8 (56.8)	16.6 (61.9)	14.3 (57.7)	9.3 (48.7)	3.2 (37.8)	−2 (28)	−6.2 (20.8)	3.0 (37.3)
Mean daily minimum °C (°F)	−13.4 (7.9)	−13.9 (7.0)	−9.6 (14.7)	−3.2 (26.2)	2.8 (37.0)	8.3 (46.9)	11.4 (52.5)	9.6 (49.3)	5.4 (41.7)	0.7 (33.3)	−4.6 (23.7)	−9.4 (15.1)	−1.3 (29.6)
Record low °C (°F)	−41.8 (−43.2)	−42.4 (−44.3)	−38.8 (−37.8)	−21.4 (−6.5)	−15.0 (5.0)	−6.5 (20.3)	−1.5 (29.3)	−2.0 (28.4)	−7.8 (18.0)	−21.5 (−6.7)	−30.5 (−22.9)	−47.0 (−52.6)	−47.0 (−52.6)
Average precipitation mm (inches)	55 (2.2)	46 (1.8)	43 (1.7)	37 (1.5)	55 (2.2)	75 (3.0)	93 (3.7)	83 (3.3)	76 (3.0)	76 (3.0)	67 (2.6)	66 (2.6)	772 (30.6)
Average precipitation days (≥ 0.1 mm)	21	18	16	12	13	14	14	16	17	18	20	22	201
Source 1: FMI
Source 2: FMI (record highs and lows)

== Demographics ==
In the end of 2025, 683 persons with a foreign background lived in Lieksa.

According to a population projection made in 2004, Lieksa would have 10,010 residents in 2030. The population however dropped under 10,000 in July 2025.

Population 1975-2025
Year	Population
1975	19,474
1980	19,157
1990	17,527
2000	15,208
2010	12,687
2015	11,722
2020	10,719
2025	9,846

== Economy ==
The Pankakoski cardboard factory, located in Pankakoski, employs 160 people.

Kevätniemi sawmill, owned by Binderholz Nordic Oy, produces planed timber for the Asian market, mainly Japan. It is also a major employer with around 200 employees.

Lieksan Lehti is the local newspaper, founded in 1954. In 2014, Lieksa was the third poorest municipality in Finland, according to Statistics Finland.

== Education ==
Lieksa has four schools. Lieksan Keskuskoulu, Lieksan Yläkoulu (Grades 7-9), Rantala school and Koli school. Multiple schools in Lieksa have been closed between 2000-2021 due to low student amounts. The last to be closed were Jamali school and Vuoniskylät school.

Lieksa also has a general secondary upper school, Lieksan Lukio.

== Culture ==
Lieksa is a town of music. The most important music event is Lieksa Brass Week, the largest brass music event in the Nordic countries. The Lieksa culture center has a youth center, a conference room, a band room and a 340-seater Brahea-hall. The center also has a cinema.

=== Sports ===
Lieksan Hurtat are the town's hockey team. Hurtat also have a football team. Lieksan Urheilijat Ry is known for winter sports (such as skiing) and track and field. Lieksan Into play floorball in Suomisarja, the third highest level of Finnish floorball. Lieksan Palloseura (LiPaSe) plays football in Vitonen. The Liehu Welfare Center provides facilities for multiple indoor sports, including futsal, basketball and volleyball. The center also has a gym and a swimming pool.

=== Sights ===
- Eeva Ryynänen atelier and Paateri Church (1991)
- Koli, 347 m
- Lieksa Church (1982)
- Lieksa culture center (1985)
- Lieksankoski power plant (Alvar Aalto, 1960)
- Patvinsuo National Park
- Ruunaa rapids
- Water tower, 47 m, (1955)

== Notable people ==
- Heino Kaski (1885–1957), composer
- Mira Jalosuo (born 1989), Olympic ice hockey medalist
- Ilmari Juutilainen (1914–1999), top flying ace of the Finnish Air Force
- Jorma J. Rissanen (1933–2020), information theorist
- Marutei Tsurunen (弦念丸呈, ツルネン・マルテイ, Tsurunen Marutei; born Martti Turunen in 1940), Finnish-born Japanese politician and first European-born member of the Diet of Japan
- Heikki Turunen (born 1945), author

== Transport ==
The nearest airport is Joensuu Airport, located 100 km (62 mi) south of Lieksa. The airport provides direct routes to Helsinki which are operated by Finnair. Lieksa-Nurmes Airfield provided a general aviation airport for Lieksa (and Nurmes) before its closure in 2022.

Lieksa railway station is located in the Lieksa town center. There are four trains a day to Joensuu and Nurmes, two each way. Kylänlahti and Vuonislahti stations are also located inside the Lieksa municipality.

Bus services operate from Lieksa to Nurmes and Joensuu. There are also busses to Koli from Joensuu.

== See also ==
- Lieksanjoki
- Koli National Park
- Koli, Finland
- Kuhmo
- Reboly
