= Mätäsvaara =

Mining village in Finland

Coordinates: 63°26′16″N 29°35′25″E

Mätäsvaara is a small village in Finland in the town of Lieksa, North Karelia. It is located on the east side of the lake Pielinen and between the town of Nurmes 27 kilometres from the centre of Lieksa.

The village was the site of significant mining activities in the 20th century. The mining focused on a molybdenum deposit, with mining beginning in 1903. The mining remained small-scale until World War II. As molybdenum alloys could be used to create high-quality steel, there was a great deal of demand for molybdenum to build weapons of war. In 1939 and 1940, the mine was built up, eventually becoming the second-largest in Finland. The Mätäsvaara mine supplied much of the molybdenum used by Nazi Germany for its wartime steel demands. At its peak, more than one thousand people lived in the village. The mine closed after the war, in 1947, and the village shrunk with it.

As a result of its mining wealth, the village had impressive architecture for its size, much of it designed by the architect Alvar Aalto and containing relatively state-of-the-art features, such as central heating. However, much of the village has fallen into disrepair since the closure of the mine. As of 2015, the village's population was below 50.

In 2025, the Finnish government granted new exploratory mining permits to determine the viability of resuming mining in the area, possibly expanding beyond molybdenum to nickel, copper, and cobalt as well.
