= Olli Soikkeli =

Finnish jazz guitarist

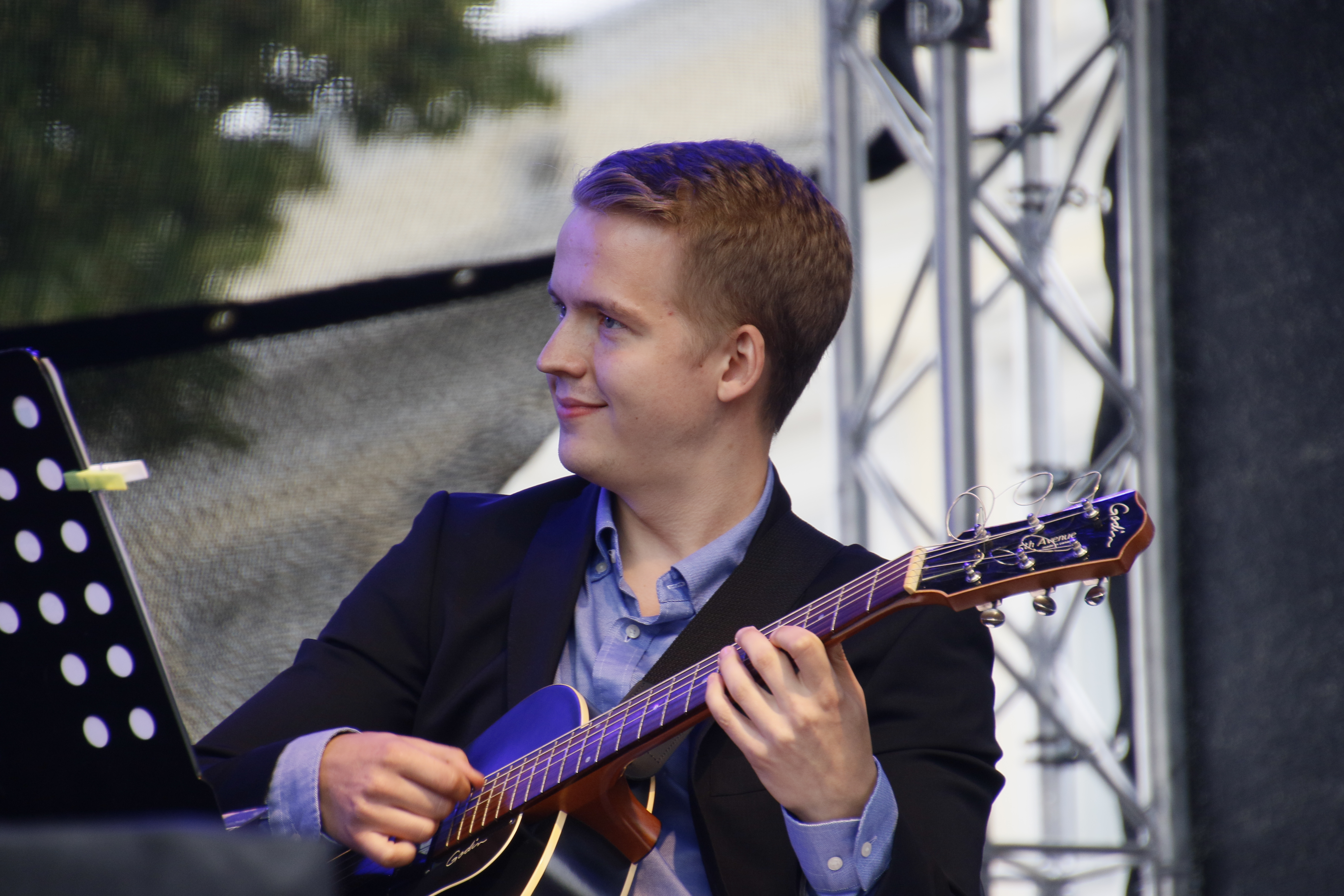
Olli Soikkeli

Olli Soikkeli (born 1991) is a Finnish jazz guitarist. He was born in Nurmes.

== Discography ==
=== Solo albums ===
With Rhythm Future Quartet

- 2014: Rhythm Future Quartet
- 2016: Travels

With Julien Labro & Olli Soikkeli Quartet

- 2017: Rise & Grind

=== Collaborations ===
- 2011: Trois Générations, with Hot Club de Finlande and Vitali Imereli
- 2012: Kouvola Junction, with Paulus Schäfer and Arnoud van den Berg
- 2016: The Best Things in Life Are Free, Hot Club d’Europe
