= Hårkan =

Mountain river in Jämtland, Sweden

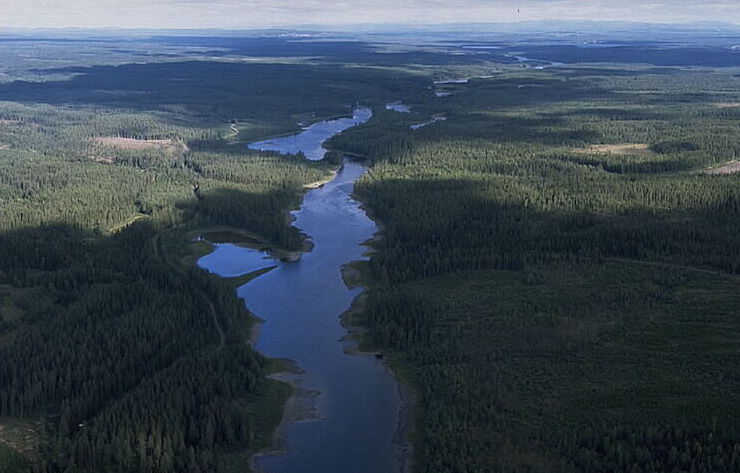
- Aerial photo from 1996 over Hårkan at Aspnäset south of Sandvikssjön.

Location
- Country: Sweden
- County: Jämtland County

Physical characteristics
- Mouth: Indalsälven
  - location: East of Lit
- Length: 184 km
- Basin size: 3,990 km²

Basin features
- Coordinates: 63°19′0″N 14°52′59″E

Hårkan, a mountain river in Jämtland, Sweden is a tributary of the Indalsälven, with which it joins east of Lit. Including its source streams, it has a length of 184 km and a drainage basin of 3,990 km², a significant part of which is in Norway.

Hårkan has several fishing spots, mainly for grayling fishing. Other fishable species in Hårkan include pike, whitefish, and perch found in the calmer parts of the river.
