= Onni Palaste =

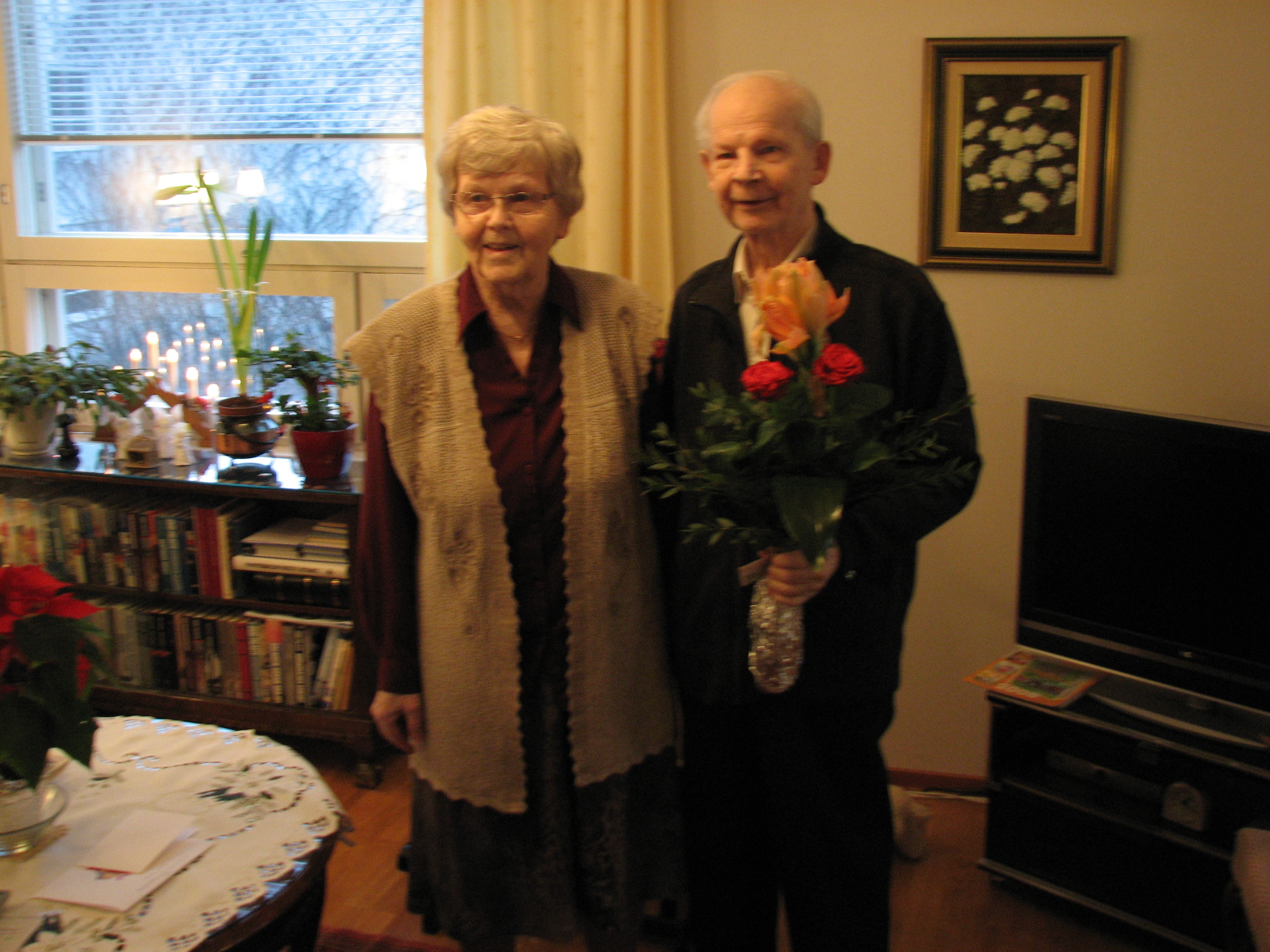
Onni (right) and Kerttu Palaste in 2007

Onni Palaste, born Onni Bovellan (27 December 1917 - 1 July 2009) was a Finnish Winter War veteran and writer.

Onni Bovellan was born in Kiuruvesi, Finland on 27 December 1917 to parents Joona Bovellan and Olga Miina Kärkkäinen. He was a frail child and was not originally expected to live long. However, he survived and became healthy. After finishing school, Bovellan went to work in a sawmill.

In the Winter War, Bovellan fought in Colonel Hjalmar Siilasvuo's troops. He led many successful patrols to Soviet territory and was awarded the Iron Cross.

After the Winter War, Onni Bovellan changed his surname to Palaste. He worked as director of the Vuokatti sports academy and also met his wife Kerttu Klemetti.

Onni Palaste started writing factual, but slightly dramatised novels about the Winter War in 1967. His original inspiration to writing was winning a short story competition during the war, after which his fellow soldiers suggested he try writing full-length novels. He had written about twenty war novels, the latest of which was published in 2004. He has also written a three-novel mini-series about Simo Hurtta, a Swedish tax official during the 17th-18th century Greater Wrath.

Onni and Kerttu Palaste lived their elder years in Helsinki, Finland. Onni Palaste died on 1 July 2009 at the age of 91. He and his wife Kerttu are survived by their four children.

== Bibliography ==
- Rukajärven sissit, 1967
- Minä, desantti, 1970
- Sissi rajan takaa, 1972
- Siviilisissit Stalinin kanavalla, 1973
- Simo Hurtta, 1978
- Suomussalmen sankarit, 1979
- Talvisodan ääniä, 1980
- Irina ja Mannerheim, 1981
- Simo Hurtta ja Anna, 1982
- Simo Hurtta ja Isoviha, 1983
- Aina Hangosta Petsamoon, 1984
- Sissiretki surman suuhun, 1985
- Isät katsovat poikiaan, 1985
- Toki kallehin on vapaus, 1986
- Lapin sissi, 1988
- Viimeiseen sissiin, 1992
- Raappanan miehet, 1996
- Korpisodan sankarit, 1998
- Kaukopartio, 2003
