= Vieki =

Village in Lieksa, Finland

- Village
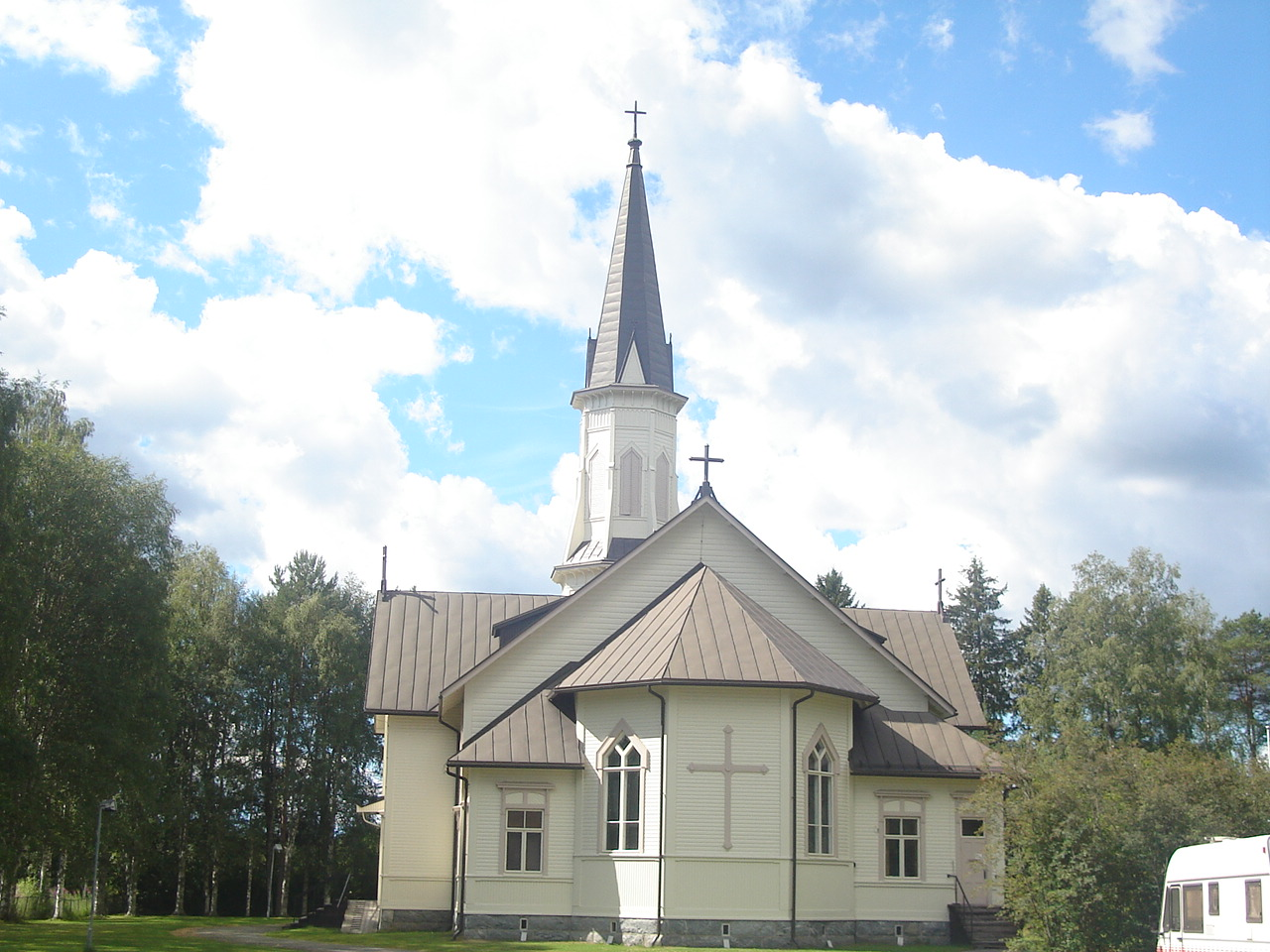
- Vieki Church

- Location within Finland
- Coordinates: 63°28′N 029°37′E
- Country: Finland
- Region: North Karelia
- Town: Lieksa

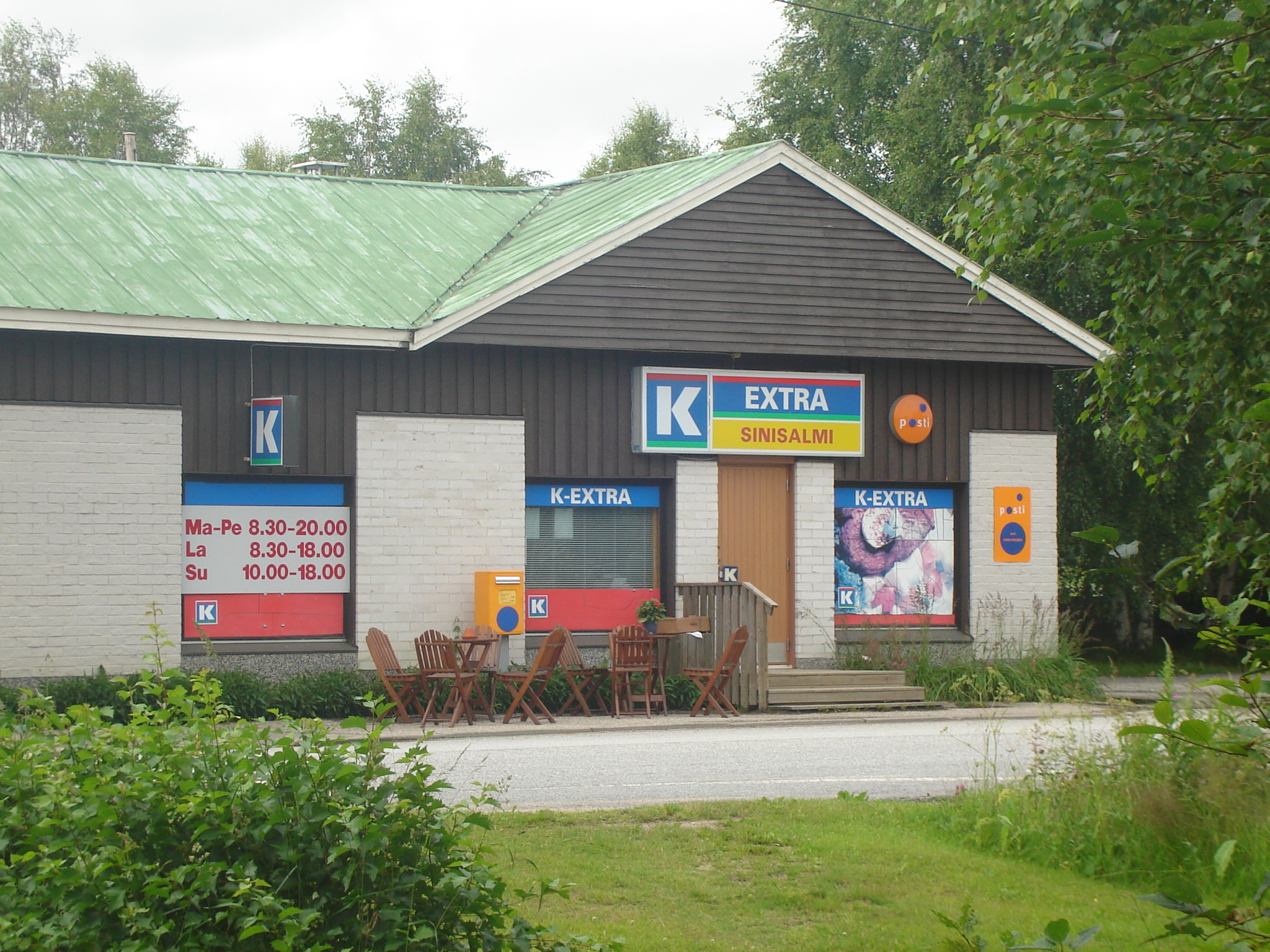
K-Extra Sinisalmi, a local supermarket in Vieki

Vieki is a small village in Finland in the town of Lieksa, North Karelia. It is situated on the northern stand of the lake Viekijärvi.
