= Jani Hartikainen =

Finnish footballer (born 1975)

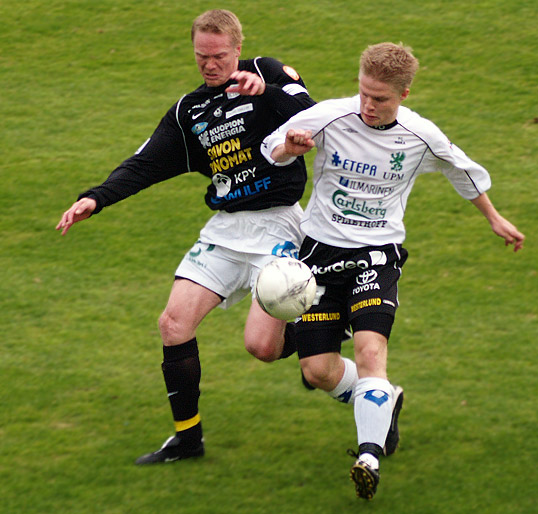
- Hartikainen (left)

Personal information
- Date of birth: 16 September 1975 (age 51)
- Place of birth: Nurmes, Finland
- Height: 1.78 m (5 ft 10 in)
- Position: Defender

Team information
- Current team: KuPS
- Number: 5

Senior career*
Years	Team	Apps	(Gls)
2003–	KuPS	132	(12)
- * Club domestic league appearances and goals as of 12 October 2009

Jani Hartikainen (born 16 September 1975) is a Finnish football player who currently plays for the Finnish premiership Veikkausliiga club KuPS in Finland.
