= Ruunaanjärvi =

Lake in Finland

- Location within Finland
- Coordinates: 63°24′N 30°33′E
- Type: Lake
- Catchment area: Vuoksi
- Basin countries: Finland
- Surface area: 12.428 km^{2} (4.798 sq mi)
- Average depth: 4.14 m (13.6 ft)
- Max. depth: 22.5 m (74 ft)
- Water volume: 0.0515 km^{3} (41,800 acre⋅ft)
- Shore length^{1}: 44.57 km (27.69 mi)
- Surface elevation: 139.1 m (456 ft)
- Frozen: November–April
- Islands: Marjosaari
- Settlements: Lieksa
- ^{1} Shore length is not a well-defined measure.

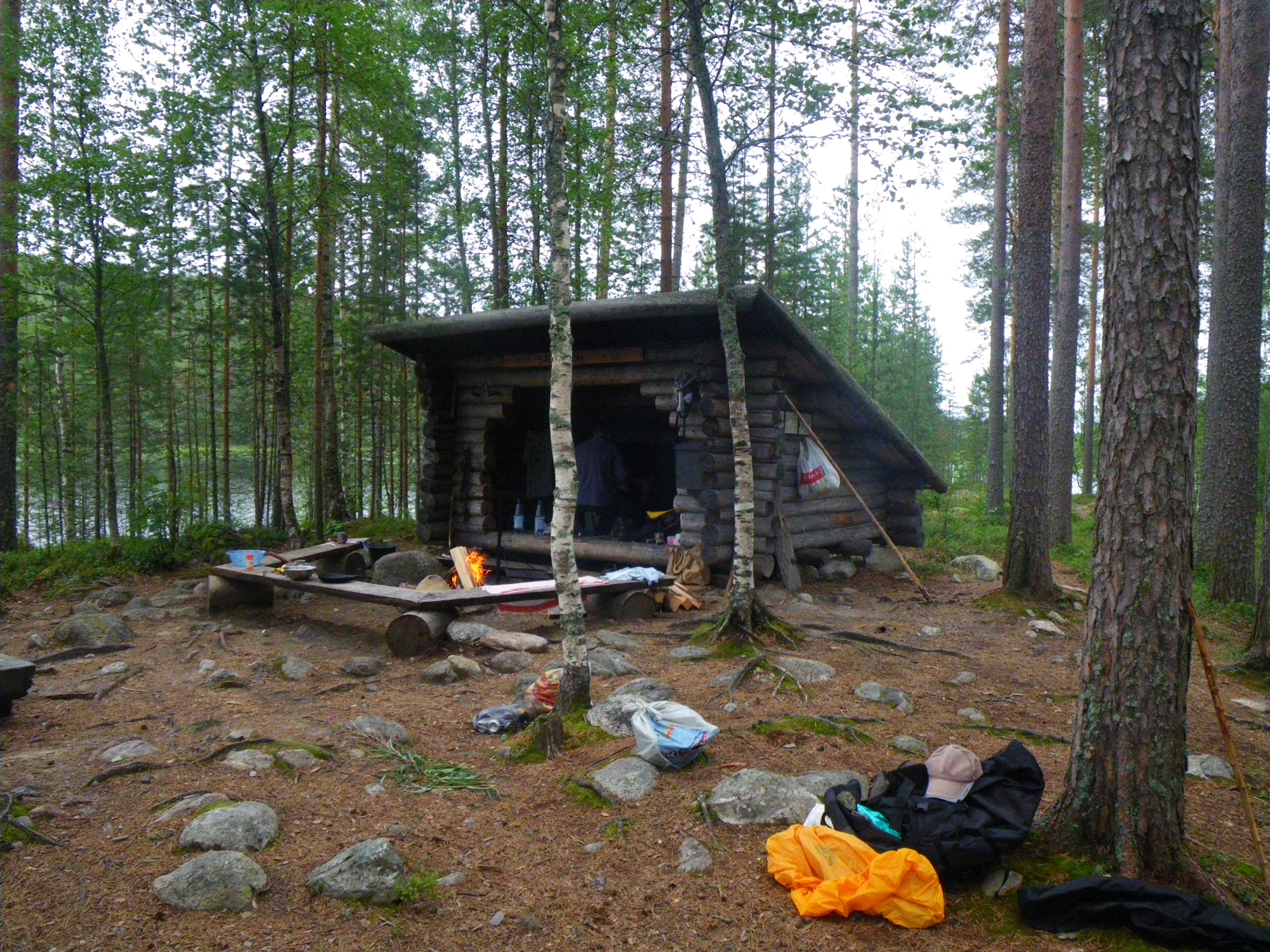
Camping near Ruunaanjärvi

Ruunaanjärvi, or Lake Ruunaa, is a medium-sized lake in the Vuoksi main catchment area in Finland. It is located in the Northern Karelia region and Lieksa municipality. The lake is a part of Ruunaa Hiking Center, which is famous for the possibilities to white water kayaking.

== See also ==
- List of lakes in Finland
