= Ammerån =

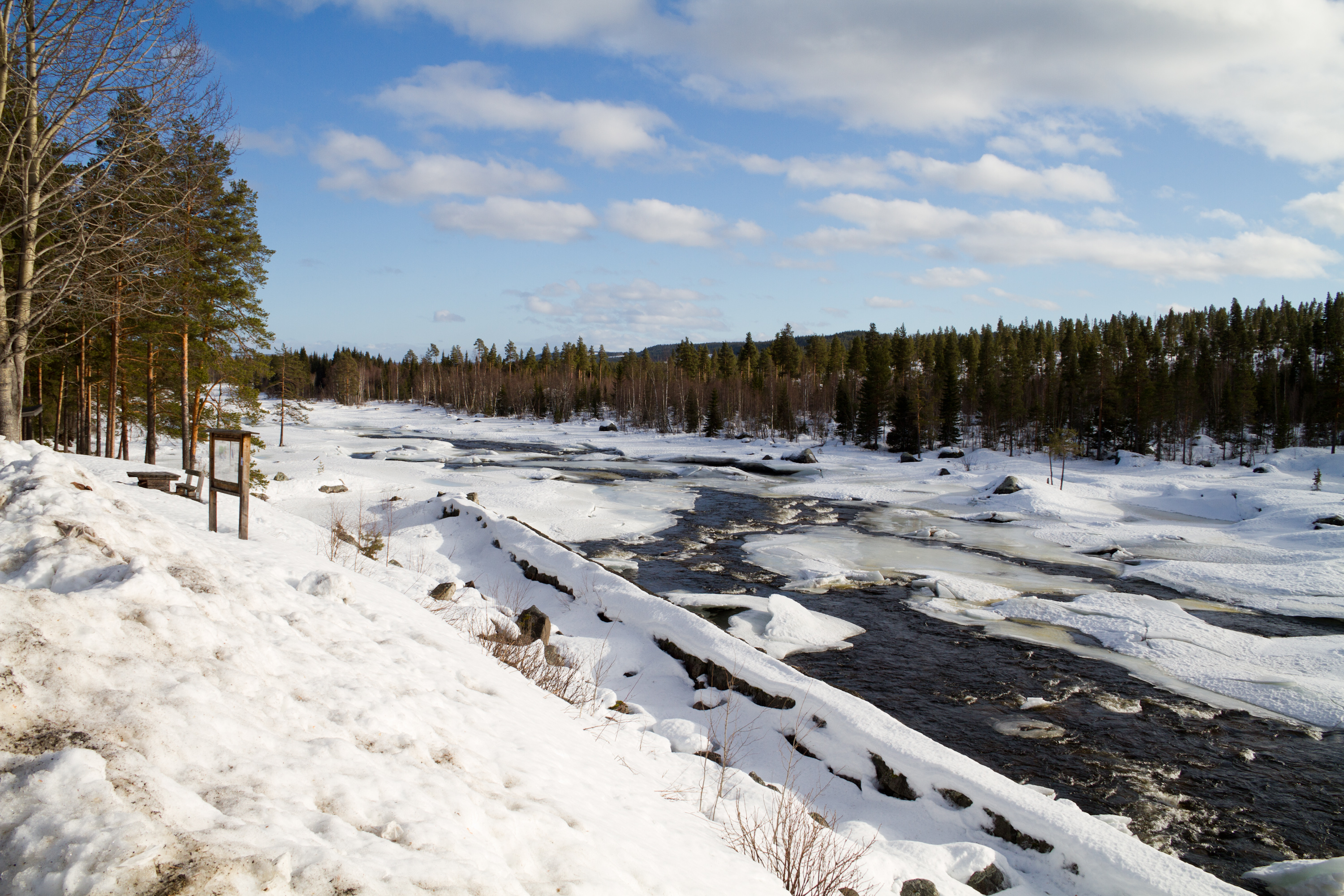
- Ammerån in March

Location
- Country: Sweden
- County: Jämtland County

Physical characteristics
- Source: Lake Hammerdal (Hammerdalssjön)
  - elevation: 302 m (991 ft)
- Mouth: Indalsälven
  - coordinates: 63°09′15″N 16°13′05″E
  - elevation: 130 m (430 ft)
- Length: 70 km (43 mi)
- Basin size: 3,098 km^{2} (1,196 sq mi)
- Discharge
  - average: 45 m^{3}/s (1,600 cu ft/s)

Ammerån is a river in Jämtland, Sweden. It is a tributary of Indalsälven.
