= Elli Saurio =

Finnish economist (1899–1966)

Prof. Elli Ivarintytär Saurio
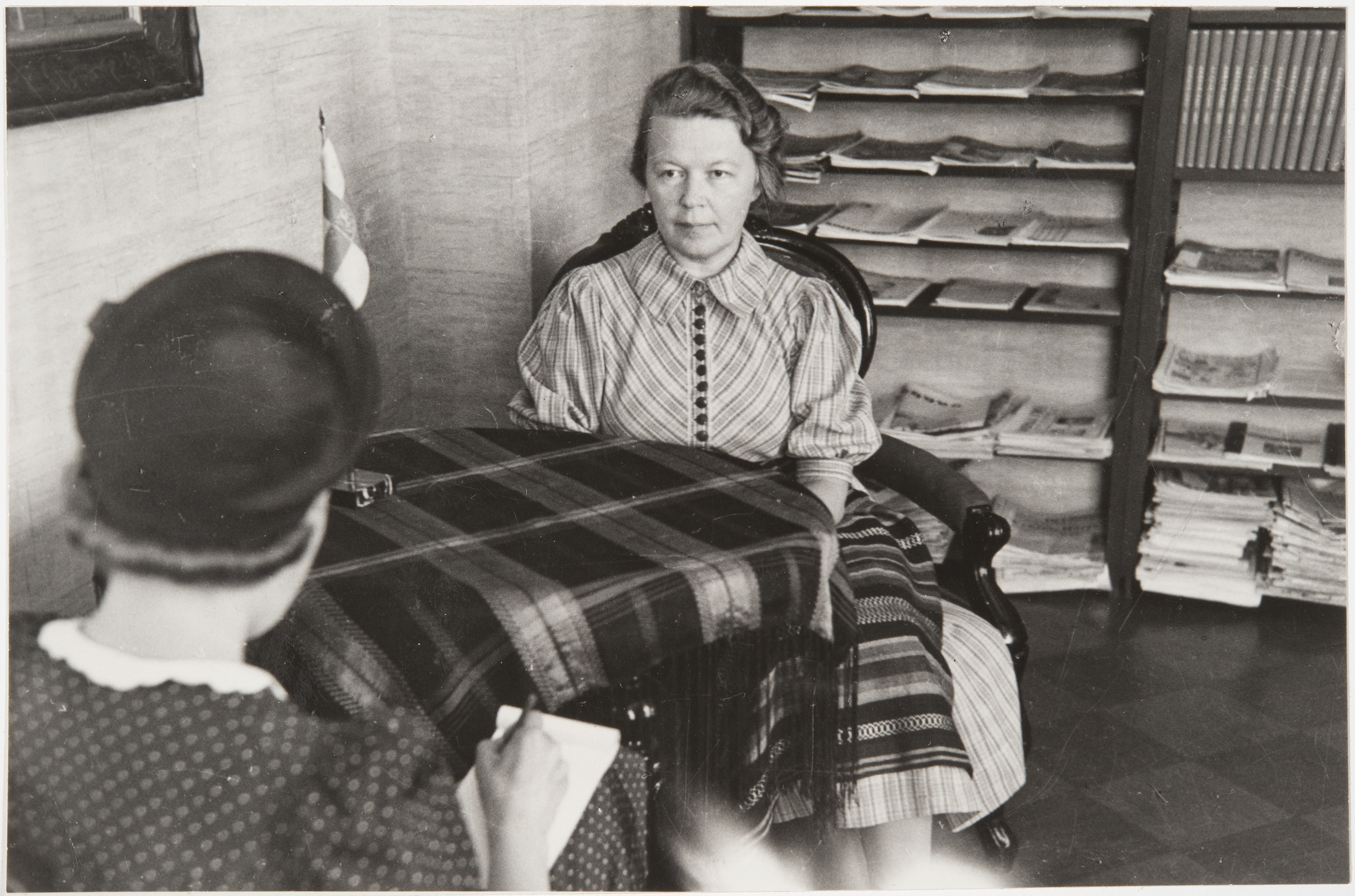
- Born: 31 December 1899; Nurmes, Grand Duchy of Finland, Russian Empire
- Died: 26 December 1966 (aged 66); Helsinki, Finland
- Occupation: Economist
- Known for: First professor of household economics in Europe, first female doctor of economy in Finland
- Title: Professor
- Awards: Order of the Lion of Finland

Academic background
- Education: University of Helsinki

Academic work
- Discipline: Economics
- Sub-discipline: Household economics

Elli Saurio (31 December 1899 – 26 December 1966) was a Finnish economist. She was the first professor of household economics in Europe, the first woman in Finland to hold a doctorate in economics, and the first female professor in the University of Helsinki Faculty of Agriculture and Forestry.

== Biography ==
Born as Elli Ivarintytär Saurio on 31 December 1899 in Nurmes, North Karelia, Finland, Elli Saurio was the daughter of Josef Ivar Saurio (1869–1910) and Hilja Vilhelmiina Hukka (1876–1910).

In 1925, she started her professional career as a household consultant at the Finnish Marttaliitto. From 1933 to 1944, she also served as executive director of Marttaliitto. She became the first woman in Finland to hold a doctorate in the field of home economics, receiving her degree in 1947 from the Faculty of Arts of the University of Helsinki.

She was appointed as a professor of home economics at the Faculty of Agriculture and Forestry, University of Helsinki in 1950, and she continued in this job until her death in 1966. Creation of a position of professor in home economics at the University of Helsinki in 1946 is being considered as “the first professorship of its kind in Europe.”

In addition to her academic activities, Saurio acted as the editor-in-chief of the Emäntälehti magazine from 1934 to 1944 and as a member of the editorial staff of the Kotitalous magazine from 1952 to her death. Over her career, she was also a member in various national and Nordic committees and commissions on subjects relating to home economics, as well as a board member in associations such as the Family Federation of Finland.

She was awarded Order of the Lion of Finland in 1959.

She died in Helsinki on 26 December 1966.
