= Kastelli community centre =

Community centre in Oulu, Finland

- Kastellin monitoimitalo
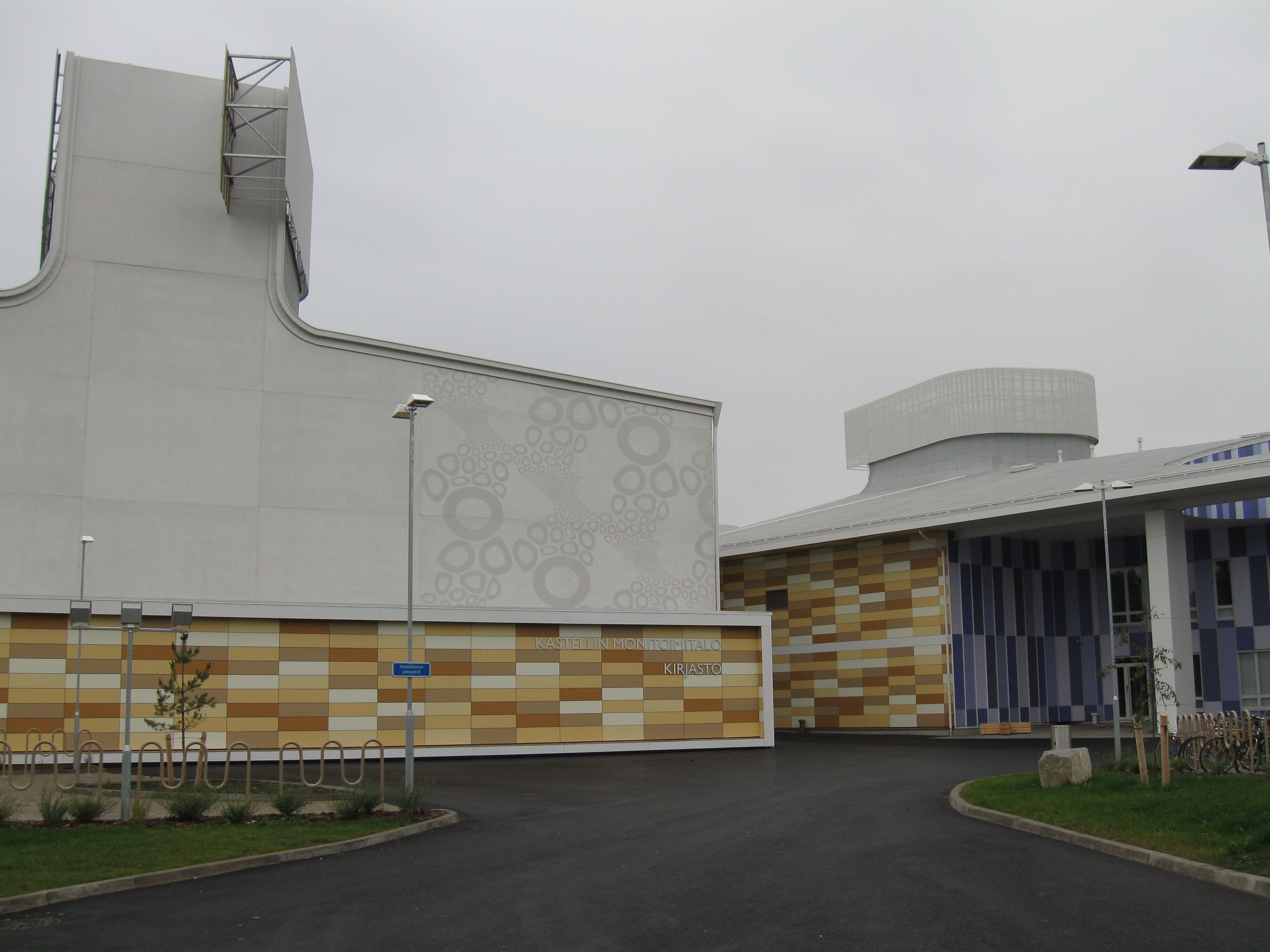
- Interactive map of the Kastelli community centre area

General information
- Location: Sairaalarinne 5, 90220 Oulu, Kontinkangas, Oulu, Finland
- Coordinates: 65°00′07.92″N 25°31′26.04″E
- Construction stopped: 2014
- Cost: ~42 million Euroes
- Owner: The city of Oulu

Height
- Height: 11 m (36 ft)

Technical details
- Floor count: 2

Design and construction
- Architecture firm: Lahdelma & Mahlamäki Oy

Kastelli community centre (Kastellin monitoimitalo in Finnish) located in the district of Kontinkangas in Oulu, Finland is a multipurpose building that houses the city's public daycare, basic education, high school and library services as well as a youth center "huudi".

== Building ==
The construction costs of the community centre were around 42 million euros total with a Public-private partnership (PPP) of 25 years with the construction firm Lemminkäinen. The building lies on a seven hectare property and its total area is around 23 000 gross square metres (35 650 071.3 square feet) and floor area measured at 24 588 square metres (264 663.029 square feet). Construction on the community centre began in 2012 and was completed in 2014 when it was handed over for the city's operations and inauguration for the building was held later that year in November. The PPP with the city and the construction firm which includes the maintenance of the building is valid until 2039 and the deals total value is around 86 million euros.

== The school and daycare services ==
The community centre houses the Kastelli elementary and middle schools which together have around 770 students and 65 staff members and the two high schools which from the regular one there's around 700 students and 45 staff members and from the adult one around 350 students and 35 staff members. The daycare center has around 120 children and 20 staff members and there's also an auditorium in the community centre with space for 250 people and a cafe in the lobby.

== Gym space ==
The community centre has four gyms marked from A to D. The A-gym has an area of around 1 585 square meters (17 060.798 square feet) with a height of 10 meters (32.81 feet) and it is the biggest gym of the building dividable into 3 different zones with wall curtains. The A-gym also has 500 seats on telescoping bleachers and 300 solid audience seats for people. The community centres gyms are used for many different events but they are mainly used by the school students for physical education mostly floorball, volleyball, basketball and badminton.

== Awards ==
The Kastelli community centre building has achieved a gold level LEED for schools certificate and won the Finnish RIL-building award from the building engineer union of Finland. It was also a MIPIM awards best innovative green building series finalist in 2015.

== Gallery ==
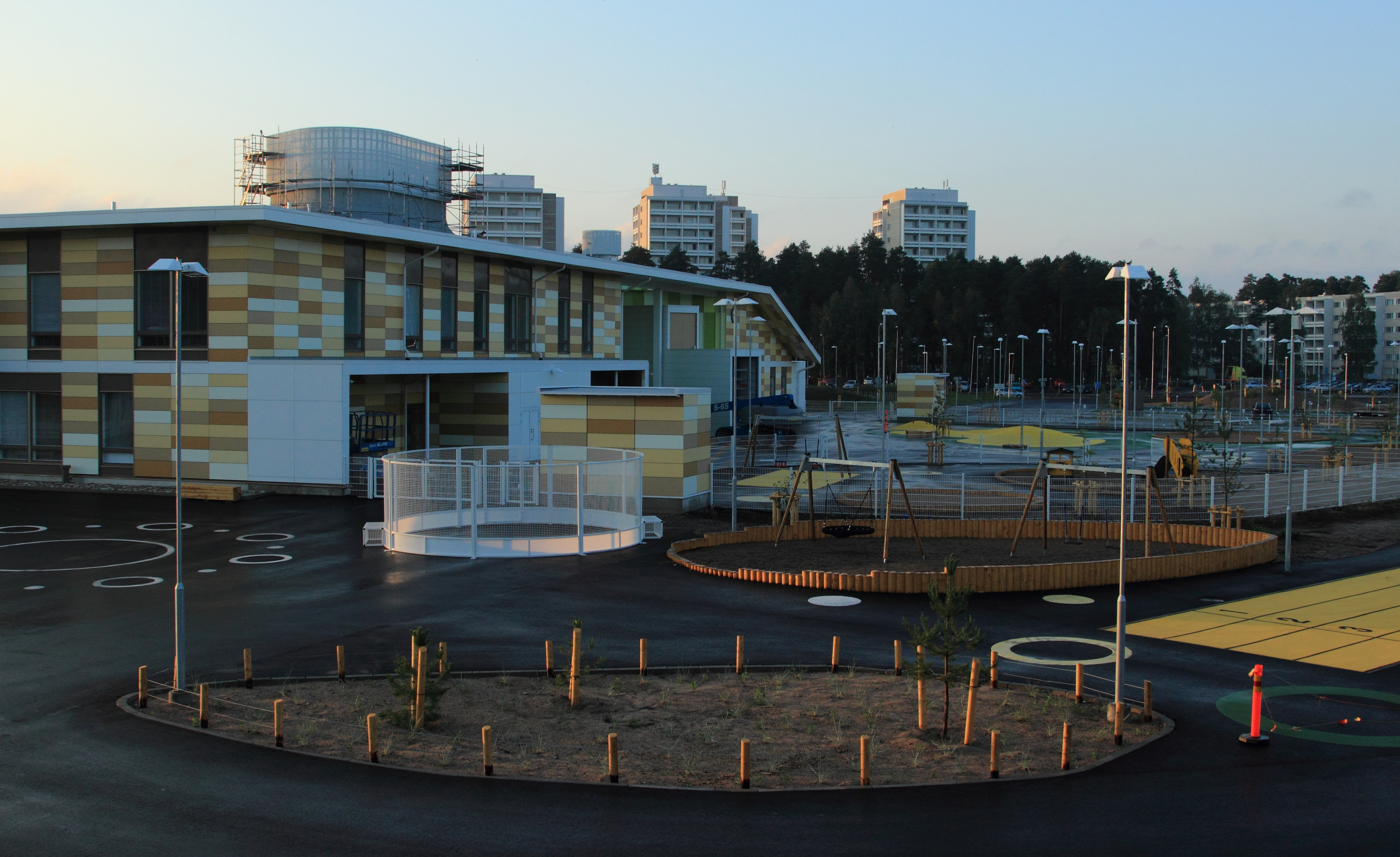

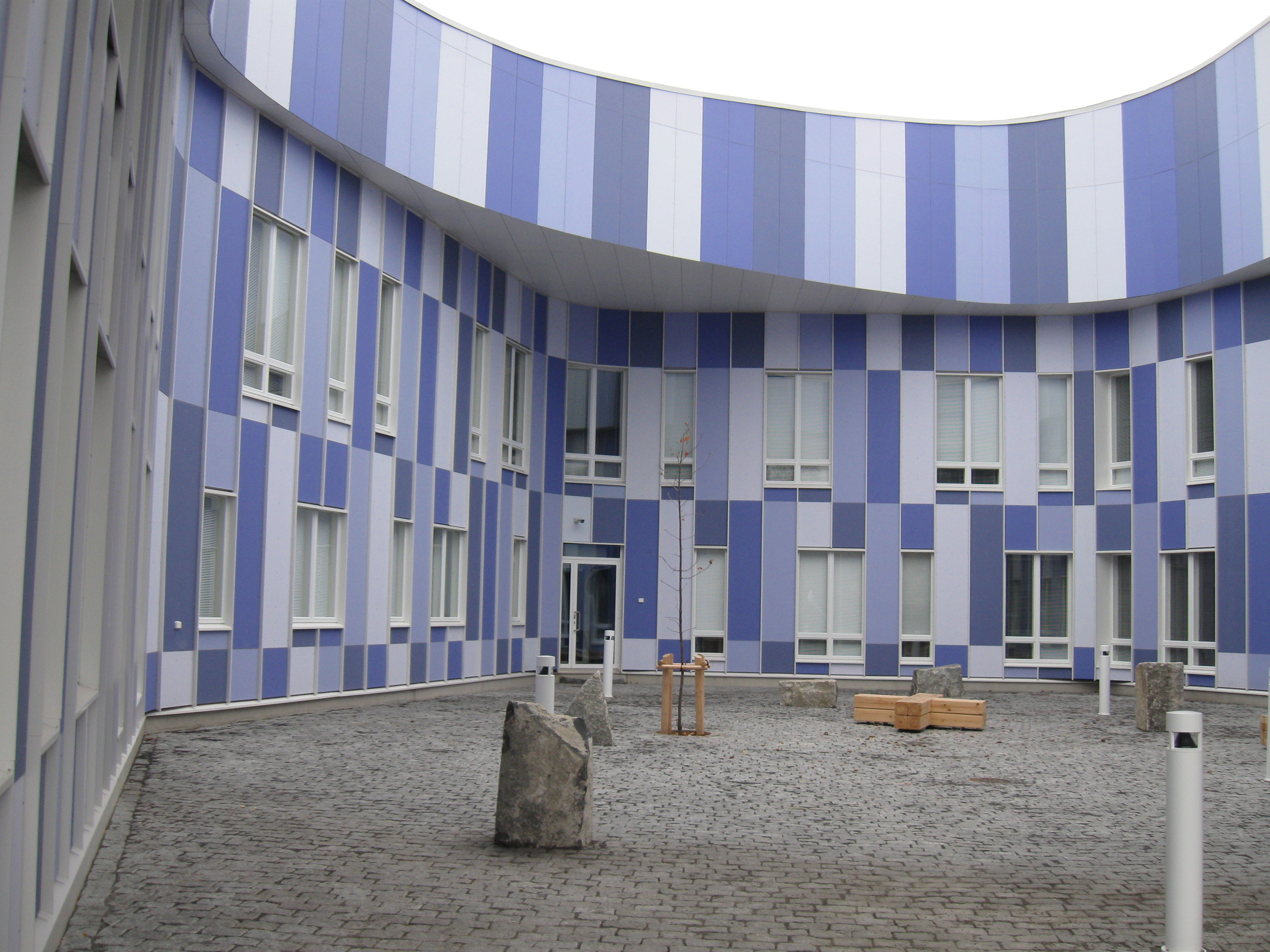

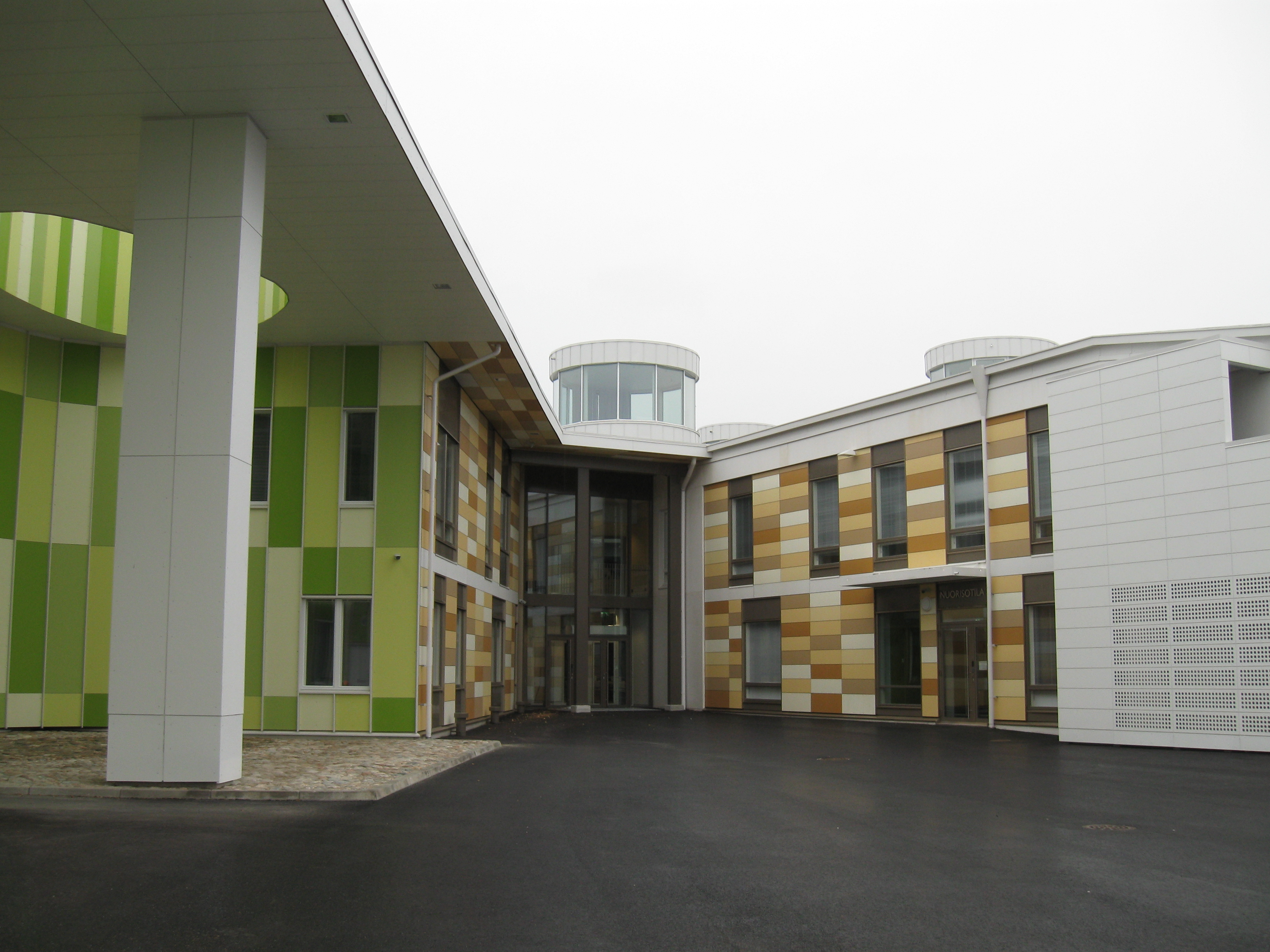
