= Pekka Meriläinen =

Finnish politician

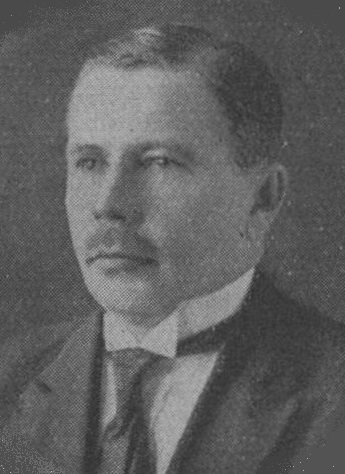
Meriläinen in 1926

Pekka Meriläinen (11 January 1886 – 9 April 1926) was a Finnish stonemason and politician, born in Nurmes. He was a member of the Parliament of Finland from 1924 until his death in 1926, representing the Social Democratic Party of Finland (SDP). He committed suicide by jumping into the Imatrankoski rapids.
