= Kontinkangas =

Coordinates: 65.0061°N 25.5217°E

- District of Oulu
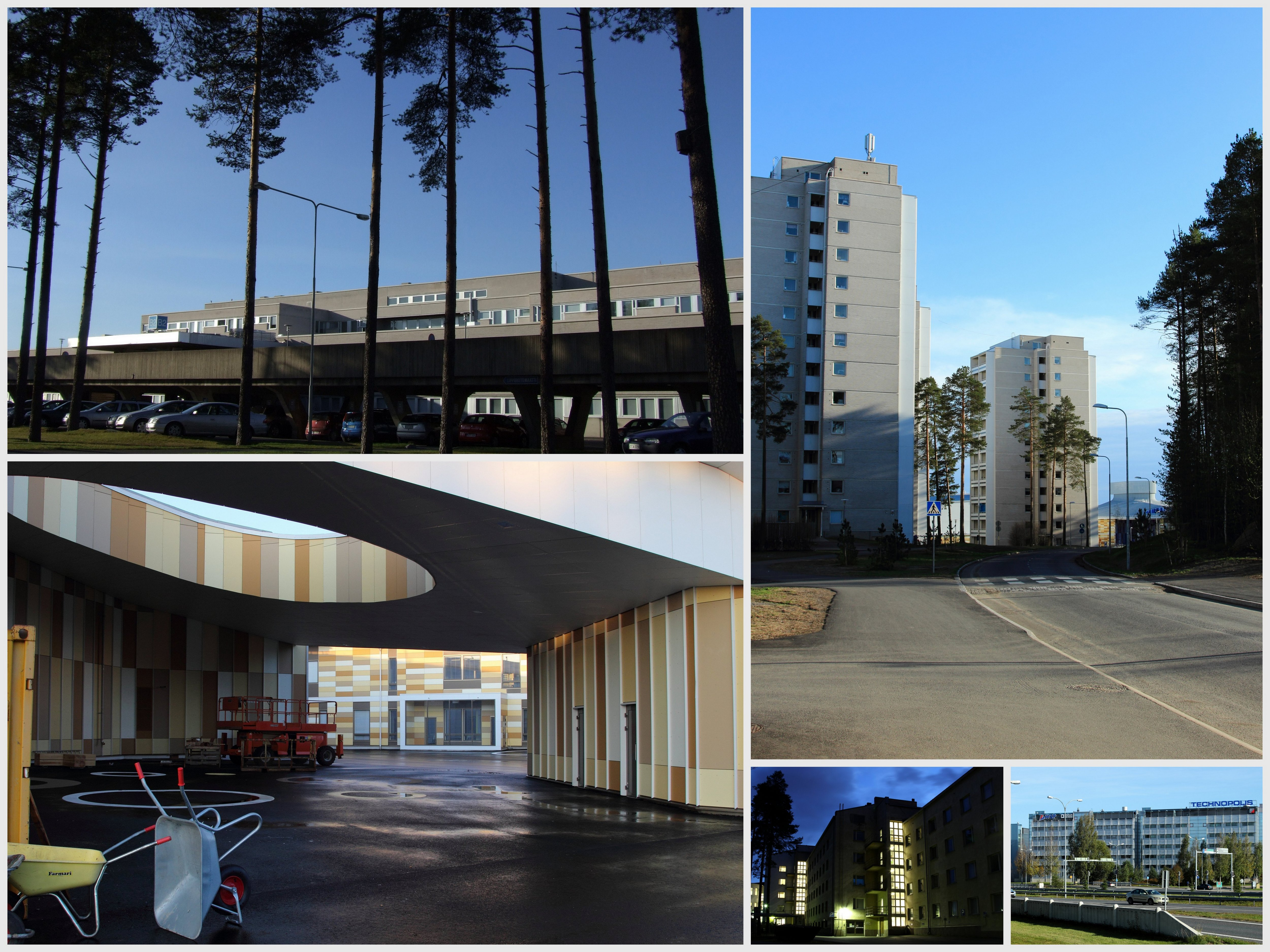
- Interactive map of Kontinkangas
- Country: Finland
- City: Oulu
- Areas of Oulu: Oulunsuu area

Population (2014)
  - Total: 660
- Postal code: 90220

Kontinkangas is a district of Oulu, Finland. It is located to the east of the National road 4 and to the north of the National road 22 about two kilometers from the city centre. Its neighbouring districts are Kaukovainio, Raksila, Peltola and Oulunsuu.

Kontinkangas is primarily an employment area. There were only 660 people living in the area in 2014 while about 9000 employees worked in the district (2011). Most of the major employers are in the healthcare and education industries: Oulu University Hospital, Oulu City Hospital, Faculty of Medicine of the University of Oulu, Oulu University of Applied Sciences, Oulu Vocational College and Technopolis Science Park.
