= Lieksan Hurtat =

Ice hockey team in Finland

Hurtat
- City: Lieksa, Finland
- League: III-Divisioona
- Founded: 1948
- Home arena: Lieksa Areena (capacity: 700)
- Colours
- Head coach: (Finland) Tero Mikkonen
- Captain: (Finland) Jere Honkanen
- Website: http://www.juniorihurtat.fi/

Lieksan Hurtat are an ice hockey team from Lieksa, Finland. They play in III-Divisioona, the fifth highest level of Finnish hockey. Hurtat play their home games at Lieksa Areena. Alongside ice hockey, the club also has a football team. The club has historically also played bandy and pesäpallo.

The team is named after Simon Affleck, known as Simo Hurtta (lit. Simo Hound), a Swedish tax official who was influential in Lieksa.
