= Valtimo =

Former Finnish municipality

- Former municipality
- Valtimon kunta Valtimo kommun
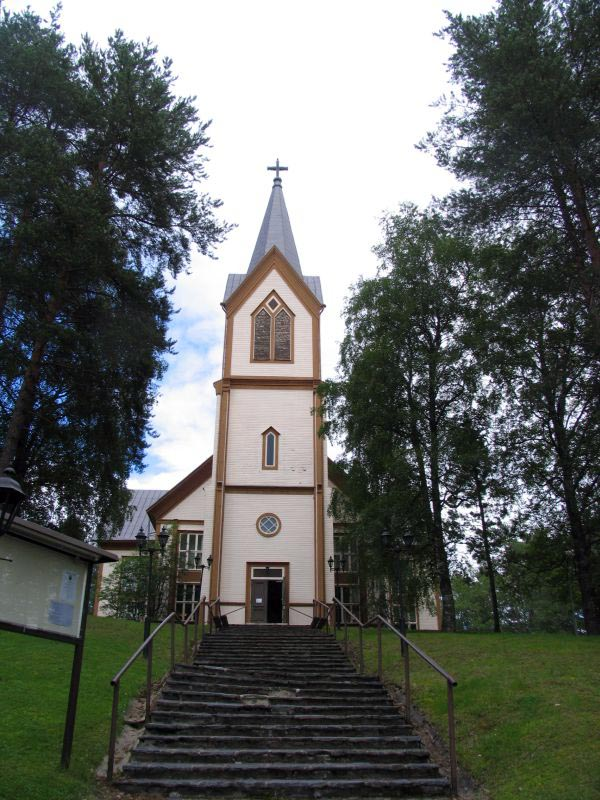
- Valtimo Church

- Coat of arms

- Location of Valtimo in Finland
- Coordinates: 63°40.8′N 028°49′E
- Country: Finland
- Region: North Karelia
- Sub-region: Pielinen sub-region
- Charter: 1910
- Consolidated: 2020

Government
  - Municipal manager: Leena Mustonen

Area
  - Total: 838.07 km^{2} (323.58 sq mi)
  - Land: 800.35 km^{2} (309.02 sq mi)
  - Water: 37.75 km^{2} (14.58 sq mi)

Population (2019-01-31)
  - Total: 2,140
  - Density: 2.67/km^{2} (6.93/sq mi)
- Time zone: UTC+2 (EET)
  - Summer (DST): UTC+3 (EEST)
- Website: www.valtimo.fi

Valtimo is a former municipality of Finland. It was merged with the town of Nurmes on 1 January 2020.

It was located in the North Karelia region. In 2019, the municipality had a population of 2,140 and covered an area of 838.07 square kilometres (323.58 sq mi), of which 37.75 km^{2} (14.58 sq mi) was water. The population density was 2.553/km^{2} (6.613/sq mi). Neighbouring municipalities were Nurmes, Rautavaara and Sotkamo.

The municipality was unilingually Finnish.

== Etymology ==
Valtimo is named after the lake Valtimojärvi. The element Valtimo- is derived from the word valta 'rule, power', likely as multiple small watercourses flow into the lake (compare valtaoja, the main ditch in a drainage system). The word valtimo is also a medical term meaning 'artery'; however, this word was coined by Elias Lönnrot in 1837, though may have been influenced by the place name. Valtimo was separated from Nurmeksen maalaiskunta in 1908; until then, the central village of Valtimo had been known as Haapajärvi or Haapakylä.

== Villages ==
Prior to its consolidation into Nurmes in 2020, Valtimo consisted of the following villages:

- urban: Valtimon kirkonkylä
- rural: Elomäki, Halmejärvi, Hirsikangas, Kalliojärvi, Karhunpää, Koiravaara, Koppelo (Koppelojärvi), Nuolijärvi, Pajukoski, Puukari, Rasimäki, Rumo, Sivakkajoki, Sivakkavaara, Verkkojoki, Ylä-Valtimo

The villages of Karhunpää, Ylä-Valtimo and Rasimäki have been classified as nationally valuable landscape areas (valtakunnallisesti arvokas maisema-alue) since 1995. All three are well-preserved agricultural areas. Karhunpää and Ylä-Valtimo are villages built around multiple lakes and connecting rivers settled between the 17th and 18th centuries. Rasimäki, which was largely settled by refugees from Suojärvi after World War II, is located in a single river valley, which is atypical for the region.

== People ==
- Aki Karvonen (born 1957)
- Jarmo Kärnä (born 1958)
