= Åre River =

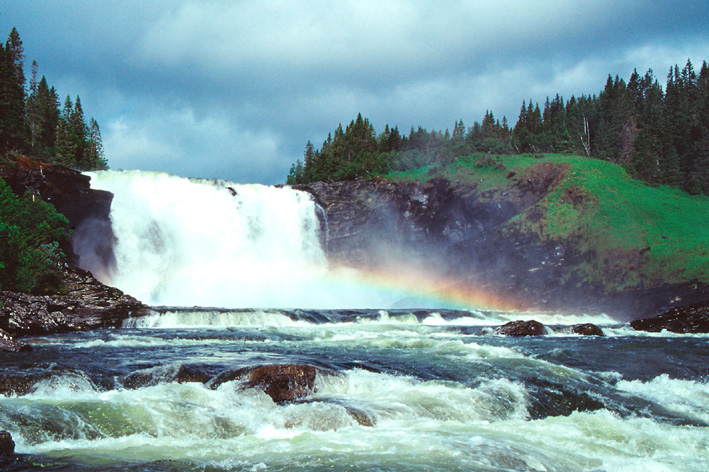
- Tännforsen in the Åre River.
- Native name: Åreälven (Swedish)

Location
- Country: Sweden
- Province: Jämtland
- City: Åre

Physical characteristics
- Source: Skalsvattnet
- Mouth: Liten
  - coordinates: 63°20′02″N 13°26′45″E
- Length: 70 km (43 mi)

Åre River (Swedish: Åreälven) is a river in Sweden.
