= Jakob Stenius den äldre =

Jakob Stenius the Elder, born 14 March 1704 in Ulvsby parish in Finland, died 20 January 1766, was a Finnish priest and agronomist; father of Jakob Stenius the younger.

Stenius was a parish priest in Pielisjärvi in Karelia in Finland. He gained a great reputation through his extensive marsh draining and cultivation, and the farmers therefore gave him the nickname Korpi-Jaakko (Finnish for Marsh Jack). He also appeared as an agronomic writer with a brief account of bogs and marshes and their usefulness (1742). As Augustin Ehrensvärd's assistant, he also participated for some time in the management of the river purification work in Pori County. He also worked for measures to be taken for the defense of the borders in eastern Finland, for the more appropriate arrangement of taxation and for the division of the parishes in the said part of the country. He had a fierce and headstrong temper and was constantly in dispute with his cathedral chapter.
