= Jakob Stenius den yngre =

Jakob Stenius the Younger, called Koski-Jaakko (Finnish for "Waterfall Jake"), born 2 February 1732, died 5 February 1809, was a Finnish priest and engineer, son of Jakob Stenius the elder.

In 1757 Stenius, through his graduation dissertation on controlling waterfalls and rapids, became so noteworthy that shortly afterwards he was called to be the leader of the work on rapids and waterfalls in progress in Finland.

He was ordained in 1767 and succeeded his father as pastor in Pielisjärvi, where he worked eagerly for draining and lowering lakes within the large parish, so that vast tracts of land were gained for cultivation.

In 1761, the Royal Swedish Academy of Sciences awarded him a gold medal for a book on the best way to free meadows from moss. He played a significant role in the defense of Pielisjärvi parish during the Russo-Swedish War (1788–1790), but was accused for a time, wrongly, of having been in secret alliance with the enemy.
