= Nurmes =

- Town
- Nurmeksen kaupunki Nurmes stad
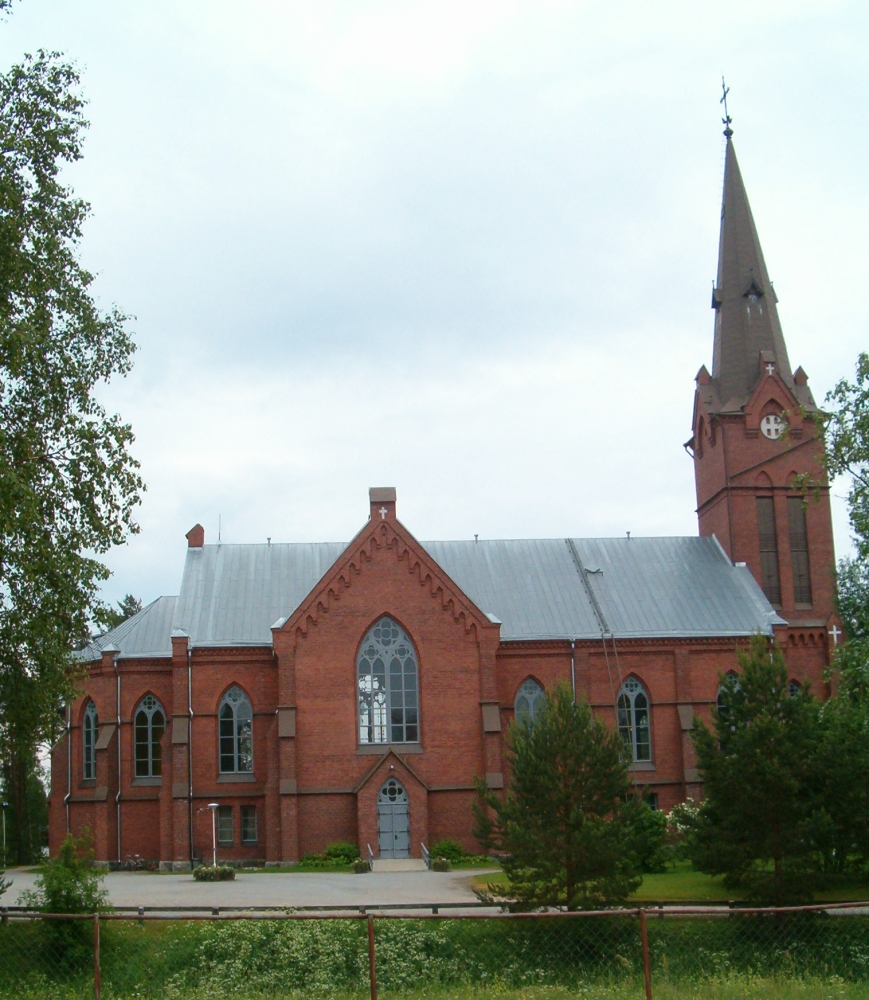
- Nurmes Church

- Coat of arms

- Location of Nurmes in Finland
- Interactive map of Nurmes
- Coordinates: 63°32.7′N 029°08′E
- Country: Finland
- Region: North Karelia
- Sub-region: Pielinen Karelia
- Charter: 1810
- Town privileges: 1973

Government
  - Town manager: Pasi Parkkinen

Area (2018-01-01)
  - Total: 1,854.78 km^{2} (716.13 sq mi)
  - Land: 2,401.35 km^{2} (927.17 sq mi)
  - Water: 253.7 km^{2} (98.0 sq mi)
  - Rank: 38th largest in Finland

Population (2025-12-31)
  - Total: 8,760
  - Rank: 109th largest in Finland
  - Density: 3.65/km^{2} (9.5/sq mi)

Population by native language
  - Finnish: 95.9% (official)
  - Others: 4.1%

Population by age
  - 0 to 14: 11.4%
  - 15 to 64: 52.7%
  - 65 or older: 35.8%
- Time zone: UTC+02:00 (EET)
  - Summer (DST): UTC+03:00 (EEST)
- Website: www.nurmes.fi

Nurmes is a town and municipality of Finland, located in the county of North Karelia. The town has a population of 8,760 (31 December 2025) and covers an area of 1,854.78 square kilometres (716.13 sq mi) of which 253.7 km^{2} (98.0 sq mi) is water. The population density is 3.65 inhabitants per square kilometre (9.5/sq mi). Neighbouring municipalities are Juuka, Kuhmo, Lieksa, Rautavaara and Sotkamo.

Nurmes railway station is the northern terminus of a twice-daily VR passenger train service from Joensuu. The service has been under threat of closure but is currently part of rail services that the Ministry of Transport and Communications requires VR to run in exchange for its monopoly on more attractive routes. The agreement is currently valid through 2030.

Karelian village and spa hotel Break Sokos Hotel Bomba are situated in Nurmes. Bomba Karelian Village is a tourist destination for Karelian construction and food culture and traditions. Hotel Hyvärilä Youth and Holiday Centre, and Pielis-Golf golf course are located near the Bomba area.

== History ==
The former town municipality of Valtimo was annexed into Nurmes on 1 January 2020.

== Karelian nest ==
The municipality is officially unilingually Finnish, but in 2009, Finland's first Karelian language "nest" (pre-school immersion group) was established in Nurmes.

== Geography ==
Nurmes is located in Finnish Karelia on the shore of lake Pielinen, next to the counties of Kainuu and North Savo. The nearest major cities by road are Kuopio (128 km), Joensuu (127 km) and Kajaani (113 km) where the nearest airports are located. The railway from Nurmes to Joensuu is 160 km and runs through Lieksa. Helsinki is 518 kilometers by road and can be reached by rail by changing trains in Joensuu. Nurmes is close to Tahko Tourist Center (93 km), Vuokatti Ski Resort (88 km), Koli National Park (78 km), Tiilikkajärvi National Park (56 km) and Hiidenportti National Park (44 km).

The nature of Nurmes is characterized by hilly landscapes, forests and lakes. There are 409 lakes in Nurmes. The largest and the most famous of these is lake Pielinen. Species such as perch, grayling, pike, lake salmon, whitefish, lake trout are found in Pielinen. Fishing is possible with a licence that can be bought from shops.

There are three hiking areas in Nurmes:

- Raesärkkä area consists of a 5.9 km^{2} protected forest and a 1.2 km^{2} recreational forest. It has a grazing field, marshes, lakes and rivers.
- Mujejärvi area consists of a 20 km^{2} hiking area with cliffs, ridges, gorges and lakes.
- Lake Peurajärvi is suitable for families with children and fishermen. There are many lakes, ponds and rivers in the area, with easy access routes.

There are many different mushroom, wild herb and berry species in the forests. There is Freedom to roam in Finland.

=== Climate ===
Nurmes experiences a continental climate with four seasons. Winters are cold and the average temperature from November to March is below -5 °C. On average, the snow season lasts 4–5 months from November to April. North Karelia is one of the snowiest regions in Finland, with a typical March snow depth of more than 50 cm. During the darkest time of the year, the sun is above the horizon for about four hours.

Summers are cool to warm and temperatures change very rapidly during the summer. During the brightest time of the year, the sun is above the horizon for about 20 hours.

Climate data for Nurmes Valtimo (1991-2020 normals, extremes 1971-present)
Month	Jan	Feb	Mar	Apr	May	Jun	Jul	Aug	Sep	Oct	Nov	Dec	Year
Record high °C (°F)	7.9 (46.2)	8.2 (46.8)	12.7 (54.9)	21.0 (69.8)	29.3 (84.7)	32.5 (90.5)	34.8 (94.6)	32.8 (91.0)	26.0 (78.8)	19.4 (66.9)	10.8 (51.4)	7.6 (45.7)	34.8 (94.6)
Mean daily maximum °C (°F)	−6.1 (21.0)	−5.5 (22.1)	−0.1 (31.8)	6.2 (43.2)	13.6 (56.5)	18.7 (65.7)	21.5 (70.7)	19.0 (66.2)	13.1 (55.6)	5.5 (41.9)	−0.1 (31.8)	−3.5 (25.7)	6.9 (44.4)
Daily mean °C (°F)	−9.5 (14.9)	−9.4 (15.1)	−4.6 (23.7)	1.5 (34.7)	8.3 (46.9)	13.8 (56.8)	16.6 (61.9)	14.2 (57.6)	9.1 (48.4)	3.0 (37.4)	−2.2 (28.0)	−6.3 (20.7)	2.9 (37.2)
Mean daily minimum °C (°F)	−13.3 (8.1)	−13.7 (7.3)	−9.5 (14.9)	−3.3 (26.1)	2.9 (37.2)	8.6 (47.5)	11.7 (53.1)	9.9 (49.8)	5.6 (42.1)	0.6 (33.1)	−4.6 (23.7)	−9.5 (14.9)	−1.2 (29.8)
Record low °C (°F)	−42.0 (−43.6)	−42.0 (−43.6)	−36.0 (−32.8)	−23.2 (−9.8)	−10.4 (13.3)	−1.0 (30.2)	2.6 (36.7)	−2.5 (27.5)	−8.0 (17.6)	−19.0 (−2.2)	−33.0 (−27.4)	−38.0 (−36.4)	−42.0 (−43.6)
Average precipitation mm (inches)	40 (1.6)	35 (1.4)	31 (1.2)	29 (1.1)	49 (1.9)	64 (2.5)	80 (3.1)	65 (2.6)	62 (2.4)	59 (2.3)	54 (2.1)	49 (1.9)	618 (24.3)
Average precipitation days	10	9	8	7	9	11	10	10	10	11	11	11	117
Source 1: Finnish Meteorological Institute
Source 2: Record highs and lows

=== Villages ===
As of 2020, after the merger with the former town municipality of Valtimo, Nurmes consists of the following populated places:

Nurmes kauppala section

- urban:
- rural:

Nurmes maalaiskunta section

- urban:
- rural:

Juukann section

- urban:
- rural:

Rautavaara section

- urban:
- rural:

Kuhmoon section

- urban:
- rural:

Valtimo section

- urban: Valtimon kirkonkylä
- rural: Elomäki, Haapakylä kirkonkylä, Halmejärvi, Hirsikangas, Kalliojärvi, Karhunpää, Koiravaara, Koppelo (Koppelojärvi), Nuolijärvi, Pajukoski, Puukari, Rasimäki, Rumo, Sivakkajoki, Sivakkavaara, Verkkojoki, Ylä-Valtimo

== Economy ==
Key industries of Nurmes are wood industry, food industry and metal and mechanical engineering.

Wood industry is the most significant industrial sector of the region in terms of turnover and employees. The products manufactured here include sawn and planed wood, glued beams, impregnated wooden poles, and high-quality special cardboards.

Nurmes has strong expertise in bakery, fish and meat processing sectors. The most sold signature products have been bread in various forms, and gluten-free bakery products.

Metal and mechanical engineering companies operate as subcontractors or manufacture products under their own trademarks. They develop innovative products & processes and search actively for new subcontracting opportunities.

Nurmes has Green Industry Area (Nurmes GIA) which is a business district that offers plots, modern infrastructure, and logistic services. Nurmes GIA is a platform e.g. for manufacturing and logistics of bio-based chemical products. The areal zoning and environmental impact assessment have been designed to benefit the start-up of forest-based industries and circular economy.

== Culture ==
Nurmes was declared Finland's Christmas Song City in 2005 and the European Christmas Song City in 2009. A lot of musical activities, such as concerts and events, are organized during Christmas in Nurmes.

During the summertime there are cultural events, such as Nurmes Summer Music, which takes place in the beginning of July.

Finnish composer P. J. Hannikainen was from Nurmes. A local theatre, street and playschool are named after him. He has own monument in Nurmes city centre.

Nurmes-talo is the Nurmes Cultural Center, and features a library, cinema, art gallery and a museum. Nurmes-talo underwent a renovation in June 2019 and reopened on August 9, 2021. The Ikola Museum, open during summer months, is an outdoor museum showcasing local agricultural heritage.

Nurmes is the home town of the main protagonist of the acclaimed 2002 Aki Kaurismäki film Mies vailla menneisyyttä (The Man Without a Past).

== Notable people ==
- Elli Saurio (1899–1966), Economist
- Mikko Collan, military officer and politician
- P. J. Hannikainen, composer
- Jani Hartikainen, football player
- Juha Holopainen, skier
- Ilkka Laitinen, military officer and government executive
- Pekka Meriläinen, stonemason and politician
- Urho Peltonen, javelin thrower
- Olli Soikkeli, jazz guitarist

== International relations ==
=== Twin towns — Sister cities ===
Nurmes is twinned with:

- Laholm, Sweden
- Møn, Denmark
- Ørsta, Norway
- Volda, Norway
- Segezha, Russia
