= Ahmovaara =

- Village
- Location in Finland Ahmovaara (Finland)
- Coordinates: 63.097°N 29.618°E
- Country: Finland
- Region: North Karelia
- Sub-region: Pielinen Karelia
- Municipality: Juuka

Population (2023)
  - Total: ~400
- Time zone: UTC+2 ({{{timezone}}}EET)
  - Summer (DST): UTC+3 ({{{timezone_DST}}}EESTEEST)

Ahmovaara is a village in Juuka, Finland, located in the southeastern part of the municipality along the Finnish national road 6, near Koli. As of 2023, it had a population of about 400.

== Geography ==
Ahmovaara is located in the southeastern part of Juuka, along the Finnish national road 6. Houses in the village are concentrated around the road Ahmovaarantie, the northern part of which is the most densely populated. The distance to central Juuka is about 25 kilometers (16 mi), while that to the village of Koli (part of Lieksa) and to the village of Nunnanlahti between Ahmovaara and central Juuka is about 10 kilometers (6.2 mi).

Lakes in or near Ahmovaara include Savijärvi, Tuopanjärvi and Tyni; the major lake Pielinen lies further north. Most lakes around the village are oligotrophic, with the exception of Katainen, which is almost completely overgrown. The Koli National Park is also located nearby.

== History ==
Ahmovaara was settled in the mid-17th century. The name, meaning 'wolverine hill', was first mentioned in 1682 as Achmonwara and originally referred to the hill the village is located on. Before Juuka became a separate parish in 1873, Ahmovaara was part of Pielisjärvi.

The regional council of North Karelia chose Ahmovaara as the regional village of the year in 2022.

== Services ==
Until 2024, the main service center of Ahmovaara was Kolinportti, which comprised a gas station, a restaurant, a pub, a post office, a pharmacy and various stores. The postmodern building of Kolinportti was designed by architects Juhani Katainen and Olavi Koponen and finished in 1992. In 2024, the owners sought to demolish the building, as renovating it would have been too expensive; while it is classified as a regionally significant built environment, it is not a protected building. With the exception of the gas station, all services were closed in December of that year. In November 2025, Kolinportti was bought by a company based in Koli. Various basic services are to be reopened starting in 2026.

A village school was established in 1895. Its most recent main building was finished in 1928. By 2017, the school building had fallen into disrepair and the school was officially closed in 2018. Ahmovaara became part of the Nunnanlahti school district, though some children also went to school in Koli. After the closure of the Nunnanlahti school in 2022, the Koli school (yhtenäiskoulu, comprising all grades of peruskoulu) has been the closest school to Ahmovaara. The old school building was sold to a local sports club in 2018.

A community building, built by members of various local associations, was finished in 2019.

== Notable buildings ==
Aside from Kolinportti and the school building, other locally notable buildings include Tanskasen kauppa, a former store built in 1919. The home of poet Viljo Tuomela (real name Matti Hyttinen, 1895–1977), called Tuomelan Tupa, is located in the village and is currently a home museum.
