= Koli (village), Finland =

Koli
- Village
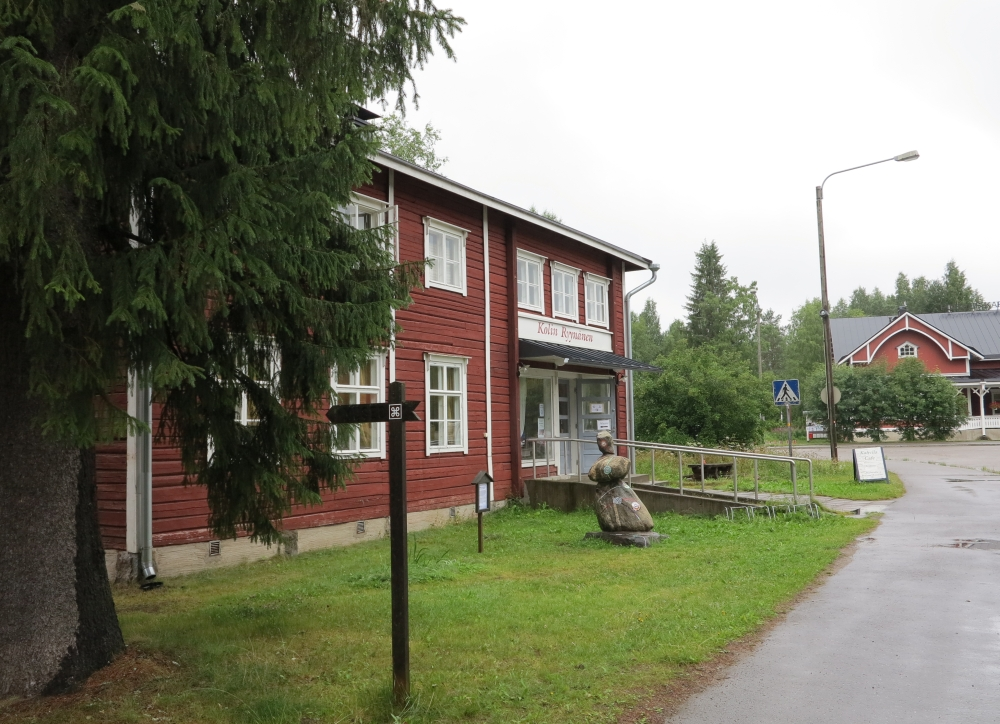
- Kolin Ryynänen, a local cultural center.

- Location in Finland Koli (Finland)
- Coordinates: 63.114°N 29.778°E
- Country: Finland
- Region: North Karelia
- Sub-region: Pielinen Karelia
- Town: Lieksa
- Former municipality: Pielisjärvi
- Time zone: UTC+2 (EET)
  - Summer (DST): UTC+3 (EEST)

Koli is a village in Lieksa, Finland, located by the hill of the same name and the Koli National Park. It lies southwest of central Lieksa near the border with Juuka and Kontiolahti, being separated from the rest of the municipality by the lake Pielinen. Until 1973, Koli was part of the municipality of Pielisjärvi.

Koli was settled in the early 18th century. Traditionally an agricultural village, tourism began gaining importance in the 20th century.

== Etymology ==
The village of Koli is named after the hill Koli, whose name is derived from a dialectal word koli meaning 'bald, bare', a loan from Russian голый 'bare, naked'. It has been used as a settlement name since 1763.

== Geography ==
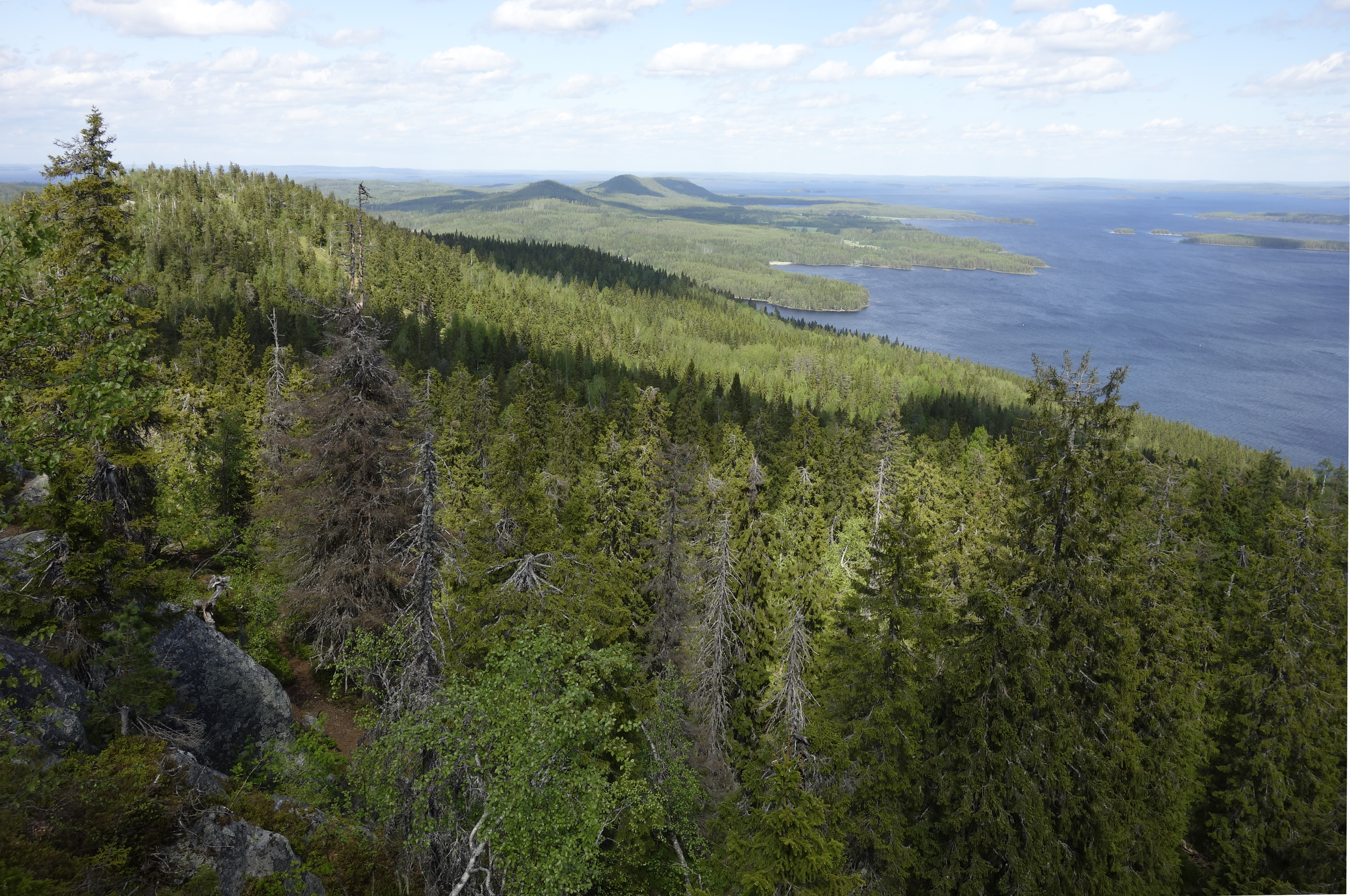
View from Koli towards Ipatti.

Koli is located in the southwestern part of Lieksa, near the border with the municipalities of Juuka and Kontiolahti, and is separated from the rest of Lieksa by the lake Pielinen. The village's center lies northwest of the eponymous hill and the Koli National Park. No direct land access between Koli and the rest of Lieksa exists. A 7-kilometer (4.3 mi) ice road over the Pielinen connecting Koli to Vuonislahti has been plowed since 1980, shortening the trip between the villages by over 50 kilometers (31 mi). It is one of three official (i.e. managed by the Finnish Transport Infrastructure Agency) ice roads in Finland.

The village is part of the nationally valuable landscape area (valtakunnallisesti arvokas maisema-alue) of Koli. The landscape includes multiple forested hills reaching a height of over 200 meters (660 ft) above the surface of the Pielinen.

== History ==
The area around Koli had no recorded permanent inhabitants until the 17th century, though place names derived from Sámi languages are found in the vicinity of the hill, suggesting a historical Sámi presence in the area. Later, much of the land was owned by the villagers of Vuonislahti on the opposite shore of the Pielinen, who practiced slash-and-burn agriculture and gathered fodder from meadows in the area. The first recorded settler in Koli was Antti Meriläinen, who lived in the area from 1679 until 1686, when he returned to his home village of Vuonislahti. Permanent settlement emerged in the first half of the 18th century, when eight farms were established west of the hill. In the 1830s, during the Great Partition, Koli became an official village comprising 19 farms.

The villagers of Koli were initially engaged in slash-and-burn agriculture and fishing, with settled agriculture and animal husbandry gaining importance later. The earliest permanent fields were cleared around bodies of water, such as the river Lahnajoki. Slash-and-burn agriculture was still practiced to some extent until the mid-20th century.

In the early 1900s, Koli started to become a significant travel destination. As the number of people visiting the area grew, a road was built from Koli to Ahmovaara, which in turn is located by a highway between Juuka and Joensuu. Much of the modern center of Koli was built around this time. Tourism has become a significant livelihood in the village alongside agriculture and forestry, with villagers giving up the latter often making a living from the former. Agriculture in Koli has gradually lost its importance; as of 2021, the amount of cultivated land in the area had decreased to about 30 percent from its peak in the 20th century, with many former fields being forested.

Koli became part of Lieksa in 1973 after the municipality of Pielisjärvi was consolidated with it.

== Services ==
=== School ===
There is a school in Koli for all grades of peruskoulu (0–9). The school was established in 1896. Its current main building dates to the 1950s. Despite its small size, it was expanded to include the upper grades of peruskoulu (7–9) in 2011.

=== Tourism ===
As of 2009, the Koli National Park was the second most visited national park in Finland, with some 120,000 people visiting it yearly. Services for travelers include a hotel of the Sokos Hotels chain and rentable cottages. The first traveler accommodation in Koli was a lodge near the summit of the hill, built in 1896 along with the first guided nature trail in the country.

== Church ==
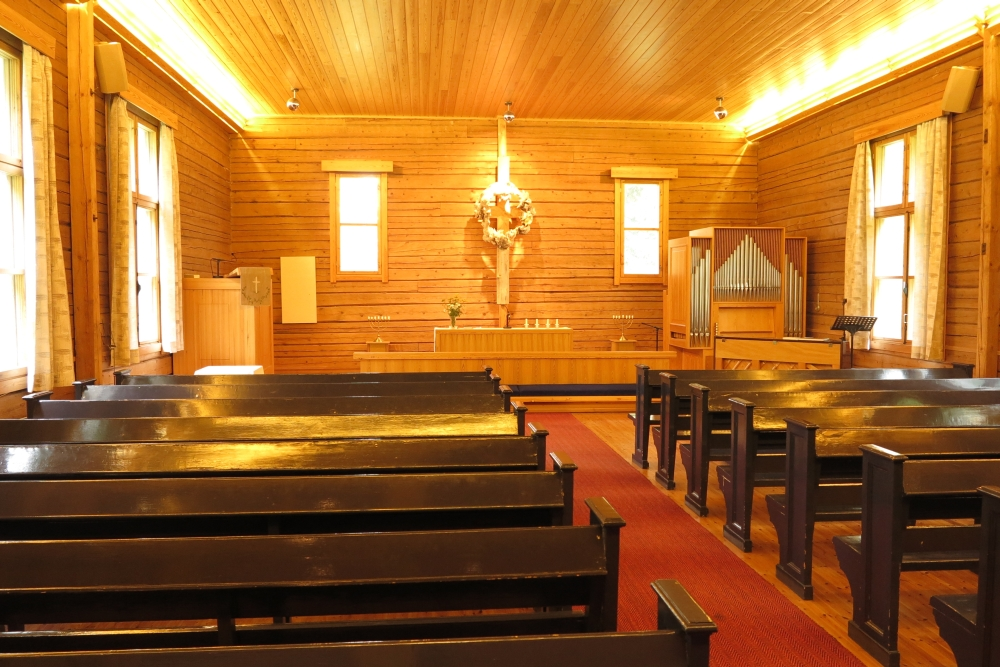
Interior of the Koli church

The Evangelical Lutheran church of Koli was established in 1930 as a chapel by a local Christian association and began to be referred to as a church after being given to the parish of Pielisjärvi. The church's altarpiece was made by sculptor Eva Ryynänen.
