= Nunnanlahti =

- Village
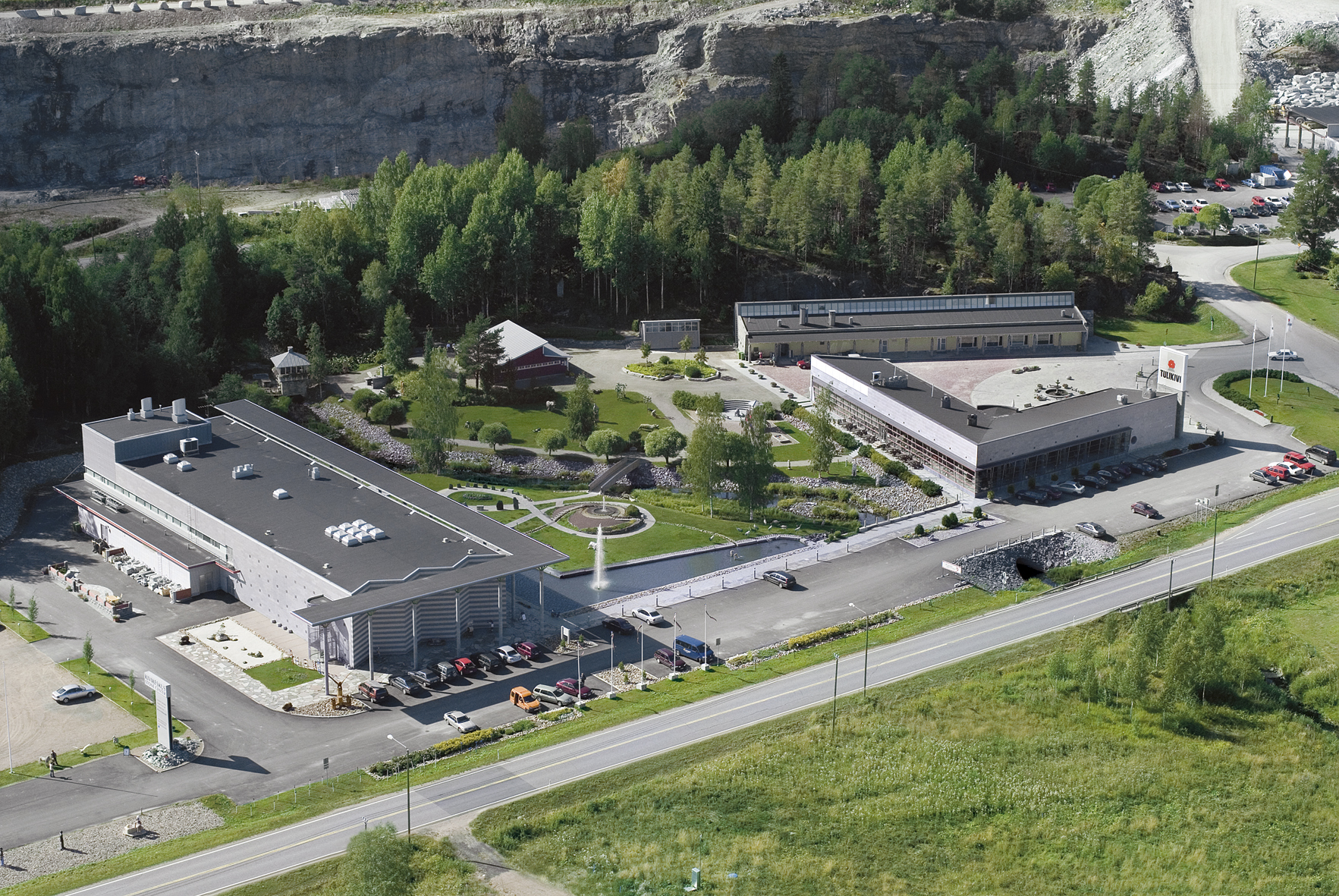
- Kivikeskus and a former quarry

- Location in Finland Nunnanlahti (Finland)
- Coordinates: 63.177°N 29.435°E
- Country: Finland
- Region: North Karelia
- Sub-region: Pielinen Karelia
- Municipality: Juuka

Population (2017)
  - Total: ~480
- Time zone: UTC+2 (EET)
  - Summer (DST): UTC+3 (EEST)

Nunnanlahti is a village in Juuka, Finland, located along the Finnish national road 6 and on the shore of lake Pielinen. The distance to the municipal center is about 15 kilometers (9.3 mi). As of 2017, the village had a population of about 480.

Nunnanlahti has been inhabited since the 17th century. Between the late 19th and early 20th centuries, the village grew around soapstone quarries, which are still important for the local economy.

== Etymology ==
The village of Nunnanlahti is named after the eponymous bay of Pielinen. The name was first mentioned in 1690 as Lunnanlax; until the late 18th century, the name appears in forms beginning with Lunna-, a variant that is still sometimes used today (Lunnanlahti), a result of dissimilation also found in e.g. lumero, a variant of numero 'number'.

The name is considered to be derived from a Sámi male given name Nunná. The word nunna also means 'nun', but this word was not traditionally used in the area; the word used was instead sirnihta (from Russian черница), still found in some nearby place names.

== Geography ==
The center of Nunnanlahti is located southeast of the municipal center, on the southern shore of the Nunnanlahti bay of Pielinen and along the Finnish national road 6. The distance to the center of Juuka is about 15 kilometers (9.3 mi).

== History ==
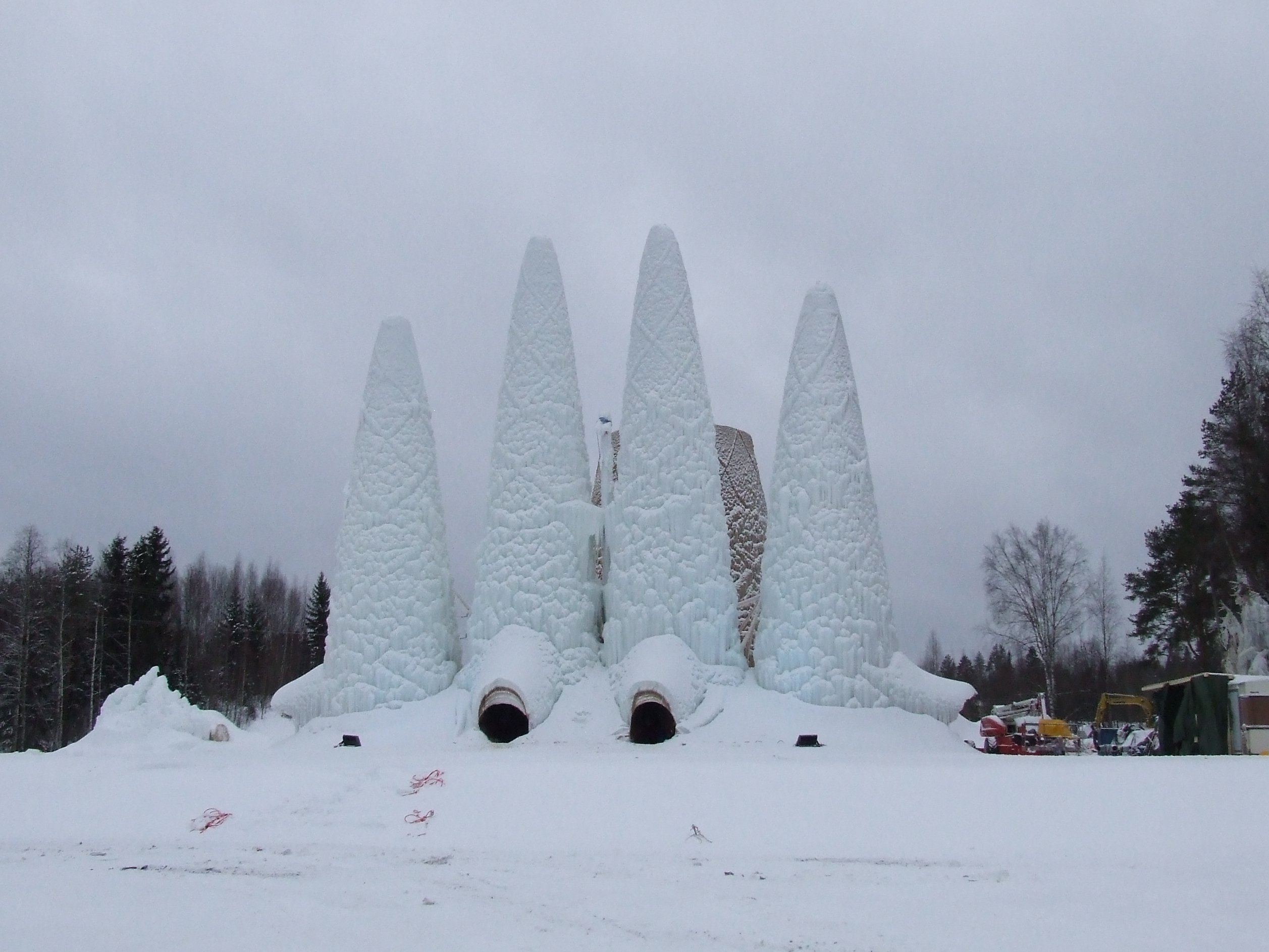
Sagrada Família replica in January 2015

Nunnanlahti was settled in the 17th century. It was a typical agricultural village until the discovery of soapstone deposits in the late 19th century. Before Juuka became a separate parish in 1873, Nunnanlahti was part of Pielisjärvi. Starting in the 1880s, Nunnanlahti grew around the stone industry; housing for workers and office buildings were mainly built in the beginning of the 20th century, and many of these buildings are still standing today. A steam power plant, used to power a sawmill, was finished in 1910.

In January 2014, students of the Dutch Eindhoven University of Technology built a pykrete (ice composite) dome in Nunnanlahti to test the material's applications, measuring 30 meters (98 ft) in diameter and 10 meters (33 ft) in height. Between December 2014 and January 2015, a 30-meter (98 ft) tall replica of Sagrada Família was built in its place, being opened to the public on 24 January 2015. By March 2015, when it had already largely melted, about 10,000 people had visited the structure.

== Economy and services ==
Nunnanlahti is still an industrial village in the 2020s. Soapstone products, such as fireplaces and ovens, are produced in the village by Nunnauuni and Tulikivi Oyj. In 2020, 84% of the 163 total people with jobs in the village were employed in the secondary sector. Kivikeskus, a 2,600-square-meter (28,000 sq ft) building designed to house various businesses and exhibits related to the local soapstone industry, was opened in 2003. The foundation which owned the building went bankrupt in 2017 and it was acquired by the municipality of Juuka, who sold it to Tulikivi in June 2026.

Nunnanlahti had its own school until 2022, after which the closest school to the village has been in central Juuka. The main building of the Nunnanlahti school was built in 1909.
