= Timonen =

Timonen is a Finnish surname. Notable people with the surname include:

- Esa Timonen (1925–2015), Finnish politician
- Jussi Timonen (born 1983), Finnish professional ice hockey defenceman
- Kimmo Timonen (born 1975), Finnish professional ice hockey defenceman
- Oiva Timonen (1920–1998), Finnish Olympic wrestler
- Roosa Timonen (born 1997), Finnish tennis player
- Sakari Timonen (born 1957), Finnish blogger
