= Carelia =

Carelia may refer to:

- Carelia (gastropod), a genus of snails
- 1391 Carelia, an asteroid
- Karelia, name of a region in Finland and Russia
- Karelia (cigarettes), Greek brand of cigarettes.

== See also ==
- Karelia (disambiguation)
