= 1536 Pielinen =

Stony Florian asteroid

Discovery
- Discovered by: Y. Väisälä
- Discovery site: Turku Observatory
- Discovery date: 18 September 1939

Designations
- Named after: Pielinen (lake)
- Alternative designations: 1939 SE · 1929 RZ; 1931 ED · 1934 CW; 1939 TP · 1939 UK; 1952 RW · A903 SF; A916 RA
- Minor planet category: main-belt · Flora

Orbital characteristics
- Epoch 4 September 2017 (JD 2458000.5)
- Uncertainty parameter 0
- Observation arc: 113.68 yr (41,521 days)
- Aphelion: 2.6342 AU
- Perihelion: 1.7736 AU
- Semi-major axis: 2.2039 AU
- Eccentricity: 0.1953
- Orbital period (sidereal): 3.27 yr (1,195 days)
- Mean anomaly: 295.85°
- Mean motion: 0° 18^{m} 4.32^{s} / day
- Inclination: 1.5344°
- Longitude of ascending node: 195.69°
- Argument of perihelion: 170.76°

Physical characteristics
- Dimensions: 7.38±1.62 km 7.82 km (calculated); 7.934±0.037 km 7.975±0.109 km
- Synodic rotation period: 66.1±0.1 h 66.22 h (Note: Pravec (2011) web: rotation period 66.22 hours with a brightness amplitude of 0.85 mag. Quality Code: 3. Summary figures for (1536) Pielinen at Collaborative Asteroid Lightcurve Link (CALL)); 66.34±0.02 h (Note: Stephens (2011) web. Observations in September 2011, gave a rotation period of 66.34±0.02 hours with a brightness amplitude of 0.80 mag. Quality Code of 3-. Summary figures for (1536) Pielinen at Collaborative Asteroid Lightcurve Link (CALL)); 67.43±0.06 h
- Geometric albedo: 0.24 (assumed); 0.253±0.017; 0.2557±0.0662; 0.30±0.21
- Spectral type: S
- Absolute magnitude (H): 12.57±0.52 · 12.6 · 12.7

1536 Pielinen (provisional designation 1939 SE) is a stony Florian asteroid from the inner regions of the asteroid belt, approximately 7.8 kilometers in diameter. It was discovered on 18 September 1939, by Finnish astronomer Yrjö Väisälä at Turku Observatory, Southwest Finland. It was later named for Finnish lake Pielinen.

== Classification and orbit ==
Pielinen is a member of the Flora family, a large group of stony S-type asteroids. It orbits the Sun in the inner main-belt at a distance of 1.8–2.6 AU once every 3 years and 3 months (1,195 days). Its orbit has an eccentricity of 0.20 and an inclination of 2° with respect to the ecliptic. Pielinen was first identified as A903 SF at Heidelberg in 1903, extending the body's observation arc by 36 years prior to its official discovery observation.

== Lightcurves ==
From September to November 2011, four rotational lightcurves of Pielinen were obtained from photometric observations. One lightcurve analysis gave a rotation period of 66.2 hours, (Note: Lightcurve plot for (1536) Pielinen by Petr Pravec of the Ondrejov Asteroid Photometry Project source data)) which is significantly longer than for most minor planets, that spin every 2 to 20 hours around their axis. However, slow rotators have periods typically above 100 hours. Photometric observations were taken by Petr Pravec (66.22 hours, Δ0.85 mag, U=3), Robert D. Stephens (66.34 hours, Δ0.80 mag, U=3-), Giovanni Casalnuovo (66.1 hours, Δ0.75 mag, U=2+), and Silvano Casulli (67.43 hours, Δ0.81 mag, U=2).

== Diameter and albedo ==
According to the space-based survey carried out by NASA's Wide-field Infrared Survey Explorer with its subsequent NEOWISE mission, Pielinen measures between 7.38 and 7.975 kilometers in diameter and its surface has an albedo between 0.253 and 0.30. The Collaborative Asteroid Lightcurve Link assumes an albedo of 0.24 – derived from 8 Flora, the largest member and namesake of this family – and calculates a diameter of 7.82 kilometers, with an absolute magnitude of 12.7.

== Naming ==
This minor planet is named after Pielinen, Finland's fourth largest lake in Finnish Karelia. The Koli National Park is located on its western shores. The official naming citation was published by the Minor Planet Center on 20 February 1976 (M.P.C. 3930).
