= North Karelia (disambiguation) =

North Karelia is a region in Finland

North Karelia may also refer to:

- North Karelia (parliamentary electoral district)
- North Karelia Province
- Northern Karelian dialect
- "Pohjois-Karjala" (song), translates to "North Karelia"

== See also ==
- Karelia (disambiguation)
