= Nunnanlahden Uuni =

Finnish manufacturer of stone products

Nunnanlahden Uuni Ltd.
- Native name: Nunnanlahden Uuni Oy
- Type: Limited company (osakeyhtiö)
- Industry: Manufacturing of stone products
- Founded: 1982; 44 years ago in Nunnanlahti, Finland
- Headquarters: Juuka, Finland
- Key people: Juhani Lehikoinen (Founder and Chairman of the Board); Johannes Uusitalo (CEO)
- Products: Fireplaces with baking ovens, baking ovens
- Revenue: € 5.1 million (2021)
- Number of employees: Approximately 50 (2022)
- Subsidiaries: Nunnauuni Oy

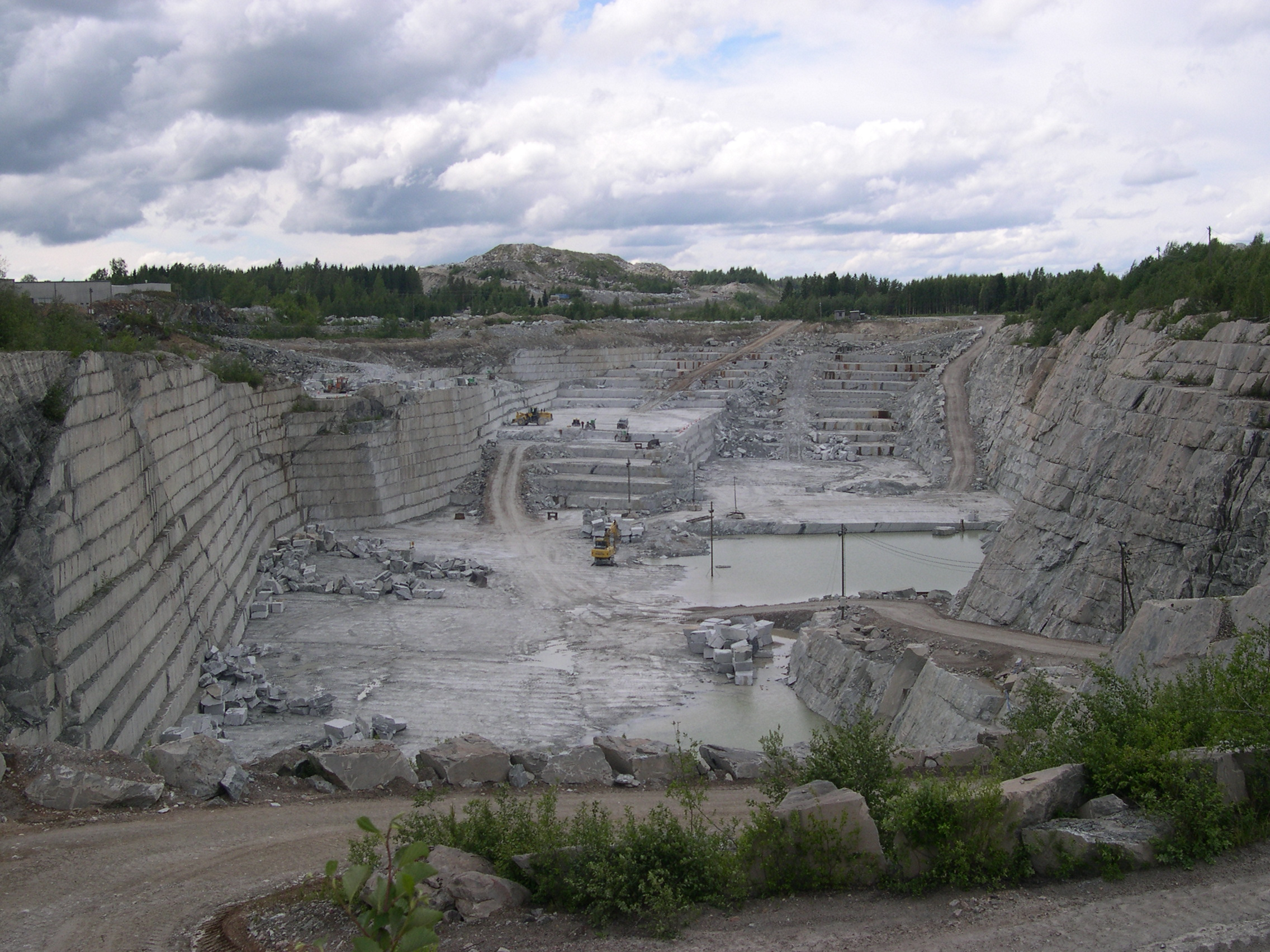
Mine in Finland

Nunnanlahden Uuni Ltd. (natively Nunnanlahden Uuni Oy) is a Finnish manufacturer of fireplaces and ovens. It was founded in 1982. The company established the subsidiary Nunnauuni Oy in 2007 to be responsible for the production, marketing, and sales of fireplaces. The company has an exclusive right to use the Mammutti soapstone, which research has shown to be highly suited for the high temperatures of the fire chamber. It utilizes also more than 100 years of fireplace expertise in the region. These have enabled the development of the Golden Fire clean gasification burning method. The headquarters, production facilities, and mine of the companies are located in Nunnanlahti in the municipality of Juuka. In addition to Finland, the main market areas are Central Europe and the Baltic States, where Nunnauuni fireplaces are sold by authorized dealers.
