= Karelia (disambiguation) =

Karelia is an area in Northern Europe divided between Russia and Finland.

Karelia may also refer to:

== Present-day regions ==
- Republic of Karelia, a subject within the Russian Federation
  - Karelia constituency, Russian legislative constituency in the Republic of Karelia
- Finnish Karelia
  - North Karelia, an administrative region in Finland
  - South Karelia, an administrative region in Finland

== History and politics ==
- Karelia (historical province), a historical province of Finland and Sweden
- Karelia County, the name of the Viborg and Nyslott County in 1634–1641
- One of the historical semi-independent states:
  - Provisional Government of Karelia (1919–1920)
  - Olonets Government of Southern Karelia (1920)
  - Karelian United Government (1920–1923)
- Karelian Autonomous Soviet Socialist Republic, a Soviet republic that existed from 1923 to 1940 and from 1956 to 1991
- Karelo-Finnish Soviet Socialist Republic, a republic of the USSR (1940–1956)
- Northern Karelia Province, a province of Finland (1960–1997)

== Music ==
- Karelia (album), 1989 album by Shizuka Kudo
- Karelia Suite, a collection of classical music by Jean Sibelius
- The Karelia (band), a former band of Alex Kapranos
- Karelia (heavy metal band), a French heavy metal band
- "Karelia", a song by Lidia Klement
- "Karelia", an instrumental piece by Amorphis on their 1992 album The Karelian Isthmus
- "Karelia", an instrumental piece by Anekdoten on their 1993 album Vemod
- "Karelia", an instrumental piece by Insomnium on their 2019 album Heart Like a Grave

== Business ==
- Karelia Tobacco Company, a Greek tobacco company
- FC Karelia Petrozavodsk, formerly professional Russian football team
- FC Karelia-Discovery Petrozavodsk, amateur/semi-pro Russian football team
- Karelia University of Applied Sciences, Finnish University

== Other ==
- Russian submarine Karelia (K-18), a submarine in service with the Russian Navy
- Karelia Watson, software program released by Karelia Software for the Macintosh in 2001
- Karelian Province, geological province of the Baltic shield

== See also ==
- Karelian (disambiguation)
- North Karelia (disambiguation)
- Academic Karelia Society
- National Theatre of Karelia
