= Karelian =

Karelian refers to something from or related to the region of Karelia, in present-day Russia and Finland.

- Karelians, an ethnic group in Russia speaking the Karelian language
- Karelians (Finns), a subgroup of Finns
- Karelian language, a Baltic Finnic language
- South Karelian dialects, a group of Southeast Finnish dialects

== See also ==
- Karelia (disambiguation)
- Kurilian (disambiguation)
