= Pielisjärvi =

- Former municipality
- Coat of arms

- Coordinates: 63°18′N 30°03′E
- Country: Finland
- Province: Northern Karelia Province
- Region: North Karelia

Area
  - Total: 3,462 km^{2} (1,337 sq mi)

Population
  - Total: 16,150
  - Density: 4.665/km^{2} (12.08/sq mi)

Pielisjärvi is a former municipality in the region of North Karelia in Finland. The municipality had 16,150 inhabitants in 1970. Pielisjärvi was a Finnish-speaking municipality.

Pielisjärvi municipality was joined with the city of Lieksa in 1973.

== History ==
Pielisjärvi is named after the lake Pielinen, sometimes also called Pielisjärvi. The area of modern North Karelia was ceded by Russia to Sweden in 1617 in the Treaty of Stolbovo, becoming part of the Kexholm County in 1634. Pielisjärvi was first mentioned in 1618 as Pelis Järffwi Pogost. Pielisjärvi was originally a part of the Liperi parish, being separated in 1639. At the time, Pielisjärvi also included Juuka, Nurmes and Valtimo. Nurmes, including Valtimo and most of Rautavaara, was separated in 1810 while Juuka was separated in 1873. In 1936, Lieksa became a separate municipality. Pielisjärvi was eventually consolidated with Lieksa in 1973.
