= Kurilian =

Kurilian means 'of or having to do with the Kuril Islands'. It may specifically refer to:

- The geography or other features of the Kuril Islands (also called Kurile, Kurilsky, Kurilskiye, or Chishima Islands)
- Peoples of the Kuril Islands:
  - Ainu people (original inhabitants)
  - Japanese people (settlers from 1869 to 1946)
  - Russian people (settlers from 1943 to present)
- Kurilian dispute or Kuril Islands dispute – conflict between Russia and Japan over the southern Kuril Islands
- Kurilian Bobtail, a breed of domestic cat

== See also ==
- Karelian (disambiguation)
