= Sakari Timonen =

Finnish blogger and politician

Sakari "Saku" Timonen (born 18 December 1957 in Juuka, Finland) is a Finnish blogger, known for his "Uuninpankkopoika" blog. In April 2017 Timonen moved from Image magazine to Apu magazine as a blogger.

== Biography ==
Timonen was born in Juuka, Northern Karelia. He has one brother and one sister. His father was a taxi driver and his mother was an accountant. After primary school, secondary school and the army, Timonen studied social sciences at the University of Tampere. In connection with his studies, he worked in summertime at child care in Vantaa. After his studies, he worked as an economic secretary in Maaninka as an economic secretary. After this he moved to the Helsinki capital region working as a youth counsellor and social inspector in the social bureau of the city of Vantaa.

After studying jurisprudence at the University of Helsinki and graduating as a Bachelor of Law, Timonen worked as senior inspector at the Bureau of Road and Waterworks Construction from 1989 to 1990 and as deputy city secretary of the city of Helsinki from 1990 to 1997. After this, he worked as an office manager of the construction board of the city of Helsinki from 1998 to 1999.

In 2000 Timonen returned to his homeland in Juuka to live in his parents' home. His father died of complications from bypass surgery in 2006, and he has lived together with his mother since then. During his life in Juuka, Timonen has sporadically worked as a lawyer in connection with his blogging.

== Politics ==
Timonen was elected as a member of the municipal council of Juuka as a member of the Social Democratic Party of Finland in 2012.

== Blog ==
In his blog Timonen deals with problems in Finnish society, such as poverty and matters related to the work life, as well as questions relating to immigration and racism. He has been especially interested in matters relating to employment and has been a special critic of rehabilitative work activity and has written about various forms and problems relating to unpaid work.

Timonen started his blog in 2010 and has used it to correct false information about alleged social benefits given to immigrants. In his blog, Timonen has also written about false news websites such as MV-lehti and Magneettimedia, correcting false information published on the websites. Since May 2016 Timonen's blog posts have also been translated to Swedish.

According to Timonen, his blog has a "basic negative point of view", as he only writes about things that are not in order in Finland. Usually Timonen writes about things he can connect with jurisprudence. He has often been asked to participate in current affairs programs and panel discussions on television, but he does not view himself as a public presenter, but instead wishes to remain talking through his text.

=== Criticism ===
The MOT program of YLE does not accept Timonen's claim that "The journalists do what they are told to do. They are told to keep silent of some things, but to write actively about some things even if it requires bending facts".

== Harassment ==
Timonen has been a victim of harassment several times. In 2013 he wrote in his blog to correct false information about social benefits for immigrants, for example by stating that the minimum support grants and unemployment grants given to immigrants were no larger than those given to ethnic Finns. Timonen's blog post was met with hate mail including threats of physical violence.

In June 2015 Timonen wrote about Finns Party parliament member Olli Immonen's connections to the Neo-Nazi organisation Finnish Resistance Movement, after which a denial-of-service attack as made to his blog service. After this the blog moved to Image magazine in August. In March 2016 a Finns Party council member of Salo who had been harassing and insulting Timonen for a long time was dismissed from his post as a lay judge, when the district court of Finland Proper saw that his Internet writing was in conflict with the behaviour expected of a judge. In June 2016 a dead rat was mailed to Timonen's 81-year-old mother. As well as Timonen, another blogger who had been writing about immigration critics and his three-year-old son had received threats.

== Awards ==
On Independence Day 2015 Timonen received an award from the Committee of 100 from his work in dealing with problems in Finnish society.
