= Koli, Finland =

Hill in Finland

Koli
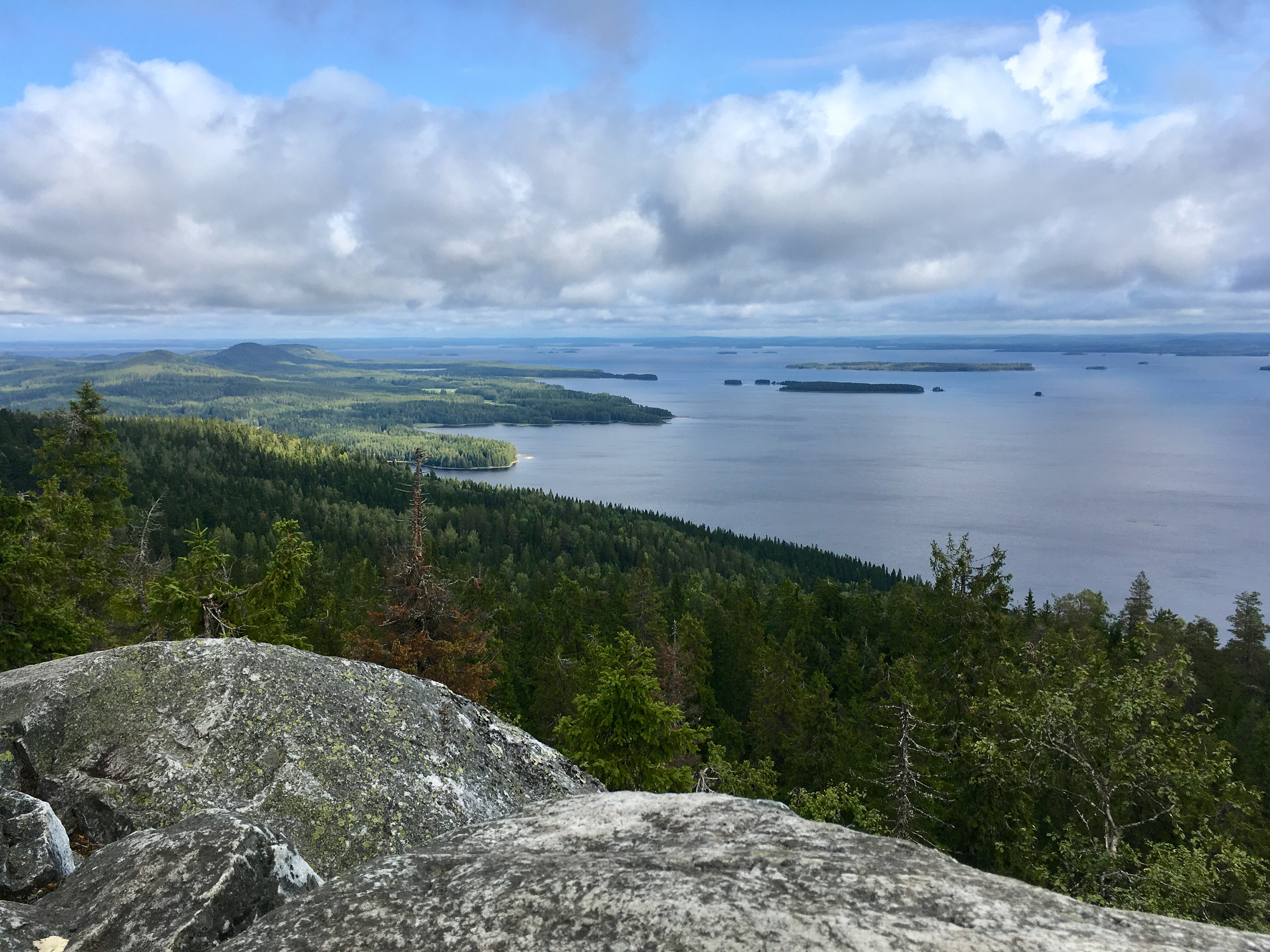
- A view from the summit of Ukko-Koli

Highest point
- Elevation: 354 m (1,161 ft)
- Prominence: 253 m (830 ft)
- Coordinates: 63°05′40″N 29°48′31″E

Geography
- Location within Finland
- Location: Lieksa, Finland

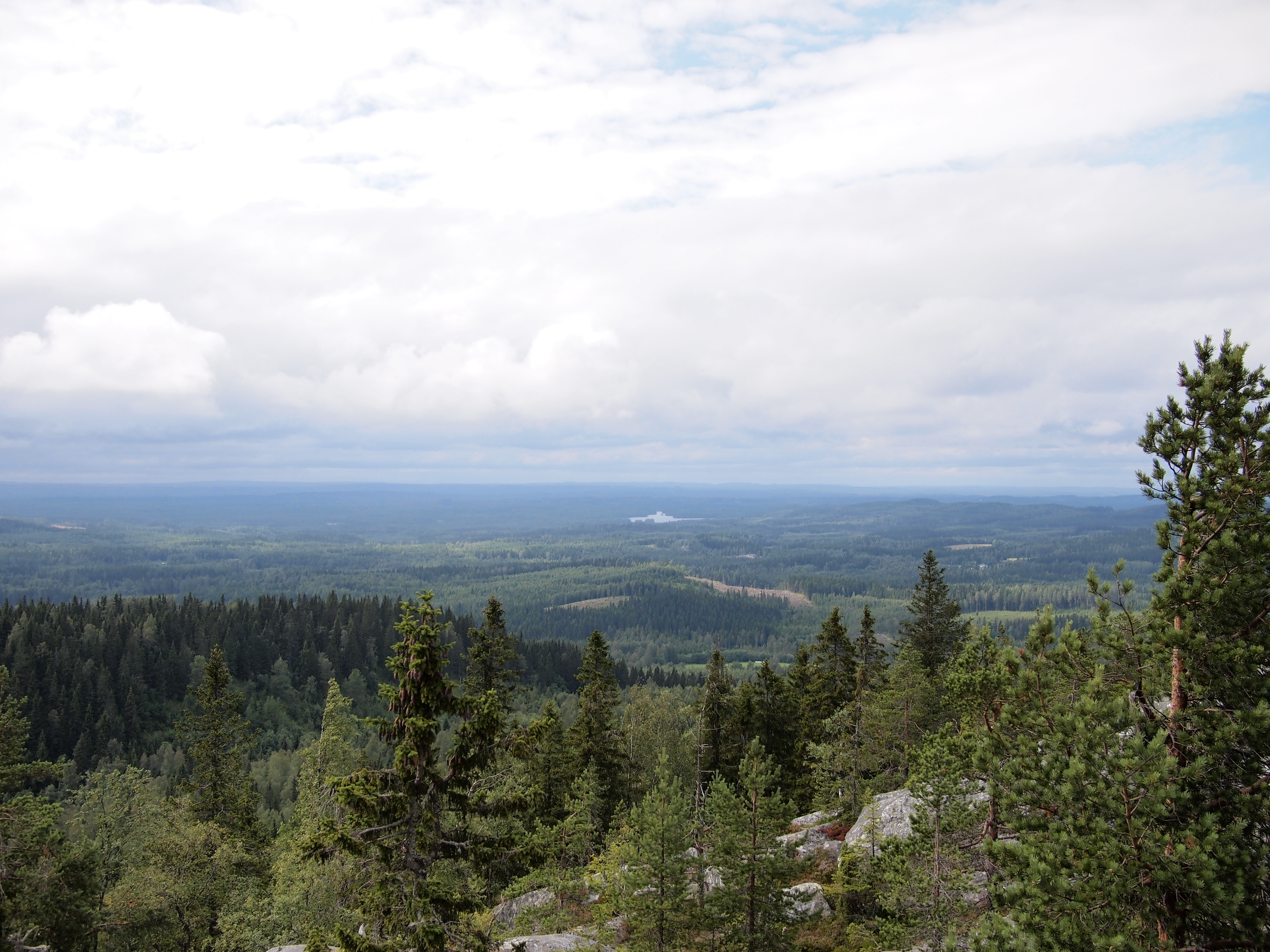
A look from Akka-Koli towards west

Koli is a hill by the lake Pielinen in municipality of Lieksa in eastern Finland. It mainly consists of white quartzite, and its summit has large treeless areas. Koli village is at the root of the hill, and the area is part of Koli National Park.

== Description ==
Predecessor of the Koli fells, the Karelian fold mountains, or Karelides were formed in a crash of tectonic plates about 1800 million years ago, an old plate sunk down towards the core of the Earth and a younger plate pushed upwards. From the younger plate arose the five-kilometre-high peaked mountains known as Karelides. Over the millions of years, however, the high mountains eroded and only Koli remains.

Koli's cliffs have received their characteristic smooth, rounded shape during the ice age. The continental ice has also collected moraines to eskers, moved huge boulders and created boulder caves and rocks with ripple marks in the area.

The summits are called Ukko-Koli (347 m), Akka-Koli (339 m), Paha-Koli (334 m) and Pieni-Koli (238 m). (Names refer to the God of Sky, Ukko, the Female Spirit Akka, the Evil Spirit and the Little hill, respectively)

Koli has inspired many painters and composers, notably Jean Sibelius, Juhani Aho and Eero Järnefelt. Eero Järnefelt painted a large scene together with Alfred William Finch and Ilmari Aalto in 1911, which can be seen in the Helsinki railway station restaurant. Painters discovered Koli in the 19th century and it has been called one of the national sceneries of Finland.

Climate data for Lieksa Koli (1991-2020 normals)
Month	Jan	Feb	Mar	Apr	May	Jun	Jul	Aug	Sep	Oct	Nov	Dec	Year
Average precipitation mm (inches)	55 (2.2)	46 (1.8)	43 (1.7)	37 (1.5)	55 (2.2)	75 (3.0)	93 (3.7)	83 (3.3)	76 (3.0)	76 (3.0)	67 (2.6)	66 (2.6)	772 (30.4)
Average precipitation days (≥ 0.1 mm)	23	19	16	13	13	15	15	16	17	20	23	24	214
Source: https://www.ilmatieteenlaitos.fi/1991-2020-sadetilastot
