= National Theatre of Karelia =

Theatre in Petrozavdosk, Russia

- Karjalan kansallinen teatteri
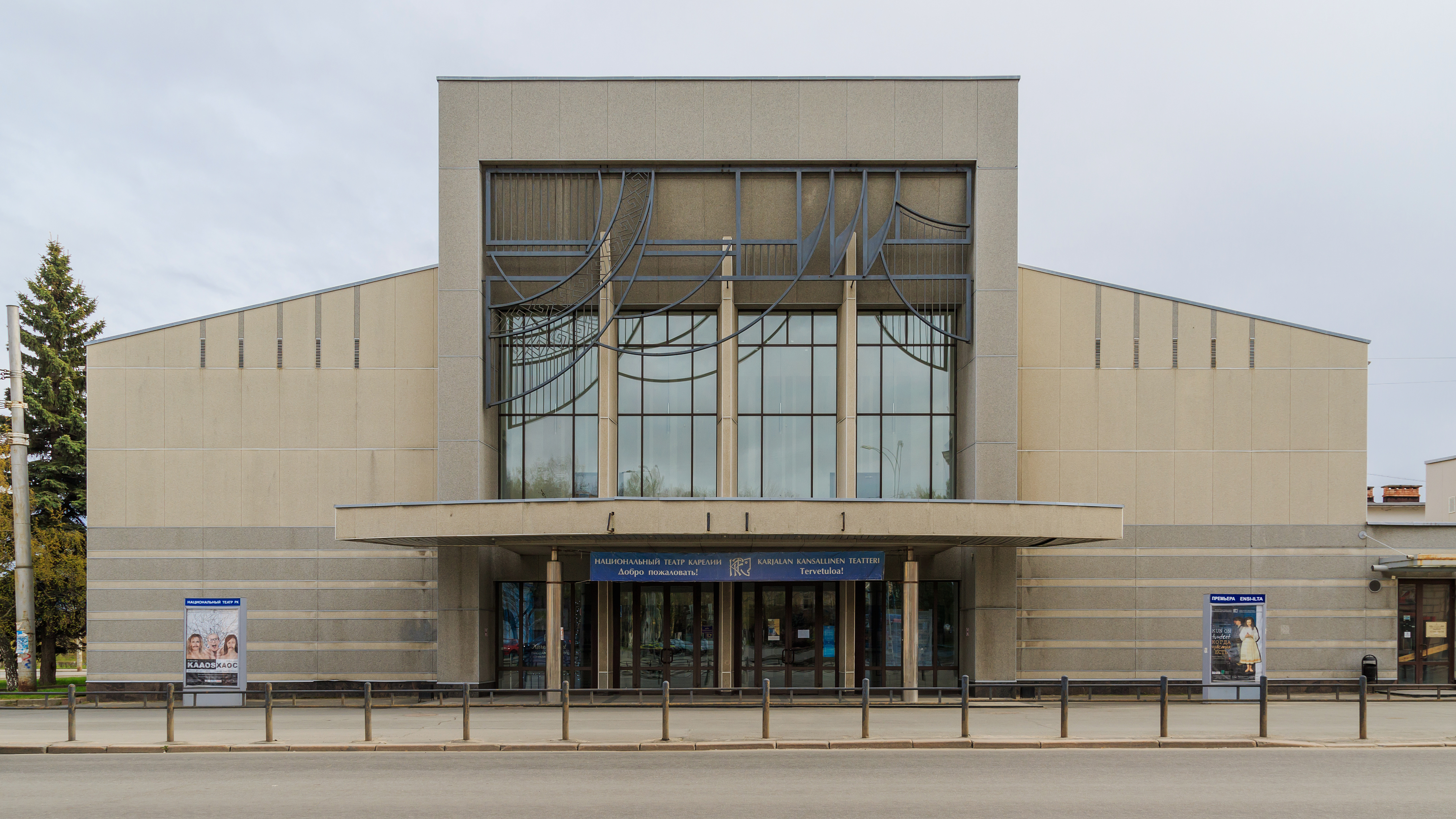
- Interactive map of National Theatre of Karelia
- Address: Karl Marx prospect 19; Petrozavodsk; Russia
- Coordinates: 61°47′14″N 34°22′47″E
- Type: Theatre

Construction
- Opened: 1911
- Renovated: 1965

Website
- n-teatr.ru

National Theatre of Karelia (Finnish: Karjalan kansallinen teatteri, Russian: Национа́льный теа́тр Республики Каре́лия) is a 1932 established theatre in Petrozavodsk, Republic of Karelia, Russia. It is the only Finnish language theatre in Russia. The theater is also the main platform for plays in Karelian and Vepsian on Russia.
