= Ilmari Aalto =

Finnish painter

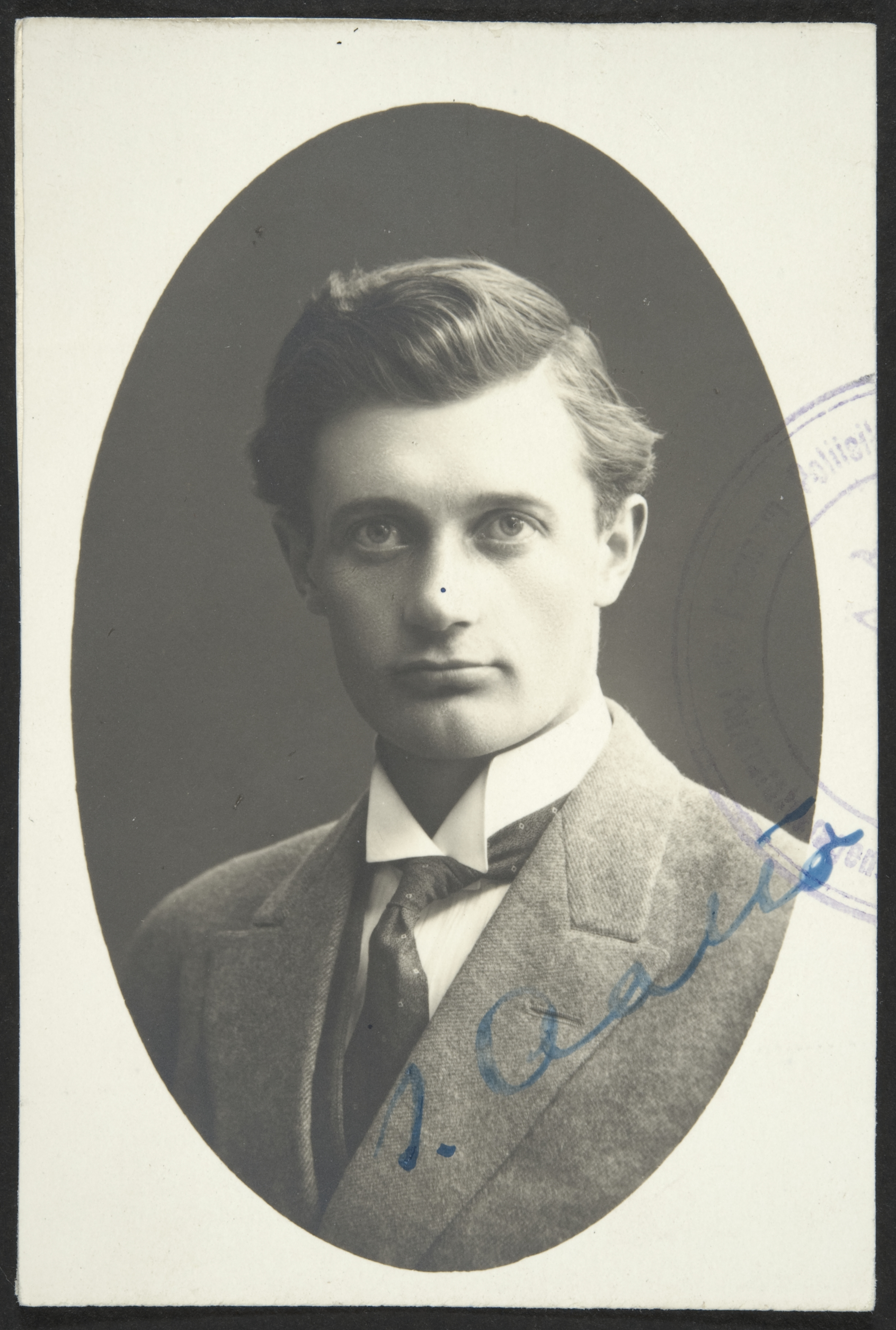
- Aalto in likely the 1920s
- Born: 7 August 1891; Kuopio
- Died: 29 September 1934 (aged 43)
- Education: Central School of Arts and Crafts, Finnish Art Society

Ilmari Aalto (7 August 1891 – 29 September 1934) was a Finnish painter. He was a member of the expressionist November Group led by the artist Tyko Sallinen. Aalto painted still lives, landscapes and portraits.

== Life ==
Aalto was born in Kuopio. He studied at the Central School of Arts and Crafts from 1907 to 1908 and the Finnish Art Society drawing school from 1908 to 1910.

== Career ==
Most of Aalto's landscape paintings are of Töölö and Suursaari. Aalto together with Alfred William Finch aided Eero Järnefelt paint the large landscape Koli at the Helsinki Central Station in 1911. Järnefelt and Finch were more involved in the design, but of the three artists only Aalto dared to climb the tall ladder.

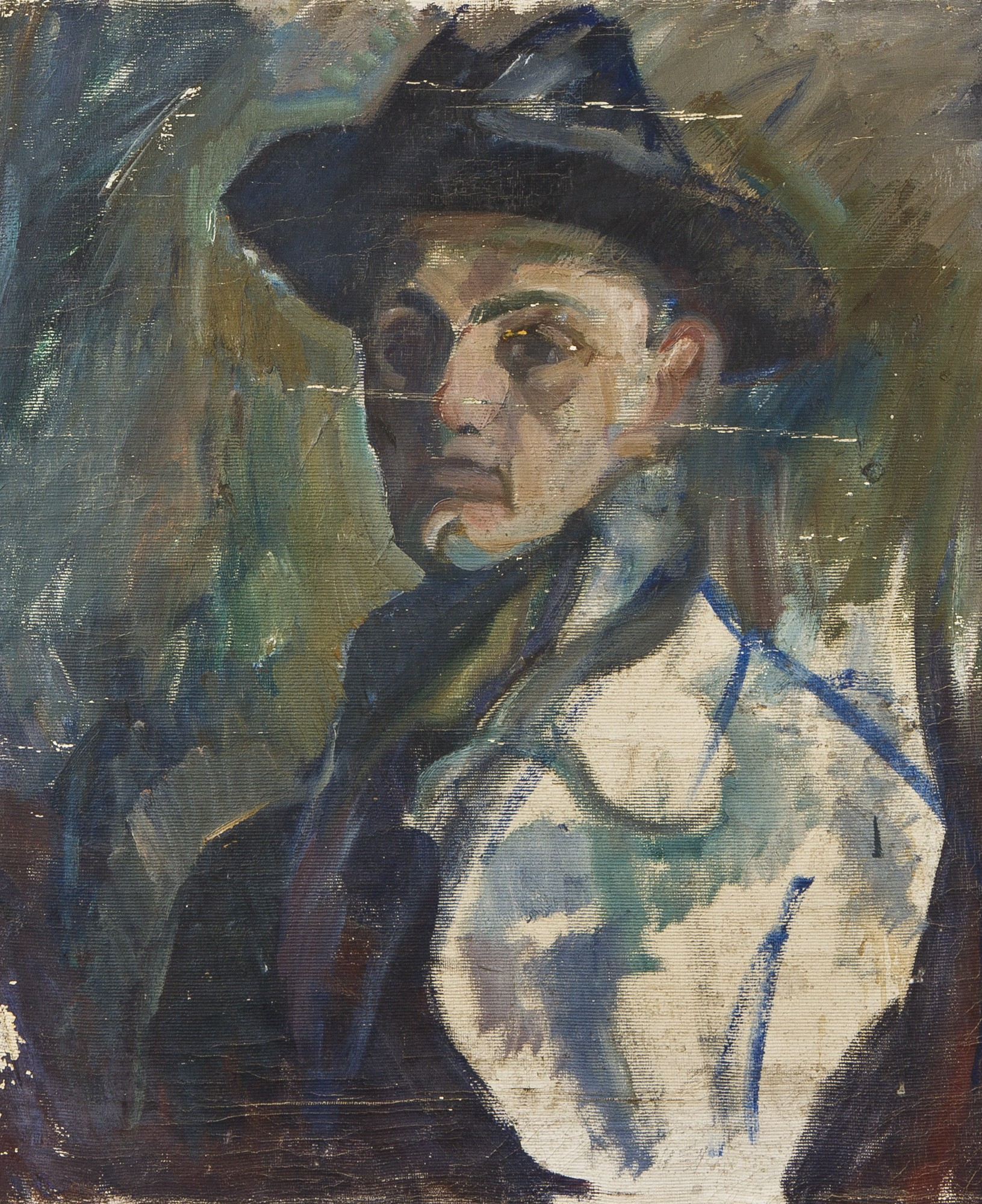
Self-Portrait

Having begun with expressionism he also got familiar with cubism in 1914. Seeing an Edvard Munch exhibition at the Ateneum soon after his graduation had a strong influence on him and built on the expressionist influences. The first exhibition by cubists and expressionists was held in Finland in 1914, featuring key artists such as from the group Der Blaue Reiter.

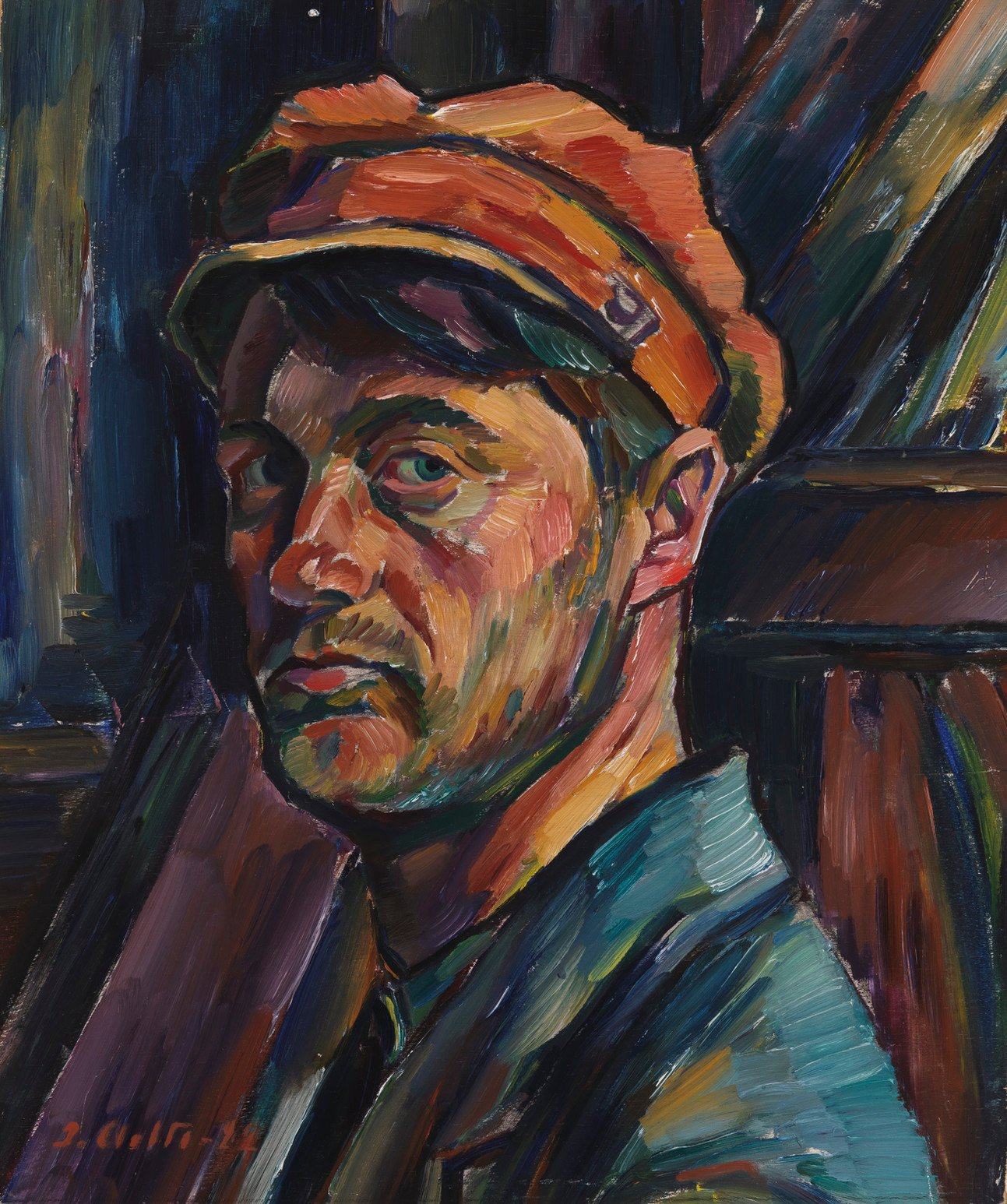
Self-Portrait, 1922

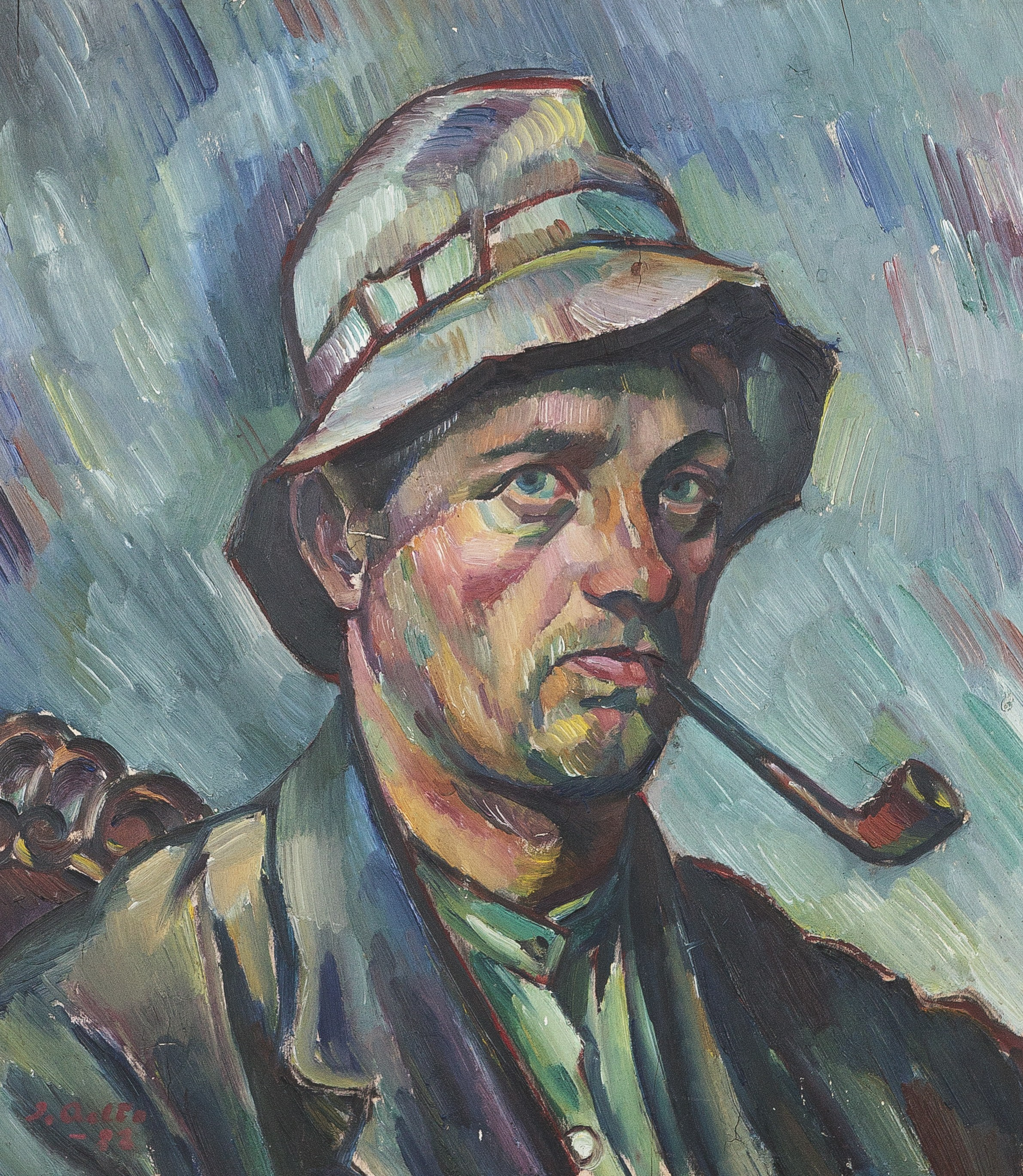
Self-Portrait

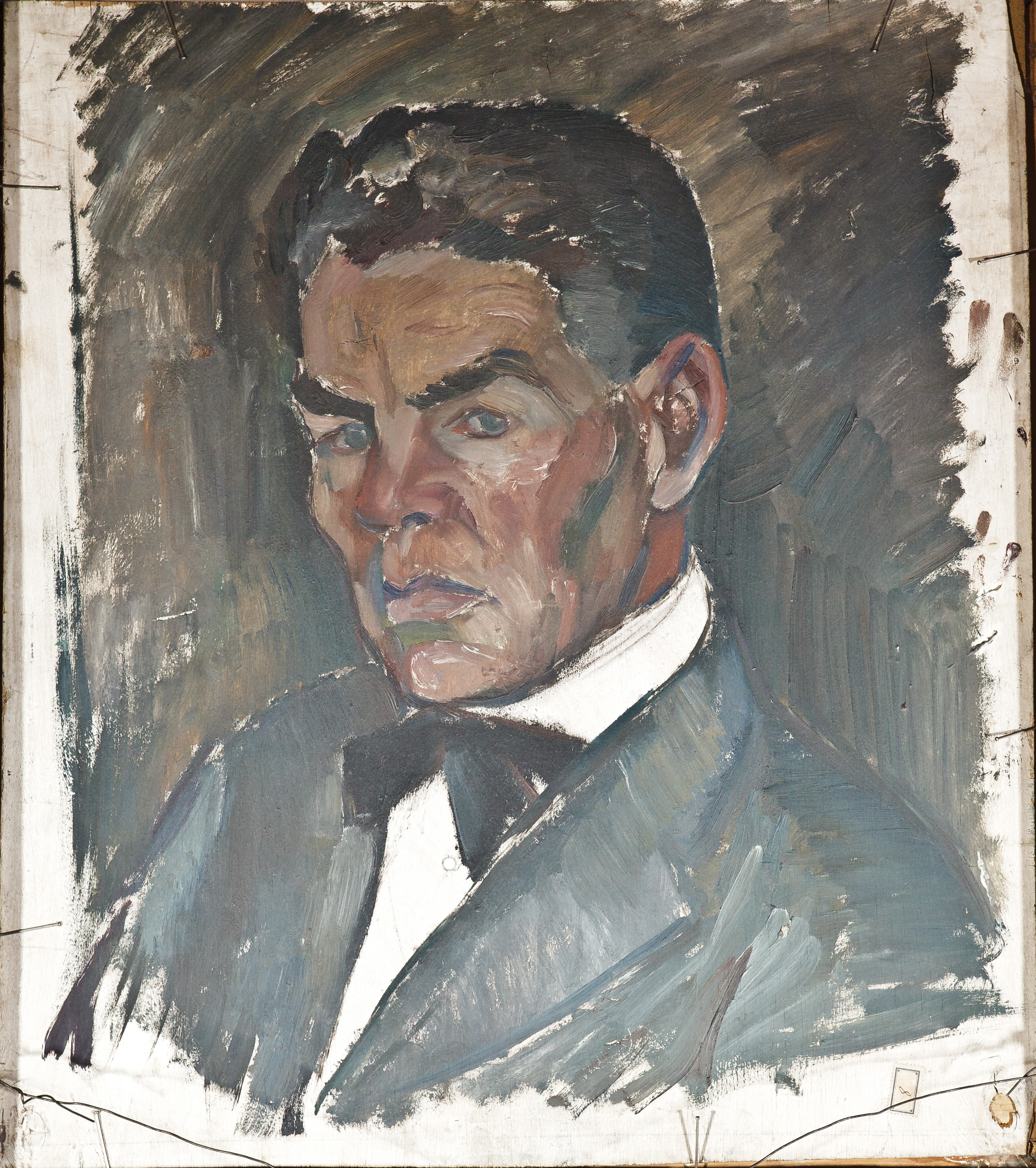
Another self-portrait on the back of the earlier work

After the 1920 trip to Paris, Aalto began to use more colors and strong brush strokes instead of the previously greyish palette. Later, while visiting Paris in 1928 he adopted a more realistic expression, clear contours and unmixed colors. Strongly self-critical, he is said to have destroyed many of his works.

Aalto died of liver cancer at the age of 43. Aalto's spouse was Alli Helena Linnalahti (formerly Ketonen).

== Gallery ==
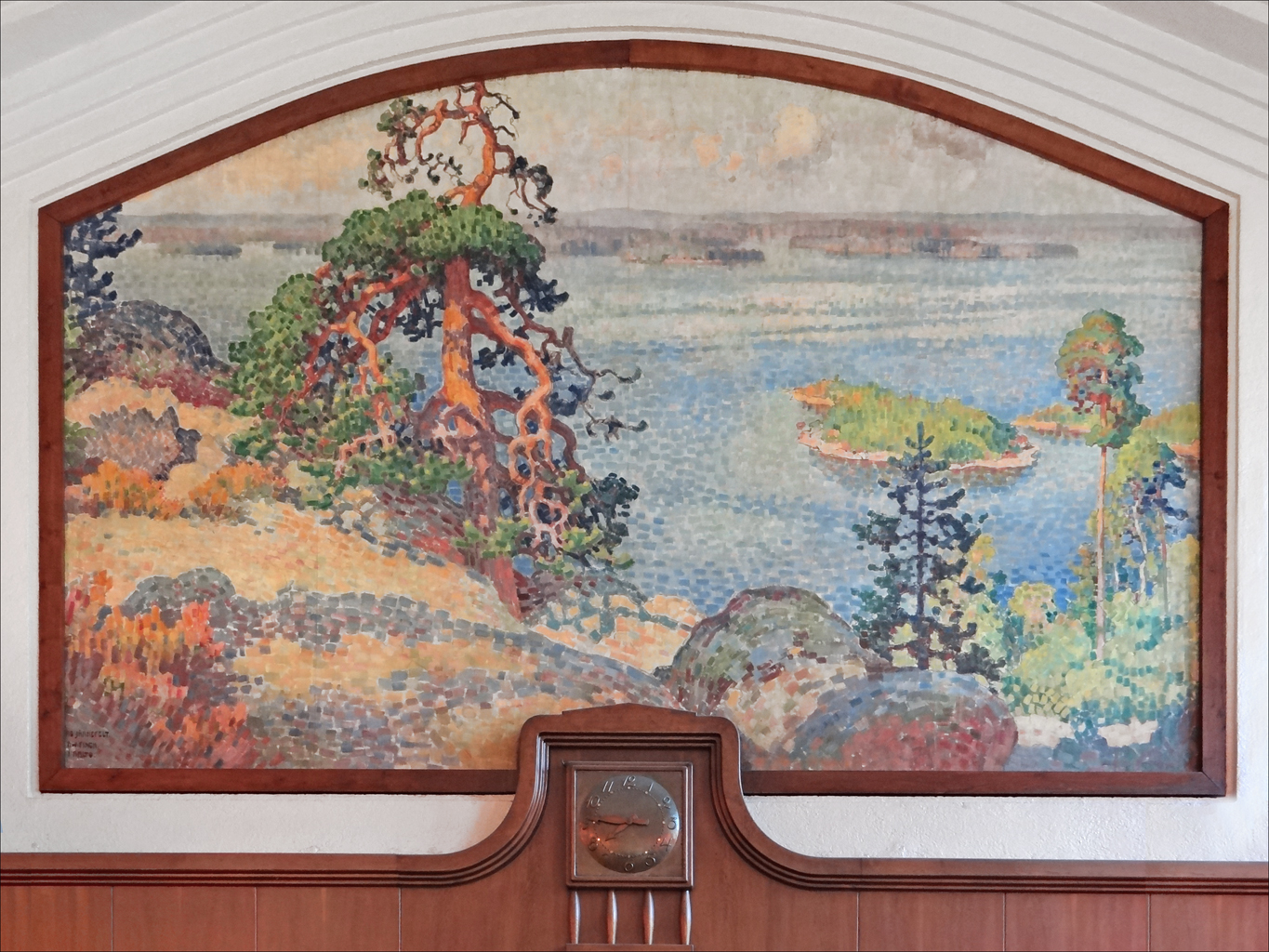
Koli at Helsinki Central Station by Eero Järnefelt with help from Alfred William Finch and Ilmari Aalto, 1911

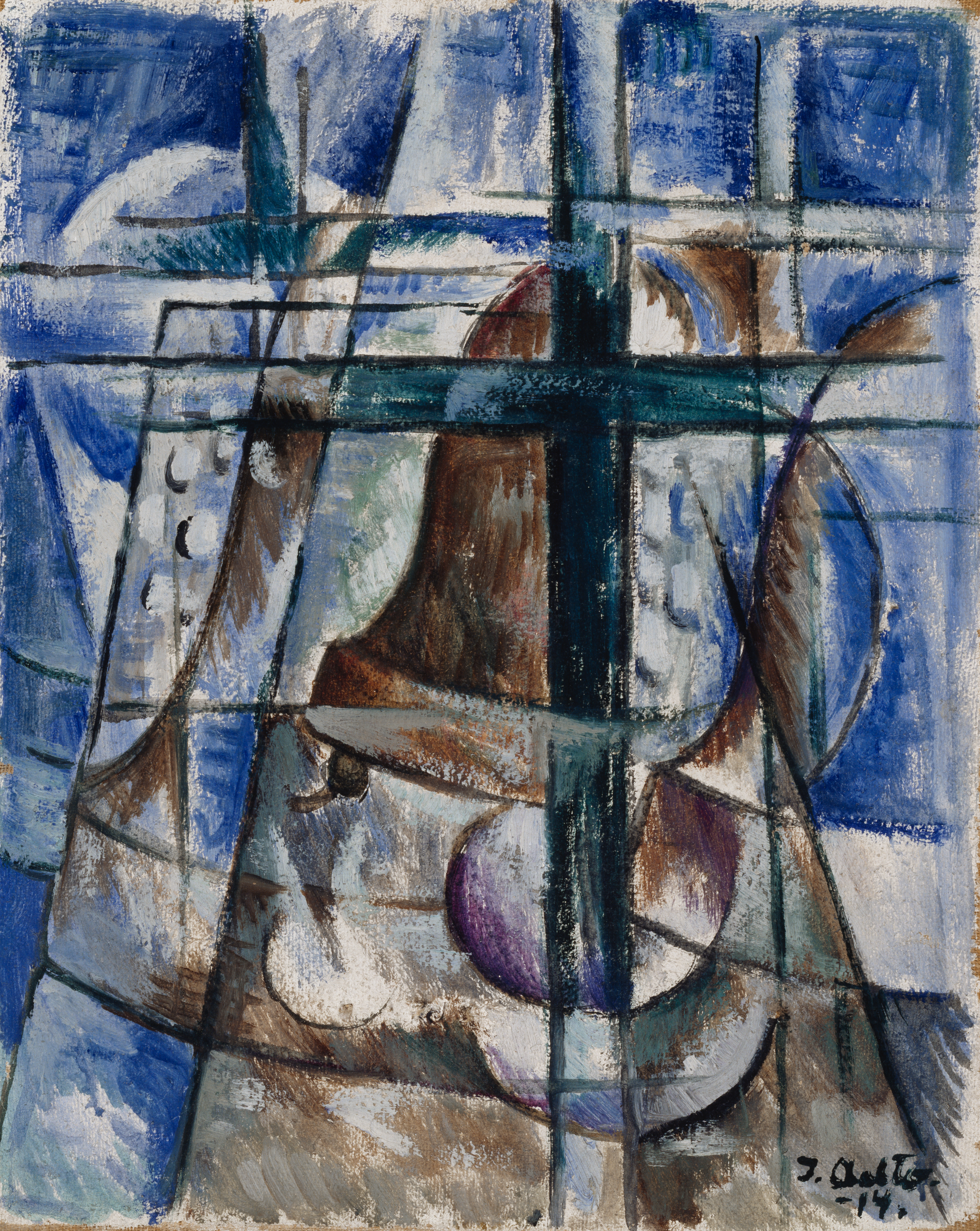
The Bells, 1914

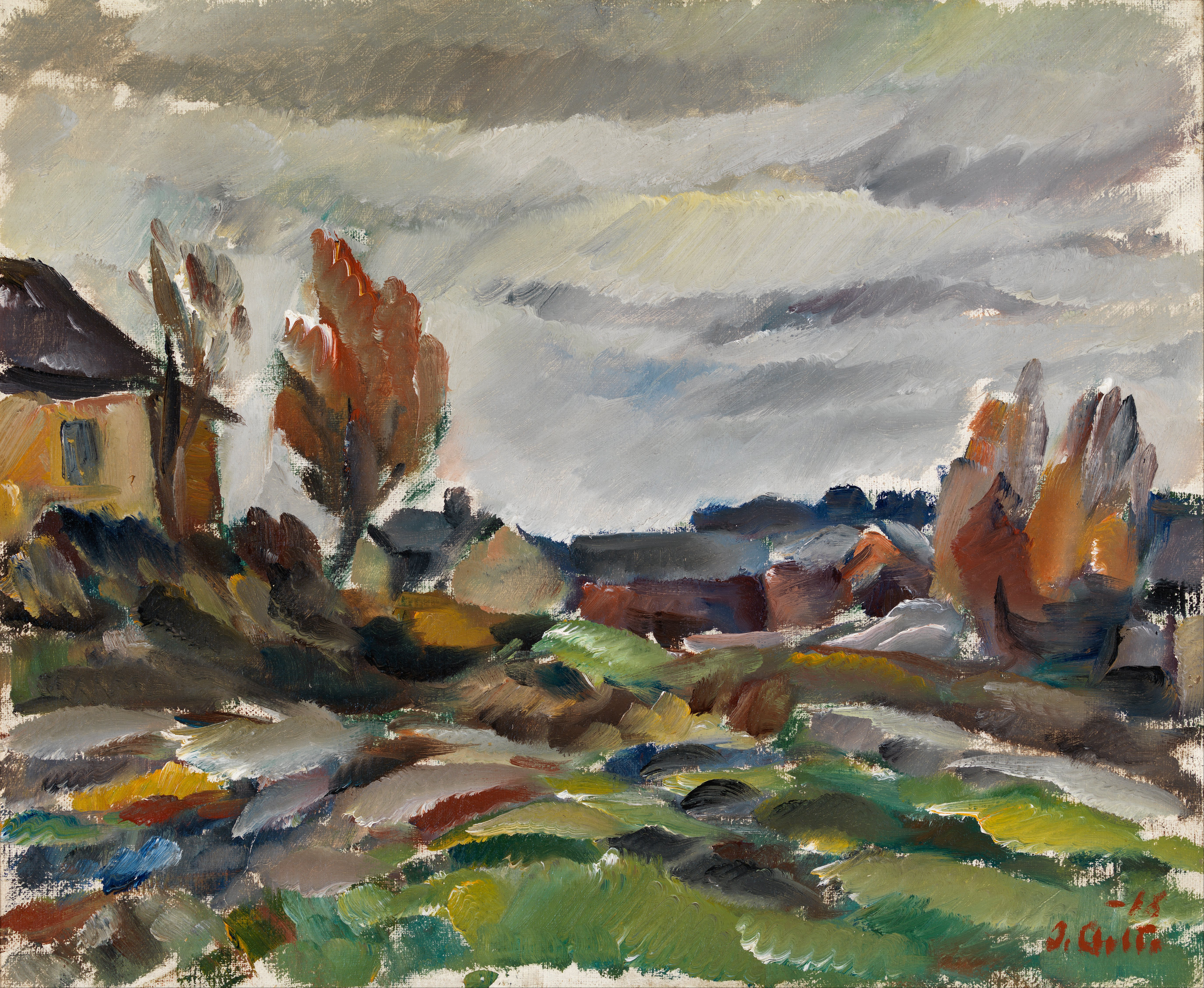
Storm, 1915

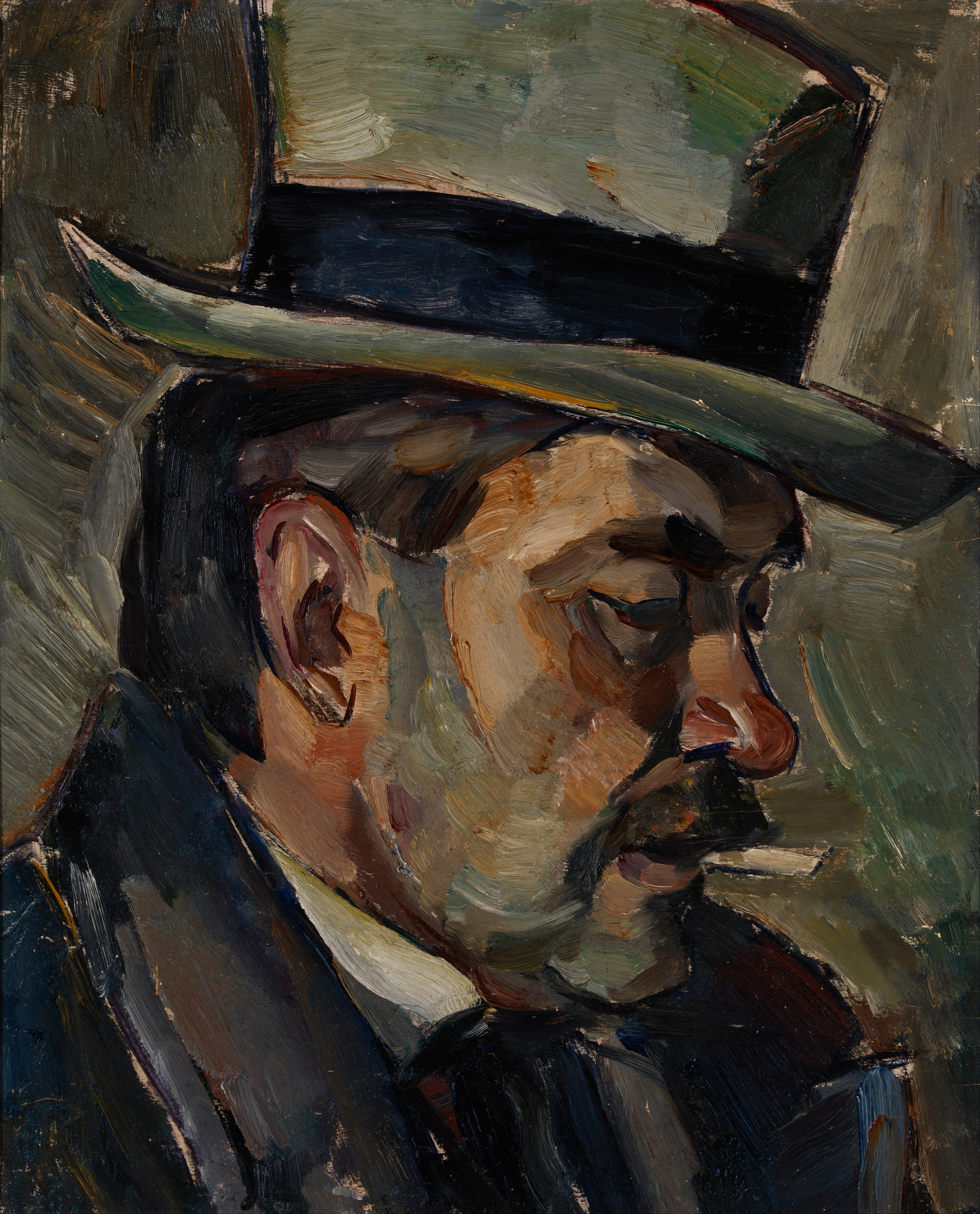
Portrait of Artist Karnakoski, 1917

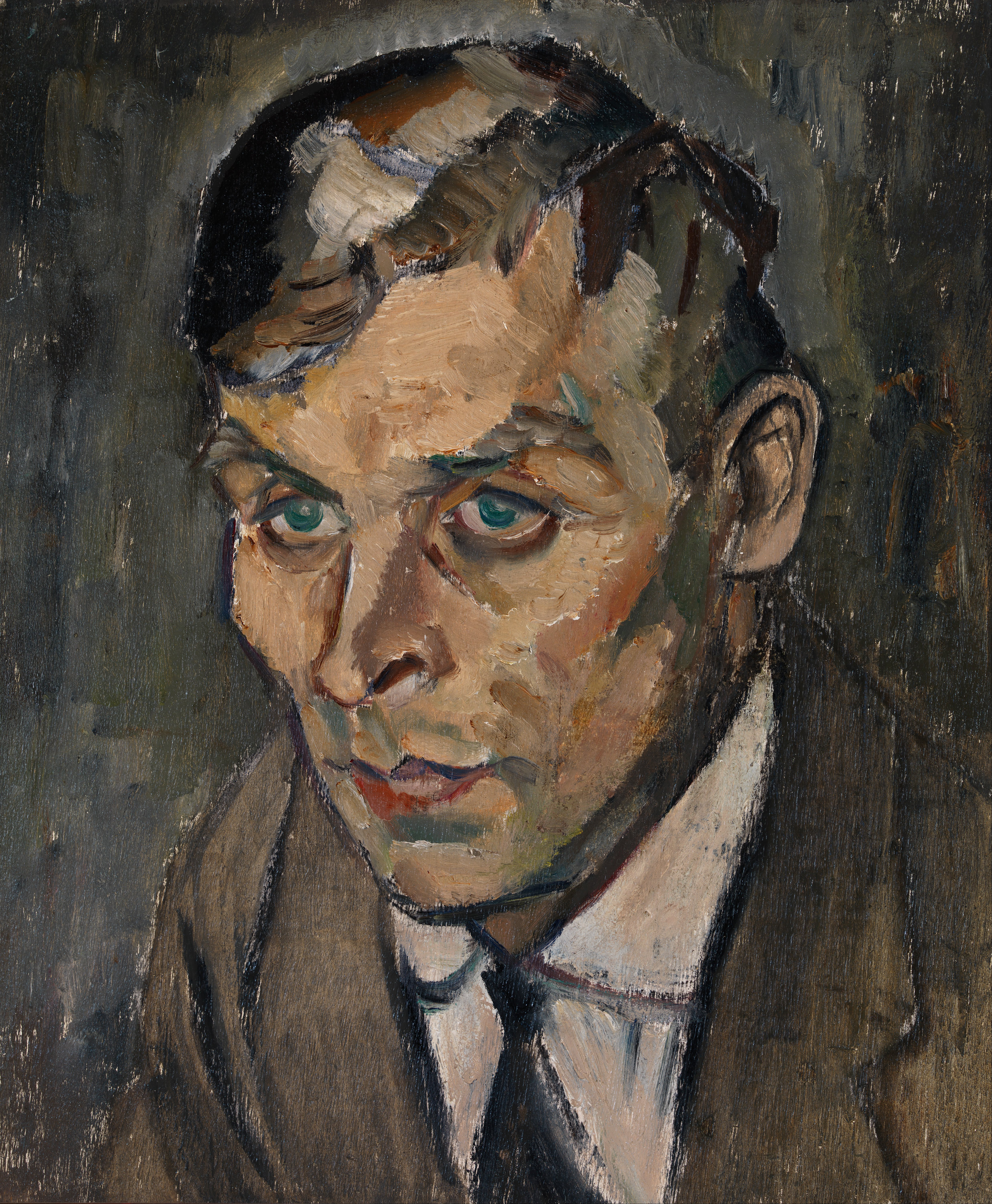
Portrait of Artist Väinö Kamppuri, 1917

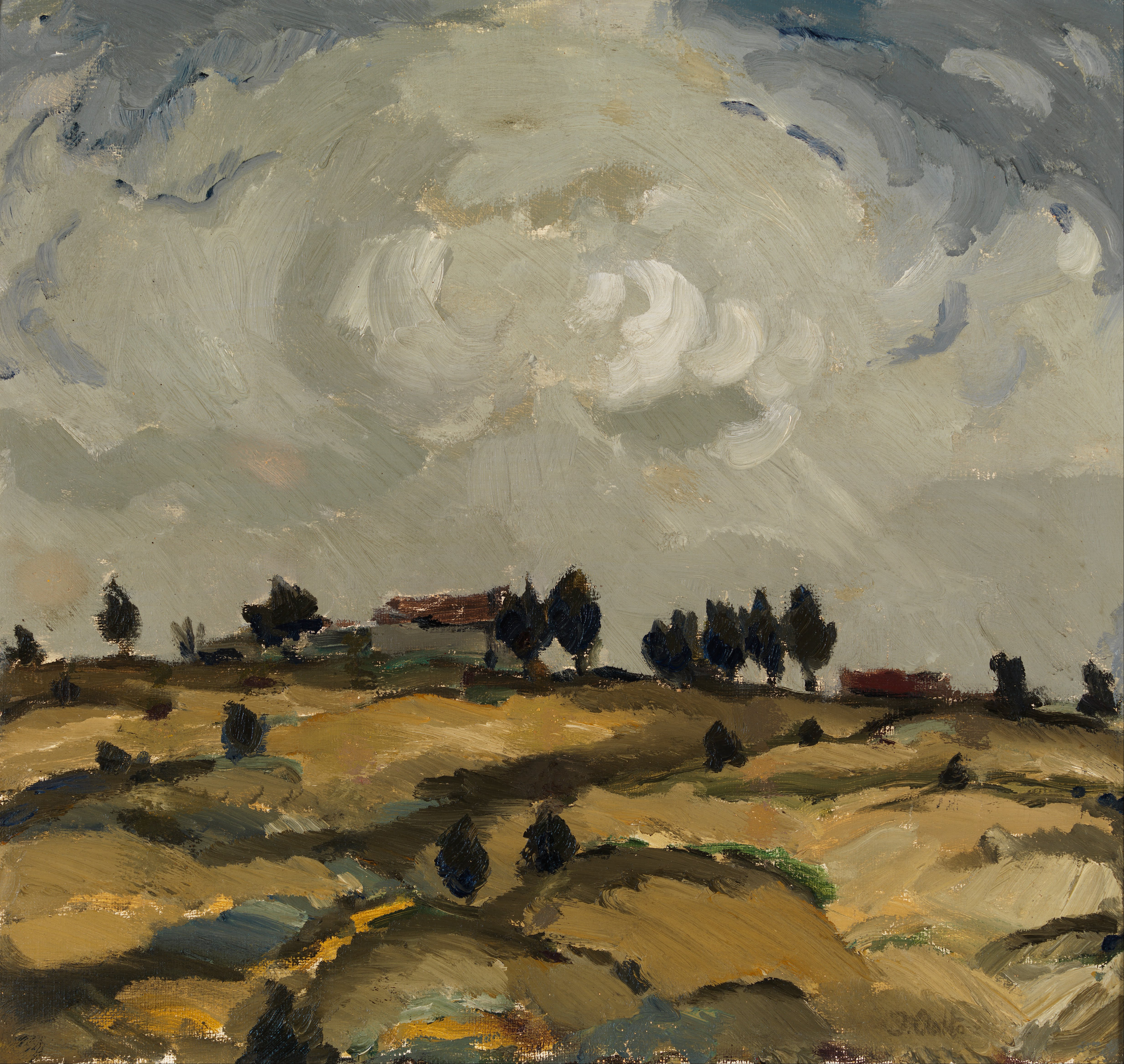
Autumn Landscape with Clouds, 1917
