= Koli National Park =

National park in North Karelia region, Finland

- IUCN category II (national park)
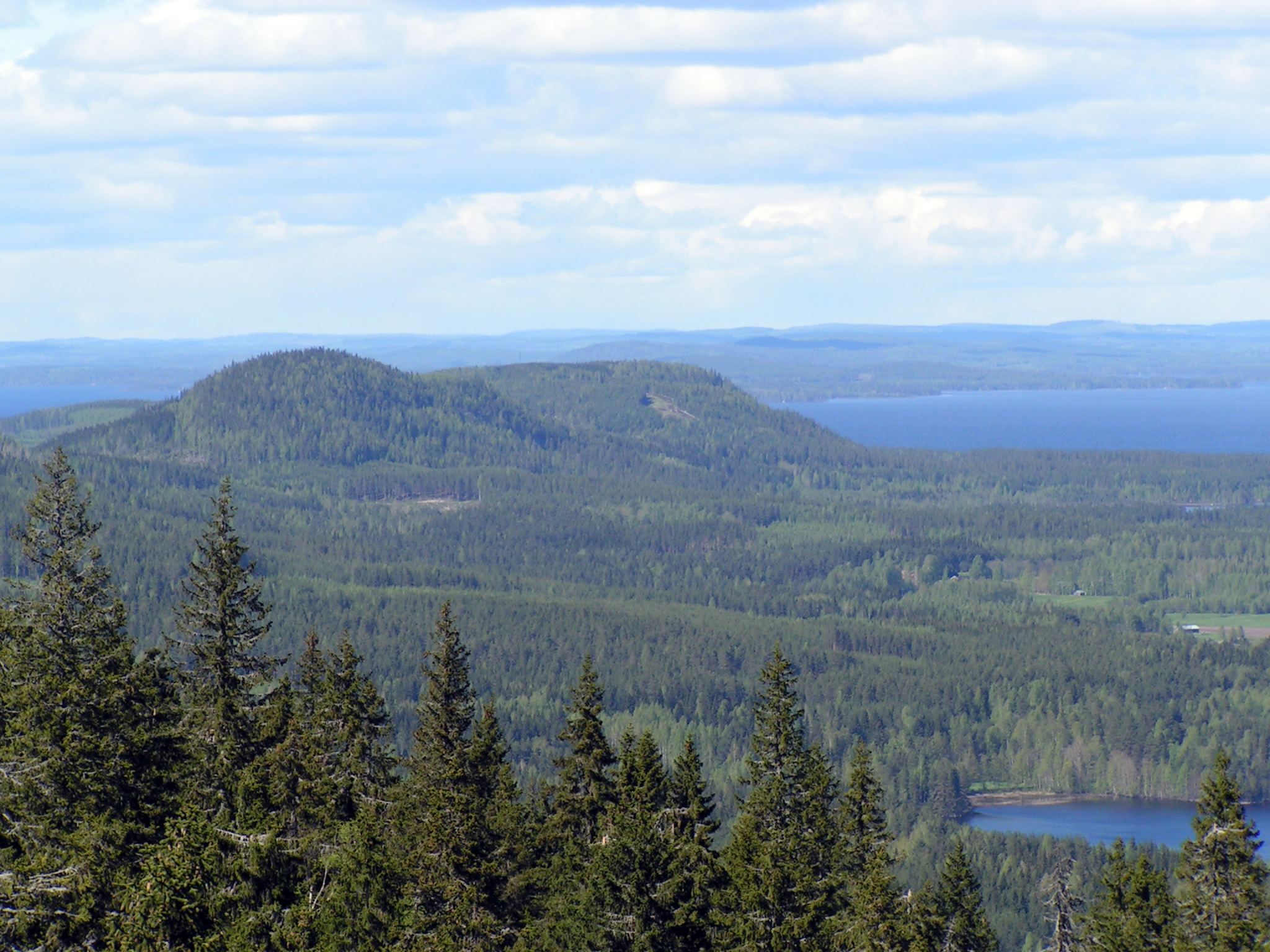
- An elevated view at Koli

- Location within Finland
- Location: North Karelia, Finland
- Coordinates: 63°03′27″N 29°53′14″E
- Area: 30 km^{2} (12 sq mi)
- Established: 1991
- Visitors: 249,800 (in 2024)
- Governing body: Metsähallitus
- Website: www.koli.fi/en/ www.luontoon.fi/en/destinations/koli-national-park

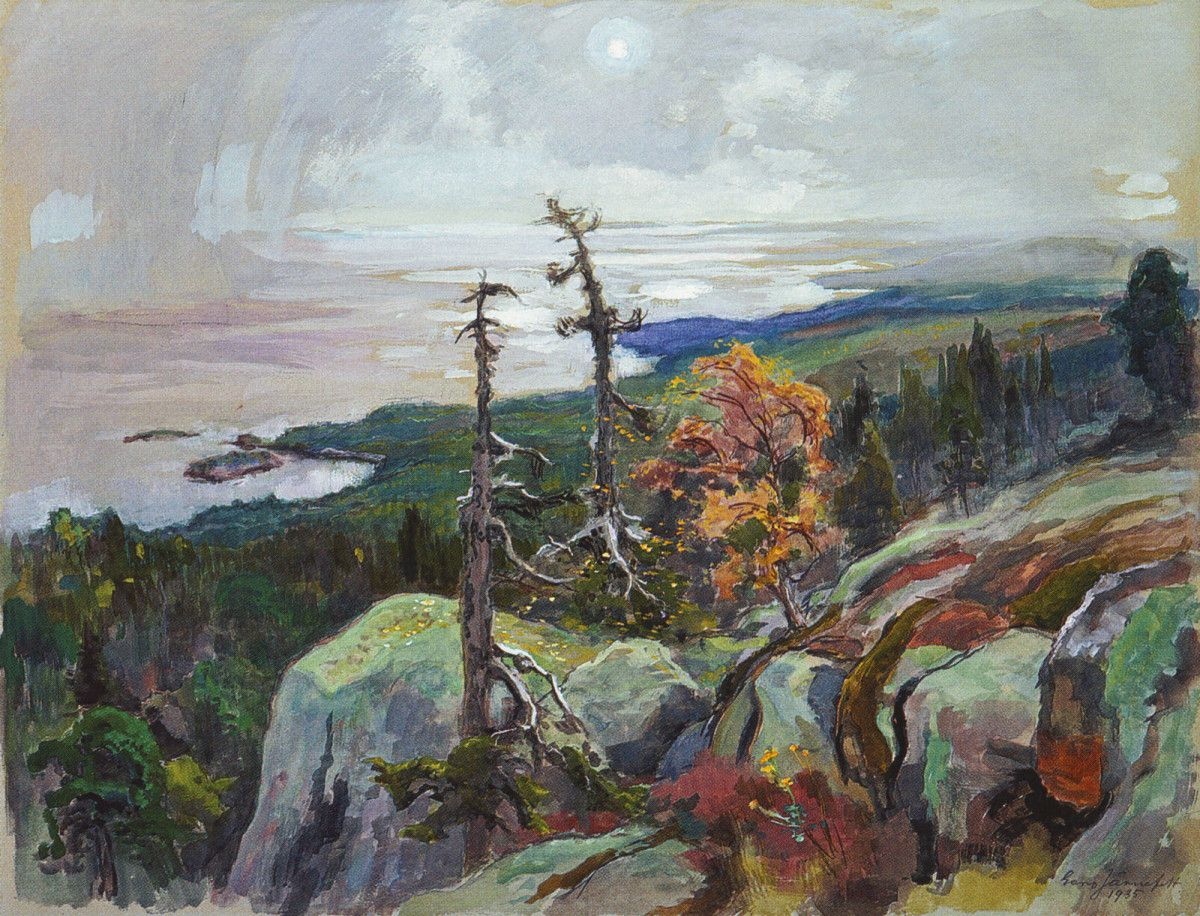
View of Koli, 1935 painting by Eero Järnefelt.

Koli National Park (Finnish: Kolin kansallispuisto) is a national park in the municipalities of Joensuu, Lieksa and Kontiolahti in the North Karelia region of Finland. It covers 30 square kilometres (12 sq mi) of forested hills on the western shore of Lake Pielinen. The park was established in 1991 and is currently governed by the Metsähallitus. It was originally governed by the Finnish Forest Research Institute, which is also called the Metla.

Koli National Park preserves the traditional agricultural heritage of the area. The park was once a pagan sacrificial site, and was later used for slash-and-burn agriculture. While fields in the park are no longer slashed and burned, hay is cut yearly and traditional Finnish breeds of cow and sheep graze in the meadows of Koli.

According to central protection objectives, Koli National Park is divided into three main zones.

Stringent attention is paid to the natural landscape and geological aspects of the mountaintop zone of Koli. In this culture zone, a variety of traditional landscapes is maintained through burn-beating, grazing, and rotating open fields, among other methods. In particular, the multiform flora of open fields needs annual mowing to be preserved.

In the nature zone is the forest landscape of the hills, which are also protected. Koli's terrain varies widely, allowing for many different biotopes in a small area and a great variety of species. The rocky terrain is relatively rugged but contains dense plant growth.

== Attractions ==
A popular vantage point in the park is the summit of Koli Hill, named Ukko-Koli, which offers a grand view to the east over Pielinen Lake. The Heritage Center Ukko and Hotel Koli are situated near the point. Two long scenic lifts operate at the location during the summer.

There are also many caves in the Koli area, such as Pirunkirkko, which is 34 metres (112 ft) long and 1–7 metres (3.3–23.0 ft) high.

Koli has inspired many painters and composers, such as Jean Sibelius, Juhani Aho and Eero Järnefelt. Järnefelt painted a large landscape scene with A.W. Finch and Ilmari Aalto in 1911. This painting can be seen in the Helsinki railway station restaurant. Painters discovered Koli in the 19th century, and it has been called one of the best natural scenes in Finland.

There are two ski resorts in the Koli area: Loma-Koli for families and Ukko-Koli for more advanced downhill skiers. There are three ski lifts and six ski slopes in Ukko-Koli. The highest vertical drop is 230 metres (750 ft) and ski slopes range from 800–1,500 metres (2,600–4,900 ft) long. There are four ski lifts and six ski slopes in Loma-Koli. The highest vertical drop is 145 metres (476 ft) and ski slopes are 530–1,050 metres (1,740–3,440 ft) long. Two of the slopes are for snowboarding. There are also snow castles for children.

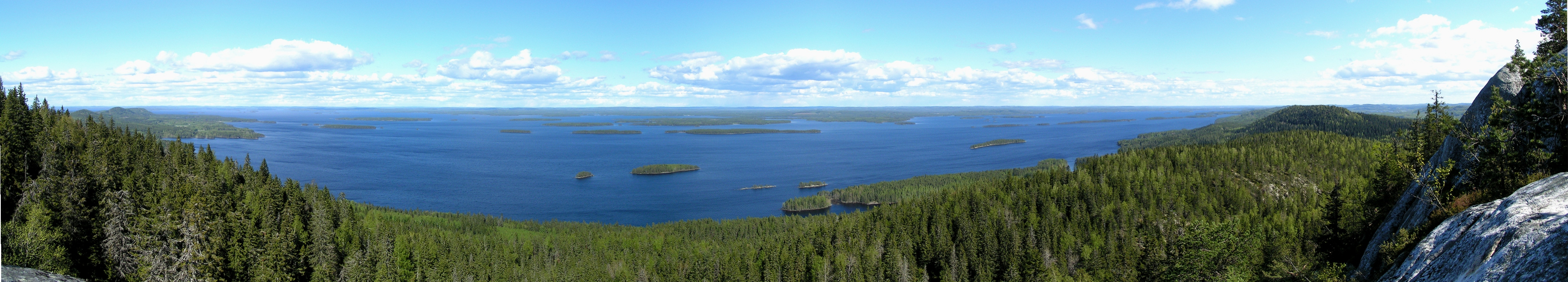
Lake Pielinen seen from a hill in Koli National Park.

== See also ==
- List of national parks of Finland
- Protected areas of Finland
