= Juuka =

Juuka Juga
- Municipality
- Juuan kunta Juga kommun
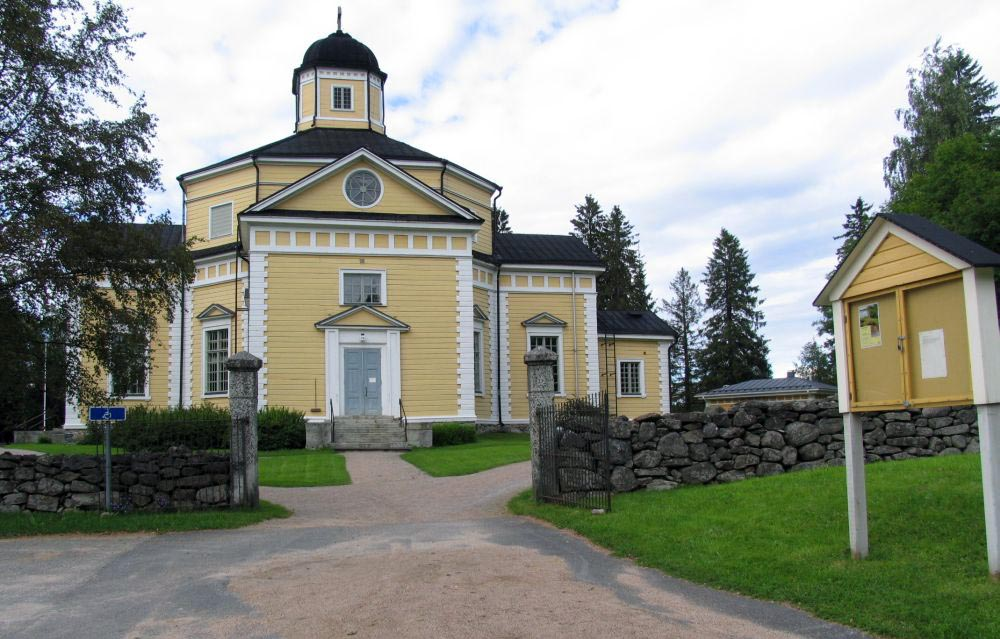
- Juuka Church

- Coat of arms

- Location of Juuka in Finland
- Interactive map of Juuka
- Coordinates: 63°14.5′N 029°15′E
- Country: Finland
- Region: North Karelia
- Sub-region: Joensuu
- Charter: 1868

Government
  - Municipal manager: Markus Hirvonen

Area (2018-01-01)
  - Total: 1,846.58 km^{2} (712.97 sq mi)
  - Land: 1,501.7 km^{2} (579.8 sq mi)
  - Water: 344.78 km^{2} (133.12 sq mi)
  - Rank: 43rd largest in Finland

Population (2025-12-31)
  - Total: 4,059
  - Rank: 186th largest in Finland
  - Density: 2.7/km^{2} (7.0/sq mi)

Population by native language
  - Finnish: 96.3% (official)
  - Others: 3.7%

Population by age
  - 0 to 14: 9.7%
  - 15 to 64: 52.6%
  - 65 or older: 37.6%
- Time zone: UTC+02:00 (EET)
  - Summer (DST): UTC+03:00 (EEST)
- Website: www.juuka.fi

Juuka (Finnish: [ˈjuːkɑ]; Swedish: Juga) is a municipality of Finland. It is located in the North Karelia region. The municipality has a population of 4,059 (31 December 2025) and covers an area of 1,846.58 square kilometres (712.97 sq mi) of which 344.78 km^{2} (133.12 sq mi) is water. The population density is 2.7 inhabitants per square kilometre (7.0/sq mi).

The municipality is unilingually Finnish.

== Geography ==
Juuka as a whole consists of 20 villages. The large expanse of Juuka consists of:

- Ahmovaara
- Halivaara (Hali)
- Juuka
- Kannas
- Kajoo
- Kuhnusta
- Larinsaari
- Matara
- Nunnanlahti
- Paalasmaa
- Petrovaara
- Pihlajavaara
- Polvela
- Raholanvaara (Rahola)
- Timovaara
- Tuopanjoki
- Vaikko
- Vihtasuo
- Vuokko

The neighboring municipalities of Juuka are Kuopio, Kaavi, Kontiolahti, Lieksa, Nurmes, Polvijärvi and Rautavaara. The former neighboring municipalities are the Nurmes rural municipality, which was annexed to Nurmes in 1973, Pielisjärvi, which was also connected to Lieksa in 1973, and Säyneinen, which was annexed to Juankoski in 1971; Juankoski, on the other hand, was connected to Kuopio in 2017.

== Etymology ==
Juuka means a river that flows through a lake. The village of Juuka dates back to the 16th century. In the late 19th century, settlements began to be settled along the roads and shops were established by the banks of the Lake Pielinen.

The parish of Juuka was initially a prayer room separated from the parts of the parishes of Pielisjärvi and Nurmes and its own parish from 1873. The present church was completed in the 1850s, but was preceded by two earlier churches.

== Juuan Elli ==
Ellinpäivät is a scenario where in four days different associations, communities, and companies arrange events for each day. To get information about these events there is a notification in the newspaper Vaarojen Sanomat. In the paper there is info and a timetable for the events. The board selects the people in charge of the scenario. Elli refers to the figurehead of the scenario and a new figurehead is chosen every year.

The events can include concerts, market events, the declaring of a new Elli, and a new event called “Juuret Juuassa –ryhmän Rehvit”. Essentially, the event is a car show where many retro cars and their drivers can be found. For that reason, it's often called a rally for older youngsters.

== Notable people ==
- Sakari Timonen
- Erkki Toivanen
- Tuula Peltonen
- Pia Lamberg, Miss Finland winner of 2011.
- Heikki Turunen, author living in Juuka.
- Eino Kettunen, composer. Most notable for Ievan Polkka.
