= Pielinen =

Lake in North Karelia, Finland

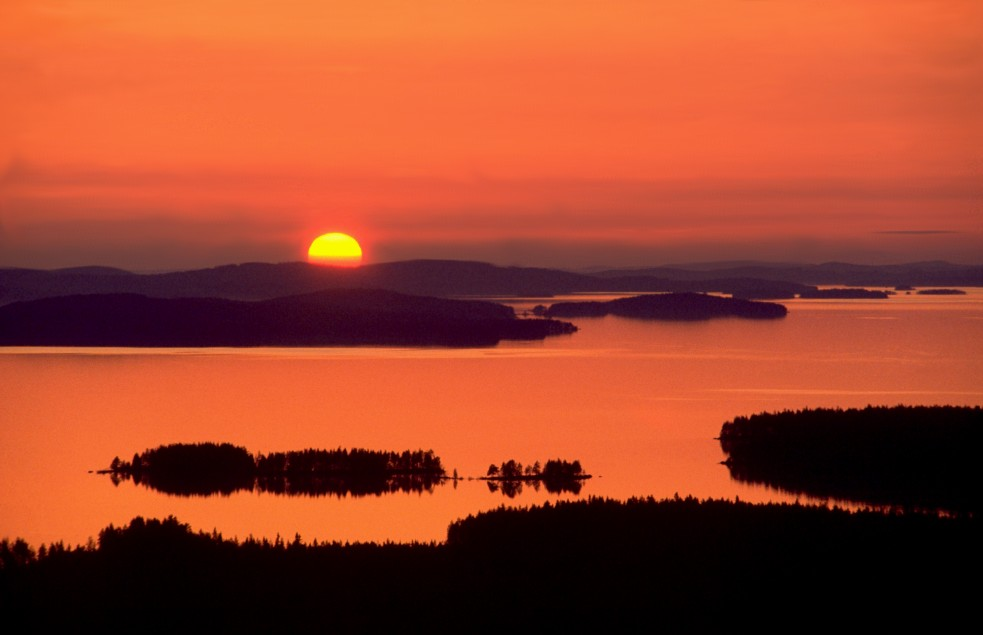
- Pielinen as seen from Räsävaara.

- Location within Finland
- Location: North Karelia
- Coordinates: 63°15′N 29°40′E
- Lake type: Mesotrophic
- Primary inflows: Jongunjoki, Koitajoki, Lieksanjoki
- Primary outflows: Pielisjoki
- Catchment area: 12,823 km^{2} (4,951 sq mi)
- Basin countries: Finland
- Max. length: 120 km (75 mi)
- Max. width: 40 km (25 mi)
- Surface area: 894.21 km^{2} (345.26 sq mi)
- Average depth: 9.9 m (32 ft)
- Max. depth: 60 m (200 ft)
- Water volume: 8.5 km^{3} (2.0 cu mi)
- Residence time: 1.9 years
- Shore length^{1}: 1,700 km (1,100 mi)
- Surface elevation: 93.7 m (307 ft)
- Islands: Paalasmaa (27.2 km^{2}), Kynsisaari (13.7 km^{2}), Porosaari (10.4 km^{2}), Toinensaari (8.2 km^{2}), Hattusaari (6.3 km^{2}), Koveronsaari (6.1 km^{2}) and Retusaari (5.6 km^{2})
- Settlements: Juuka, Lieksa, Nurmes
- ^{1} Shore length is not a well-defined measure.

Pielinen (Swedish: Pielisjärvi) is the fourth largest lake of Finland, with a drainage basin area of 12,823 km^{2} (4,951 mi^{2}) equally distributed between eastern Finland and Russia. The creation of the lake and its outlet is attributed to a post-glacial isostatic rebound, which resulted in uplift of the land. As is common in Finnish lakes, the lake's color is dark, due to the high proportion of bogs present in the catchment of the drainage basin that drains humic substances.

Pielinen Lake is in the northernmost part of Finnish Karelia in the region of North Karelia. It is adjacent to Koli National Park, known for its scenery in summer, and winter skiing; and is near the whitewater rafting centres at Ruunaa Hiking Center, Lieksa and Nurmes.

== Geography ==
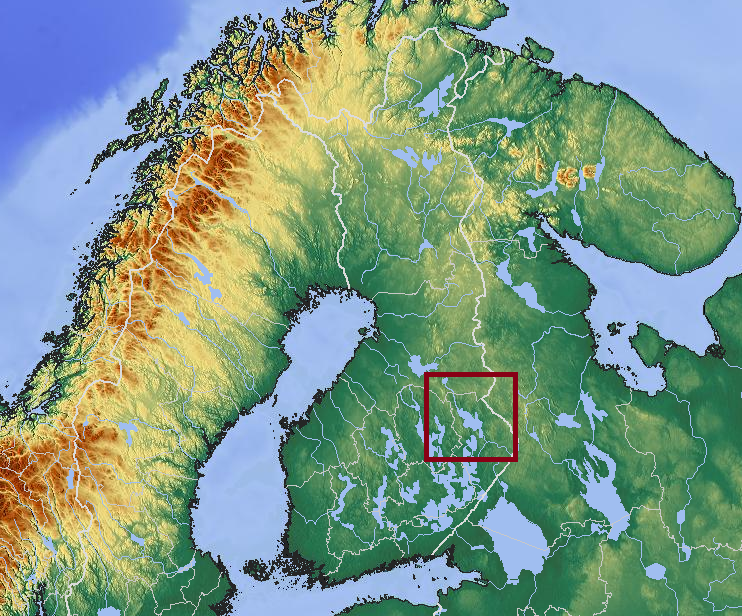
Location

The lake is located at an elevation of 93.7 m (307 ft) in the North Karelia region in eastern Finland. It has a water spread area of 894.21 km^{2} (345.26 mi^{2}) and a shore length of 1,700 km (1,100 mi), and is bound within geographical coordinates of 62°54–63°33N and 29°07–30°14E. The maximum length is 120 kilometres (75 mi) and the width varies from 1 to 40 km (0.62 to 24.85 mi). The lake's drainage area of 12,823 km^{2} (4,951 mi^{2}) is equally distributed between Finland and Russia. The maximum depth of water in the lake is 60 m (200 ft) with a reported mean depth of 9.9 m (32 ft). The water courses that drain into the lake are the Haapajarvi-Valtimojarvi and Saramojoki from its north-west direction, Viekinjoki River and Lieksanjoki River from the north-east side, and flows from the small drainage basin of the Juvanjoki River into the west. The lake has many islands such the Paalasmaa (27.2 km^{2}), Kynsisaari (13.7 km^{2} (5.3 sq mi)), Porosaari (10.4 km^{2} (4.0 sq mi)), Toinensaari (8.2 km^{2} (3.2 sq mi)), Hattusaari (6.3 km^{2} (2.4 sq mi)), Koveronsaari (6.1 km^{2} (2.4 sq mi)) and Retusaari (5.6 km^{2} (2.2 sq mi)). The lake drains, unregulated, southward through the Pielisjoki River into the larger Saimaa Lake of the large Vuoksi watercourse, which is used for timber floating. The variation in water level is limited to 1.2 m (47 in); water transport on the lake is thus substantial. The catchment of the lake is densely forested, particularly on its rugged western shore, which is capped by Koli hill. At (347 metres (1,138 ft)), the point is the highest mountain in the catchment.

The shores have a diverse landscape including barren lands, rock faces, exposed soils and beaches. Land use within the Finnish part of the catchment of the lake consists of mostly of forest, which takes up 56.6% of the total area of 7,063 km^{2} (2,727 mi^{2}); swamp accounts for another 27.2%; agricultural land takes 6.1%; with residential area and others using up 5.5%. The basin area is inhabited by 83,400 people (41,700 rural and 41,700 urban population). The two towns in the basin are Nurmes, at the northern tip of the lake, and Lieksa on the eastern shore, which have a population of 18,700 and 11,500 respectively. The Koli National Park forms the western shore of the lake.

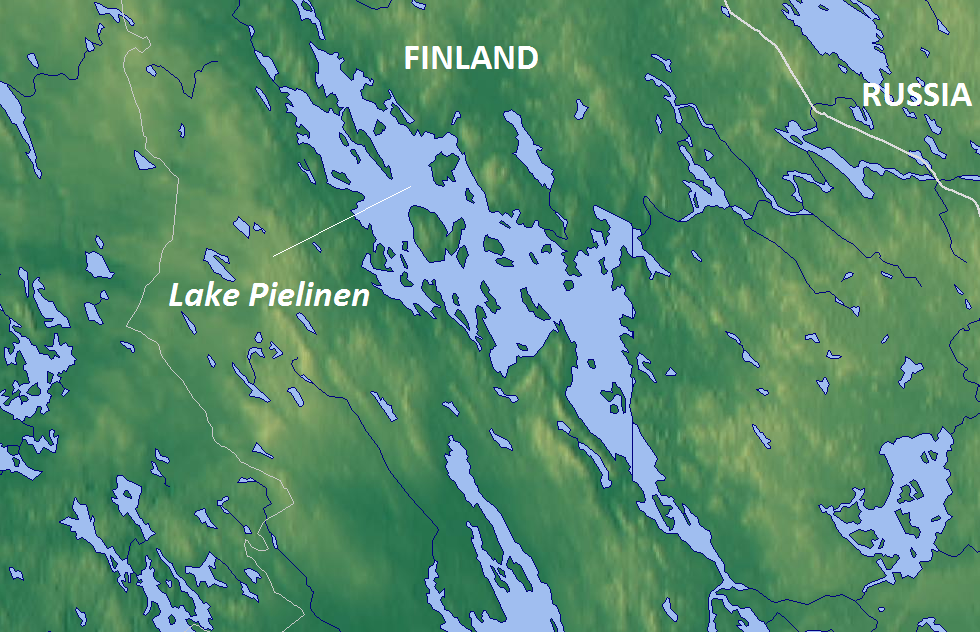
Map of the lake

The wooded vegetation is mainly made up of coniferous forests (Pinus sylvestris, Picea abies), partly deciduous forests (Betula sp.) with the drainage basin categorized as belonging to the northern zone of conifers. The herbaceous vegetation in marsh areas consists of various grasses (Poaceae), sedge (Carex sp.) and moss (Sphagnum sp.). The agricultural crops grown in the area are barley, oat, grass and potato, which are mainly used for feeding domestic animals. It is, however, reported that agricultural use is on the decline. The primary industries in the basin are related to milk, meat and wood. The secondary industries in the basin consist of cardboard, sawed goods, milk products and rubber products.

The periphery of the lake has a large network of roads and, during winter when the lake freezes, an ice road is the short route from one bank to the other.

Road 73 passes through the Uimaharju on the southern side of the lake and goes through very scenic spots to the east end. The south end of the lake has a lock system at Pielisjoki, which connects to the Saimaa Lake.

== Climate ==
The climatic data has been recorded at the two major towns in the lake basin, namely the Lieksa and Juuka during the period between 1931 and 1960. At Lieksa, the average annual rainfall was 583 mm (23.0 in) with mean minimum and maximum temperatures recorded as −7.1 °C (19.2 °F) (December) and 16.4 °C (61.5 °F) (July). During the same period, the average rainfall at Juuka was 544 mm (21.4 in) and the minimum and maximum temperatures recorded were −7.1 °C (19.2 °F) (December) and 16.1 °C (61.0 °F) (July) respectively. The lake freezes, on average, during the period from 21 November to 14 May, according to records from the years 1960 to 1980.

== Flora ==
The phytoplankton species recorded in the lake are Chlamydomonas spp., Monoraphidium confortum, M. dykowskii, Scenedesmus spp., Tabellaria flocculosa, T. fenestrata, Melosira sp., Mallomonas sp., Synura sp., Dinobryon sp., Merismopedia warmingiana, Anabaena flos-aquae and Aphanizomenon gracile.

== Fauna ==
The fauna in the lake consists of eight types of benthos and ten types of fish species, out of which nine are economically important.

The benthos recorded in the lake are: Insecta – Dicrotenipeds pulsus, Glyptotendipens spp., Polypedilum pullum, Chaoborus flavicans, Stictochironomus spp., Tanytarsus spp. and Oligochaeta – Limnodrilus hoffmeisteri.

Salmon, which was previously endemic in the lake, is now extinct. Other fish species still found are: Perca fluviatilis, Esox lucius, Rutilus rutilus, Coregonus albula, C. mulesum, C. lavaretus, Lota lota, Abramis brama, Stizostedion lucioperca and Salmo trutta lacustris.

== Water quality ==
The lake is categorized as mesotrophic. However, there are pockets of eutrophication zones. Bogs dominate the basin area, which causes flow of humic substances into the lake water. This has resulted in the lake water attaining a dark colour. This feature is said to be a typical characteristic of the lakes in Finland. Other parameters of chemical and physical properties of the lake waters measured relate to transparency (in meters), pH value, dissolved oxygen, COD, and concentrations of chlorophyll, nitrogen and phosphorus.

== Uses ==
The lake is used for navigation, particularly for the transportation of timber; timber floated in Pielinen Lake is estimated at 1.2 million tonnes per year. Other uses are as a fishery resource (the fish catch in 1981 was reported at 644 tonnes), fish products of vendace and burbot, and for recreational purposes to promote tourism. Swimming, sport-fishing and yachting are common attractions. The lake provides water to the extent of 74,000 m^{3} (2,600,000 cu ft) per day to industries and power plants.

== Threats ==
Siltation is not an issue. However, toxic contaminants are regularly monitored including mercury, zinc, copper and DDT to ensure that the standards prescribed under food safety standards, or tolerance limits for the safe use of water, are fully maintained. There is very limited pollution from sewage, municipal wastes and industrial uses, as adequate standards for sewage treatment and sanitary facilities are maintained.

== Regulations ==
The basic national law that governs the lake and its basin is the 1961 Water law (revised 1987) of Finland. The governmental ministries and agencies of Finland responsible for the complete upkeep of the lake are the Ministry of the Environment, the Ministry of Agriculture and Forestry, and the National Board of Waters and Environment.

== Attractions ==
Two major attractions around Pielinen Lake are Koli National Park and Paalasmaa Island.

=== Koli National Park ===
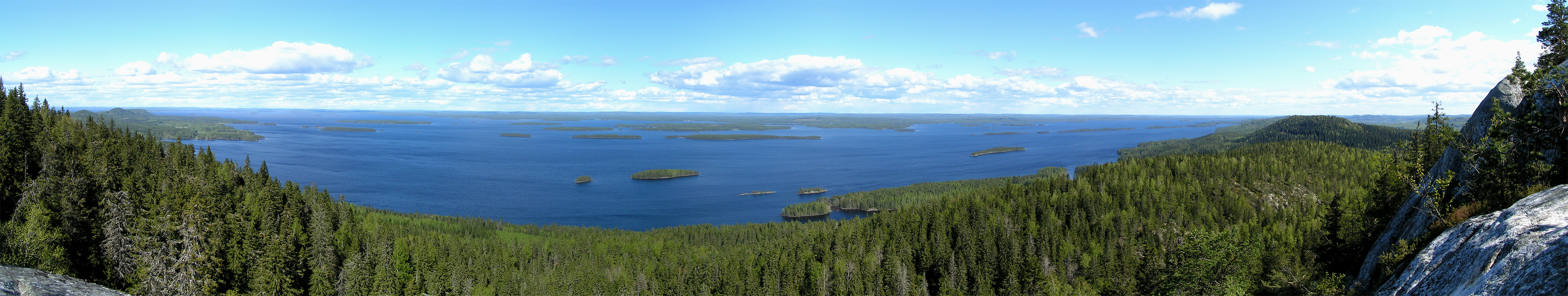
Lake Pielinen, a view from a hill in Koli National Park

Koli National Park is studded with islands, which are glorified in the Finnish national anthem as an important Finnish symbol. It was declared a National Park in 1991, after an intense debate between the environmentalist lobby and the owners of the land property over the location of the Hotel Koli, which stands at the top of its namesake hill. This park and its environs, which spread over a width of 347 m (1,138 ft), has inspired Finnish artists Pekka Halonen and Eero Järnefelt to create artistic paintings with its scenic beauty. It is approachable by ferry from the mainland. As a winter sport resort, this park provides the adventure sports of hiking and boating during summer; it has a network of walking paths, which cover nearly 90 kilometres (56 mi). A road link is also available to the hotel from the car park at the lower level. The highest point on the hill top is called the Ukko-Koli, which is linked to another peak called the Akka Koli. On the western side of Akka Koli is the "Temple of Silence," which is a place for meditation. There is a stone altar here and a cross mounted on the rock. Another peak close nearby is known as the Paha-Koli and to its south is the scenic view point known as Mäkrävaara. The village of Koli, within the park premises, has the information office, Internet facility and a post office. The visitor centre at the park is called the Luontokeskus Ukko (Ukko Nature Centre), where exhibitions are held on the history, nature and geology of the park. Two ski centres, used during the winter, are established here; they are known as Ukko-Koli and Loma-Koli, both of which boast nine lifts and 60 kilometres (37 mi) of cross country trails, with lighting along 24 kilometres (15 mi) of the trail. It is one of the most accessible ski resorts in Finland. The hills here are covered with pine and birch trees.

The national park has nine basic huts and camping grounds. There are also a marina and swimming beach on the shores of the lake, where a Finnish dancing stage called the huvilava stands. Row boats are also available for rowing across the lake.

=== Paalasmaa Island ===
The Paalasmaa Island is the largest in the lake, with its peak rising to 225 metres (738 ft) above mean sea level. Access to the island is through ferry services. An observatory tower stands on the island; old houses that reflect the history of the island can be seen along a trail marked tornille (to the tower).

== Ice Road ==
Pielinen hosts an ice road, during most winters, between the villages of Koli and Vuonislahti. The ice road is 7 kilometres (4.3 mi) long and shortens the road distance between the two villages by 60 kilometres (37 mi). The date of opening varies depending on the climatic conditions each year; the earliest the road ever opened was during the 2010-2011 winter, on the 15th day of December. Previously the winter of 1995-1996 had witnessed the earliest opening, on the 29th day of December. In the winter of 2009-2010, the road did not open until mid-January, whilst in 2008-2009 the road opened in mid-February. Helsingin Sanomat has stated that the road is probably the longest of its kind in Europe; however, this assertion is incorrect, as the Hiiumaa Ice Road in Estonia is 25 km, and is more widely believed to be Europe's longest.

== Popular interest ==
The asteroid 1536 Pielinen is named after Pielinen Lake.
