= North Karelia =

Region of Finland

North Karelia Pohjois-Karjala (Finnish) Norra Karelen (Swedish)
- Region
- Region of North Karelia; Pohjois-Karjalan maakunta Landskapet Norra Karelen
- Flag Coat of arms

- North Karelia on a map of Finland
- Coordinates: 63°00′N 30°00′E
- Country: Finland
- Historical province: Karelia
- Capital: Joensuu
- Other towns: Kitee, Lieksa, Nurmes and Outokumpu

Government
  - Regional Mayor: Markus Hirvonen

Area
  - Total: 21,584.41 km^{2} (8,333.79 sq mi)

Population (2023)
  - Total: 162,312
  - Density: 7.51987/km^{2} (19.4764/sq mi)

GDP
  - Total: €4.814 billion (2015)
  - Per capita: €29,174 (2015)
- Time zone: UTC+2 (EET)
  - Summer (DST): UTC+3 (EEST)
- ISO 3166 code: FI-13
- NUTS: 133
- Regional animal: Brown bear
- Regional bird: Cuckoo
- Regional fish: Lake salmon
- Regional flower: Prickly rose
- Regional stone: Soapstone
- Regional lake: Lake Pielinen
- Website: pohjois-karjala.fi

North Karelia (or Northern Karelia, Finnish: Pohjois-Karjala; Swedish: Norra Karelen) is a region in eastern Finland. It borders the regions of Kainuu, North Savo, South Savo and South Karelia, as well as Russia's Republic of Karelia. It is the easternmost region of Finland and shares a 300 kilometres (190 mi) border with Russia. The university city of Joensuu is the capital and the largest settlement of the region.

North Karelia has successfully reduced chronic diseases through public health measures. In the 1960s Finland led industrialized nations in heart disease mortality rates; North Karelia had Finland's highest incidence. In 1972 a long-term project was undertaken which targeted this risk in North Karelia. The resulting improvement in public health is still considered remarkable, a model for the rest of the nation. North Karelia is also known as the most sociable region in Finland.

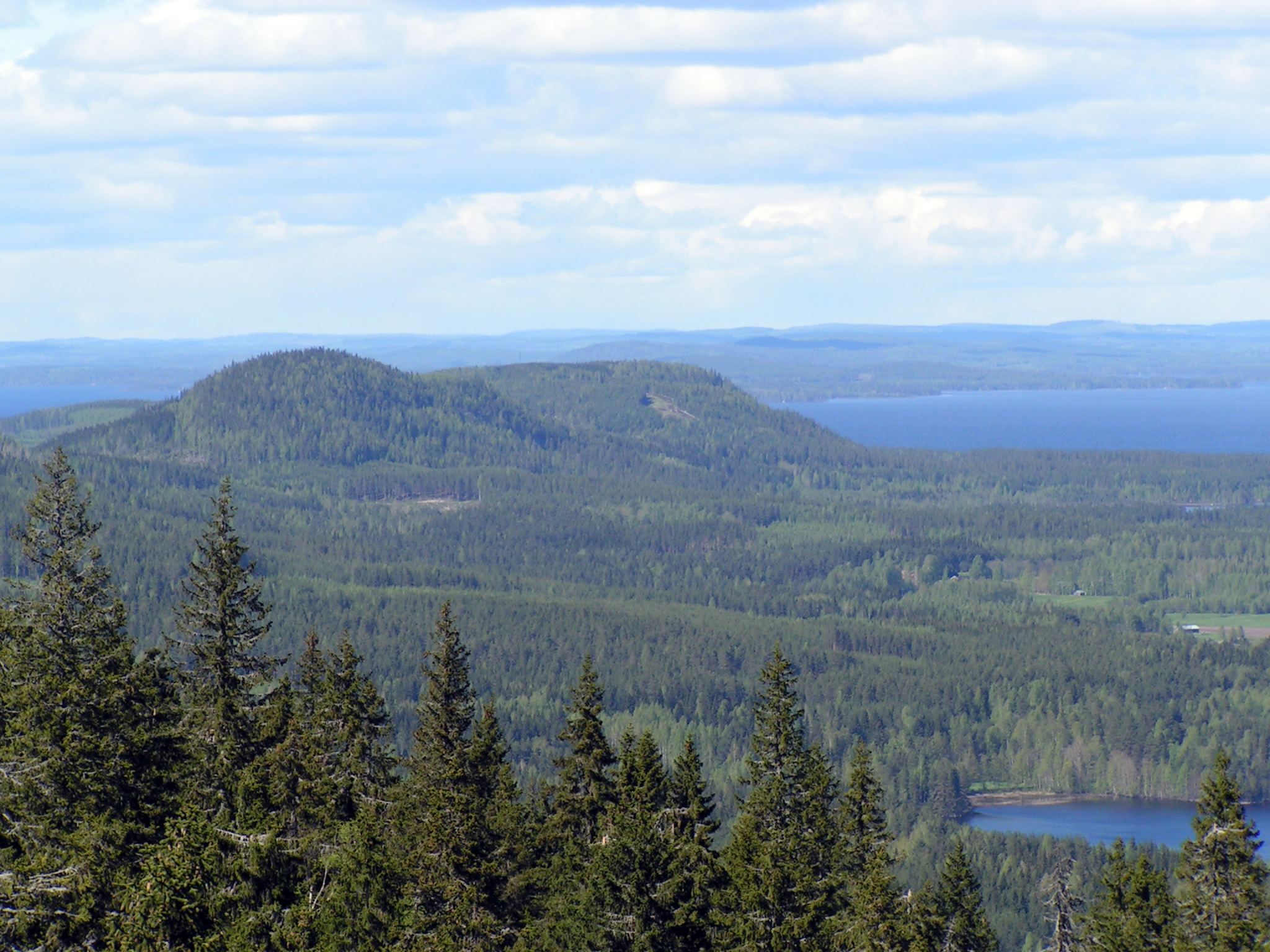
View from a hill in Koli National Park, the most famous tourist attraction in North Karelia

== History ==
The borders of remote North Karelia were formed gradually. Important border foundations were the Treaty of Stolbovo (1617) for the eastern border and the Treaty of Teusina (1595) for the western border. The border was finally established in the Treaty of Nystad (1721), where North Karelia was separated from the "other Karelias" that remained on Russia's side.

Regional identity began to form gradually in the 18th century. In 1767, the häradshövding (judge) used the name Pohjois-Karjala (North Karelia). The residents also called themselves the men of the province and drew up their own regulations in Finnish for the border guard, showing their separateness. Administratively, North Karelia belonged to different counties in the 18th century, but it had its own "North Karelia county". This self-administration set it apart from other regions. The separation was further strengthened when North Karelia was formed into its own province in 1960. North Karelia became its own region in 1994. Instead, North Karelia province was abolished in 1997 and its functions were transferred to the Eastern Finland province.

The first shots of the Winter War between the Soviet Union and Finland were fired in Lieksa on 30 November 1939. Fighting in Ilomantsi took place during both the Winter War (1939 Battle of Ilomantsi) and the Continuation War (1944 Battle of Ilomantsi). The latter was the final battle of the Continuation War and ended with a Finnish victory.

== Heraldry ==
The coat of arms of North Karelia is composed of the arms of Karelia.

== Municipalities ==
The region of North Karelia consists of three sub-regions and 13 municipalities, five of which have city status (marked in bold).

=== Municipalities on the map ===
Cities and municipalities of North Karelia.

=== Sub-regions ===
Joensuu sub-region

- Heinävesi
- Ilomantsi (Ilomants)
- **Joensuu**
- Juuka (Juga)
- Kontiolahti (Kontiolax)
- Liperi (Libelits)
- **Outokumpu**
- Polvijärvi

Central Karelia sub-region

- **Kitee** (Kides)
- Rääkkylä
- Tohmajärvi

Pielinen Karelia sub-region

- **Lieksa**
- **Nurmes**

=== List of municipalities ===
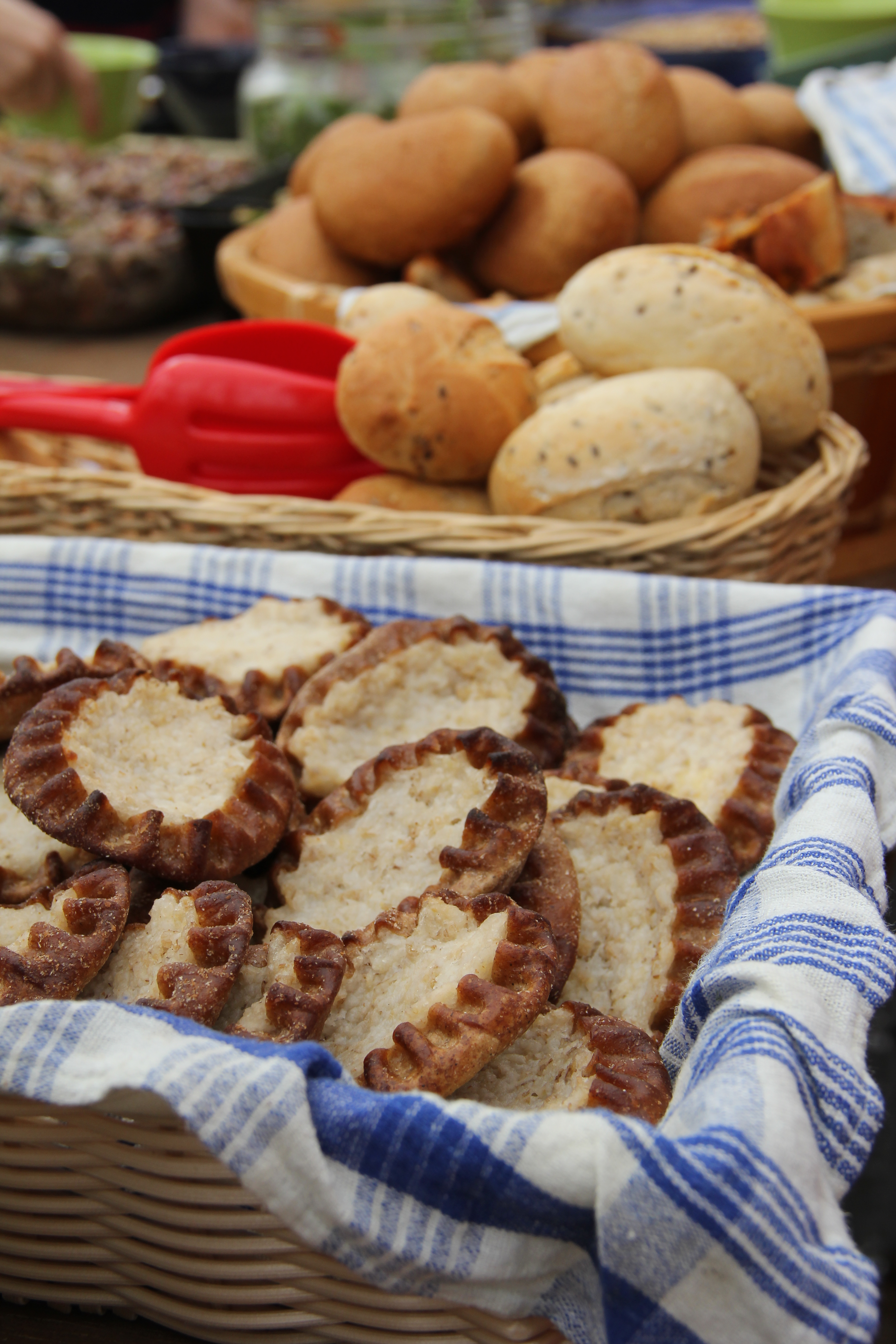
Karelian Pie

Coat of arms	Municipality	Population	Land area (km^{2})	Density (/km^{2})	Finnish speakers	Swedish speakers	Other speakers
Coat of arms of Heinävesi	Heinävesi	2,888	1,030	3	94 %	0 %	5 %
coat of arms of Ilomantsi	Ilomantsi	4,293	2,763	2	94 %	0.2 %	5 %
Coat of arms of Joensuu	Joensuu	79,129	2,382	33	91 %	0.1 %	9 %
Coat of arms of Juuka	Juuka	4,059	1,502	3	96 %	0 %	4 %
coat of arms of Kitee	Kitee	9,397	1,254	7	91 %	0 %	9 %
Coat of arms of Kontiolahti	Kontiolahti	15,060	800	19	98 %	0 %	2 %
Coat of arms of Lieksa	Lieksa	9,846	3,418	3	93 %	0 %	7 %
Coat of arms of Liperi	Liperi	11,980	727	16	97 %	0 %	3 %
Coat of arms of Nurmes	Nurmes	8,760	2,401	4	96 %	0 %	4 %
coat of arms of Outokumpu	Outokumpu	6,365	446	14	92 %	0 %	8 %
Coat of arms of Polvijärvi	Polvijärvi	3,942	805	5	98 %	0 %	2 %
Coat of arms of Rääkkylä	Rääkkylä	1,830	428	4	95 %	0 %	5 %
Coat of arms of Tohmajärvi	Tohmajärvi	3,869	838	5	93 %	0 %	6 %
	Total	161,418	18,347	9	93 %	0.1 %	7 %

== Education ==
Institutions of higher education in North Karelia include:

- University of Eastern Finland
- North Karelia University of Applied Sciences
- Riveria Vocational Education and Training

== Demographics ==
Population size 1990–2025
Year	Population
1990	182,200
1995	182,336
2000	176,187
2005	172,633
2010	169,778
2015	168,329
2020	163,537
2025	161,418

== Politics ==
For parliamentary elections, North Karelia, together with the region of North Savo, is part of the Savo-Karelia constituency. As of 2023, the constituency elects 15 of the 200 members of the Parliament of Finland.

== In popular culture ==
The song "Pohjois-Karjala" ("North Karelia") by the Finnish pop rock band Leevi and the Leavings tells the story of an urban man who dreams of returning to his native region of North Karelia. It has become such a big hit in North Karelia that it is almost perceived as a regional song.
