= Kauhaneva–Pohjankangas National Park =

National park in Finland

- IUCN category II (national park)
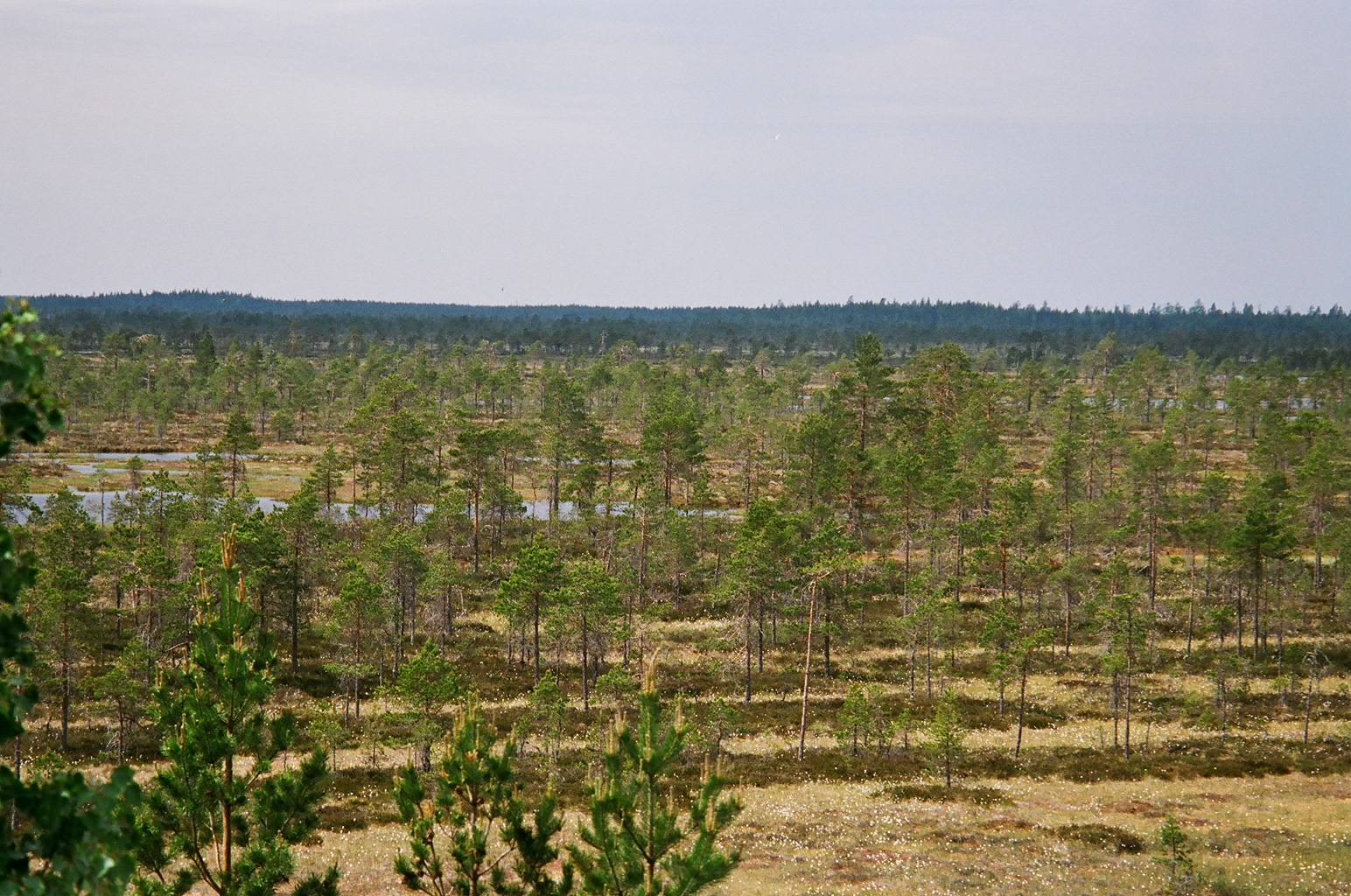
- Kauhaneva bog

- Location within Finland
- Location: Finland
- Coordinates: 62°10′45″N 22°24′23″E
- Area: 57 km^{2} (22 sq mi)
- Established: 1982
- Visitors: 26,200 (in 2024)
- Governing body: Metsähallitus
- Website: https://www.luontoon.fi/en/destinations/kauhaneva-pohjankangas-national-park

Kauhaneva–Pohjankangas National Park (Finnish: Kauhanevan–Pohjankankaan kansallispuisto) is a national park in the municipalities of Kauhajoki and Karvia in the South Ostrobothnia and Satakunta regions of Finland. Established in 1982, the park covers 57 square kilometres (22 sq mi). It consists of swamp areas, mainly bogs such as the 16.3-square-kilometre (6.3 mi^{2}) Kauhaneva bog, scattered around it.

In 2004, the park was included in the Ramsar Convention on Wetlands of International Importance. It is also part of the Natura 2000 network of protected areas.

== Geography ==
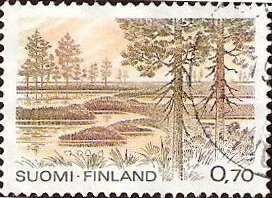
The Kauhaneva bog in a 1981 Finnish stamp designed by Pirkko Vahtero.

The Kauhaneva–Pohjankangas area is part of the south-western region of the Suomenselkä watershed area. The soil is mostly turf and the bedrock is composed of porphyric granite.

The northern parts of Kauhaneva are 170 to 177 metres (558 to 581 ft) above sea level. The southern and western parts are approximately 160 metres (520 ft) above sea level.

== See also ==
- List of national parks of Finland
- Protected areas of Finland
