= Hiidenportti National Park =

National Park of Finland

- IUCN category II (national park)
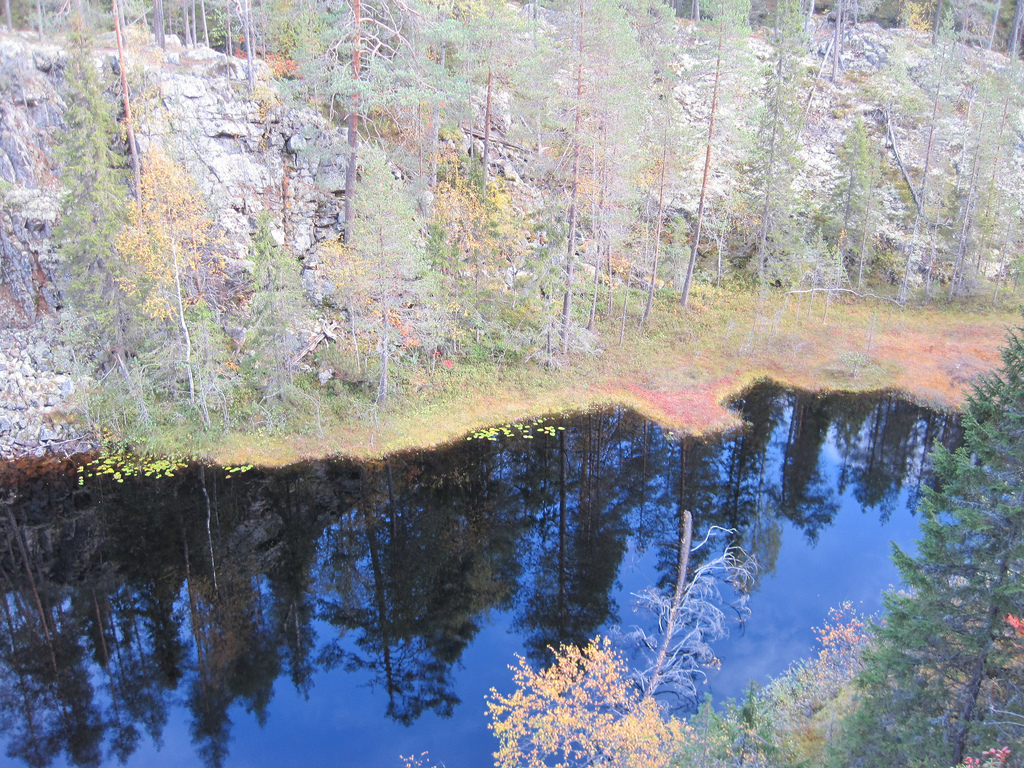

- Location within Finland
- Location: Kainuu, Finland
- Coordinates: 63°52′22″N 029°03′31″E
- Area: 45 km^{2} (17 sq mi)
- Established: 1982
- Visitors: 11,300 (in 2024)
- Governing body: Metsähallitus
- Website: www.outdoors.fi/hiidenporttinp

Hiidenportti National Park (Finnish: Hiidenportin kansallispuisto) is a national park in Sotkamo in the Kainuu region of Finland. Hiidenportti National Park was established in 1982 to preserve the region's wilderness. A mosaic mix of mires and dry forests is typical landscape in this national park. The park covers 45 square kilometres (17 sq mi).

Two thirds of the area is coniferous forest. The near-natural state forests are 100–150 years old on average. The last loggings were made in the beginning of the 20th century.

The most well-known attraction of the park is the Hiidenportti (literally "Hiisi´s gate") gulley with vertical cliffs, stretching approximately one kilometer and featuring cliff walls up to 20 metres (66 ft) high. Visitor facilities include a marked network of hiking trails and access points such as Palolampi, which serves as the main visitor entrance and offers amenities for day trips and hiking excursions.

== Fauna ==
The area is calm enough for big carnivores. Regular dwellers include Eurasian brown bear, wolverine and northern lynx. The Eurasian wolf is an occasional visitor. The North American beaver lives in the Porttijoki river and its traces can be seen along the river. In the bird fauna northern species are common, such as the brambling and the rustic bunting; also the Siberian jay can be seen in the area. The capercaillie and hazel grouse are the most abundant fowls. Rare species include bean goose, common crane, osprey, black-throated diver, great grey owl, and red-flanked bluetail. The great grey owl is also pictured in the park's emblem.

In a basic research conducted in 1992, a total of 164 big and 186 small butterfly species were identified. Among others, Catocala adultera, the emperor moth, and the endangered Xestia sincera were seen.

== See also ==
- List of national parks of Finland
- Protected areas of Finland
