= Puurijärvi-Isosuo National Park =

National park in Finland

- IUCN category II (national park)
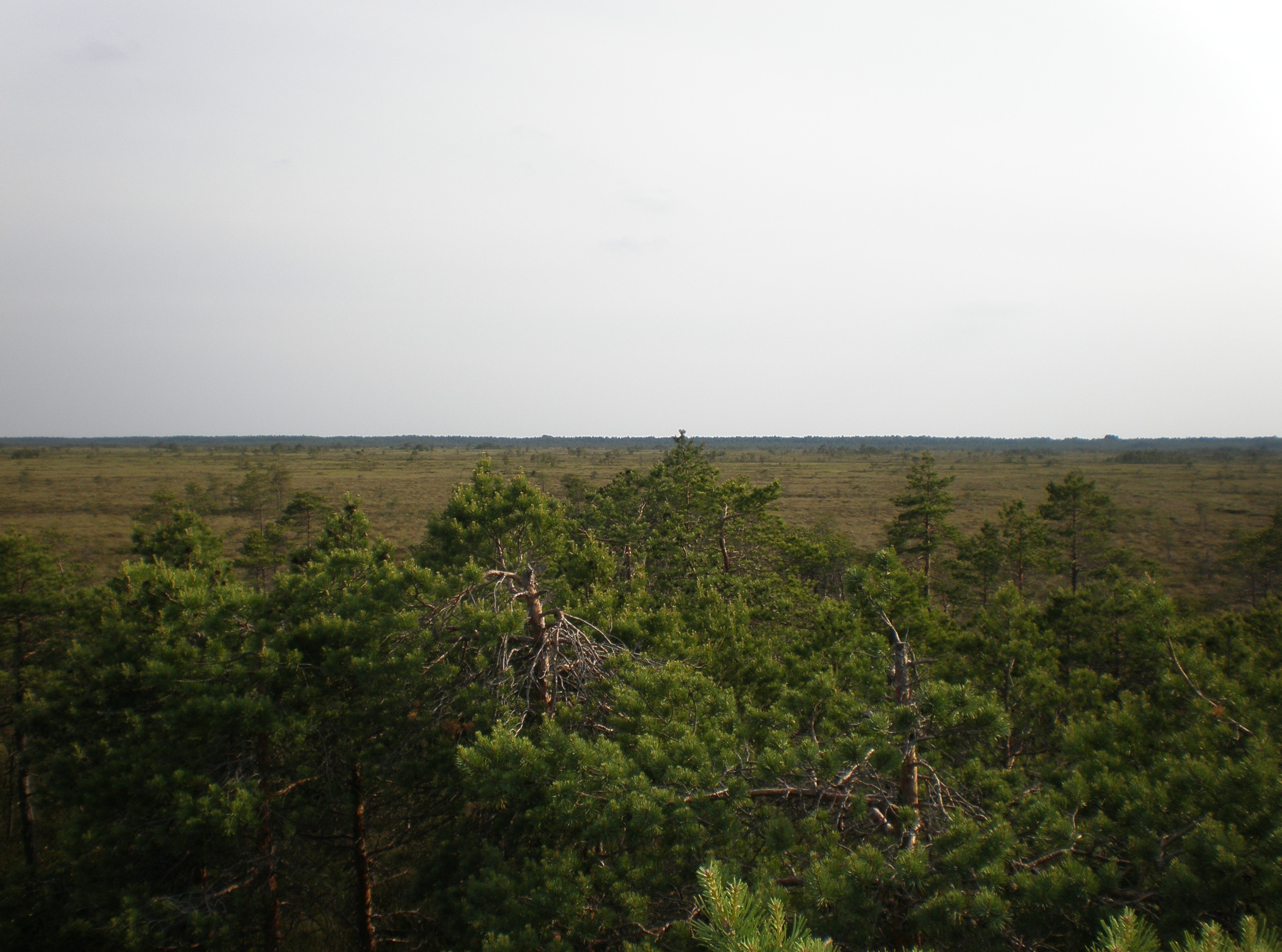

- Location within Finland
- Location: Finland
- Coordinates: 61°14′57″N 022°34′01″E
- Area: 27 km^{2} (10 sq mi)
- Established: 1993
- Visitors: 19,800 (in 2024)
- Governing body: Metsähallitus
- Website: https://www.luontoon.fi/en/destinations/puurijarvi-and-isosuo-national-park

Puurijärvi-Isosuo National Park (Finnish: Puurijärven ja Isosuon kansallispuisto) is a national park in the Pirkanmaa and Satakunta regions of Finland. It was established in 1993 and covers 27 km^{2} (10 sq mi). The area consists mainly of large swamp areas and the Puurijärvi lake. Moreover, the alluvial shores of Kokemäenjoki are on almost natural state here.

== See also ==
- List of national parks of Finland
- Protected areas of Finland
