= Seitseminen National Park =

National park in Pirkanmaa, Finland

- IUCN category II (national park)
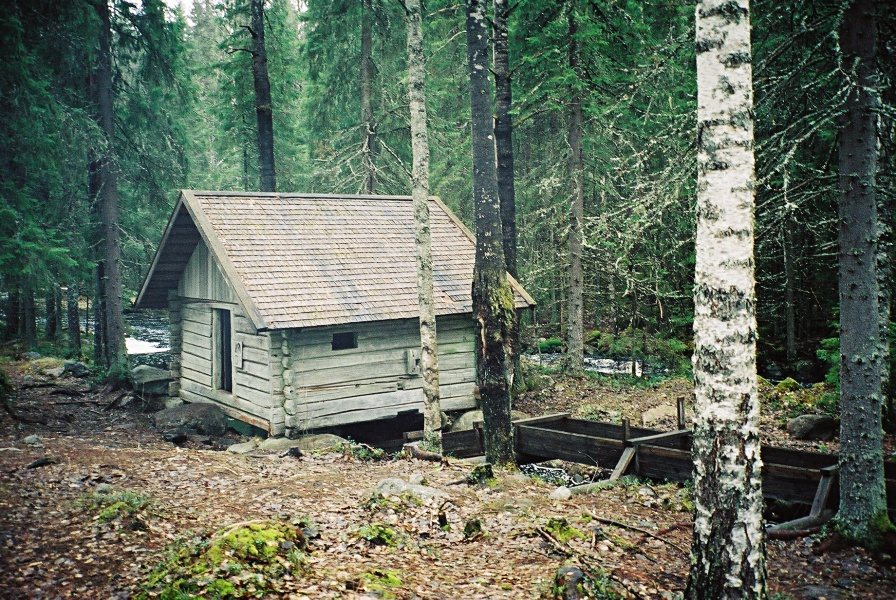
- A watermill along the Liesijoki river

- Location within Finland
- Location: Pirkanmaa, Finland
- Coordinates: 61°56′N 023°26′E
- Area: 45.5 km^{2} (17.6 sq mi)
- Established: 1982
- Visitors: 42,300 (in 2024)
- Governing body: Metsähallitus
- Website: https://www.luontoon.fi/en/destinations/seitseminen-national-park

Seitseminen National Park (Finnish: Seitsemisen kansallispuisto) is located in the municipalities of Ikaalinen and Ylöjärvi in Finland. The national park was established in 1982 and later expanded in 1989. It now covers 45.5 square kilometres (17.6 sq mi). The park is a typical mix of upland and lowland coniferous boreal forests of the Suomenselkä watershed region. Upland areas are dominated by closed productive stands of Norway spruce and Scots pine while lowland areas are covered by sphagnum swamp and bog areas that also contain stunted (Scots pine) and shrublike (Norway spruce). These swamp and bog areas appear to be barren due to the sparse tree densities. Parts of the park contain some of the most ancient and oldest forests that are accessible to public in Finland.

The Kovero Farm (Finnish: Koveron kruununmetsätorppa), a tenant farm established in 1859, is part of the cultural heritage area of the park.

Seitseminen National Park received the European Diploma of Protected Areas on 19 June 1996. It was valid until June 2011.

== Fauna ==
The mires that cover more than half of the park's area are inhabited by black grouse, common cranes, whooper swans, wood sandpipers and northern willow grouse. The old-growth forests house hole nesters such as Eurasian pygmy owls, Ural owls, three-toed woodpeckers, red-breasted flycatchers and the Siberian flying squirrel. The emblem species and a common species in the park is the pine marten.

== See also ==
- List of national parks of Finland
- Protected areas of Finland
