= Salamajärvi National Park =

National park in Finland

- IUCN category II (national park)
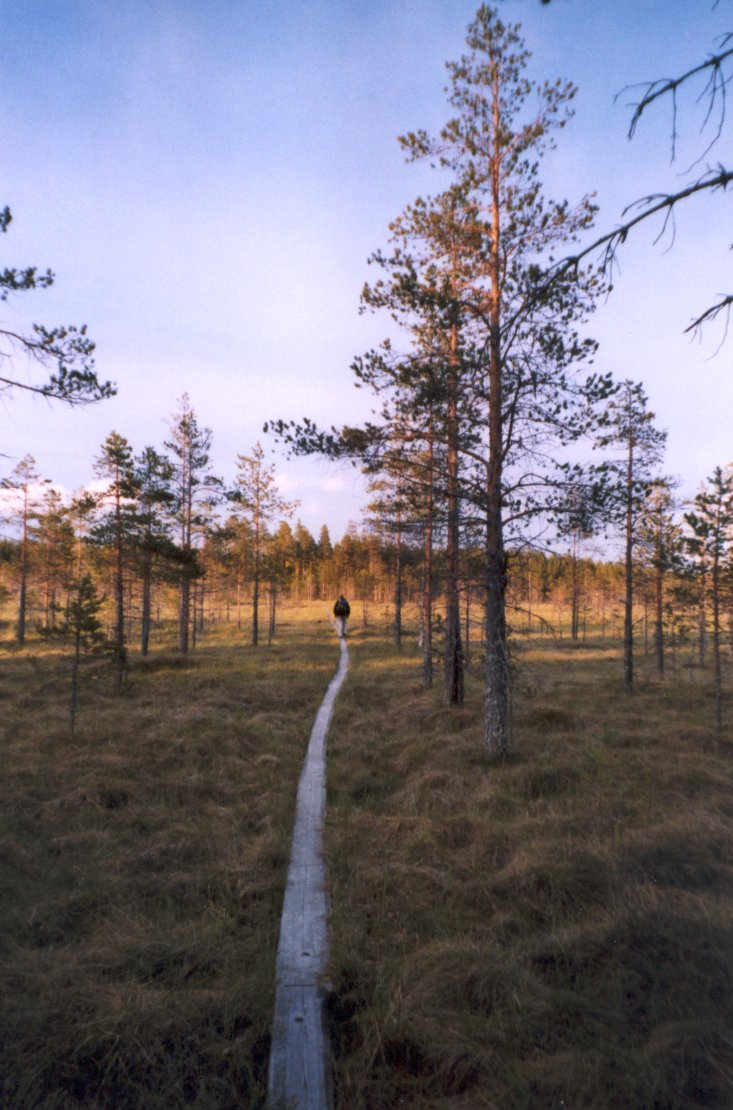

- Location within Finland
- Location: Finland
- Coordinates: 63°16′N 024°45′E
- Area: 62 km^{2} (24 sq mi)
- Established: 1982
- Visitors: 24,500 (in 2024)
- Governing body: Metsähallitus
- Website: https://www.luontoon.fi/en/destinations/salamajarvi-national-park

Salamajärvi National Park (Finnish: Salamajärven kansallispuisto) is a national park in the Central Ostrobothnia and Central Finland regions of Finland, in the municipalities of Perho, Kivijärvi and Kinnula. Salamajärvi is located in the rugged watershed region of Suomenselkä. This large, uninhabited area is especially known for its diverse mire ecosystems and its set of wilderness animals.

Salamajärvi National Park has about 60 kilometres (37 mi) of marked trails. Many of them are challenging due the rocky nature of the landscape, but some of the trails are accessible and suitable for children.

== See also ==
- List of national parks of Finland
- Protected areas of Finland
