= List of national parks of Finland =

There are 41 national parks in Finland. They are all managed by Metsähallitus. The national parks cover a total area of 9,892 square kilometres (3,819 sq mi) – 2.7% of Finland's total land area.

A total of 3.2 million people visited the parks in 2018. During the COVID-19 pandemic, the number of national park visitors strongly increased, with a total of 4.0 million people visiting the parks in 2021. In 2024 the visitor numbers had fallen back to a level of 3.6 million.

Approximately 7.4 million visits were made to state protected areas managed by Metsähallitus in 2024. In addition to national parks, the figure includes state hiking areas and other protected areas that are significant for recreational use.

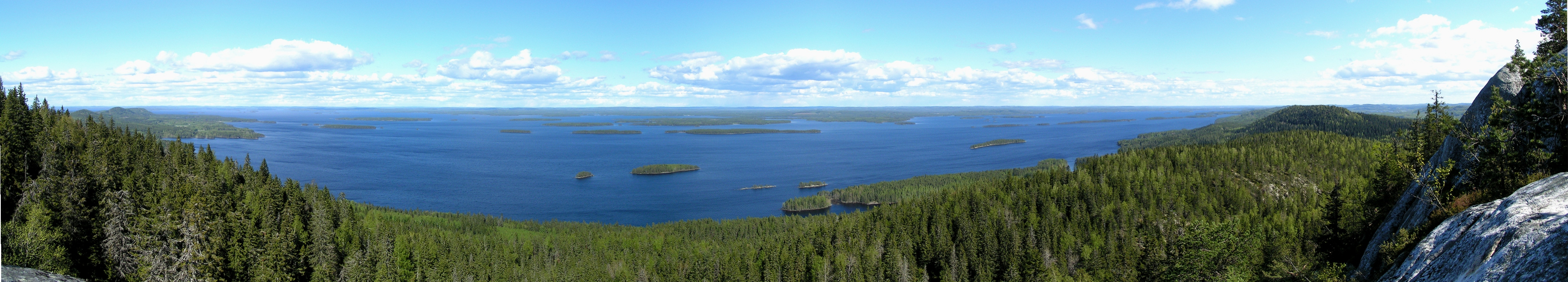
Lake Pielinen seen from a hill in Koli National Park.

== List of national parks ==
National park	Photo	Region	Land area (km^{2})	Established	Visitation (2024)	Coordinates
Archipelago		Southwest Finland	500	1982	78,800	59°54′53″N 21°52′39″E
Bothnian Bay		Lapland	2.5	1991	6,300	65°37′N 024°19′E
Bothnian Sea		Southwest Finland & Satakunta	913	2011	79,400	61°32′06″N 21°33′50″E
Eastern Gulf of Finland		Kymenlaakso	6.7	1982	15,800	60°17′5″N 27°16′26″E
Ekenäs Archipelago		Uusimaa	52	1989	53,600	59°49′22″N 23°27′15″E
Helvetinjärvi		Pirkanmaa	49.8	1982	44,000	62°2′N 23°51′E
Hiidenportti		Kainuu	45	1982	11,300	63°52′22″N 29°3′31″E
Hossa		Kainuu	11	2017	75,500	65°29′23″N 29°19′25″E
Isojärvi		Central Finland	19	1982	24,400	61°41′54″N 25°0′39″E
Kauhaneva-Pohjankangas		Southern Ostrobothnia / Satakunta	57	1982	26,200	62°10′45″N 22°24′23″E
Koli		North Karelia	30	1991	249,800	63°3′27″N 29°53′14″E
Kolovesi		South Savo	23	1990	17,200	62°15′27″N 28°49′0″E
Kurjenrahka		Southwest Finland	29	1998	66,800	60°43′14″N 22°23′1″E
Lauhanvuori		Southern Ostrobothnia	53	1982	21,700	62°09′7″N 22°10′30″E
Leivonmäki		Central Finland	29	2003	29,100	61°56′N 26°2′E
Lemmenjoki		Lapland	2,850	1956	21,100	68°30′N 25°30′E
Liesjärvi		Kanta-Häme	22	1956	57,300	60°40′50″N 23°51′30″E
Linnansaari		South Savo / North Savo	38	1956	31,600	62°6′38″N 28°30′34″E
Nuuksio		Uusimaa	45	1994	312,600	60°18′27″N 24°29′57″E
Oulanka		Northern Ostrobothnia / Lapland	270	1956	187,400	66°22′32″N 29°20′19″E
Päijänne		Päijät-Häme	14	1993	67,000	61°23′12″N 25°23′36″E
Pallas-Yllästunturi		Lapland	1,020	2005	598,800	68°9′32″N 24°2′25″E
Patvinsuo		North Karelia	105	1982	18,600	63°6′41″N 30°42′16″E
Petkeljärvi		North Karelia	6	1956	17,300	62°35′N 31°11′E
Puurijärvi-Isosuo		Pirkanmaa / Satakunta	27	1993	19,800	61°14′57″N 22°34′1″E
Pyhä-Häkki		Central Finland	13	1956	17,900	62°50′44″N 25°28′21″E
Pyhä-Luosto		Lapland	142	2005	198,900	67°3′59″N 26°58′25″E
Repovesi		Kymenlaakso / South Savo	15	2003	100,900	61°11′N 26°53′E
Riisitunturi		Lapland	77	1982	58,800	66°14′N 28°30′E
Rokua		Northern Ostrobothnia / Kainuu	4.3	1956	50,700	64°33′22″N 26°30′36″E
Salamajärvi		Central Ostrobothnia / Central Finland	62	1982	24,500	63°16′N 24°45′E
Salla		Lapland	99.83	2022	55,900	66°48′N 28°51′E
Seitseminen		Pirkanmaa	45.5	1982	42,300	61°56′N 23°26′E
Sipoonkorpi		Uusimaa	18.6	2011	165,500	60°18′54″N 25°13′8″E
Southern Konnevesi		Central Finland / North Savo	15.44	2014	30,400	62°33′30″N 26°38′50″E
Syöte		Northern Ostrobothnia / Lapland	299	2000	88,200	65°44′51″N 27°54′43″E
Teijo		Southwest Finland	33.85	2015	92,100	60°13′26″N 022°57′37″E
Tiilikkajärvi		North Savo / Kainuu	34	1982	26,100	63°40′N 28°18′E
Torronsuo		Kanta-Häme	25.5	1990	58,600	60°44′N 23°37′E
Urho Kekkonen		Lapland	2,550	1983	435,900	68°13′5″N 28°8′25″E
Valkmusa		Kymenlaakso	17	1996	20,300	60°34′N 26°44′E

== See also ==
- Protected areas of Finland
- Strict nature reserves of Finland
- Wilderness areas of Finland

Other references on Wikipedia:

- Hagen, Ekenäs
