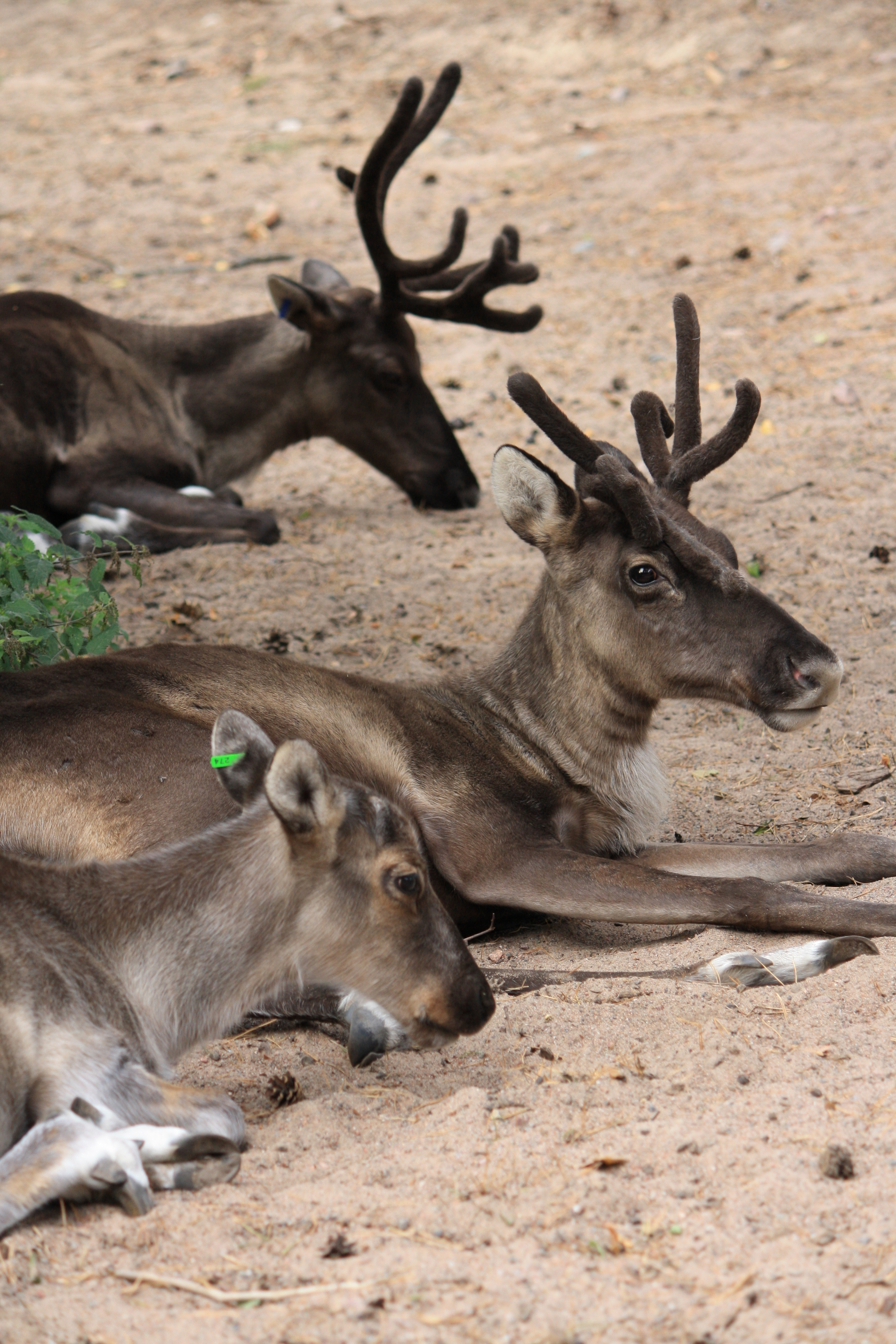

Scientific classification
- Kingdom: Animalia
- Phylum: Chordata
- Class: Mammalia
- Order: Artiodactyla
- Family: Cervidae
- Subfamily: Capreolinae
- Genus: Rangifer
- Species: R. tarandus
- Subspecies: R. t. fennicus

Trinomial name
- Rangifer tarandus fennicus (Lönnberg, 1909)

= Finnish forest reindeer =

Subspecies of deer

The Finnish forest reindeer (Finnish: metsäpeura, Russian: лесной северный олень), also known as Wild Forest Reindeer (Rangifer tarandus fennicus) or European forest reindeer is a rare subspecies of the reindeer native to Finland and northwestern Russia. They are found primarily in Russian Karelia and the provinces of North Karelia, Savonia and Kainuu in Finland, though some range into central south Finland. They are distinct from the semi-domesticated mountain reindeer (Rangifer tarandus tarandus) in their larger size, longer legs and preference for dense boreal forest habitat, where they are rarely seen by humans, over the open tundra. The Finnish herd migrates seasonally back and forth across the long Russo-Finnish border.

== Physical Characteristics ==
The Finnish forest reindeer is one of the largest subspecies of reindeer. It is 180–220 cm long and the tail 10–15 cm. The adult male is larger, weighing 150–250 kg, while adult females weigh about 100 kg. Their longer legs, wide hooves and narrower V-shaped antlers facilitate movement through deep snow and wooded habitats. Their antlers are more V-shaped and less spread out. This "slim" profile allows them to run through dense brush and timber without getting tangled.

== Range and status ==
In the 17th century, the Finnish forest reindeer ranged throughout Finland and western Russia. Hunting, reindeer husbandry and habitat degradation through forestry led to their near complete extinction in Finland by the end of the 19th century. In 1700, in Russia the population was concentrated in Kandalaksha (Kantalahti) and Lake Onega (Äänisjärvi)) but hunting and reindeer farming wiped them out in that area as well. In 1979 to 1980 they were introduced from Kainuu, Finland to middle Finland to Salamajärvi National Park. A small population of some 1,000 also thrive in Southern Ostrobothnia. While their populations have been recovering in Finland, it has been suggested that an increasing, returning wolf population may be partially responsible for slowing the recovery.

In 2013 Finnish and Russian researchers began a collaborative comprehensive population study using telemetry tags, collars linked to satellites to track the populations of the rare and threatened Rangifer tarandus fennicus, which is found in eastern Finland and northwest Russia. The estimates for the Finland population ranges from 850 reindeer to up to 2,000 or 3,000. (Note: According to an article published in Alaska Dispatch in October 2013, while the wild Finnish forest reindeer are in decline, the semi-domesticated mountain reindeer, which are kept separated from the wild reindeer, have a population of at least 200,000.)

According to a census carried out by helicopter in Finland's Kainuu region this year, the population there totals 793 individuals. There are roughly 1,000 in the Suomenselkä area, with a few dozen around the towns of Ähtäri and Lieksa. Miettunen says that levels have remained quite steady in recent years.

— Alaska Dispatch, 2013

The Finnish Ministry of the Environment considers the subspecies to be Near Threatened.

== Ecology ==
Finnish forest reindeer use the Metsola Biosphere Reserve (MBR) for summer pastures, rutting and calving, while some of these animals also use this area as winter pastures. Telemetry showed that some individual migrated in winter across the Russian-Finnish border, a distance of < 50 km. They have a harem-guarding mating system (Panchenko et al. 2021), that differs from the aggregated rutting, individual mate-tending, and synchronized calving system of tundra caribou.

== Evolution ==
Reindeer originated in a late Pliocene North American-Beringian radiation of New World deer (Geist 1998). A frontoparietal skull fragment of Rangifer sp. from the Early Pleistocene of Omsk, Russia dates back to 2.1-1.8 Ma and suggests northern Eurasia as a center of reindeer origin (Bondarev et al. 2017). Its pedicles (antler bases), unlike modern reindeer, are inclined backward and set parallel to each other, demonstrating the primitive morphology for archaic cervids.

Van Kolfschoten et al. (2011) reported fossils of reindeer in Europe from the early Middle Pleistocene of Germany, France, and England. One of the earliest fossils, an unnamed, large reindeer from Moldova

"is an archaic form of reindeer that arrived in Europe during the earlier expansion of the species. It equals in size the modern forest North American subspecies R. t caribou and R. t. terranovae... Its long metapodials [carpal and tarsal bones) with narrow epiphyses indicate adaptation to the wooded landscape" (Croitor 2010).

Among the later fossil reindeer forms, Cervus [Rangifer] guettardi — large, but with relatively small teeth — originated in a small Western Europe refugium and was a likely ancestor of R. fennicus. R. guettardi persisted into the Holocene, with dates of 11,000 and 7,200 years ago. It was apparently contemporaneous with Cervus (Rangifer) bucklandii, which was even larger than guettardi (Croitor 2018). All of these are relatively large, “primitive” forest forms that do not have the modern adaptations to grassland or to extreme cold of later types.

In contrast, all known Middle and Late Pleistocene reindeer of Eurasia — except the forest forms mentioned above — share with the advanced American barren-ground caribou a peculiar specialized antler shape with the short distance between the first and second tines. One such, R. tarandus constantini, represents “an extreme adaptation of reindeer to grazing in open, dry, periglacial environments.” It dispersed westward during the last glacial maximum (21,000 – 18,000 years BP), mixed with and replaced local European reindeer forms. Its “relatively short limb bones, simple long antlers with small palmations and large cheek-teeth mark it as an open-landscape grazer.” (Croitor 2018) Its food habits may have been similar to those of the fossil reindeer from Alaska that displayed a heavy occlusal tooth wear for young and adult animals that reflects a very abrasive diet (Rivals & Solounias 2007). Unlike modern reindeer, however, the volume of nasal cavity of R. tarandus constantini was small, indicating that this Paleolithic reindeer had not yet evolved adaptations to cold air breathing (Flerov 1952). R. t. constantini was followed by — and may have been an ancestor of — modern tundra reindeer that dispersed from Beringia during or after the last glacial maximum (LGM).

The above picture is one of primitive reindeer evolving in northern Eurasia in the Late Pliocene or earliest Pleistocene, spreading westward into Europe (and eastward into North America) and adapting to forests during an early Pleistocene interstadial when tundra retreated and forests expanded. When another ice age came and forests retreated, grassland- and then tundra-adapted “modern” reindeer evolved and spread throughout northern Eurasia; but the forest types, descended from guettardi or other archaic forest forms, persisted in Western European refugia and evolved into the Eurasian forest reindeer (R. fennicus). Isolated populations then split into Finnish forest reindeer (R. f. fennicus); Siberian forest reindeer (R. f. valentinae); the narrow-nosed forest reindeer found east of Lake Baikal (R. t. angustirostris); and the Kamchatkan reindeer (R. t. phylarchus). However, since forest and tundra reindeer do not share a direct common ancestor, they cannot be subspecies of the same species, according to the principles of phylogenetic species and subspecies definition.

== Taxonomy ==
Forest reindeer are classified as a subspecies of Eurasian tundra reindeer, Rangifer tarandus fennicus.

Although Carl Linnaeus named reindeer in 1758, and naturalists and trained taxonomists since then named many species of reindeer, the Finnish forest reindeer was not described until 1909 as a subspecies of Eurasian tundra reindeer: Rangifer tarandus fennicus Lönnberg, 1909. Miller Jr. (1912), recognizing its consistent morphological differences from tundra reindeer—larger body, longer legs and “skull with nasal bones narrow and highly arched; teeth relatively small”—elevated it to full species, R. fennicus. When later taxonomists named other forest reindeer in Russia as subspecies of R. fennicus because of their obvious morphological and ecological similarity as noted above under Evolution, the Finnish forest reindeer became a subspecies by monotypy: R. fennicus fennicus. Lönnberg designated the type locality as Enontekiö, Finnish Lappland, Finland.

Flerov (1933) named the Altai-Sayan forest reindeer as a subspecies of tundra reindeer, R. tarandus valentinae, but Sokolov (1937) brought both valentinae and the Kamchatka forest reindeer, phylarchus under R. fennicus, noting that measurements showed “no overlap in some ranges & means quite different” of the skull shape, especially the rostra (noses). Banfield (1961) placed fennicus back under tundra reindeer as R. tarandus fennicus, but agreed that valentinae, phylarchus, setoni and angustirostris were forest reindeer related more to Finnish forest reindeer than to tundra types. He also included several formerly named subspecies as forest reindeer synonymous with fennicus: Tarandus rangifer buskensis Millais, 1915, T. r. yukutskensis Millais, 1915, R. t. setoni Flerov, 1933, R. t. silvicola Hilzheimer, 1936, R. t. transuralensis Hilzheimer, 1936, and R. t. dichotomus Hilzheimer, 1936. They remain so.

Neiminen et al. (1980) gave measurements of a larger series of specimens, comparing them to tundra reindeer, and noted that:

"...the long legs of the wild forest reindeer are an important adaptation to taiga conditions, where the snow cover is usually deep and soft. The mountain types [R. t. tarandus] have evolved in areas with hard-backed tundra snow, and consequently the semi-domestic reindeer [domesticated forms of R. t. tarandus] have difficulty surviving in coniferous forests, especially in winters with deep, soft snow."

Geist, 1991, described “European” forest reindeer as:

“a larger, tall-legged reindeer with short, stout antlers reminiscent of barren-ground antlers, but with oval beams and a bez tine set well above the brow-tine. Woodland-type antlers as found in North American forest caribou these antlers are not! In shape they stand close to the tundra type antlers, but are more massive with some tendency for palmation.”

He described the “Altai reindeer” as similar to Finnish forest reindeer, but with “a light-coloured (sand to fox red) woodland form with a dark face and small antlers…” In a 1998 update, he named fennicus, valentinae and phylarchus as subspecies but was uncertain about the status of angustirostris.

Other taxonomists have confirmed the statistically significant morphological differences of forest reindeer, especially the proportionately longer legs (e.g., Puputti and Niskanen 2009).

Differences are not only in size and shape. The forest reindeer rumens have smaller papilli than do the semi-domesticated reindeer, R. tarandus, reflecting dietary differences between feeding habits consistent with different ecology (Soveri and Neiminen 2007).

DNA analysis has confirmed the forest reindeer's distinctiveness and genetic distance from other reindeer types. A total of 16 mtDNA control region haplotypes (unique segments of DNA inherited in the female line) were identified in forest reindeer from Karelia and Murmansk that were unique to fennicus, and no haplotypes were completely identical to tundra reindeer (Baranova et al. 2012). Kharzinova et al. (2018) also “found contrasting patterns in the genetic structure” of the tundra and forest reindeer, “in accordance with their morphological and ecological difference.” She and her colleagues then sampled reindeer domesticated by the Tuva and Tofalar people of the Altai Mountains and found that these reindeer “...are tall with rather long bodies, deep chests, well-developed muscles, and are light in color.” Statistical analysis of the mtDNA “…revealed a different genetic structure of the taiga [forest] reindeer from their counterparts inhabiting the tundra.” Nei's standard genetic distance was 28.3% and the Fixation Index was 29.9% (Kharzinova et al. 2022); both of these measures of distinctiveness are in the range that usually distinguish different genera of other cervids (see review in Harding, 2022). These results suggest that the Tuva and Tofalar people may have domesticated Altai forest reindeer, as opposed to all other domesticated types that derived from tundra reindeer.

Genetic analysis of all wild caribou and reindeer ecotypes in the world, at the coarsest level of refinement, K = 2, clearly separated North American woodland caribou from all others; K = 3, however, revealed a third distinctive genetic cluster in Finnish forest reindeer and PCA (principal components analysis) confirmed a distinctive Fennoscandian group apart from the Eurasia-Beringia clade. The secondary contact zone between the clusters is located in Eastern Finland, where admixture (interbreeding) was observed. This clustering and PCA analysis omitted Greenland and Svalbard reindeer, which were too different genetically to be included in the analysis (Yannic et al. 2013) These considerations led to the renaming of the Finnish forest reindeer as a full species Rangifer fennicus Lönnberg, 1909, in a recent revision by a single author, something not supported in the field.

== WildForestReindeerLIFE project ==
The WildForestReindeerLIFE project in Finland started in 2016, lasting seven years. The project is coordinated by Wildlife Service Finland and co-funded by the LIFE Programme. One of its main goals is to reintroduce forest reindeer to its original habitats in Suomenselkä: National Parks of Lauhanvuori and Seitseminen were chosen as the reintroduction sites. The first animals were released in 2019.

The animals moved to Suomenselkä originate from Kainuu and Finnish zoos: Korkeasaari Zoo, Ähtäri Zoo and Ranua Zoo. Zoo employees also participate in planning the daily care of the animals living in the on-site enclosures, and provide wildlife veterinarian assistance.

== Zoo population ==
There are about 150 Finnish forest reindeer in 25 European zoos. These animals have made the WildForestReindeerLIFE reintroduction project in Finland possible.

The Finnish forest reindeer has been part of European Association of Zoos and Aquaria (EAZA)'s population management plan since a studbook of the species was founded in 1998. From 2020, the species was added to the EAZA Ex-situ Programme (EEP). The programme coordinator works in Korkeasaari Zoo in Helsinki.

== Comparison with other populations of woodland reindeer globally ==
The boreal woodland caribou of the subspecies Rangifer tarandus caribou in Canada, which are also forest-dwelling and avoid humans, are also experiencing a decline in populations and were designated as threatened in 2002 by the Committee on the Status of Endangered Wildlife in Canada (COSEWIC).

External images
- A deer grazing
- Deer on a swamp
