= Linnansaari National Park =

National park in Finland

- IUCN category II (national park)
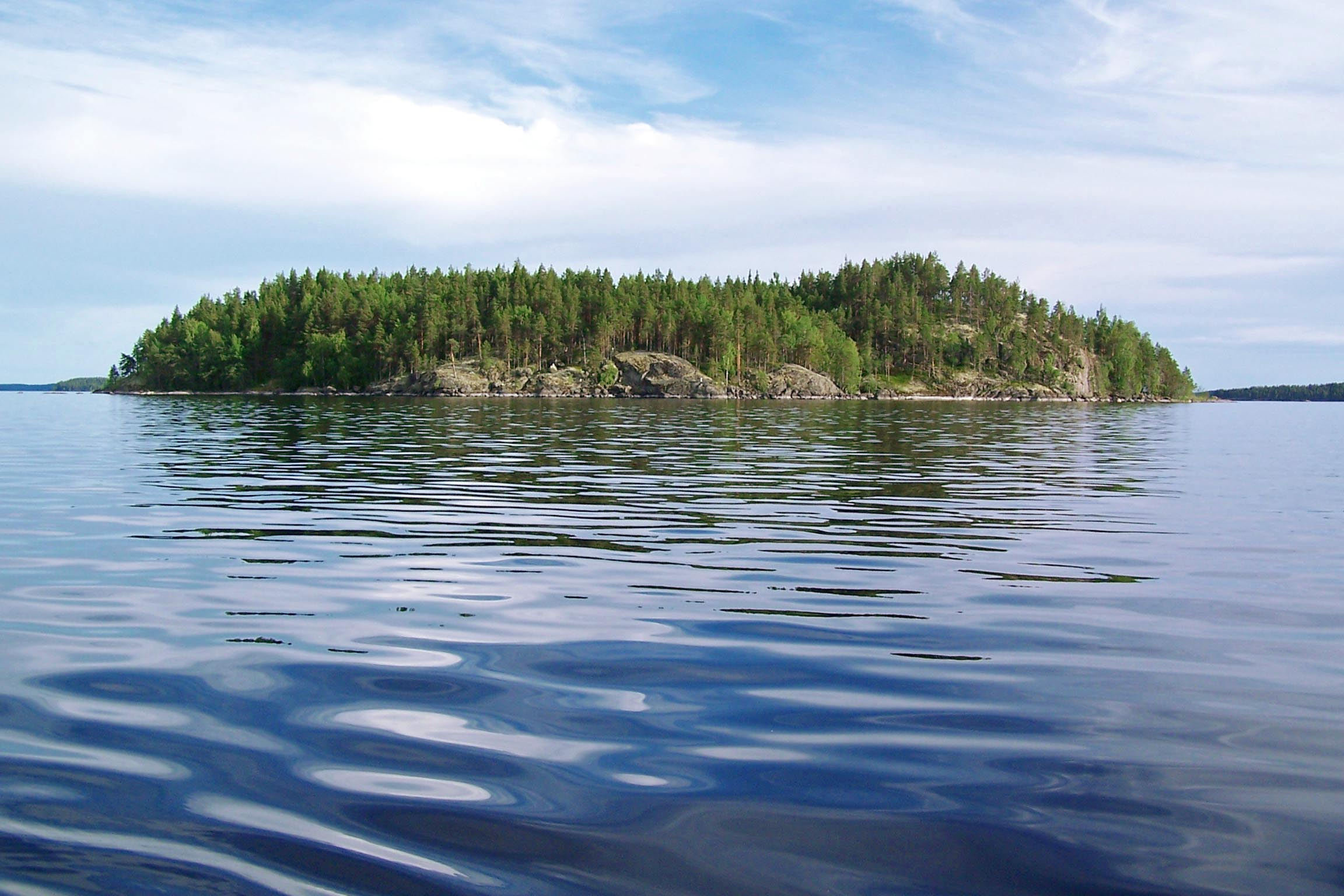

- Location within Finland
- Location: Finland
- Coordinates: 62°06′38″N 28°30′34″E
- Area: 38 km^{2} (15 sq mi)
- Established: 1956
- Visitors: 31,600 (in 2024)
- Governing body: Metsähallitus
- Website: https://www.luontoon.fi/en/destinations/linnansaari-national-park

Linnansaari National Park (Finnish: Linnansaaren kansallispuisto) is a national park in the South Savo and Northern Savonia regions of Finland. It lies in the middle of the lake Haukivesi, a part of greater Saimaa. The National Park was established to conserve the valuable natural features of the Finnish lakeland.

On the main island there's an old croft. Slash-and-burn agriculture is still practised on its fields to conserve the old cultural landscape and the associated plant and animal species. A large part of the island is natural-state coniferous forest, with some herb-rich parts.

The critically endangered Saimaa ringed seal inhabits the park.

== See also ==
- List of national parks of Finland
- Protected areas of Finland
