= Pyhä-Häkki National Park =

National park in Saarijärvi, Finland

- IUCN category II (national park)
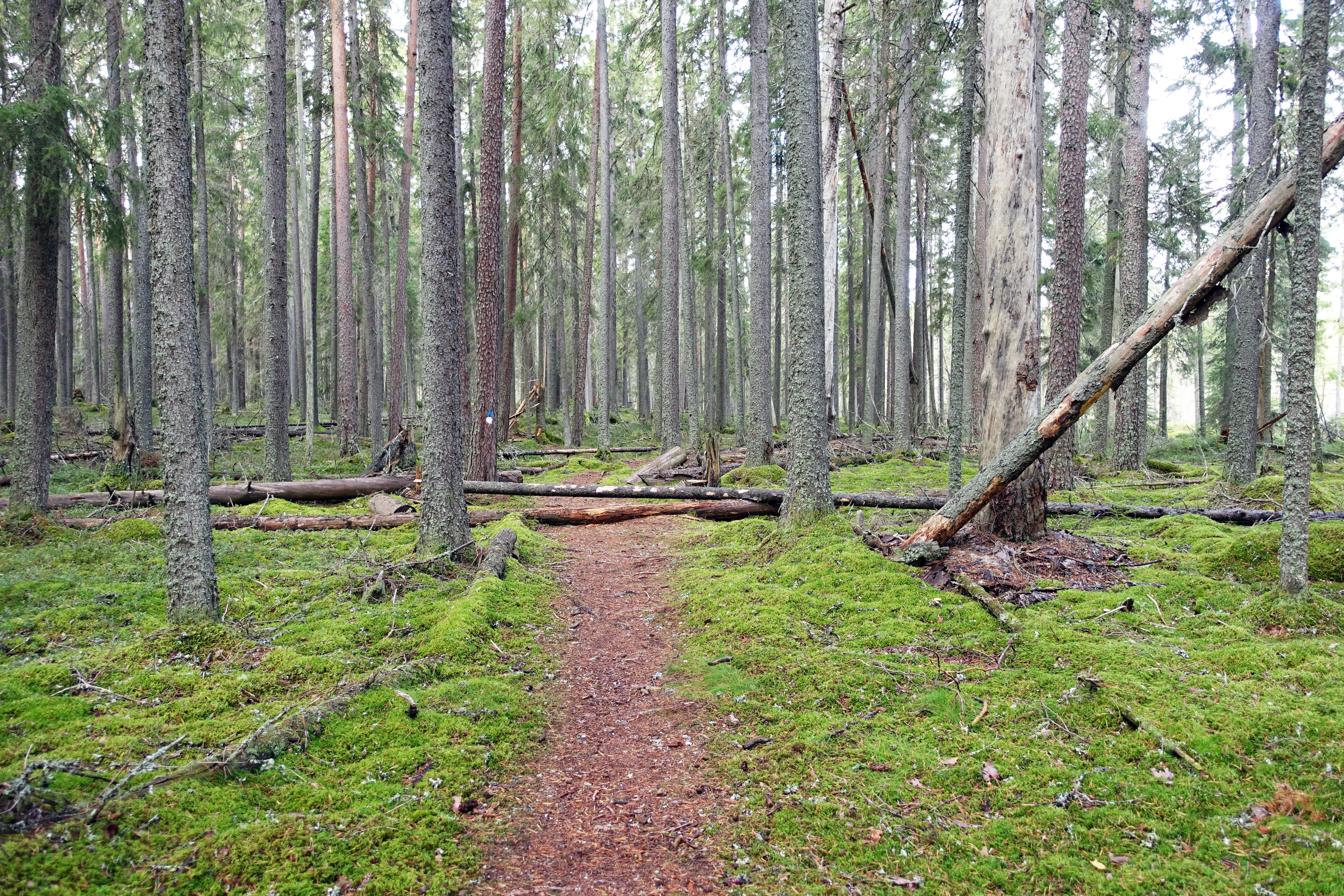
- Pyhä-Häkki National Park

- Location within Finland Location within Central Finland
- Location: Central Finland, Finland
- Coordinates: 62°50′44″N 25°28′21″E
- Area: 13 km^{2} (5.0 sq mi)
- Established: 1956
- Visitors: 17,900 (in 2024)
- Governing body: Metsähallitus
- Website: https://www.luontoon.fi/en/destinations/pyha-hakki-national-park

Pyhä-Häkki National Park (Pyhä-Häkin kansallispuisto) is a national park in Saarijärvi, Central Finland. It was established in 1956 (extended in 1982 when Kotaneva was joined to it) and covers 13 square kilometres (5 sq mi). Its foundation was planned already in the late 1930s, but the Second World War interrupted these plans.

The national park protects old Scots pine and Norway spruce copses, which started growing when Finland was still under Swedish rule, and bogs, which comprise half of the national park. The national park is the largest remaining area of virgin forest in the southern half of Finland. In addition to the pine and the spruce, Betula pendula, Betula pubescens, Populus tremula, and Alnus glutinosa (the latter along some creeks) are the taller tree species encountered in the national park.

== See also ==
- List of national parks of Finland
- Protected areas of Finland
