= Tiilikkajärvi National Park =

National park in Finland

- IUCN category II (national park)
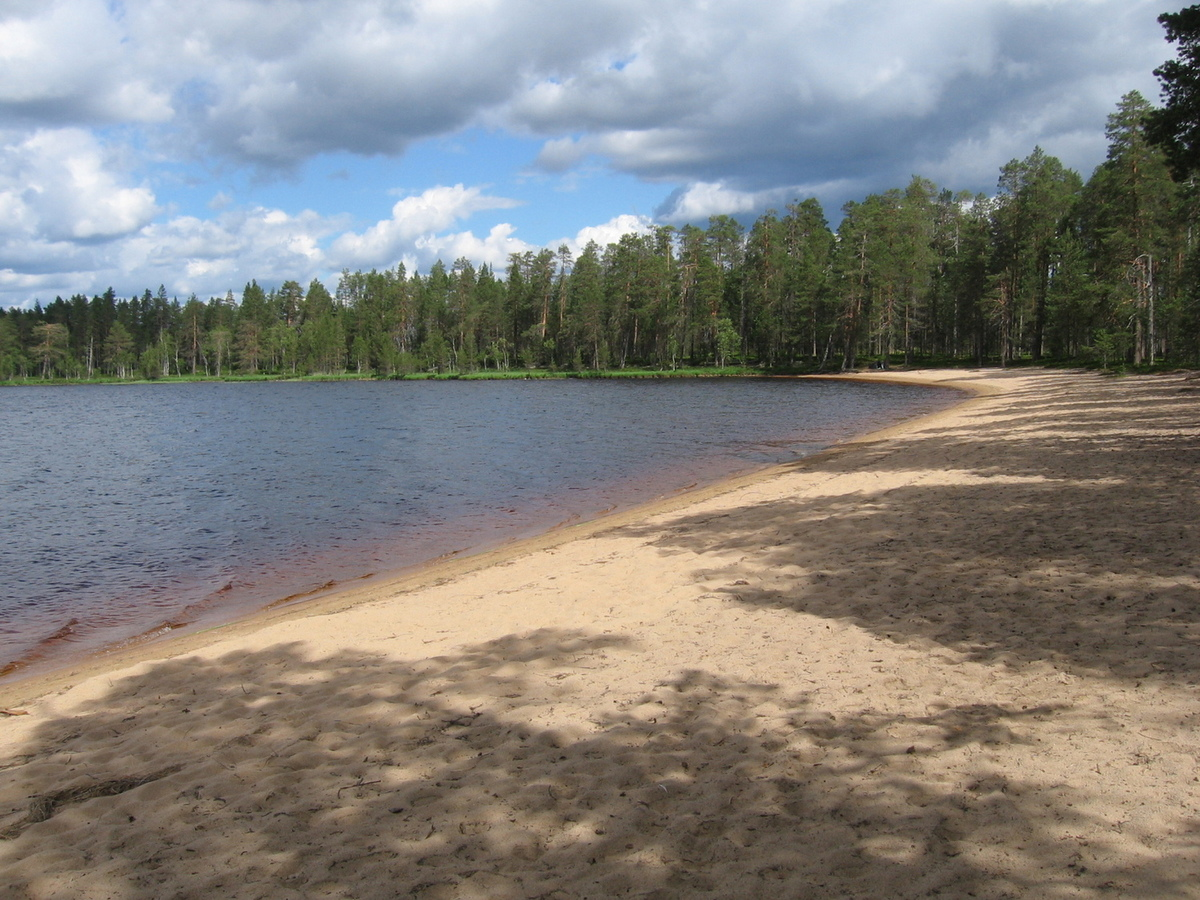
- The Venäjänhiekka beach

- Location within Finland
- Location: Finland
- Coordinates: 63°40′N 028°18′E
- Area: 34 km^{2} (13 sq mi)
- Established: 1982
- Visitors: 26,100 (in 2024)
- Governing body: Metsähallitus
- Website: www.luontoon.fi/en/destinations/tiilikkajarvi-national-park/

Tiilikkajärvi National Park (Finnish: Tiilikkajärven kansallispuisto) is a national park in Finland, located both in Rautavaara, North Savo and Sotkamo, Kainuu. It was established in 1982 and covers 72 square kilometres (28 sq mi) after its expansion in 2023, making it the second largest national park in southern Finland.

The Tiilikkajärvi lake is a barren 400 ha (1.5 mi^{2}) lake with beaches all around it, split in the middle by esker capes.

== Fauna ==
Northern bird species brambling and rustic bunting are common in the park's forests. The most common bird species of the bogs is the yellow wagtail. The Eurasian whimbrel also nests on the bogs. The barren Tiilikkajärvi lake is inhabited by the black-throated diver, and its beaches by the little ringed plover. Other species of the area include the lesser black-backed gull, capercaillie, willow grouse, bean goose, Eurasian golden plover, and the Siberian jay. In the summer of 1993, the pine grosbeak nested in the area. The beaver lives in the nearby rivers.

== Notable Sights and Visitor Experiences ==
Tiilikkajärvi National Park is known both for its natural features and historically significant sites. One of the park’s most notable landmarks is Venäjänhiekka, a long, golden sandy beach along the Tiilikkajärvi lake. This beach is frequently highlighted for both its stunning, soft sands and its place in regional history; its name and location are directly tied to the 1595 Treaty of Teusina, which established a border between Sweden and Russia running through the lake. The original border stone, engraved with a crown and a cross to symbolize the two nations, still exists and is a popular destination for visitors.

The park’s landscape is shaped by esker capes, especially Pohjoisniemi and Kalmoniemi. These long, narrow glacial formations stretch for several kilometers and almost divide the Tiilikkajärvi lake in half, creating a visually striking terrain that can be explored via well-maintained hiking trails. The eskers are covered with pine forest and offer panoramic views over the lake and surrounding aapa bogs. Kalmoniemi, at some points only a few meters wide, offers in particular a popular hiking experience.

== See also ==
- List of national parks of Finland
- Protected areas of Finland
