= Liesjärvi National Park =

National park in Finland

- IUCN category II (national park)
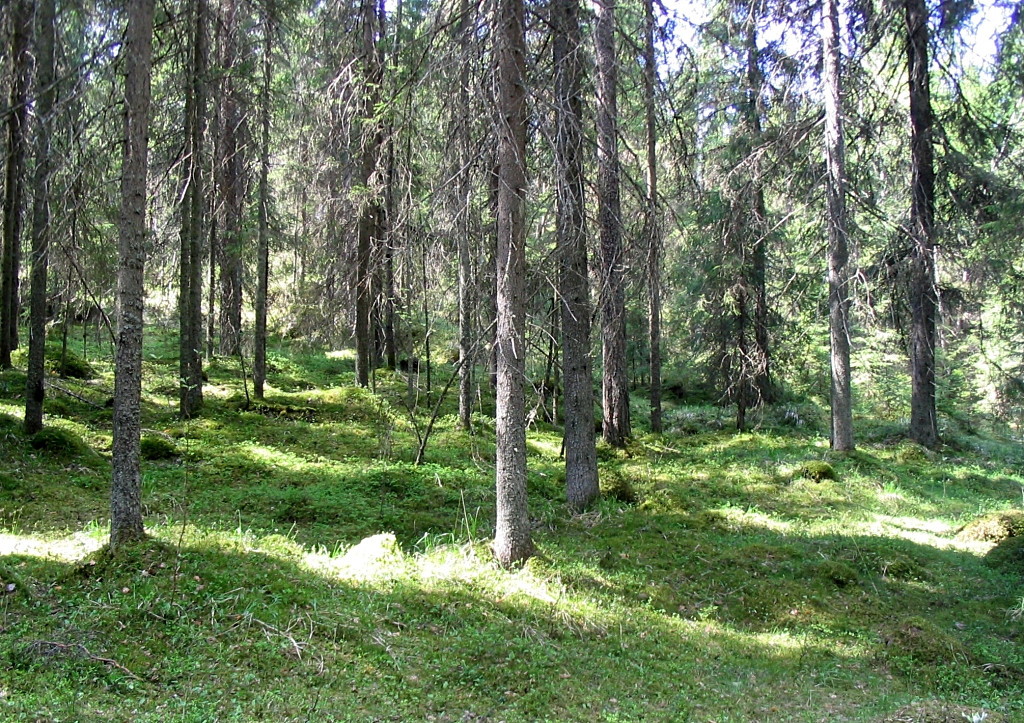
- Lush spruce forest in the Liesjärvi national park

- Location within Finland
- Location: Kanta-Häme, Finland
- Coordinates: 60°40′50″N 23°51′30″E
- Area: 22 km^{2} (8.5 sq mi)
- Established: 1956
- Visitors: 57,300 (in 2024)
- Governing body: Metsähallitus
- Website: https://www.luontoon.fi/en/destinations/liesjarvi-national-park

Liesjärvi National Park (Finnish: Liesjärven kansallispuisto) is a national park in the Kanta-Häme region of Finland. Its area is 22 square kilometres (8.5 sq mi).

In 1920, part of the present-day national park area was already defined as protected area. The relatively small park area has over 40 kilometres (25 mi) of shoreline.

As a whole, the national park is a slice of the near-natural state lake highlands of Häme. It includes the Korteniemi traditional estate, where visitors can try their skills in traditional agricultural work.

There are camping places for travel trailers and tents.

== See also ==
- List of national parks of Finland
- Protected areas of Finland
