= Helvetinjärvi National Park =

National park in the Pirkanmaa region in Finland

- IUCN category II (national park)
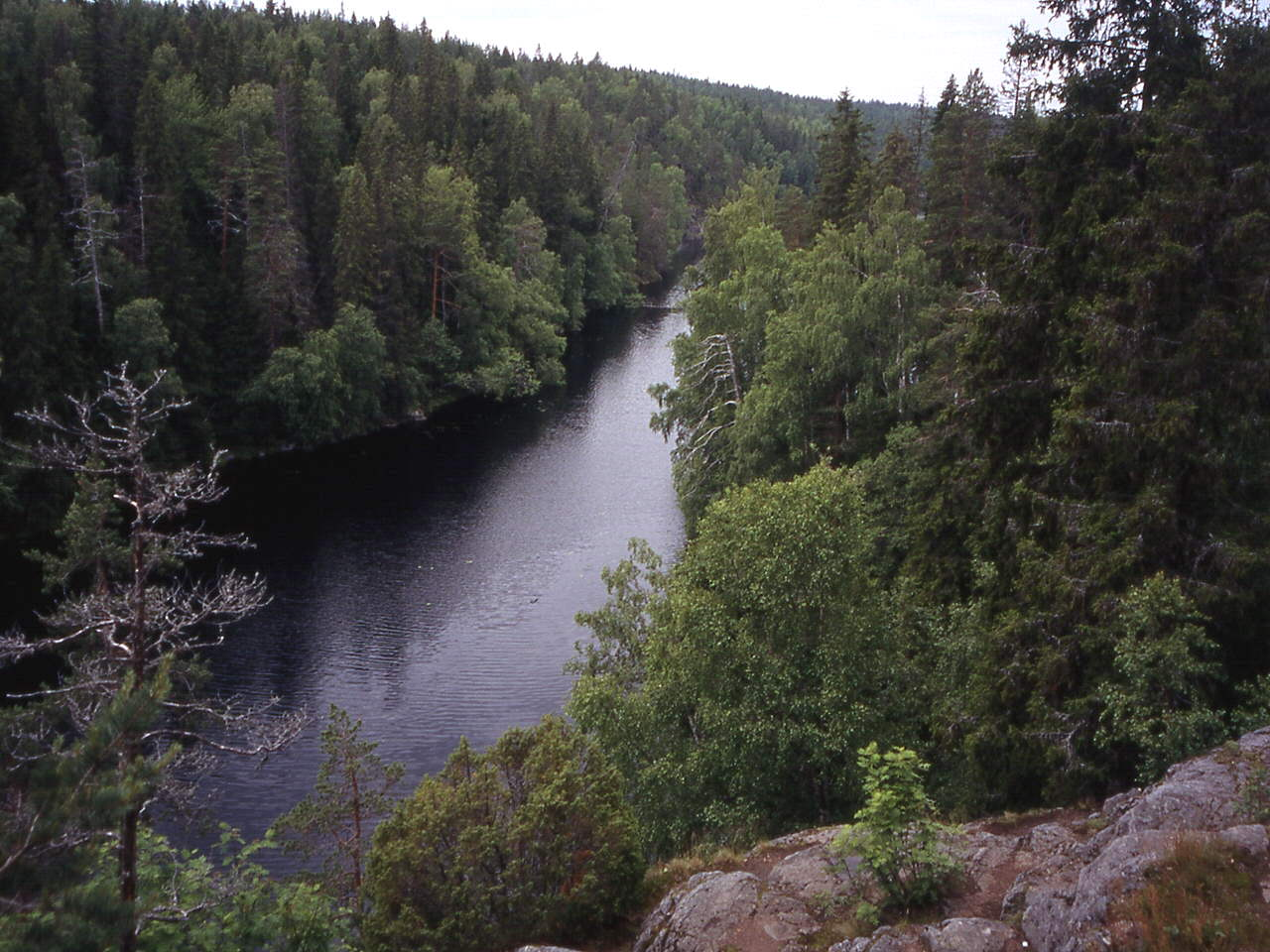
- Helvetinjärvi lake and Helvetinkolu cleft

- Location within Finland
- Location: Pirkanmaa, Finland
- Coordinates: 62°02′N 23°51′E
- Area: 49.8 km^{2} (19.2 sq mi)
- Established: 1982
- Visitors: 44,000 (in 2024)
- Governing body: Metsähallitus
- Website: https://www.luontoon.fi/en/destinations/helvetinjarvi-national-park

Helvetinjärvi National Park (Finnish: Helvetinjärven kansallispuisto, literally "Hell's Lake national park") is a national park in the Pirkanmaa region in Finland. It is located in the municipality of Ruovesi and has an area of 49.8 square kilometres (19.2 sq mi). The park was founded in 1982 and is managed by the Metsähallitus.

The park represents the wild forests of the Tavastia region. The area includes deep gorges and rugged scenery formed by faults running through the bedrock. The most well known of the several gorges in the area is Helvetinkolu at the south-eastern end of Lake Helvetinjärvi.

== See also ==
- List of national parks of Finland
- Protected areas of Finland
