= Valkmusa National Park =

National park in Finland

- IUCN category II (national park)
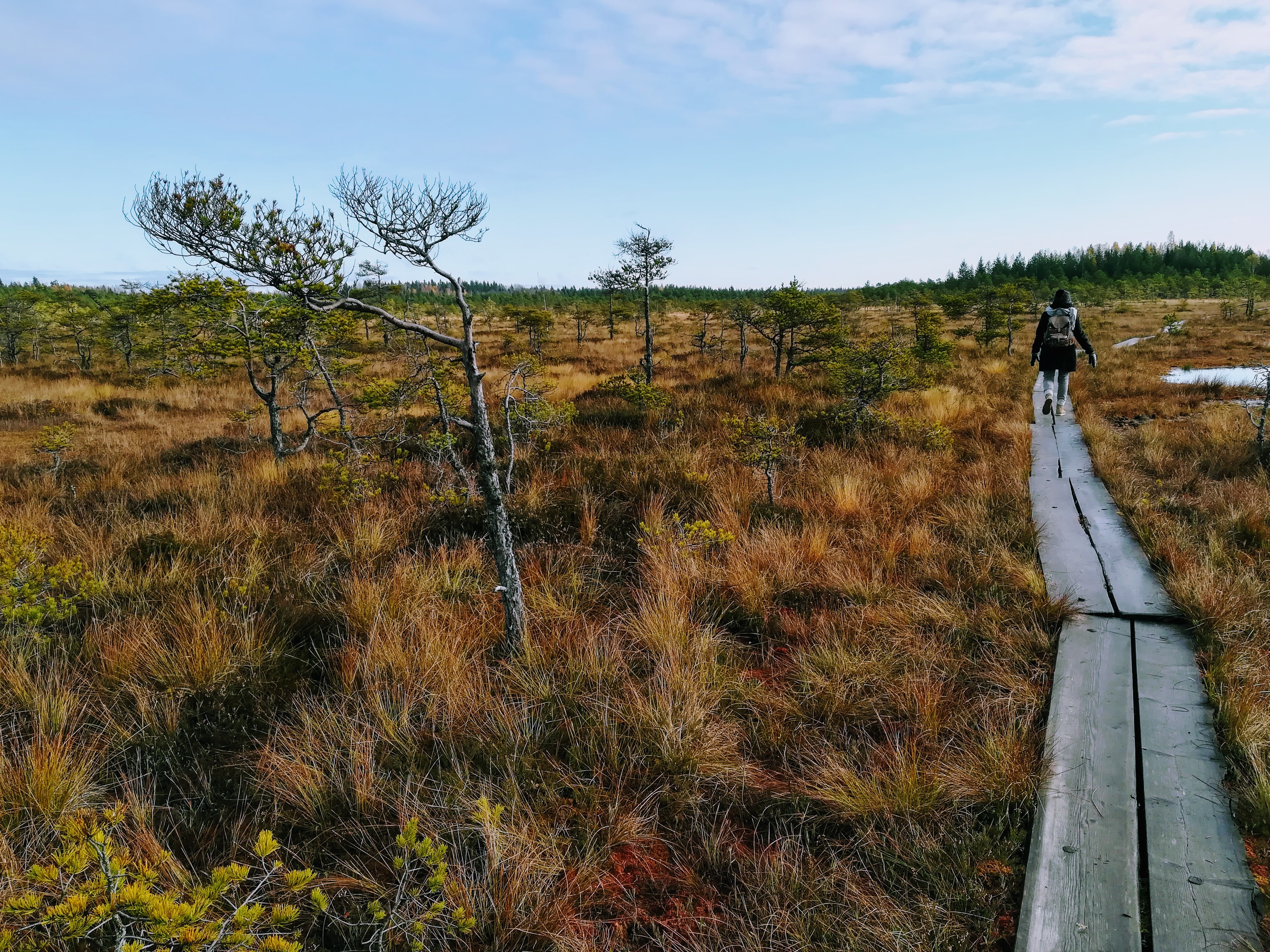
- A boarded footpath across the mire

- Location within Finland
- Location: Kymenlaakso, Finland
- Coordinates: 60°34′N 026°44′E
- Area: 17 km^{2} (6.6 sq mi)
- Established: 1996
- Visitors: 20,300 (in 2024)
- Governing body: Metsähallitus
- Website: https://www.luontoon.fi/en/destinations/valkmusa-national-park

Valkmusa National Park (Finnish: Valkmusan kansallispuisto, Swedish: Valkmusa nationalpark) is a national park in the Kymenlaakso region of Finland. It was established in 1996 and covers 17 square kilometres (6.6 sq mi).

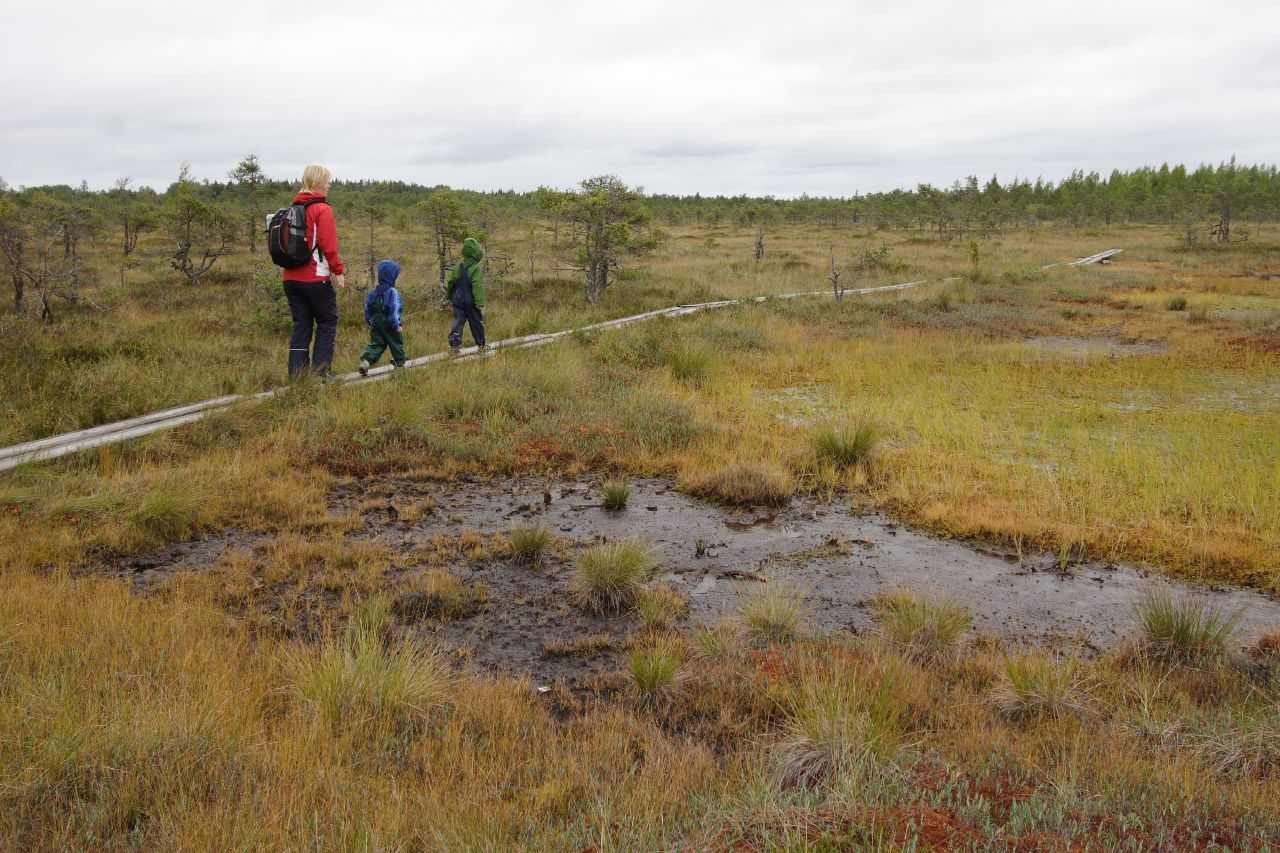
Swamps can be crossed on marked causeway routes.

The national park comprises swamp land, extraordinarily representing in southern Finland. More than 30 different swamp types can be categorised in the area.

The park has a diverse birdlife. Characteristic of the species is abundant southern avifauna, and on the other hand the occurrence of northern species, such as the willow grouse and rustic bunting. The park is an important resting place for migratory birds. There is a very representing butterfly species in the area, which comprises many endangered species. The symbol species of the park is Idaea muricata.

== See also ==
- List of national parks of Finland
- Protected areas of Finland
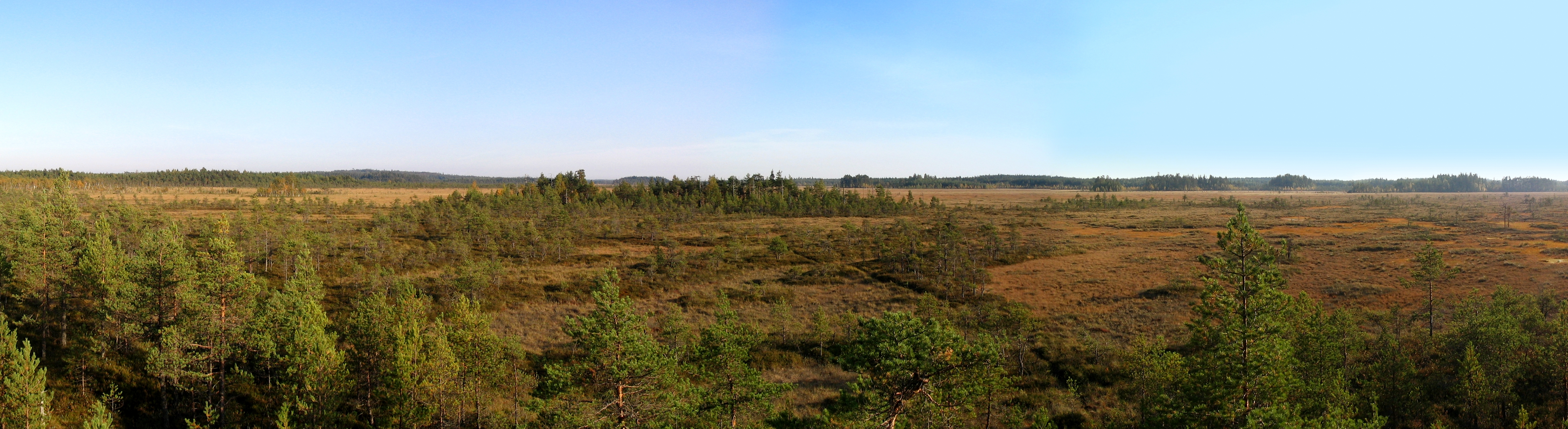
A view from Valkmusa bird watching tower
