= Eastern Gulf of Finland National Park =

National park in Finland

- IUCN category II (national park)
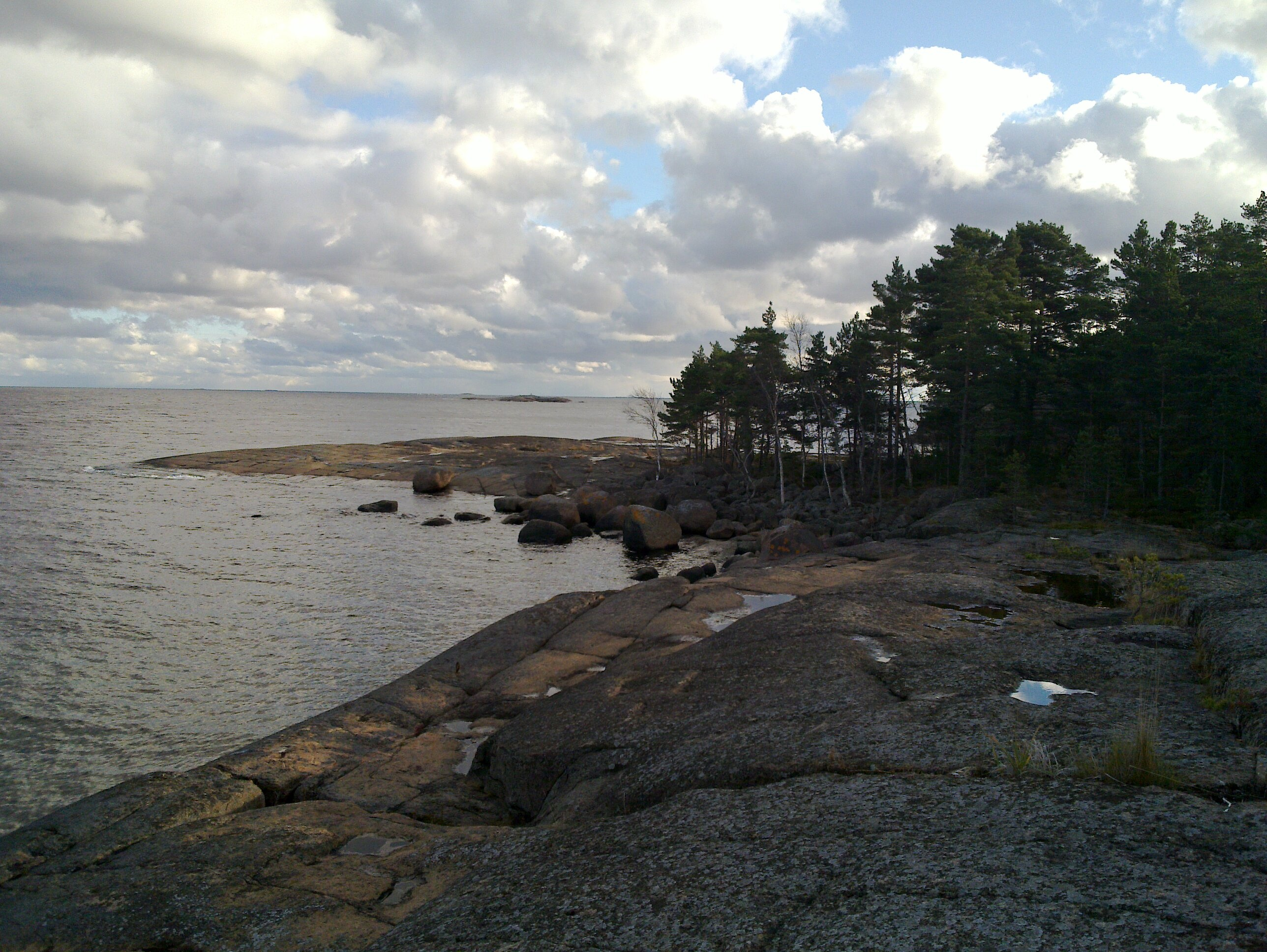
- Island Ulko-Tammio in Hamina

- Location within Finland
- Location: Kymenlaakso, Finland
- Coordinates: 60°17′05″N 27°16′26″E
- Area: 6 km^{2} (2.3 sq mi)
- Established: 1982
- Visitors: 15,800 (in 2024)
- Governing body: Metsähallitus
- Website: https://www.luontoon.fi/en/destinations/gulf-of-finland-national-park

The Eastern Gulf of Finland National Park (Finnish: Itäisen Suomenlahden kansallispuisto, Swedish: Östra Finska vikens nationalpark) is a national park in the Kymenlaakso region of Finland. It was established in 1982 and has a total land area of 6.7 square kilometres (2.6 sq mi).

== Environment ==
The park consists only of small (under 1 square kilometre (0.4 sq mi)) islands and islets, some of which grow forest, mostly pine trees. Most of the islands are treeless rocks with sheer shores. Their sheerness is due to the rapakivi granite splitting in a sharply cubical manner.

The park is known for its aquatic bird fauna. The most common aquatic birds are the goosander and tufted duck. Other birds, including the razorbill and black guillemot, nest on the park's protected islands. It has been designated an Important Bird Area (IBA) by BirdLife International because it supports populations of many species of waterfowl on passage, as well as breeding gulls.

== See also ==
- List of national parks of Finland
- Protected areas of Finland
