= Torronsuo National Park =

National park in Kanta-Häme, Finland

- IUCN category II (national park)
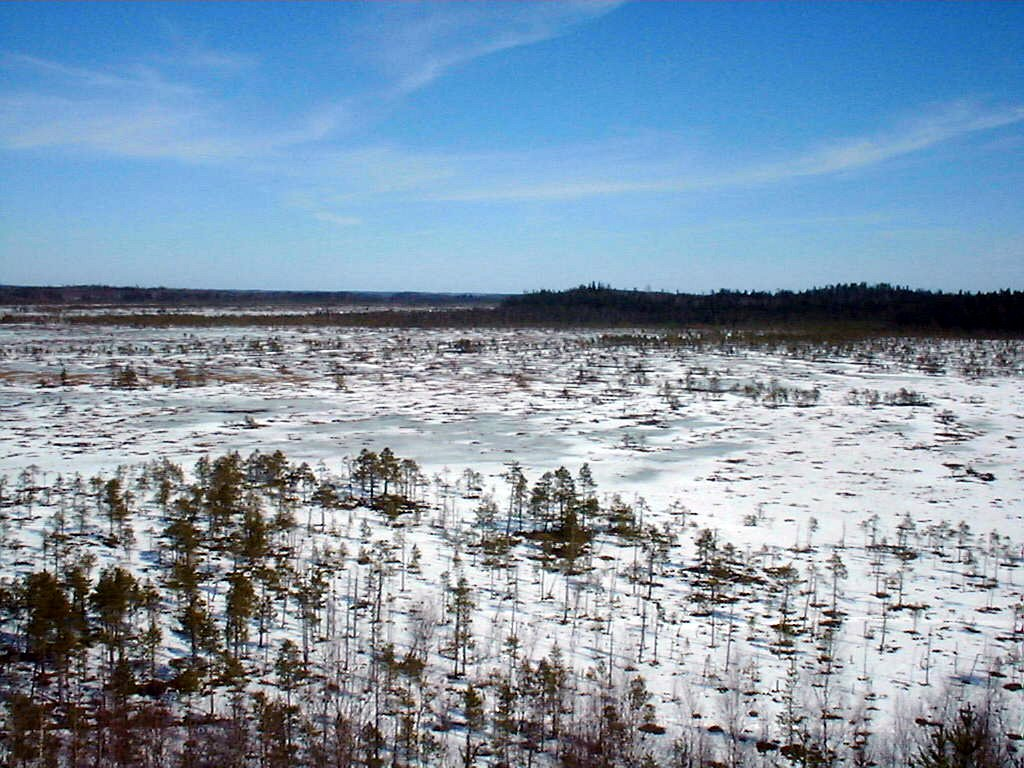
- Torronsuo National Park in spring 2005

- Location within Finland
- Location: Kanta-Häme, Finland
- Coordinates: 60°44′N 023°37′E
- Area: 25.5 km^{2} (9.8 sq mi)
- Established: 1990
- Visitors: 58,600 (in 2024)
- Governing body: Metsähallitus
- Website: https://www.luontoon.fi/en/destinations/torronsuo-national-park

Torronsuo National Park (Finnish: Torronsuon kansallispuisto) is a national park in the Kanta-Häme region of Finland. Even before its declaration as a national park in 1990, the near-natural state swamp area was a protected area. Its area is 25.5 square kilometres (9.85 sq mi).

The park area is a typical ombrotrophic raised bog – a thick turf layer with its middle part raising above its edges. The turf layer is one of the thickest measured among Finnish bogs, locally extending to 12 metres (39 ft).

Torronsuo is valuable for its birdlife and butterfly species. Roughly a hundred species nest in the area. Part of the birds and insects are species that typically live in the northern areas, and they aren't seen much elsewhere in southern Finland.

== See also ==
- List of national parks of Finland
- Protected areas of Finland
