= Ekenäs Archipelago National Park =

National park in Finland

- IUCN category II (national park)
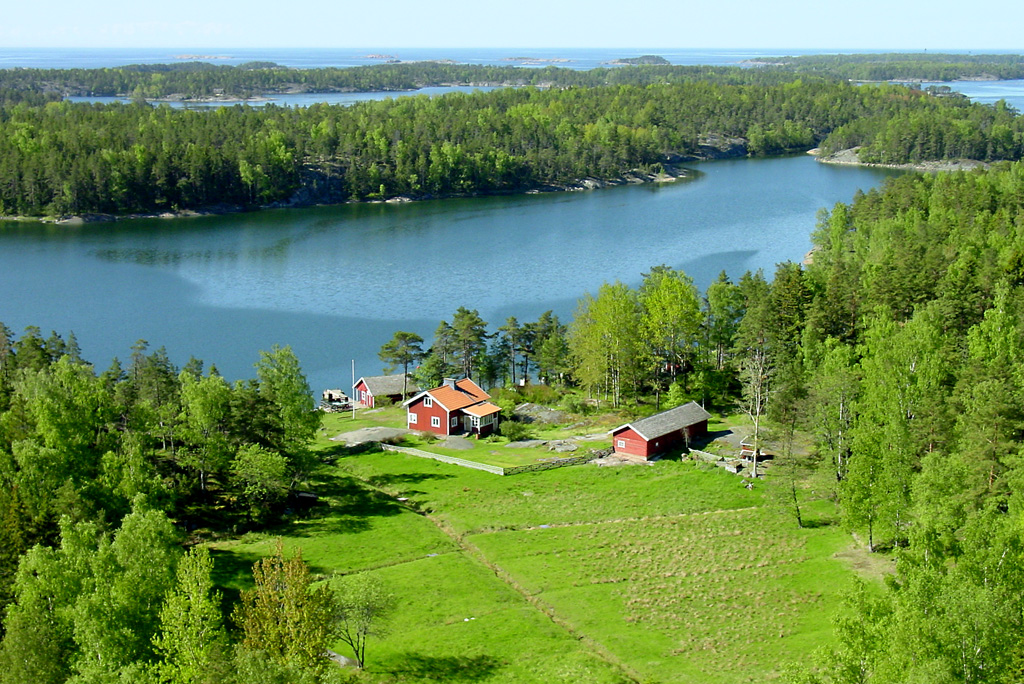
- Rödjan farmstead on Älgö island, the information centre of the national park

- Location within Finland
- Location: Uusimaa, Finland
- Coordinates: 59°49′22″N 23°27′15″E
- Area: 52 km^{2} (20 sq mi)
- Established: 1989
- Visitors: 53,600 (in 2024)
- Governing body: Metsähallitus
- Website: https://www.luontoon.fi/en/destinations/ekenas-archipelago-national-park

Ekenäs Archipelago National Park (Swedish: Ekenäs skärgårds nationalpark, Finnish: Tammisaaren saariston kansallispuisto) is situated in the Ekenäs archipelago, in the Uusimaa region of Finland. It was established in 1989 and covers 52 square kilometres (20 sq mi). The park is maintained by Metsähallitus (Ministry of Forestry).

Most of the park's area is composed of rock islets near the open sea, and the water areas surrounding them. Landing on and using motorboats near the most important bird islands is forbidden from April 1 to July 17, to protect the nesting of aquatic birds.

The park can only be accessed by boat. Visitors without a boat can reach it by a water taxi. In recent years, a scheduled ferry service has been introduced from Ekenäs harbour to Jussarö, one of the main islands of the park, during the summer season, providing easier access for those without their own boats. Jussarö also offers expanded visitor services, including small accommodation units and a cafe-restaurant.

Ekenäs Archipelago National Park received the European Diploma of Protected Areas on June 19, 1996. The diploma has since been renewed and is currently valid until June 19, 2031.

== See also ==
- List of national parks of Finland
- Protected areas of Finland
