= Kolovesi National Park =

National park in North Karelia and South Savo region in Finland

- IUCN category II (national park)
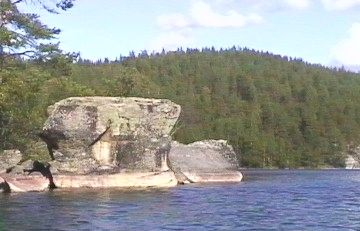

- Location within Finland
- Location: Etelä-Savo, Finland
- Coordinates: 62°15′27″N 28°49′00″E
- Area: 23 km^{2} (8.9 sq mi)
- Established: 1990
- Visitors: 17,200 (in 2024)
- Governing body: Metsähallitus
- Website: https://www.luontoon.fi/en/destinations/kolovesi-national-park

Kolovesi National Park (Finnish: Koloveden kansallispuisto) is a national park in the Etelä-Savo region of Finland. It was established in 1990 and covers 23 km^{2} (8.9 sq mi). It protects e.g. the habitat of the critically endangered Saimaa ringed seal. Typical of the rugged scenery of Kolovesi, formed by the ice age, are craggy cliffs rising from the water. Cave paintings have been discovered in the area. Motor boats are prohibited in the area. Kayaking, canoeing, and rowing and facilitated, and there are also several marked hiking paths in the area.

== See also ==
- List of national parks of Finland
- Protected areas of Finland
