= European Diploma of Protected Areas =

The European Diploma of Protected Areas, established in 1965 with Resolution (65)6, is a diploma awarded by the Council of Europe to protected areas (natural or semi-natural) of exceptional European conservational interest. It is a tool for implementing the European biodiversity strategy and is awarded for a five-year period at a time and is renewable. Over 60 areas in 23 states have received the award so far.

== Awarded areas ==
Armenia

- Khosrov Forest State Reserve

Austria

- Krimmler Wasserfälle
- Thayatal National Park
- Wachau

Belarus

- Berezinsky Nature Reserve

Belgium

- Hautes Fagnes

Czech Republic

- Biele Karpaty Protected Landscape Area
- Karlštejn National Nature Reserve
- Podyjí

Estonia

- Matsalu National Park

Finland

- Ekenäs Archipelago National Park
- Seitseminen National Park

France

- Camargue National Reserve
- Écrins National Park
- Mercantour National Park
- Port-Cros National Park
- Scandola Nature Reserve
- Vanoise National Park

Germany

- Bavarian Forest National Park
- Berchtesgaden National Park
- Lüneburg Heath Nature Reserve
- German-Luxembourg Nature Park
- Siebengebirge Nature Reserve
- Weltenburger Enge Nature Reserve
- Wollmatinger Ried Nature Reserve
- Wurzacher Ried Nature Reserve

Greece

- Cretan White Mountains National Park (Samaria)

Hungary

- Ipolytarnóc Nature Conservation Area
- Szenas Hills Protected Area
- Tihany peninsula

Italy

- Gran Paradiso National Park
- Maremma Nature Park
- Maritime Alps Nature Park
- Montecristo Island Nature Reserve
- Parco naturale di Migliarino, San Rossore, Massaciuccoli
- Parco Nazionale d'Abruzzo, Lazio e Molise
- Sasso Fratino Integral Nature Reserve

Luxemburg

- German-Luxembourg Nature Park

Netherlands

- De Boschplaat
- Weerribben
- Oostvaardersplassen
- Naardermeer

Poland

- Białowieża Forest
- Bieszczady National Park

Romania

- Danube Delta
- Piatra Craiului National Park
- Retezat National Park

Russia

- Oka National Biosphere Reserve
- Kostomuksha Strict Nature Reserve
- Teberda National Reserve
- Tsentralno-Chernozemny Biosphere Reserve

Slovakia

- Poloniny National Park
- Dobrocsky National Nature Reserve

Slovenia

- Triglav National Park

Spain

- Doñana National Park
- Ordesa y Monte Perdido National Park
- Teide

Sweden

- Muddus
- Sarek National Park
- Store Mosse National Park
- Bullerö Nature Reserve

Switzerland

- Swiss National Park

Turkey

- Kuşcenneti National Park

Ukraine

- Carpathian Biosphere Reserve

United Kingdom

- Peak District National Park
- Minsmere Nature Reserve
- Beinn Eighe National Nature Reserve
- Purbeck Heritage Coast
- Fair Isle National Scenic Area
