= Pilke House =

Coordinates: 66°30′40″N 025°43′53″E

Science Centre Pilke
- Tiedekeskus Pilke
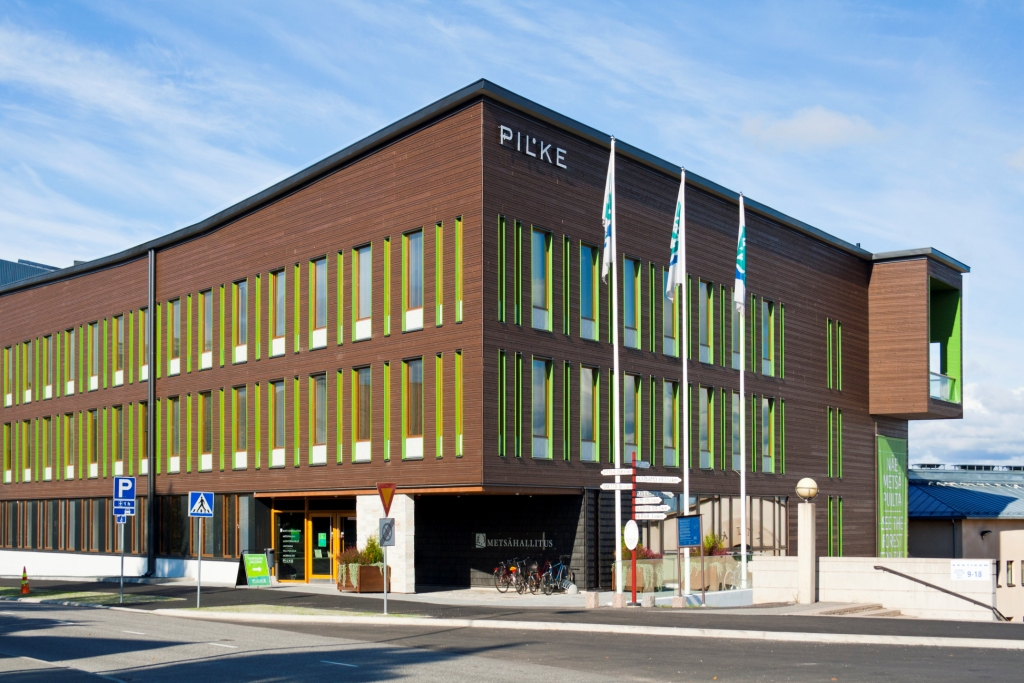
- Established: 2011
- Location: Rovaniemi, Finland
- Type: science centre
- Website: www.sciencecentre-pilke.fi

The Pilke House is a combined office building and science centre in Rovaniemi, Finland. It was built in 2011 and is notable for its low carbon footprint and the use of sustainable wood products in its design.

== Science Centre Pilke ==
Science Centre Pilke, opened in June 2011, has interactive exhibits, presentations and short tours, and is designed for people of all ages. The exhibition at the Science Centre focuses on the sustainable use of northern forests: the growth and management of forests and forest-based products and commodities.

== Office building ==
The Pilke House also houses the offices of Metsähallitus, the organization which manages Finland's 37 national parks, providing workspace for 135 people.

== Architecture ==
The building is a wooden beam-column structure, an example of ecological wood construction and Finnish architecture. The carbon dioxide emissions of the wooden Pilke House are about one third of those of a steel or concrete building of the same size. In 2011 Pilke House was presented with the Wooden Structure of the Year Award by the Puuinfo organization. The facade of the building consists of wooden bearing exterior wall blocks. The rooms and spaces inside the building can be altered and resized flexibly. The Pilke House is designed by the architectural studio Arkkitehtityöhuone Artto Palo Rossi Tikka Oy (APRT). The chief designer was Architect Teemu Palo; Juhani Suikki worked as the project's architect.

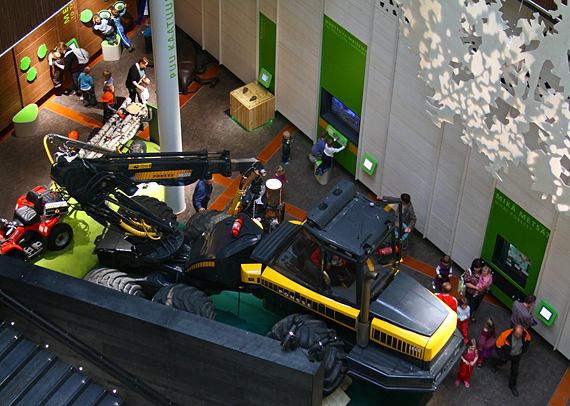
The exhibition of Science Centre Pilke
