= Salla National Park =

National park in Salla, Finland

- IUCN category II (national park)
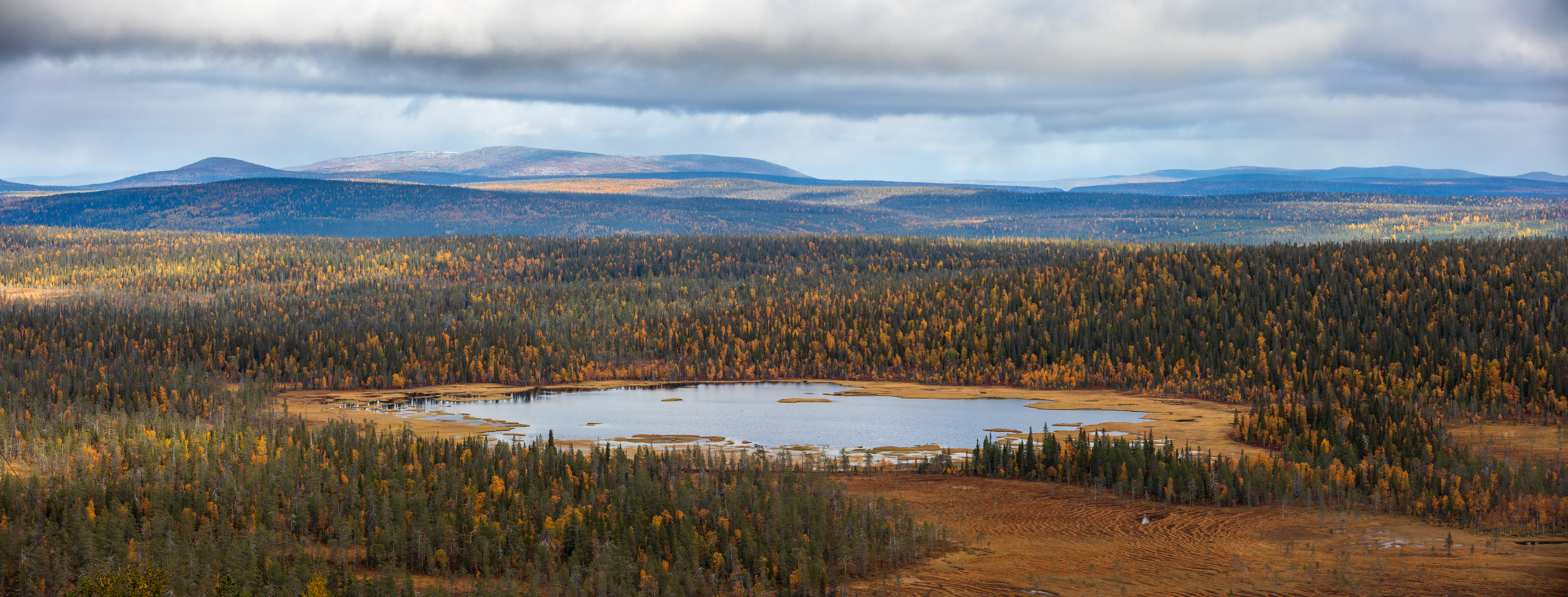
- View from Pyhätunturi East

- Location within Finland
- Location: Lapland
- Nearest city: Rovaniemi
- Coordinates: 66°48.055′N 28°51.401′E
- Area: 99.83 km^{2} (38.54 sq mi)
- Established: January 1, 2022
- Visitors: 55,900 (in 2024)
- Governing body: Metsähallitus
- Website: https://www.luontoon.fi/en/destinations/salla-national-park

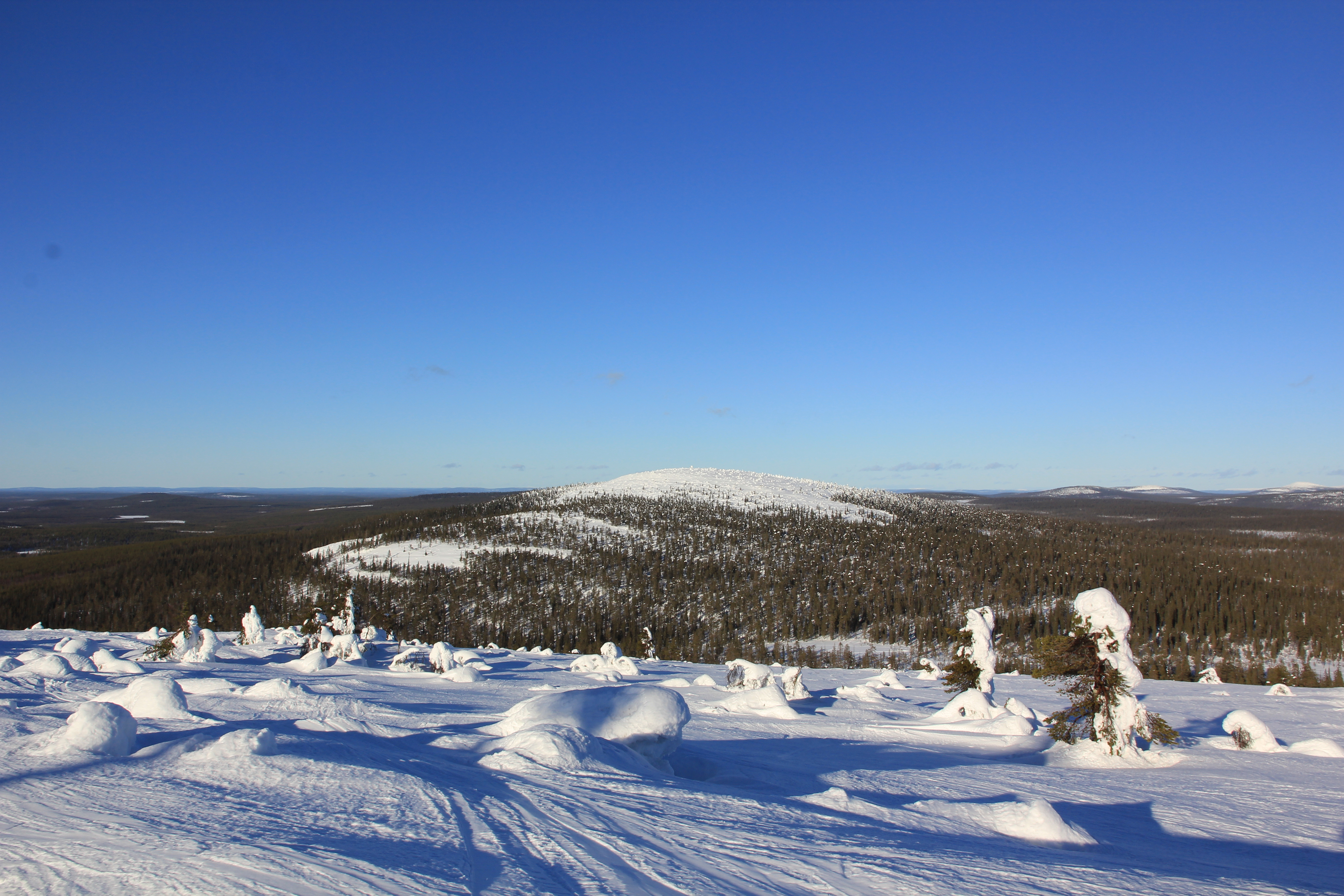
Higher peak of Sallatunturit

Salla National Park is a Finnish national park located in the municipality of Salla in the eastern region of Lapland. Established on January 1, 2022, it is Finland's newest and 41st national park and covers an area of 99.83 square kilometers.

The national park consists of very representative ancient forests and small bogs, as well as glacier-shaped hills and ridges. The western part of the national park is bordered by the tourist and ski center of Sallatunturi, and the eastern part by the Finnish-Russian border. The town of Salla is less than 10 km to the northwest.

Within a year of its opening, the National Park had seen an increase in local economic activity and investment, as well as calls for a rail connection to be extended to Salla from its current terminus in Kemijärvi, c. 50 kilometres (31 mi) away.

== History and establishment ==
Archaeological evidence indicates that people settled in the Salla uplands soon after the Ice Age, with Stone Age lakeshore sites such as Kenttälampi and rows of hunting pits still visible in the terrain. From at least the 16th century the area belonged to the Kuolajärvi Lapp village (siida) used by forest Sámi, whose seasonal land use combined fishing, hunting and early reindeer keeping; later Finnish settlement brought slash meadows and hay barns, remnants of which survive along streams and mires.

In the Winter War and Continuation War the Salla front saw sustained fighting; after the Moscow Peace Treaty Finland ceded large parts of "Old Salla" east of the new border, and wartime fortifications remain in the landscape.

In 1960 the Tuntsa wildfire, Finland’s largest recorded forest fire, burned roughly 20,000 hectares on both sides of the border, leaving long‑lasting ecological and visual traces on the northern Salla fells.

Most of the present park lies within the Aatsinki–Onkamo Natura 2000 site (SAC FI1301409), designated in 1998, and parts of the area were earlier identified in national mire and old‑growth forest protection programmes. The core of the future park was established as the state‑owned Sallatunturi nature reserve by Government Decree 646/2017.

Since establishment in 2022 the park has been managed by Metsähallitus. Visitor infrastructure has been upgraded in phases. Between 2022 and 2024 Metsähallitus completed metal stairs to the Kaunisharju viewpoint, an accessible rest spot at Kolmiloukkonen, a new wilderness hut at Pahaojankuru, a new lean-to ("laavu") at Pitkälampi, the Kylmähette bridge, stabilisation and stairs on the Iso Pyhätunturi summit routes, and a new link between the Itärinne and Tunturilampi laavus. The Salla Visitor Centre was extended in May 2023, and municipal construction around the centre in summer 2025 was announced. The park recorded approximately 62,200 visits in 2023.
