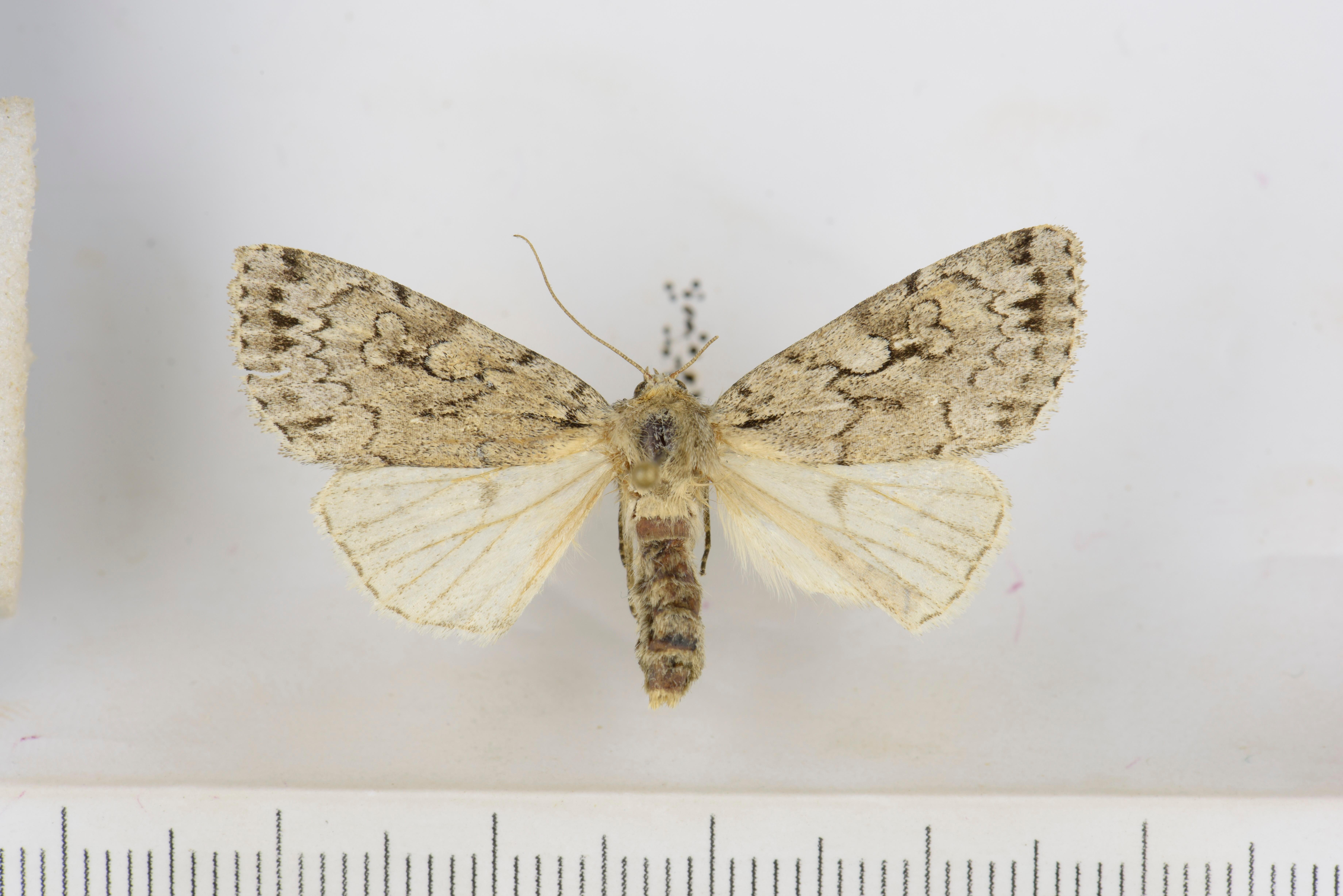

Scientific classification
- Domain: Eukaryota
- Kingdom: Animalia
- Phylum: Arthropoda
- Class: Insecta
- Order: Lepidoptera
- Superfamily: Noctuoidea
- Family: Noctuidae
- Genus: Xestia
- Species: X. sincera

Binomial name
- Xestia sincera (Herrich-Schäffer, 1851)

= Xestia sincera =

Species of moth

Xestia sincera is a moth in the family Noctuidae. Its wingspan is 36 to 39 millimetres (1.4 to 1.5 in), and it can be found in the Nordic countries.
