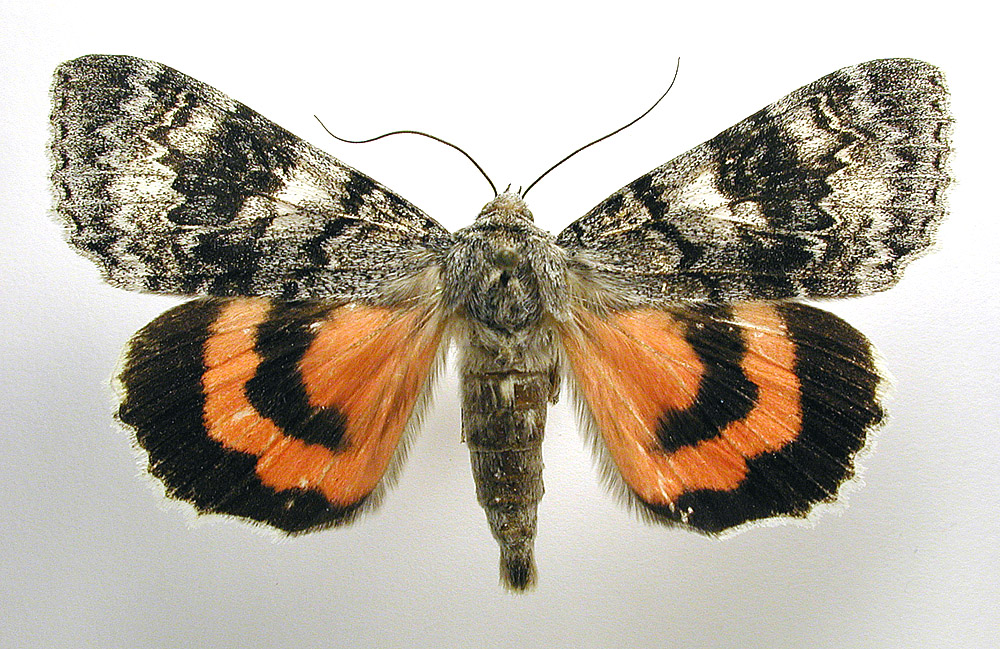

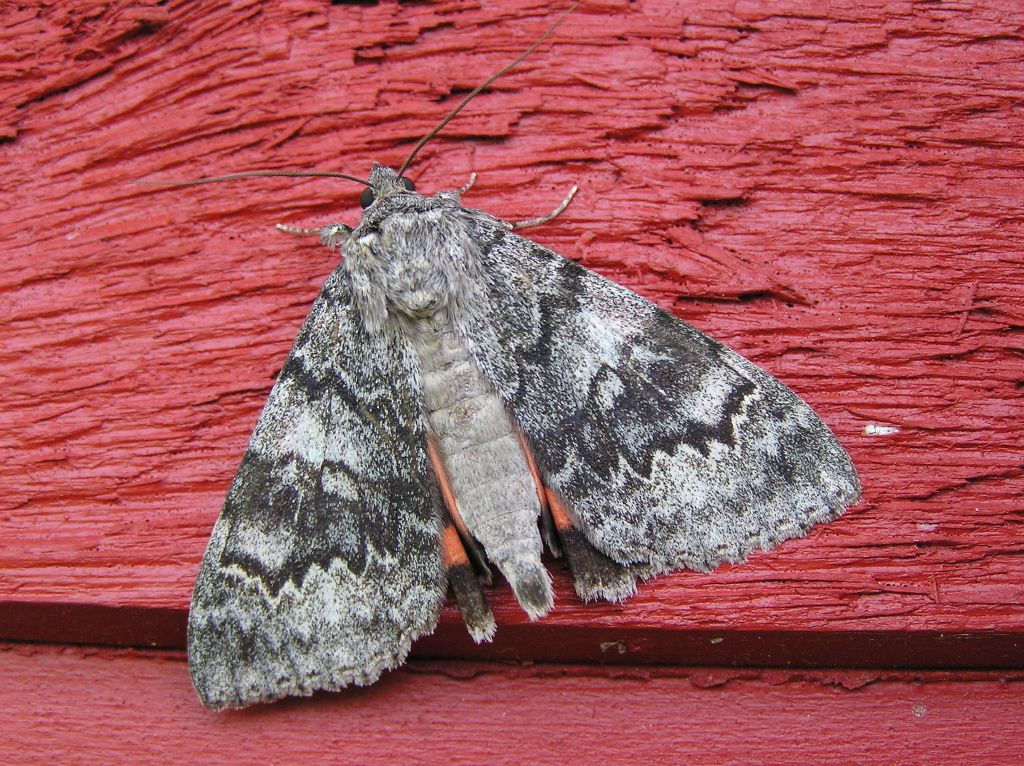

Scientific classification
- Kingdom: Animalia
- Phylum: Arthropoda
- Class: Insecta
- Order: Lepidoptera
- Superfamily: Noctuoidea
- Family: Erebidae
- Genus: Catocala
- Species: C. adultera

Binomial name
- Catocala adultera Ménétries, 1856

= Catocala adultera =

Species of moth

Catocala adultera is a moth in the family Erebidae first described by Édouard Ménétries in 1856. It is found in northern Europe, from Siberia to the Russian Far East (Altai, Ussuri, Amur) and Mongolia.

Its wingspan is 73 to 80 millimetres (2.9 to 3.1 in).

The larvae feed on Populus tremula.
