= Krimml Waterfalls =

Waterfall in Austria

Coordinates: 47°11′53″N 12°10′17″E

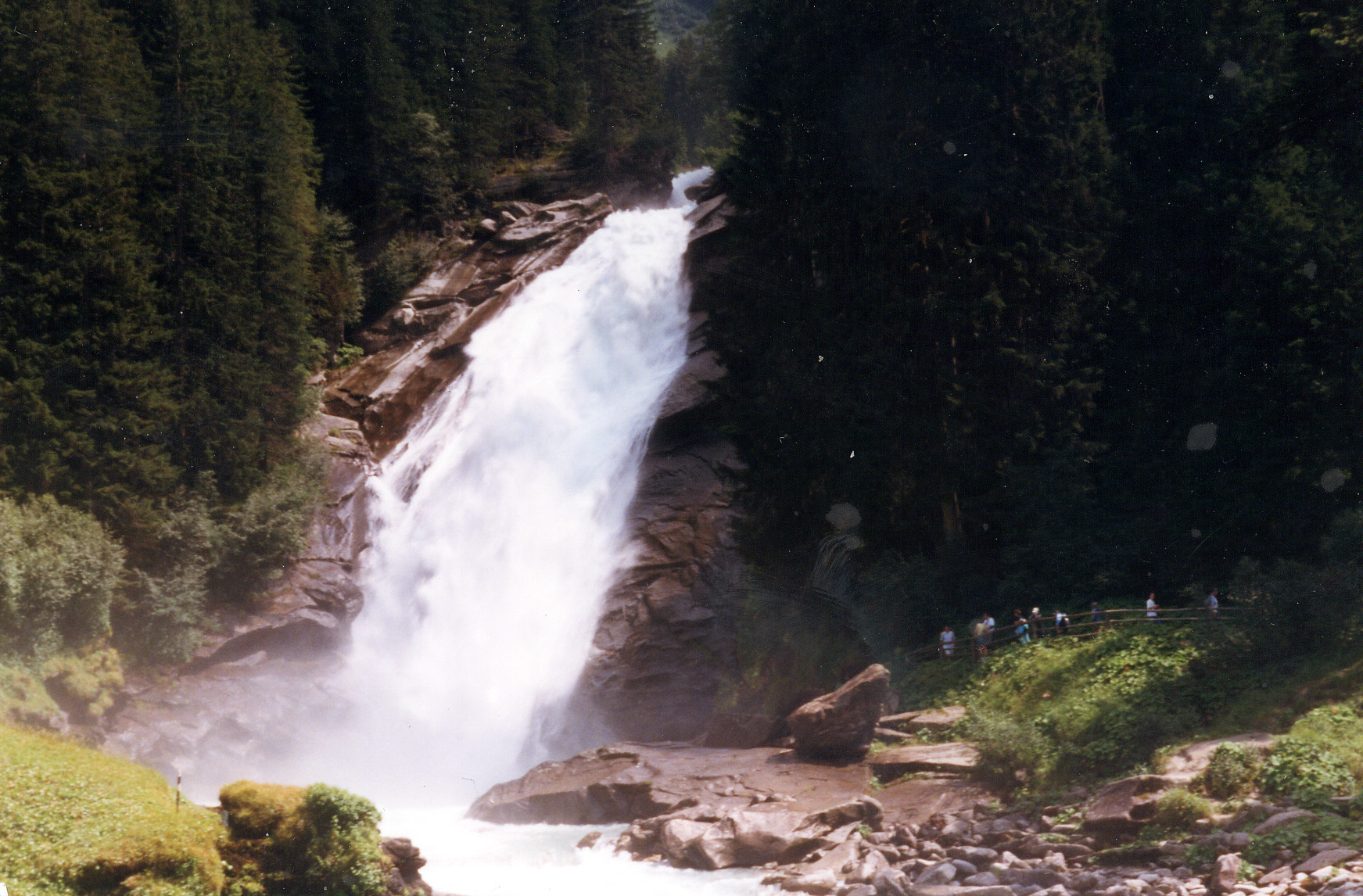
The lowest tier of the Krimml Waterfalls, Austria's highest waterfall.

The Krimml Waterfalls (German: Krimmler Wasserfälle), with a total height of 380 metres (1,247 feet), are the highest waterfall in Austria. The falls are on the Krimmler Ache river and are located near the village of Krimml in the High Tauern National Park in Salzburg state.

== Falls ==
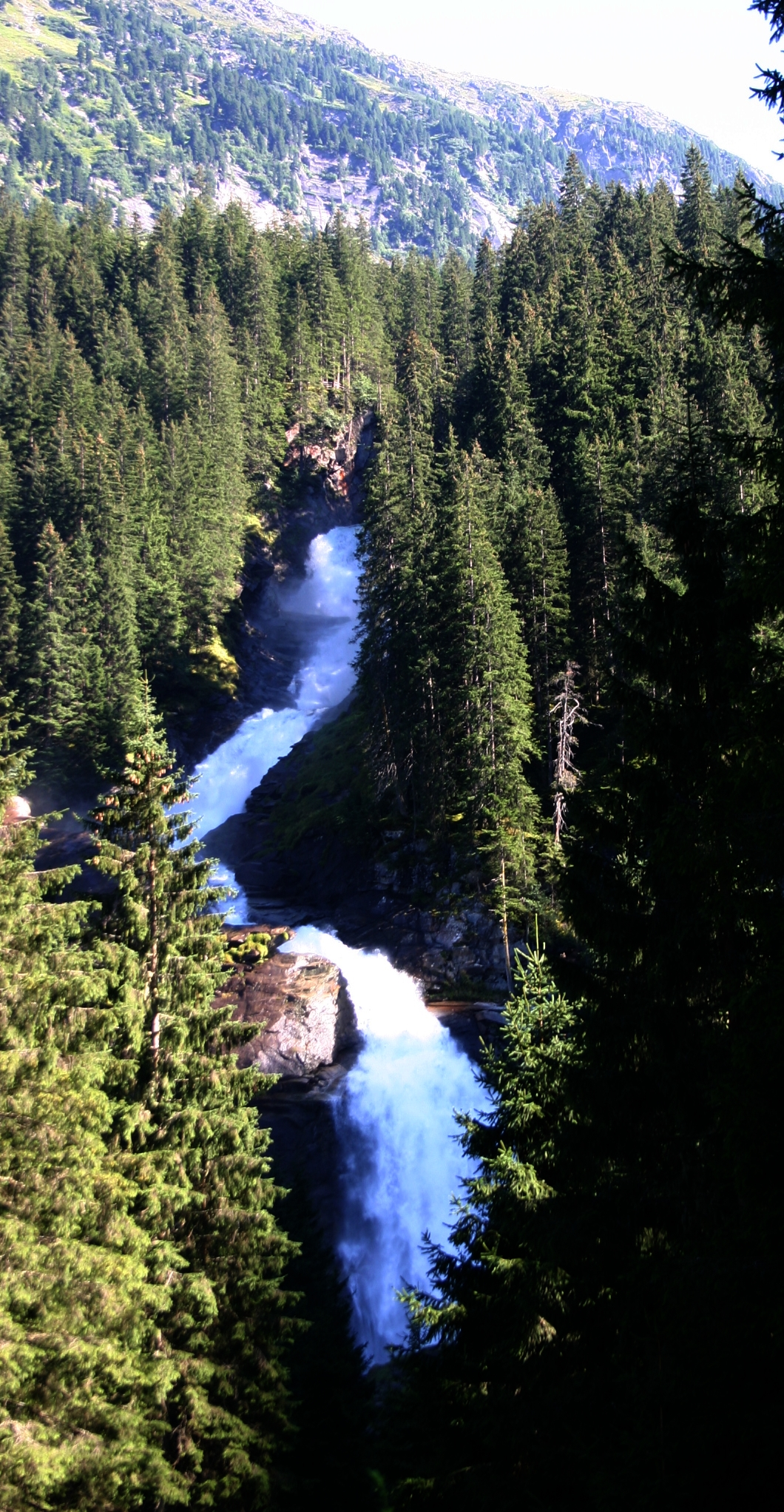
Part of the Krimml Waterfalls.

Krimmler Waterfalls is a tiered waterfall. The waterfall begins at the top of the Krimmler Ache valley, and plunges downward in three stages. The upper stage has a drop of 140 metres (460 ft), the middle of 100 metres (330 ft), and the lowest a drop of 140 metres (460 ft). The highest point of the waterfall is 1,470 metres (4,823 ft) above sea level.

== Flow ==
The Krimmler Ache is a glacial stream whose flow varies greatly with season. Its volumetric flow in June and July is 5.6 cubic metres per second (1,500 USgal/s), while in February it is only 0.14 cubic metres per second (37 USgal/s). The greatest measured flow was on 25 August 1987, when it was 166.7 cubic metres per second (44,000 USgal/s).

After the falls, the river joins the Salzach, which flows to the Inn, then into the River Danube and finally to the Black Sea.

== Tourism ==
To ensure that tourists could see more of the waterfall without difficulty, Ignaz von Kürsinger, from Mittersill, created a path to the upper part of the waterfall. In 1879, the Austrian Alpine Club improved the road to provide a more panoramic view. About 400,000 people visit the falls annually. The misty spray of the waterfall creates ideal growth condition for hundreds of mosses, lichens and ferns. The surroundings are the habitat for 62 bird species.

There is a negative impact on the local residents due to the high traffic level in a small village, and because of erosion to the road.

== See also ==
- List of waterfalls

== Information ==
- Slupetzky, Heinz and Johannes Wiesenegger. 1993. Vom Schnee, Eis, Schmelzwasser und Regen zum Gletscherbach – Hydrologie der Krimmler Ache In: Krimmler Wasserfälle, Festschrift 25 Jahre Europäisches Naturschutzdiplom 1967-1992, Innsbruck Austria. ["From snow, ice, melt-water and rain to glacial stream - Hydrology of the Krimmler Ache"]
- Stocker, Erich. 1993. Zur Geomorphologie der Krimmler Wasserfälle In: Krimmler Wasserfälle, Festschrift 25 Jahre Europäisches Naturschutzdiplom 1967-1992, Innsbruck Austria. ["On the geomorphology of the Krimmler Wasserfälle"]
