= Suomenselkä =

Drainage divide in Finland

Coordinates: 63.0°N 24.5°E

Finland divided by landscape features

Suomenselkä (Finnish pronunciation: [ˈsuo̯menˌselkæ]) is a drainage divide in western Finland. Roughly 500 kilometres (310 mi) long and 30–50 kilometres (19–31 mi) wide, it is marked by an ensemble of northeast–southwest oriented moraines parallel to the Bothnian coastline. Rivers flowing west from Suomenselkä drain to the Gulf of Bothnia and the lakes in the east drain to the Gulf of Finland. Geographically, the area is relatively flat, with highest altitude variations being 20 m. Because of the low relief, there are bifurcation lakes. Historically, this very sparsely populated region separated Ostrobothnia from the southern and eastern lake regions of Finland. The landscape is marked by moraines, eskers, bogs and forests and is difficult to cultivate or settle in. Most of the forests are pine barrens, where the main species is Scots pine (Pinus sylvestris). Large bogs are common. Because it contains some of the few remaining patches of old-growth forest in southern Finland, it is one of the few remaining habitats for Finnish Forest Reindeer (Rangifer tarandus fennica). Suomenselkä is often called Lapin sormi ("a finger of Lapland"), because it extends Lapland's high snowfall and poor plant growth far south into Finland.
