= Metsähallitus =

State-owned enterprise in Finland

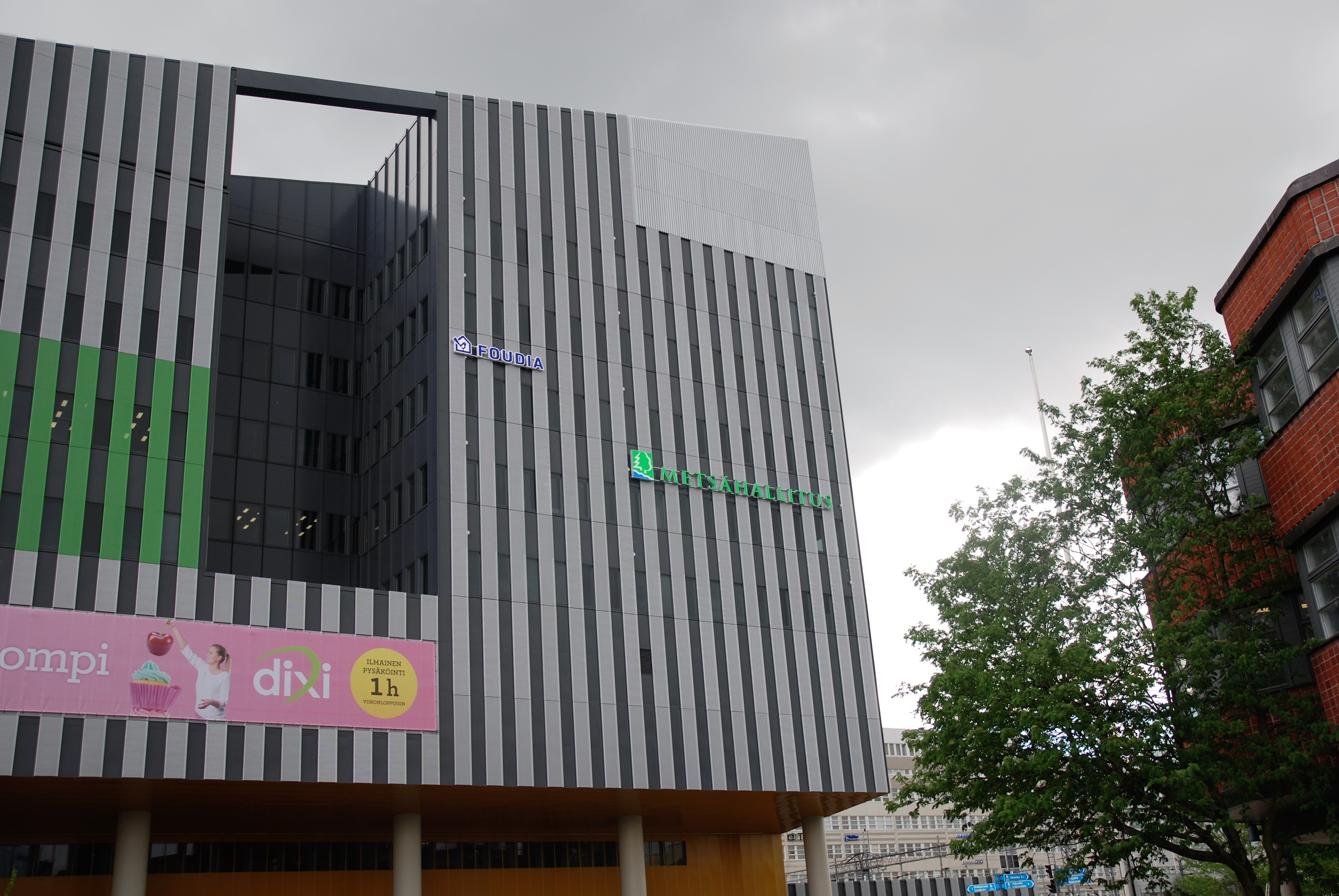
The headquarters of Metsähallitus in Tikkurila's shopping center Dixi

Metsähallitus (Swedish: Forststyrelsen, Northern Sami: Meahciráđđehus, "the (Finnish) Forest Administration") is a state-owned enterprise in Finland.

Its two main tasks are Parks & Wildlife Finland to manage most of the protected areas of Finland and Forestry to supply wood to the country's forest industry. Metsähallitus employs approximately 1,200 people. The company administers some 120,000 square kilometres (46,000 sq mi) of state-owned land and water areas, which is about 35% of Finland's total surface area. Its tasks are divided into business activities and public administration duties. Separate business units have been established for different activities.

== Organization ==
=== Metsähallitus Forestry Ltd ===
- produces about 85 percent of Metsähallitus's revenues
- markets and sells timber, manages commercial forests
- customers include the forest industry and other Finnish and foreign companies that use timber as raw material
- forest management is based on the sustainable use of natural resources
- the objective is to encourage a varied use of forest resources

=== Parks and Wildlife Finland ===
Parks and Wildlife Finland consists of the units National Parks Finland and Wildlife Services Finland, which provide the public administration services of Metsähallitus.

Metsähallitus’ public administration duties involve, among others, managing nature conservation and hiking areas, promoting conservation and recreational use of State lands and waters and controlling hunting and fishing rights.

- management of statutory protected areas and other areas reserved for conservation
- protection and care of endangered species
- management of wilderness areas, recreational areas and other special areas
- free-of-charge hiking services for the public
- customer services for Metsähallitus as a whole
- public authority issues relating to nature protection
- game and fisheries supervision
- game, fisheries and off-road traffic permits
- forest tree seed acquisition and security storage
- duties related to floating

=== Metsähallitus Property Development ===
- specialises in plot and forest real estate business and provides rental accommodations.
- prepares area plans, markets, sells and leases land for holiday homes
- is responsible for the acquisition and assignment of real property within Metsähallitus

=== MH-Kivi Oy ===
- leases soil extraction sites and sells soil.

=== Siemen Forelia Oy ===
- produces, markets and sells seed

== Key figures ==
	2017	2016
Turnover, EUR million	319	333.0
Operating profit, EUR million	117.2	103.3
Percentage of turnover, %	37	31
Result, EUR million	107.1	93.7
Contribution to state revenue, EUR million	93	96
Return on investment, %	4.2	3.8
Investment, % of turnover	5	4
Solvency ratio, %	97	97
Person-years	1,285	1,431

- Return on investment = 100 × operating profit/subscribed capital
- Solvency ratio = 100 × shareholders' equity/balance sheet total

Land area 91,320 square kilometres (35,260 sq mi), water areas 34,140 square kilometres (13,180 sq mi), in total 125,460 square kilometres (48,440 sq mi).

== History ==
In 1542 Gustav Vasa, the King of Sweden, which at that time also included Finland, proclaimed all uninhabited wilderness areas in his kingdom as belonging to God, the King and the Crown, thereby marking the beginning of state land ownership.

By the beginning of the 19th century, Finnish forests were already in full use. Until that time, forests were mainly used for slash-and-burn agriculture and to produce wood tar, an important export product in those days. Tar burning, however, began to dwindle in the beginning of the 19th century, while at the same time the needs of the sawmilling industry increased.

In the mid-19th century wood use was so widespread that officials were concerned about the disappearance of Finland's forests. In 1851 a strict forest law was passed, and a provisional national board for land surveying and forest management was established to monitor compliance and minister to the state's lands. The history of the national forest and park service, today's Metsähallitus, began in 1859 when Czar Alexander II signed a declaration on the founding of a forest management institution. Its area of operations covered state lands that were named crown parks, but monitoring private forestry, at least nominally, was also a part of the forest management institution's tasks.

The structure and tasks of Metsähallitus have changed over the years, along with many reforms in forest administration. By a 1921 decree, Metsähallitus was designated a central agency under the jurisdiction of the Ministry of Agriculture and Forestry, and was given the task of “managing, monitoring and promoting Finnish forestry”. That has remained a basic mission until today, although Metsähallitus’ responsibilities no longer extend to private forestry. Since 1983 Metsähallitus has managed nature conservation tasks under the guidance of the Ministry of the Environment.

Metsähallitus became a state enterprise in 1994, at which time many administrative tasks were completely excluded from Metsähallitus’ realm of activities. Along with the new enterprise, some of Metsähallitus’ business units branched out into their own brands, such as Wild North, which offers tourism and recreation services, and Laatumaa, which specialises in the land plot and forest real estate business.

=== Forestry ===
Metsähallitus has sold wood for different needs since the very beginning of its operations, for a while mainly at auction. In the beginning of the 1900s Metsähallitus sold, among other things, railway cross-ties and firewood to the national railway board, as well as timber to sawmills. Metsähallitus also established its own sawmills, which in 1932, however, were ceded to the forest company Veitsiluoto Oy, which the state had a majority holding in. The focus of the forest industry gradually switched from sawmilling to paper and board production, which, in turn, led to an increase in the use of pulpwood.

Before World War II forest management began to garner more and more attention. The regeneration of felling areas, initially through sowing and later by transplantation, became common in the early 1930s. The first mire drainings were carried out as early as the 1910s, in order to expand the area of productive forestland, and after the development of mechanical ditching methods in the 1960s and 1970s, mires were drained.

During World War II, Metsähallitus had the uncharacteristic task of producing, among other things, charcoal and chopped firewood for wood-gas modified vehicles. Following the war, extensive fellings were carried out on Metsähallitus’ lands in order to pay for war reparations as well as to remunerate the men returning from battle. A significant amount of Metsähallitus’ lands were also given up for resettlement purposes.

In the 1950s, fellings and transportation conditions were intensely developed, and as the demand for wood products grew, fellings reached even farther into the countryside. In the 1960s and 1970s wood production received a significant amount of attention, in addition to intensive soil cultivation, sapling stand improvement and fertilisation. At the same time, forestry was mechanised; trucks, forest tractors and chainsaws were taken into use. The 1980s saw the arrival of harvesters and various information systems used as forestry tools, which in the next decade became a part of everyday forestry operations. In 2003, harvesters were used in around 95 percent of fellings. With the increase in mechanisation, the tasks of foresters have broadened from carrying out fellings to conducting forest management work and different planning tasks.

Large-scale public debate about the state of forests and nature protection was sparked up in the 1980s, and fellings carried out in the wilderness areas of Kessi and Talaskangas led to conflict between conservationists and forest industry representatives. The predominant mindset of wood production did, indeed, change in the 1990s, focusing more on multiple objectives and the ecologically, socially and economically sustainable use of forests. With the help of, for example, Metsähallitus’ Environmental Guidelines to Practical Forest Management, the management of environmental matters became a part of everyday forestry. Metsähallitus’ environmental system based on the ISO 14001 standard was certified in 1998, and has further increased the monitoring and continuous development of activities. At the start of the 21st century, all of Metsähallitus' commercial forests were included in the PEFC forest certification scheme.

From 1997 to 2000, comprehensive natural resource plans, which are renewed regularly, were drawn up for all state-owned land and water areas. The participatory, co-operative and open practices that were drawn up at Metsähallitus in the 1990s are complied with in the natural resource planning process.

=== Nature conservation and recreational services ===
The first forests spared from fellings and the first ‘nature parks’ on Metsähallitus’ lands were established as early as in the beginning of the 1900s. These areas, among them the Pallas-Ounastunturi and Pyhähäkki areas, were preserved for research purposes as well as for posterity.

The first official record on establishing a national park can be found in a 1910 report of the Forest Conservation Commission. The first statutory national parks, however, were not formed until 1938. These parks, established in state lands, were defined under the administration of the Finnish Forest Research Institute (Metla). In 1956, seventeen national and nature parks were established in Metsähallitus’ lands. A second significant expansion to the conservation area network was carried out in 1982, when a total of 16 new national and nature parks were created. Metla's national parks and its strict nature reserves, excluding the Koli National Park and the Malla and Vesijako nature reserves, were transferred to the ownership of Metsähallitus in 1992.

Since the 1970s, the development of Finland's conservation area network has been based on conservation programmes aimed at preserving, for example, mires, herb-rich forests, old-growth forests and shore areas. A significant amount of the programme sites are located in areas owned by Metsähallitus. Metsähallitus currently administers a total of 480 statutory nature conservation areas covering a combined area of close to 15,000 km2. The wilderness areas of Lapland, which are of equal size, are also important in terms of nature conservation. Most of Metsähallitus’ conservation sites are a part of the EU's Natura 2000 network.

Hiking became so popular after World War II that campsites with campfires, firewood and latrines were a necessity. In the 1970s Metsähallitus focused special attention on expanding the existing network of wilderness huts. The first official hiking areas in accordance with Finland's Outdoor Recreation Act were established in 1979 in Kylmäluoma and Hossa. There are currently seven national hiking areas in the country.

The planning of national park management and utilisation began in 1974 with a national park working group set up by Metsähallitus. Building up of the service offering for hikers, such as routes, lean-tos and campfire sites, began in 1978 according to the first management and utilisation plans. National parks and a number of other nature conservation areas today offer hiking and recreational possibilities across the country.

For many years, Metsähallitus’ nature conservation tasks were handled as a part of forestry operations. Since the latter part of the 1970s, personnel specialised in nature conservation tasks have gradually increased, and the Nature Conservation Area office was established in 1981. Ten years later the office was changed to what is now called Natural Heritage Services. The Natural Heritage Services business unit, an ever-expanding field of activity, received its own regional organisation in 1992. Nature conservation tasks and hiking services have been developed to respond to the current conservation demands of nature's biodiversity, as well as to the needs of the recreational use of nature and nature tourism.

== Leadership ==
List of General Directors of Metsähallitus
Name	Term
Rabbe Zakarias Wrede	1863–1870
Jacob Henrik Alexander af Forselles	1870–1893
Carl Ernst Wrede	1893–1902
Peter Woldemar Hannikainen	1902–1918
A. K. Cajander	1918–1943
Mauno Pekkala	1943–1952
Nils Osara	1952–1960
Antero Piha	1960–1973
Paavo W. Jokinen	1973–1985
Jaakko Piironen	1986–1992
Pentti Takala	1992–2000
Jan Heino	2000–2006
Jyrki Kangas	2006–2014
Esa Härmälä	2014–2016
Pentti Hyttinen	2016–2019
Juha S. Niemelä	2019–

== See also ==
- Pilke House
- Environmental racism in Europe
