= Protected areas of Finland =

The protected areas of Finland include national parks, nature reserves and other areas, with a purpose of conserving areas of all of Finland's ecosystems and biotopes.

Protected areas include:

- National parks of Finland (Kansallispuisto/Nationalpark) – 8,170 km^{2}
- Strict nature reserves of Finland (Luonnonpuisto/Naturreservat) – 1,530 km^{2}
- Mire reserves of Finland (Soidensuojelualue/Myrskyddsområde) – 4,490 km^{2}
- Protected herb-rich forest areas (Lehtojensuojelualue/Lundskyddsområde) – 13 km^{2}
- Protected old-growth forest areas (Vanhat metsät/Gamla skogar) – 100 km^{2}
- Grey seal protection areas (Hylkeidensuojelualue/Sälskyddsområde) – 190 km^{2}
- Other protected areas on state-owned land – 468 km^{2}

The state-owned protected areas cover a total of 14,961 km^{2} while 1,220 km^{2} are on private land.

== See also ==
- Wilderness reserves of Finland
- Right of public access to the wilderness
- Natura 2000
