= Möhkö =

- Village
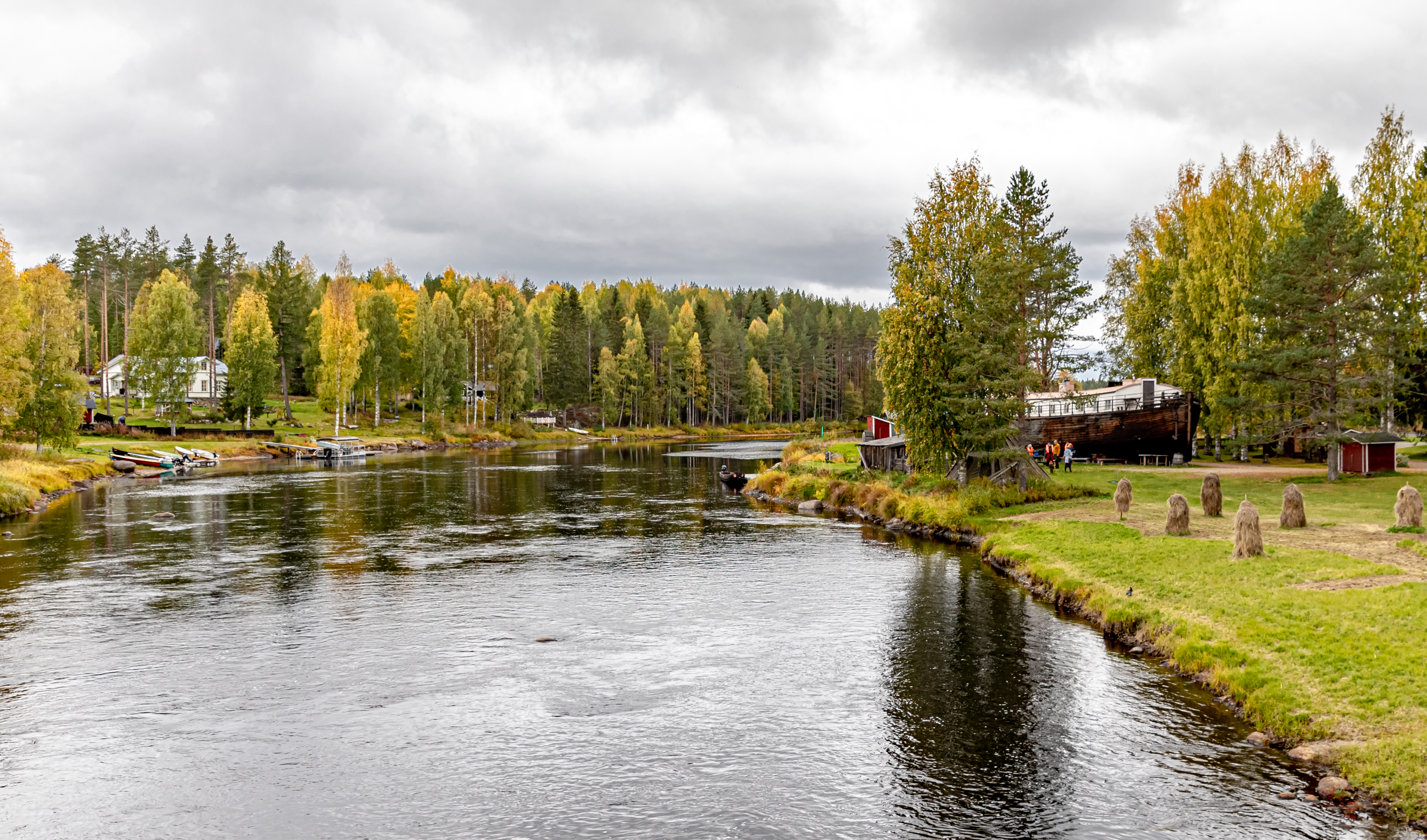
- Koitajoki flowing through Möhkö

- Location in Finland Möhkö (Finland)
- Coordinates: 62.641°N 31.286°E
- Country: Finland
- Region: North Karelia
- Sub-region: Joensuu sub-region
- Municipality: Ilomantsi

Population (2013)
  - Total: ~130
- Time zone: UTC+2 (EET)
  - Summer (DST): UTC+3 (EEST)

Möhkö is a village in Ilomantsi, Finland, located in the eastern part of the municipality along the river Koitajoki, near the border with Russia. As of 2013, it had a population of about 130.

The village developed in the 19th century around the Möhkö ironworks, established in 1849 and closed in 1907; at its peak, Möhkö had some 600 inhabitants. A sawmill established near the ironworks in 1871 remained active until 1960. Today, there is a museum in Möhkö showcasing the industrial history of the village.

== Geography ==
Möhkö is located in the eastern part of Ilomantsi near the border with Russia and along the river Koitajoki, which flows into lake Nuorajärvi near the village. The distance to central Ilomantsi is about 25 kilometers (16 mi), while that to the border zone is 1.5 kilometers (0.93 mi). The Petkeljärvi National Park is located near Möhkö, and the nearly 100-kilometer (62 mi) Susitaival trail also connects the village to the Patvinsuo National Park via the villages of Hattuvaara and Naarva.

== History ==
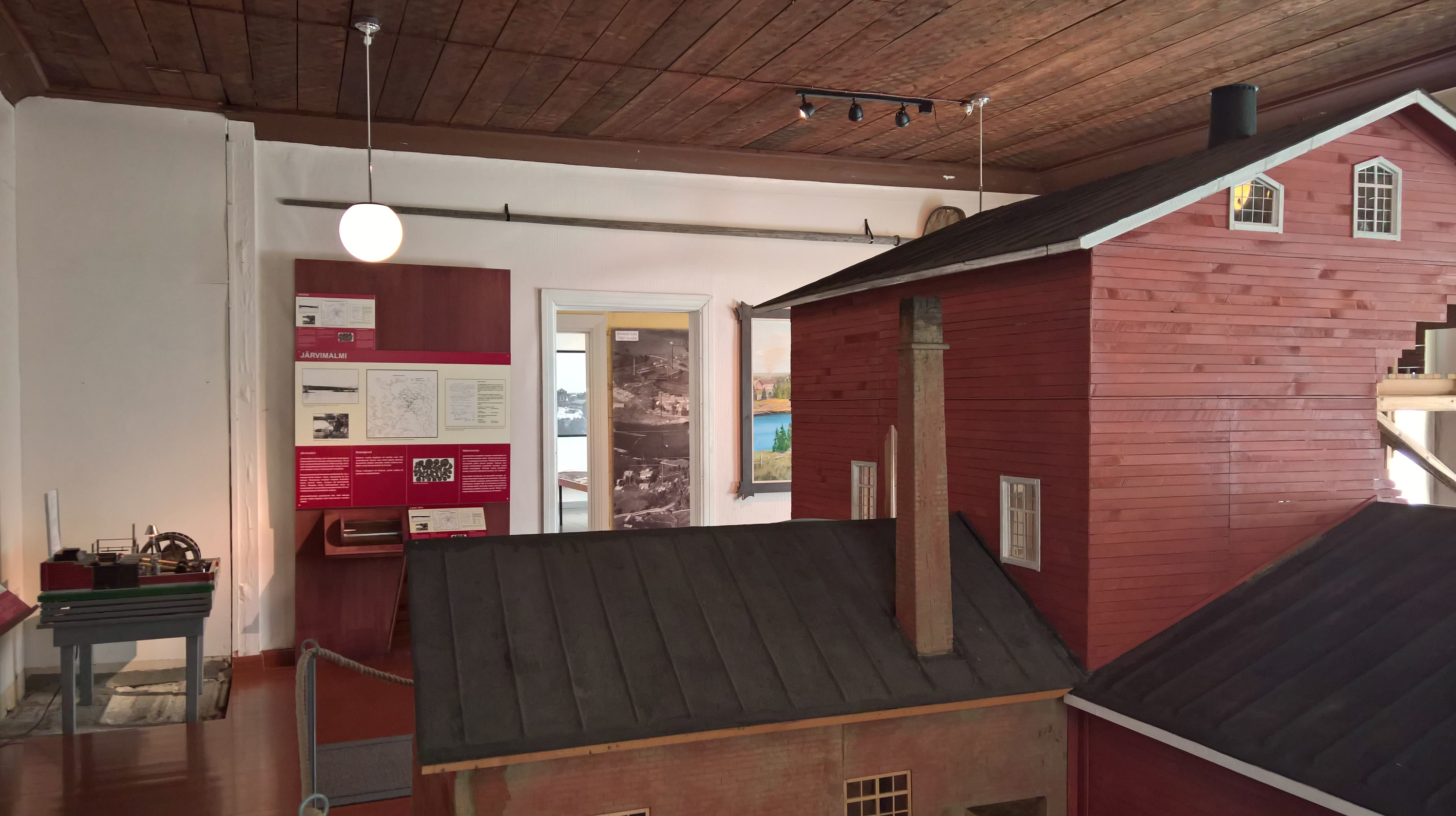
Model of the old ironworks in the museum

Möhkö was originally a section of the village of Nuorajärvi, which covered the shores of the eponymous lake. The names of Möhkö and the nearby hill Möhkönvaara are related to the word möhkäle (among other variants) meaning 'lump', in toponymy usually referring to a hill.

The Möhkö ironworks were established by Adolf von Rauch along the Möhkönkoski rapids in 1849. In 1851, the ironworks were bought and expanded by Nils Ludvig Arppe. Möhkö quickly became a center of industry and an important marketplace. The ironworks used bog iron extracted from the Ilajansuo bog and 61 different lakes, of which the most important was Koitere, supplying nearly 20 percent of all ore used between 1870 and 1881. The main fuel used was charcoal; about half of it was produced at the ironworks themselves, while the other half was produced by and bought from nearby farms. Pig iron produced in Möhkö was first transported to Karali by boat in the summer, and from there to Värtsilä by horse in the winter. From Värtsilä, the finished products were taken to Saint Petersburg to be stored and sold. A sawmill was also established in Möhkö in 1871.

By the beginning of the 20th century, the population of Möhkö had grown to 600. The ironworks were closed in 1907 and its lands were bought by W. Gutzeit & Co (a predecessor of Stora Enso). Since the 1910s, the sawmill was accompanied by a watermill, a planing mill and a generator. A tree nursery was also established in 1917. In the 1920s, the state expropriated some of the over 1,000 square kilometers (390 sq mi) of land in Ilomantsi owned by Gutzeit to be given to landless people on the basis of Lex Kallio. Small farms began to be established in Möhkö.

During the Winter War, Möhkö was under Soviet occupation from December 1939 until the end of the war in March 1940. In 1944, during the Continuation War, the Battle of Ilomantsi took place near Möhkö and Hattuvaara.

The sawmill was closed in 1960. The former industrial environment of Möhkö is today classified as a cultural heritage site of national significance (valtakunnallisesti merkittävä rakennettu kulttuuriympäristö).

== Economy and services ==
The main source of income in Möhkö today is tourism, centered around the village's industrial history and the nearby Petkeljärvi National Park. The village has a museum showcasing the ironworks, including some structures restored by the Finnish Heritage Agency between 1989 and 2006. Agriculture is no longer widely practiced.

The first school in all of Ilomantsi was established in Möhkö in 1858, originally for children of employees of the ironworks. Its main building was replaced in 1879 and the school was expanded in 1928. The school was closed in 1992 and its building was put for sale by the municipality in 2010.

Möhkö had its own bank from the 1920s until the 1950s.
