= Pielisensuu Church =

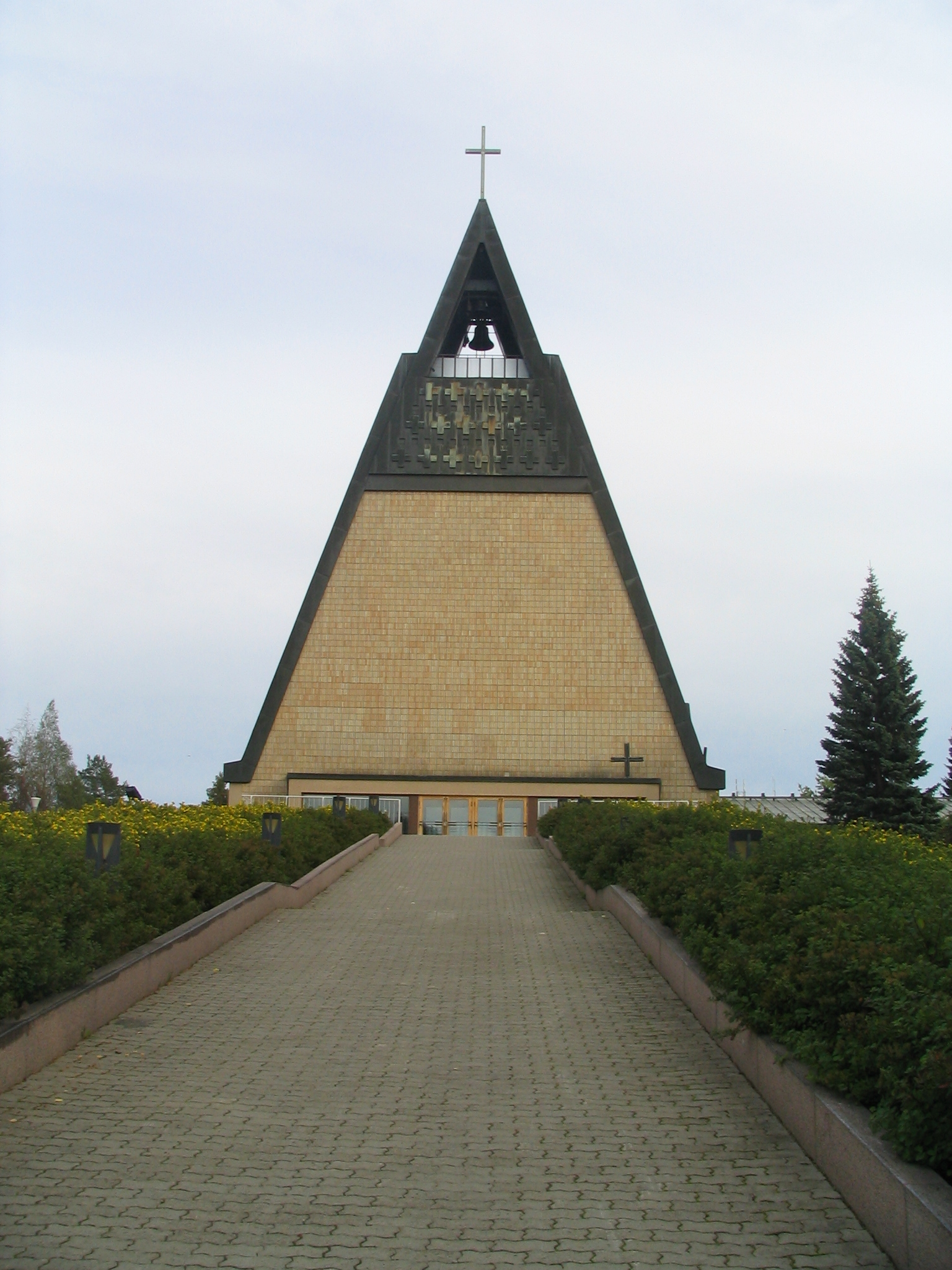
- Pielisensuu Church
- 62°35′36″N 29°46′54″E
- Location: Tikkamäentie 15, 80200 Joensuu, Finland
- Country: Finland
- Denomination: Lutheranism
- Website: www.joensuunevl.fi

History
- Founded: 1960

Architecture
- Functional status: Active
- Architect: Veikko Larkas
- Style: Modern
- Completed: 1960

Specifications
- Capacity: 550 congregants
- Height: 36 m (118 ft)

Administration
- Diocese: Diocese of Kuopio
- Parish: Pielisensuun seurakunta

Clergy
- Archbishop: Kari Mäkinen
- Bishop: Jari Jolkkonen
- Vicar: Tapani Nuutinen
- Dean: Ilpo Rannankari
- Pastor: Sami Hinkkanen

Pielisensuu Church is a Lutheran church in Joensuu, Finland. The church stands 105 metres above sea level on a hill in the Niinivaara neighbourhood.

== Building ==
The building was designed by architect Veikko Larkas (1909-1969), who also designed churches in Enontekiö, Kauhajoki and elsewhere. Construction of Pielisensuu Church was completed in 1960. The church is built in so-called tent style: a steeply-roofed, rectangular building of brick and concrete that stands 36 metres tall, with a small bell tower at the top.

The church sanctuary can accommodate 550 people, with 75 people in the organ gallery. A retractable folding door separates the main part of the church from a smaller parish hall, which can hold 150 people. The church also has club rooms, workers' housing and other facilities.

The church bells were removed from a church in Pälkjärvi, a Finnish-speaking part of Karelia which the Soviet Union had annexed in 1944. Pielisensuu Church was renovated in 1999, and work to expand the building began in autumn 2007. The new premises provide office space for church employees and more space for children and youth activities.

== Church decor ==
Artisan weaver and art instructor Dora Jung (1906-1980), a textile artist who specialized in linen and damask, designed the original altar cloths, which were woven by master weaver Marita Mattsson. The altarpiece features a cross and a mosaic wall.

Sculptor Eva Ryynänen carved the church pulpit. For the church's 20-year anniversary in 1980, artist Kaisa Mäkelä designed new altar cloths and clerical garb, including a red altar frontal featuring the 12 apostles.

== Sister churches ==
Pielisensuu Church has formal links with three sister Lutheran churches — in Mäntsälä, Finland, since 1978; in Tata, Hungary, since the 1980s; and in Schwarzenbach an der Saale in Germany, since 2005.

A charter tour group from Mäntsälä visited in 2006, a Pielisensuu group was hosted by Mäntsälä the following year, and the two churches held a joint autumn tour of Kilpisjärvi in 2008.

Similarly, a group of Hungarian pastors, led by Tata vicar Istvan Nagy, visited Finnish churches in Iisalmi in the company of Finnish pastors Samuli Ranta and Matti Sihvonen, the latter of whom was later to become a bishop.

The cooperation with the Bavarian town grew out of an earlier partnership between the YMCAs of Schwarzenbach and Joensuu as well as the friendship of verger Leo Piipponen with Günther Seuss. More than 30 members of a Pielisensuu youth group spent five days in Schwarzenbach in 1998; a school music class from Finland went there again in 2004.

== Gallery ==
Other views of Pielisensuu Church
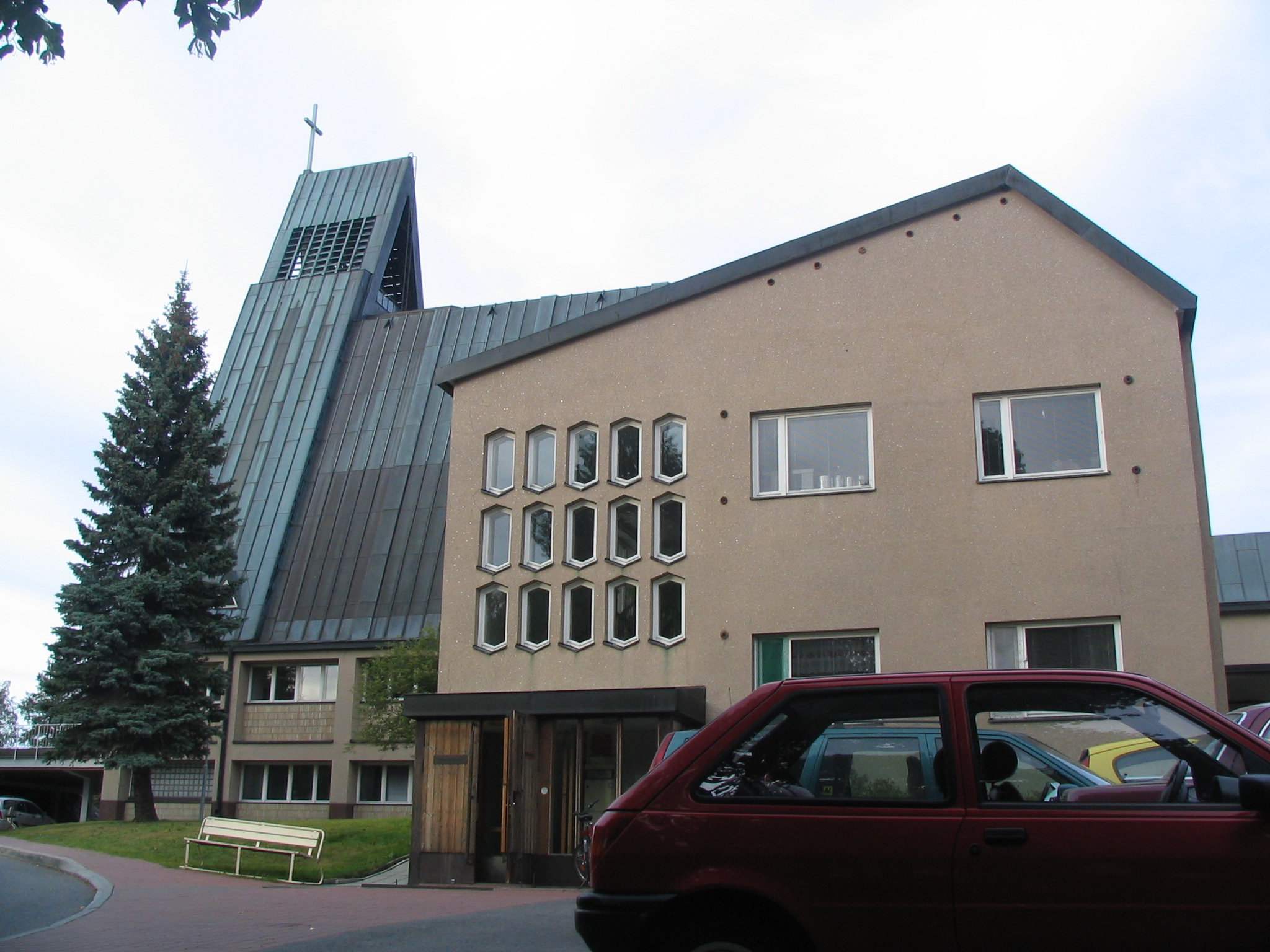
Westerly view of Pielisensuu Church.

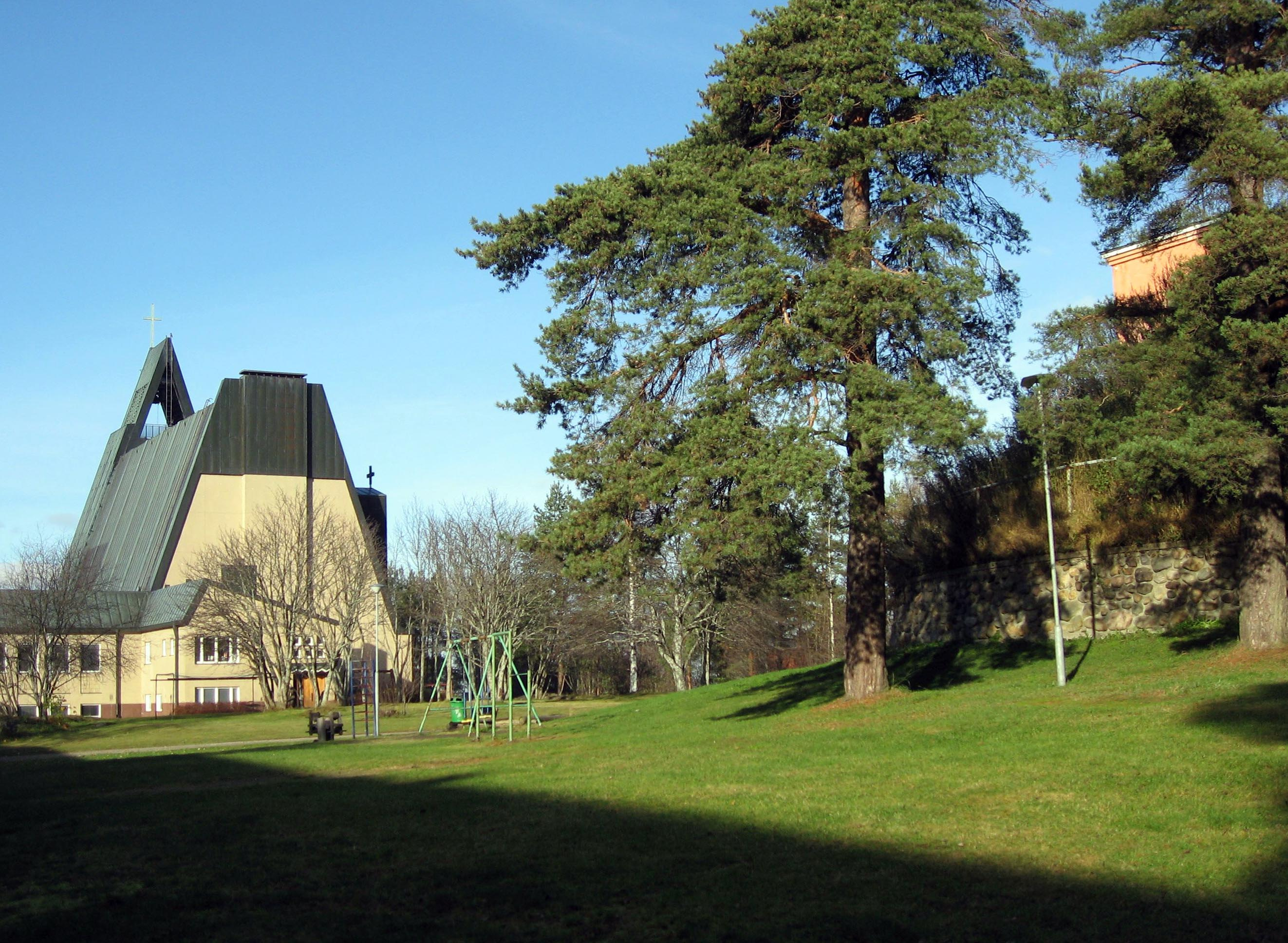
View from Water Tower park to the south.

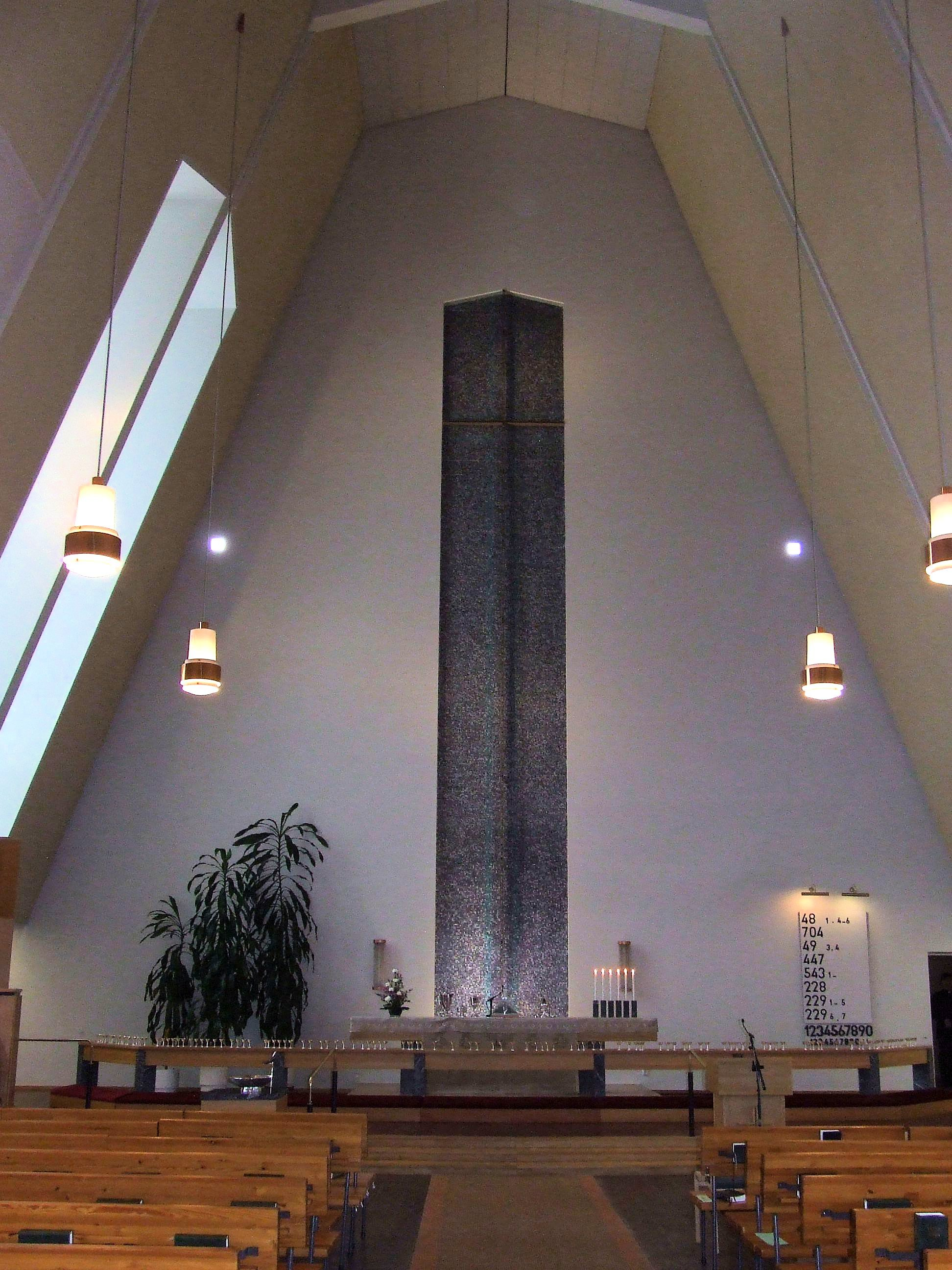
Interior of the church.
Sister Evangelical Lutheran churches in Finland and Germany
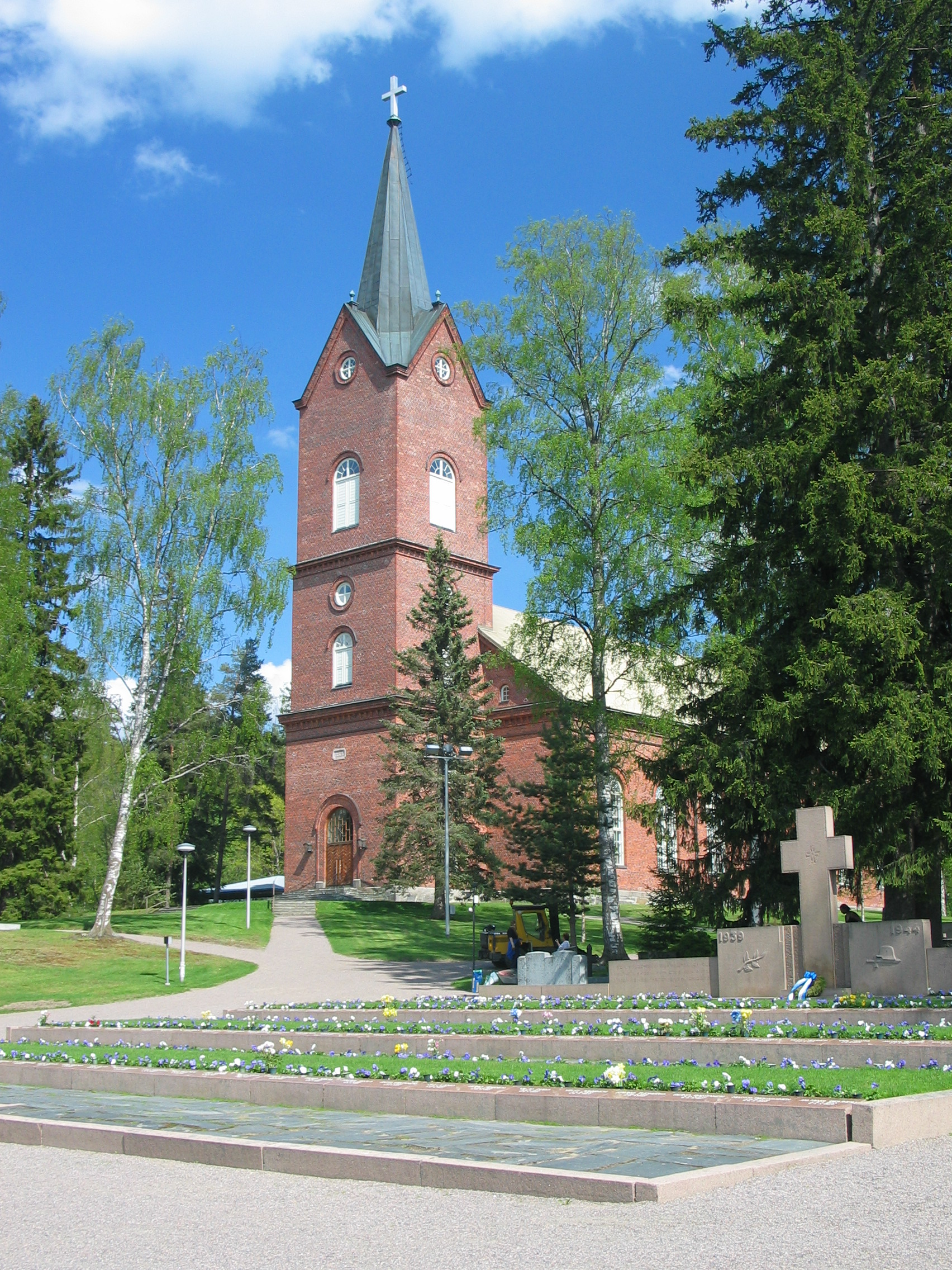
Sister church in Mäntsälä, Finland.

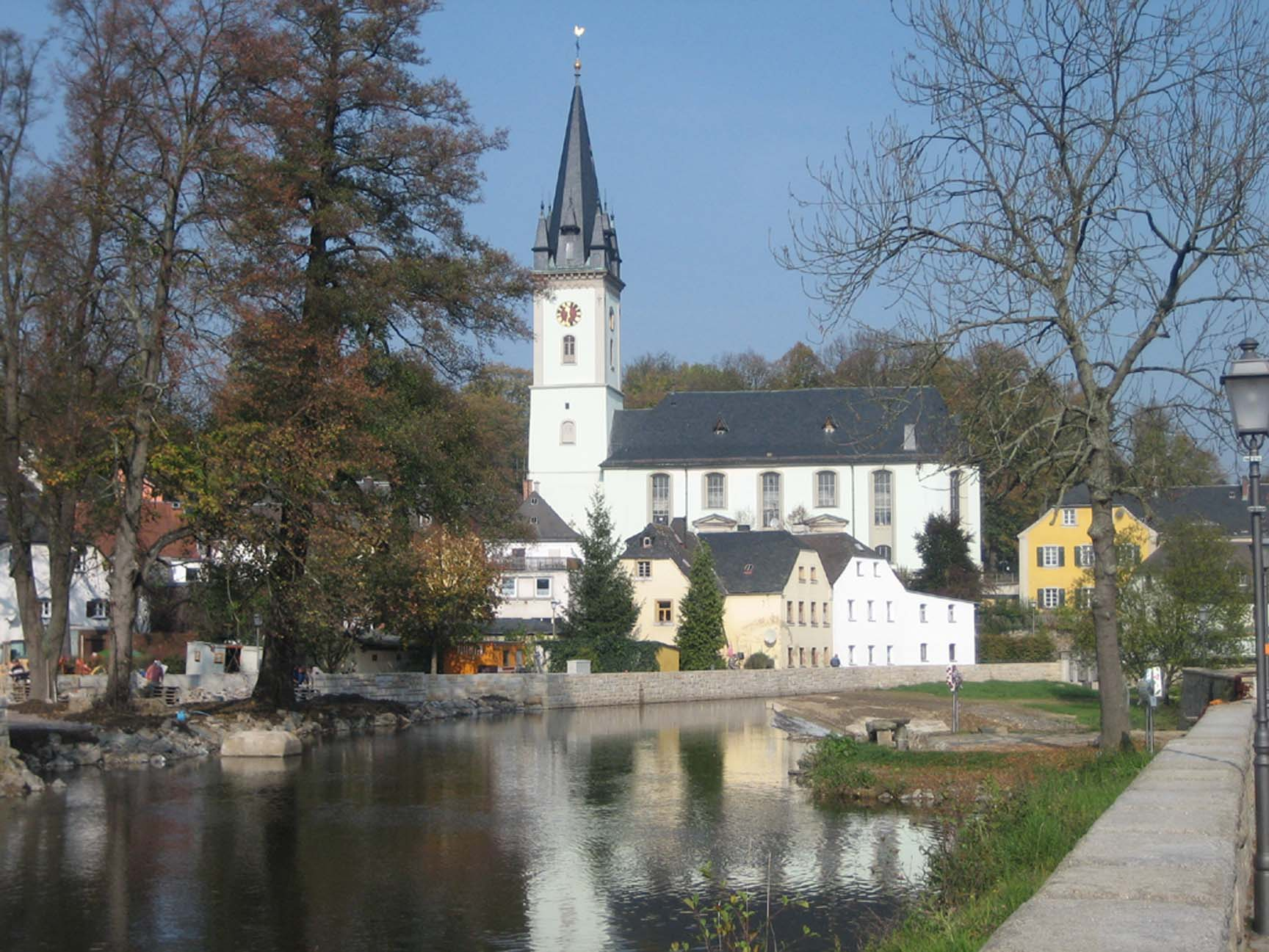
Church in Schwarzenbach, Germany.
