= Clerical collar =

Detachable collar worn by Christian clergy

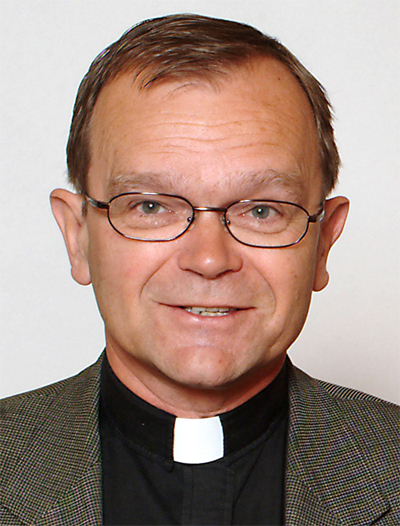
Church of Sweden Lutheran priest Sven-Erik Brodd wearing a clerical shirt with a "tab collar"

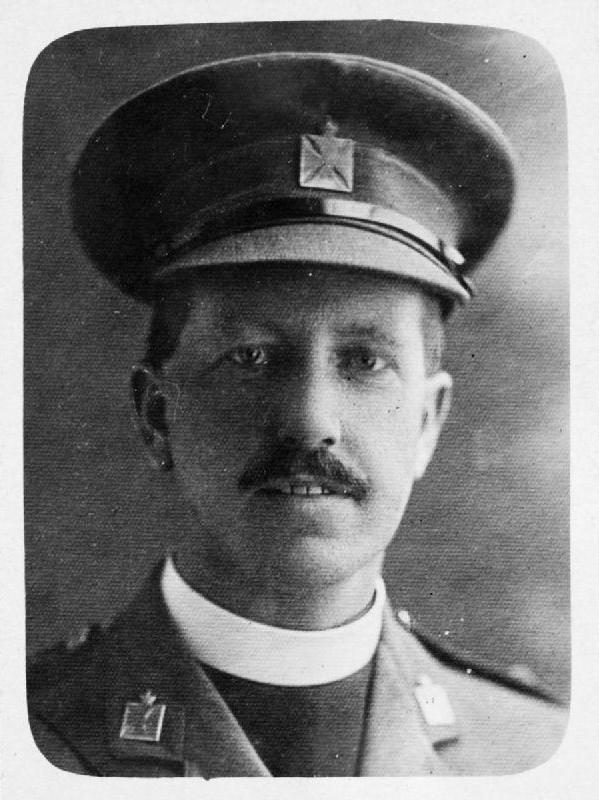
An Anglican military chaplain wearing a "dog collar" (full collar) during World War I

A clerical collar, Roman collar, clergy collar, or, informally, dog collar is an item of Christian clerical clothing.

== Overview ==
The clerical collar is almost always white and was originally made of cotton or linen but is now frequently made of plastic. There are various styles of clerical collar. The traditional full collar (the style informally described as a dog collar) is a ring that closes at the back of the neck, presenting a seamless front. It is often attached with a collaret or collarino that covers the white collar almost completely, except for a small white rectangle at the base of the throat, and sometimes with the top edge of the collar exposed to mimic the collar of a cassock. Alternatively, it may simply be a detachable tab of white in the front of the clerical shirt. The clerical shirt is traditionally black (or another color appropriate to a person's ministry rank, such as purple for Anglican bishops), but today is available in a variety of colors depending on the wearer's preference. When clergy are delivering sermons, they sometimes attach preaching bands to their clerical collar.

== History ==
According to the Church of England's Enquiry Centre (citing the Glasgow Herald of December 6, 1894), the detachable clerical collar was invented in 1865 by the Rev. Donald McLeod, a Church of Scotland (Presbyterian) minister in Glasgow.

By 1840, Anglican clergy developed a sense of separation between themselves and the secular world. One outward symbol of this was the adoption of distinctive clerical dress. This had started with the black coat and white necktie which had been worn for some decades. By the 1880s this had been transmuted into the clerical collar, which was worn almost constantly by the majority of clergy for the rest of the period.

Henry McCloud stated that the collar "was nothing else than the shirt collar turned down over the cleric's everyday common dress in compliance with a fashion that began toward the end of the sixteenth century. For when the laity began to turn down their collars, the clergy also took up the mode." Invented in the Presbyterian Church, the clerical collar was quickly adopted by other Christian denominations, including the Anglican Church, and subsequently by Methodist churches, Baptist churches, Catholic churches and the Lutheran churches. It was mandatory for U.S. Catholic priests starting in 1884. In the 1960s, many clergy who lived in countries where Catholicism was the dominant religion also began to wear the clerical collar rather than the soutane or cassock.

In the Reformed tradition, which stresses preaching as a central concern, pastors often don preaching tabs, which project from their clerical collar. Preaching bands (an alternative name for tabs) are also worn by Anglican clergy, particularly on occasions such as inductions when choir dress of cassock, surplice, preaching scarf and the academic hood pertaining to degree is worn, as well as at Mattins and Evensong. Methodist and Lutheran clergy also sometimes attach preaching bands to their clerical collars.

In the United Kingdom (and other British-influenced countries, such as Canada), full clerical collars have been informally referred to as "dog collars" since the mid-nineteenth century. The term Roman collar is equivalent to "clerical collar" and does not necessarily mean that the wearer is Roman Catholic.

In the late nineteenth century and early twentieth century, non-Christian clergy, such as some Jewish rabbis in England (such as Rabbi Abraham Cohen, the editor of the Soncino Books of the Bible) would also wear clerical collars.

During the 1950s the Reverend Alec Vidler began to advocate the abolition of the clerical collar in favour of a black shirt and white tie, but whilst some clergy adopted this mode of dress it did not become widespread.

Non-ordained church leaders are usually not entitled to use the traditional clerical collar with a different color than the clerical shirt, but some denominations are beginning to use the same design shirt and collar as ordained priests with matching clerical shirt and collar (i.e. black shirt with black collar, white shirt with white collar, purple shirt with purple collar).

== Use by denomination ==
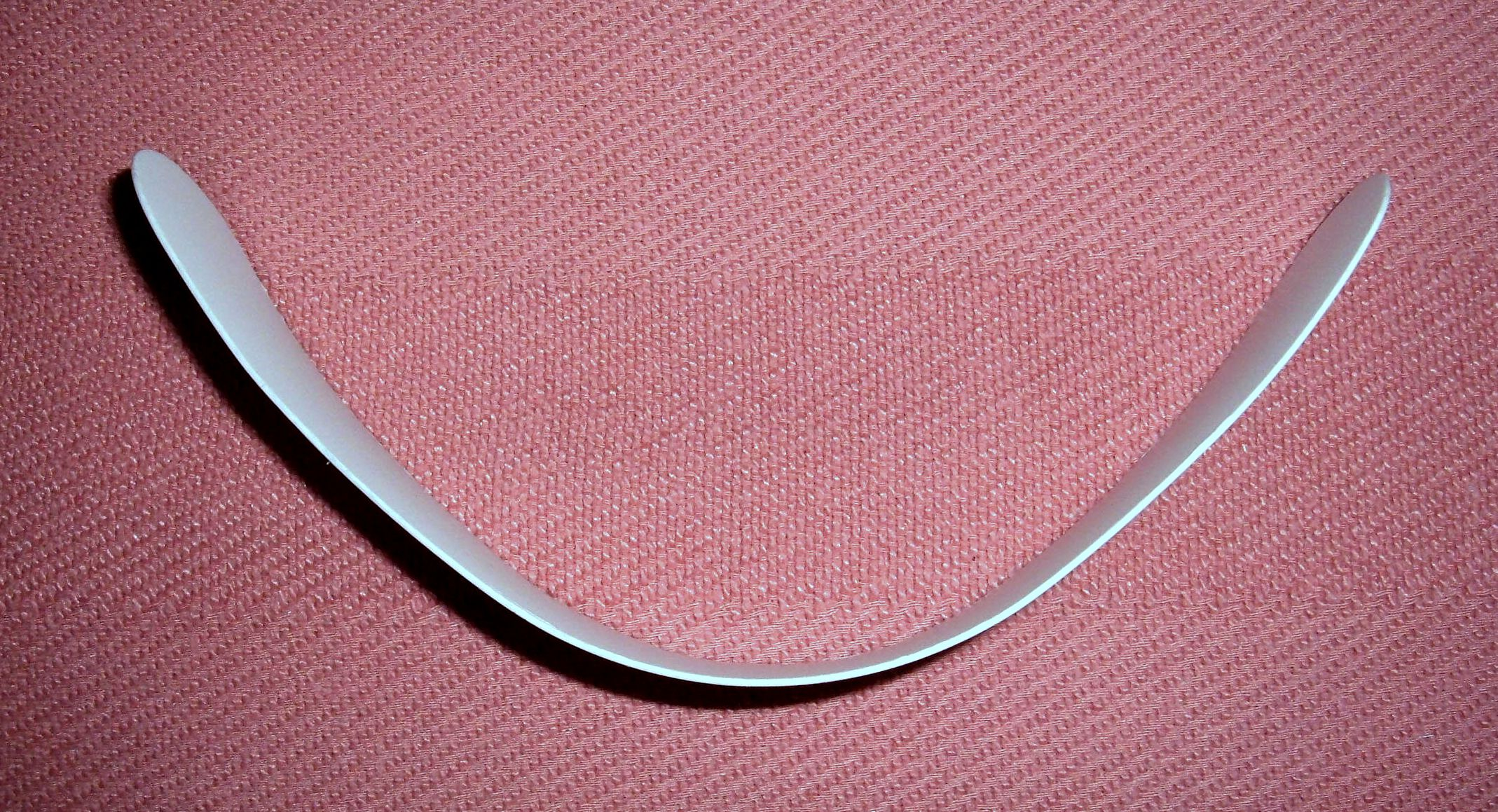
A plastic clerical collar

=== Catholicism ===
In the Catholic Church, the clerical collar is worn by all ranks of clergy, including the Pope, bishops, priests, and often deacons and seminarians. They also wear their cassock during liturgical celebrations.

=== Eastern Orthodox ===
Among the Eastern Catholic Churches and Eastern Orthodox Church a band collarette with no "notch" in front may be worn by seminarians, although the norm is still a standard clerical collar. However, as the cassock is more commonly, if not mandatorily, worn to classes, often a plain white shirt will suffice, or a band collar with no collarette. Slavic cassocks button to the side, and thus a collar is often pointless, whereas a Greek cassock buttons to the front and has a higher collar, so the collar prevents chafing—as was its original function under a cassock. Eastern deacons and sometimes subdeacons, but rarely readers or other minor clerics, also wear a clerical collar, with subdeacons and readers often having a style with no notch, or a tab shirt with no tab. Most Orthodox clerics do not wear a clerical collar; those who do are usually to be found in Western Europe or North America.

=== Anglican, Methodist, Presbyterian, Lutheran ===
Collars are typically worn by clergy of other groups such as those of the Anglican, Methodist, Presbyterian and Lutheran traditions, although many Danish and some Norwegian Lutheran clergy wear the ruff instead.

== Gallery ==
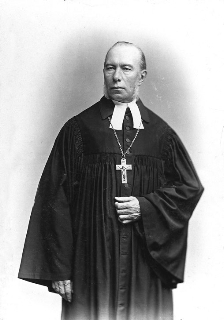
L. M. von Otto, a Lutheran pastor from Poland wearing an earlier style of clerical collar

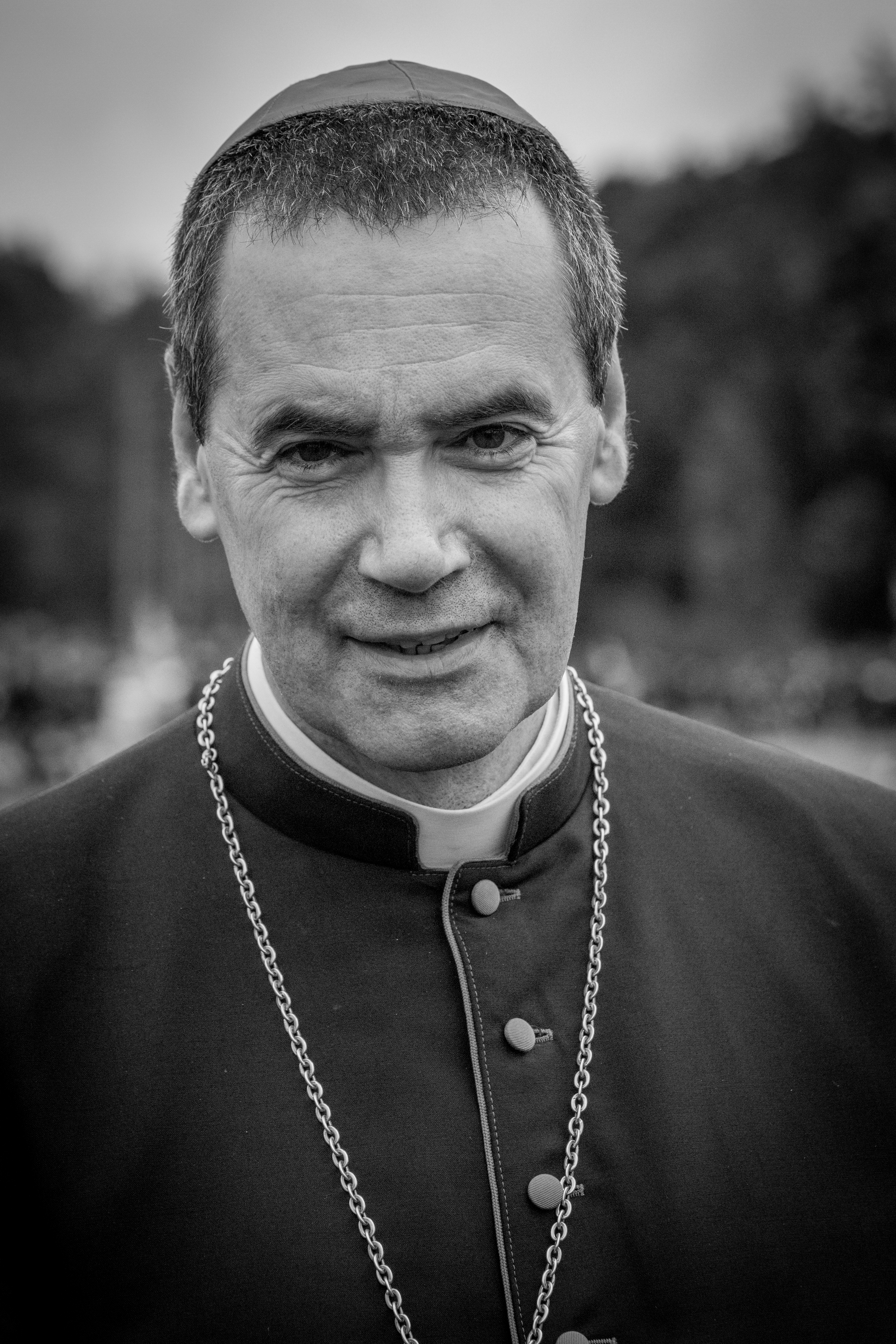
Jacques Habert, Roman Catholic bishop of Bayeux

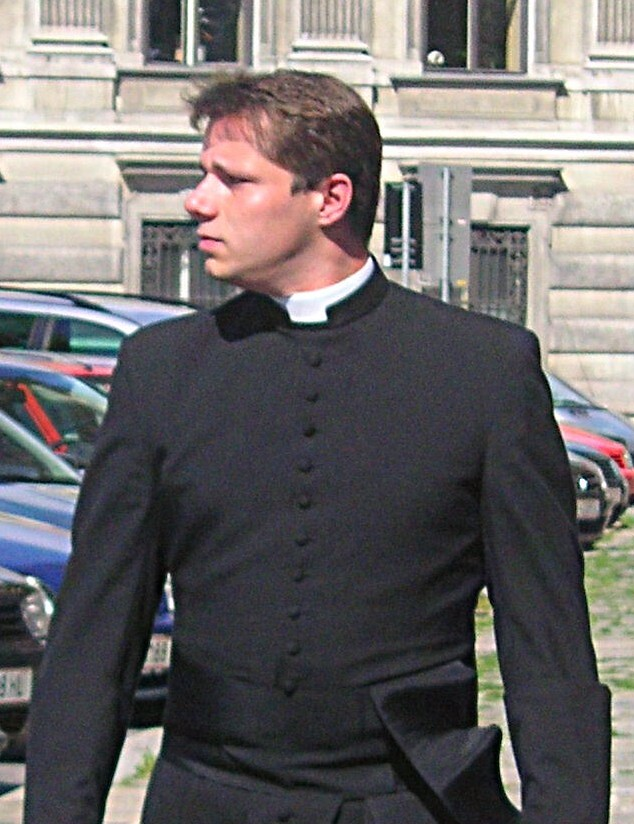
A Roman Catholic seminarian wearing a cassock with a clerical collar

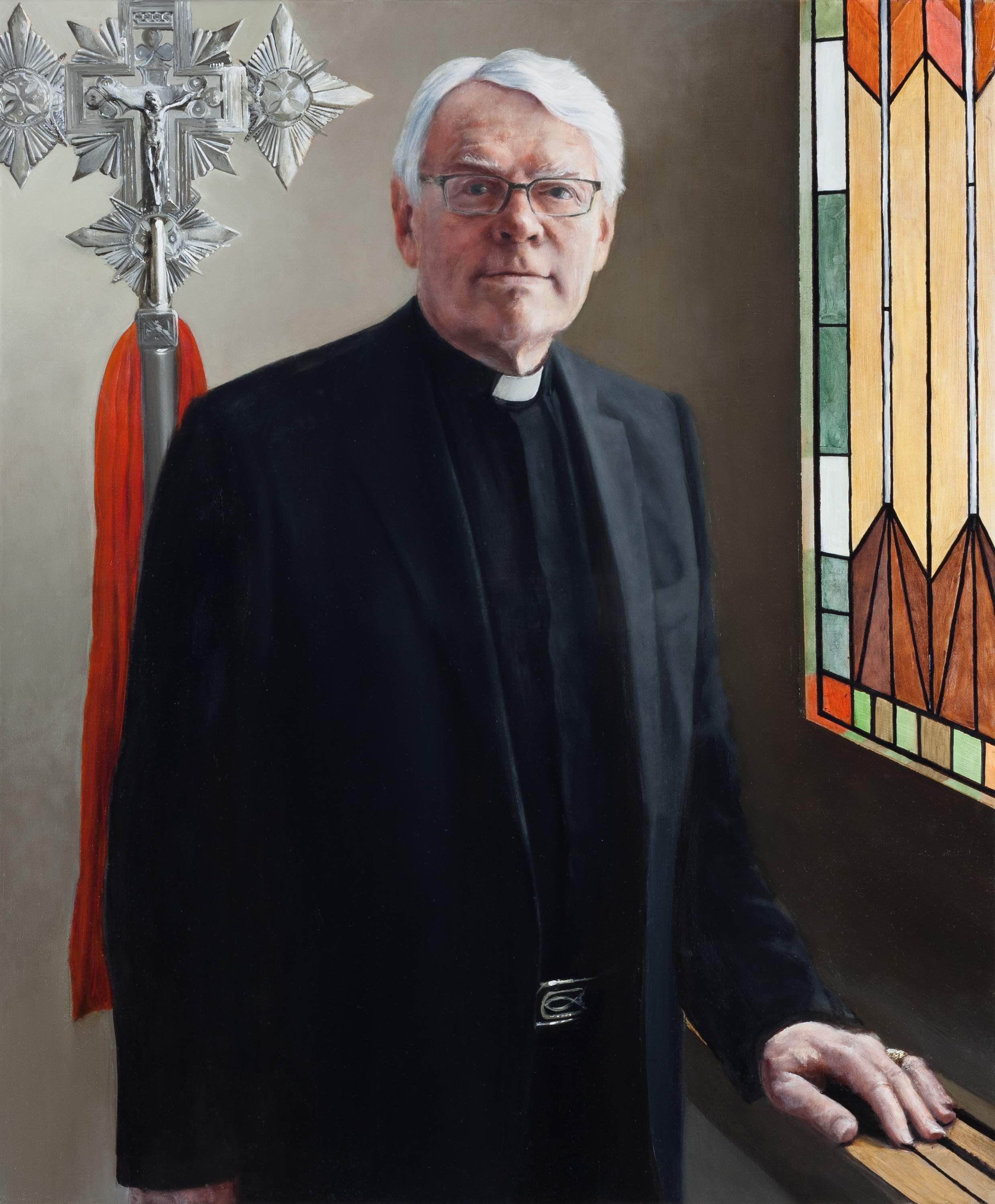
Per Henrik Hansson, a Lutheran priest in the Church of Sweden

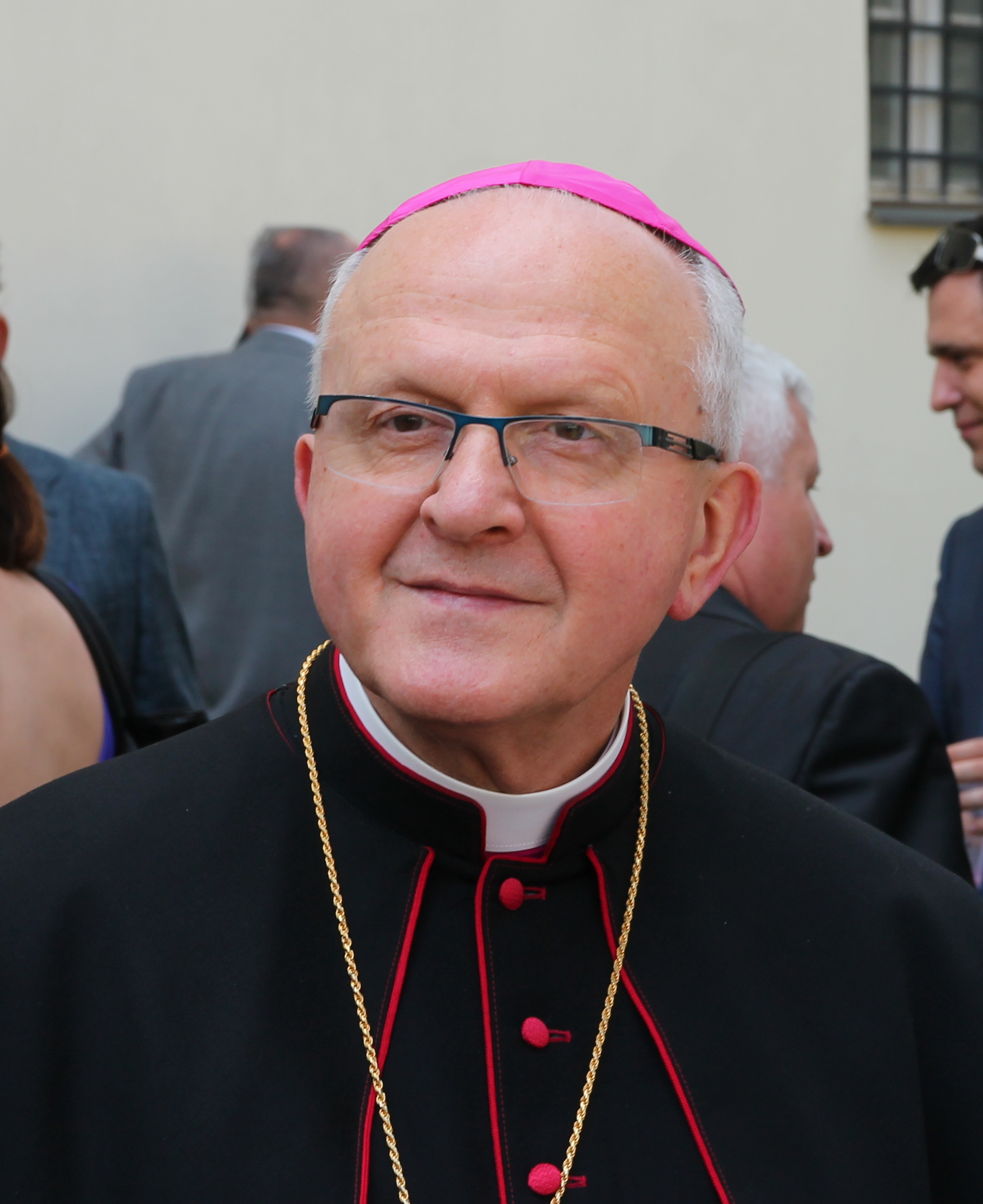
The Roman Catholic Bishop of Litoměřice Jan Baxant wearing a cassock, a zucchetto and a clerical collar

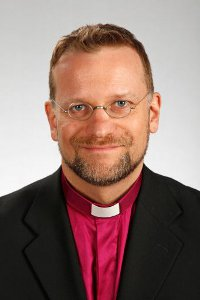
Jari Jolkkonen, bishop of the Diocese of Kuopio in the Evangelical Lutheran Church of Finland

Rabbi Abraham Cohen, editor of the Soncino Books of the Bible

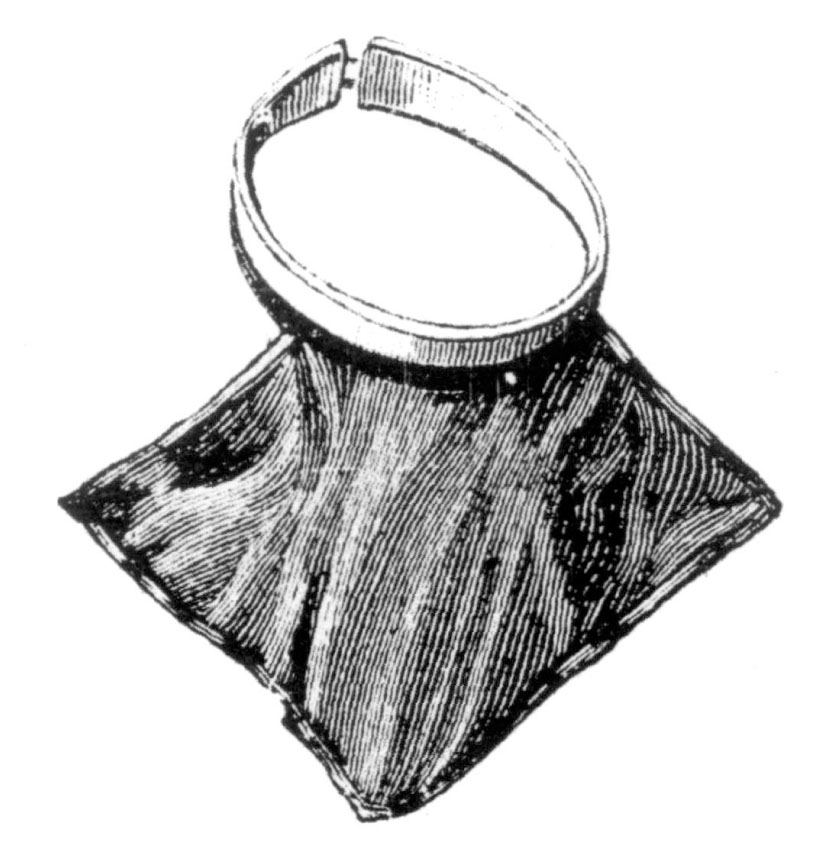
Illustration of a detached clerical collar

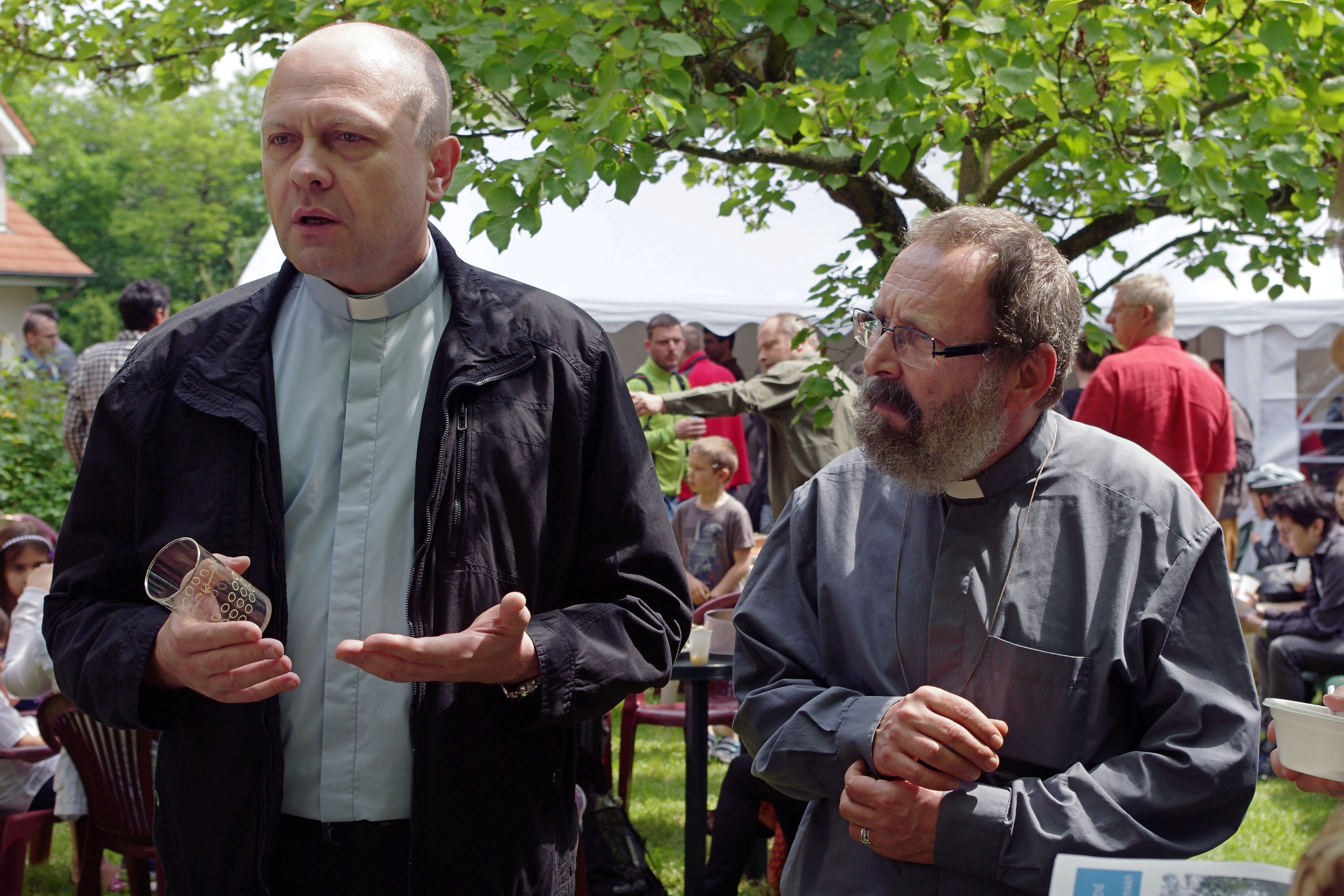
Czech Catholic priests wearing shirts with collars

== See also ==
- Collar (clothing)
