= Ryynänen =

Ryynänen is a surname of Finnish origin. Notable people with the surname are as follows:

- Eero “Rudy” Ryynänen (unknown birth/death date ), Finnish drummer, member of band The Boys.
- Eva Ryynänen (1915–2001), Finnish sculptor
- Janne Ryynänen (born 1988), Finnish skier
- Mirja Ryynänen (born 1944), Finnish politician
