= Pamilo Hydroelectric Power Plant =

Coordinates: 62°48′4″N 30°25′43″E

The Pamilo Hydroelectric Power Plant (Finnish: Pamilon voimalaitos) is a power station in Eno, Finland that supplies electricity to Finland. It was opened in 1955.

It is notable for being Vattenfall's largest hydroelectric power plant in Finland, with an installed generating capacity of 84 megawatts across three units and produces 256 gigawatt hours per year.

It is fed with water from the Lower-Koita River and Lake Koitere across a catchment area of 6,550 square kilometres. Water is held back in two basins, by two dams; the Pamilo dam and Heinäjoki dam

== See also ==
- Energy in Finland
