= Ilomantsi =

Ilomantsi Ilomants
- Municipality
- Ilomantsin kunta Ilomants kommun
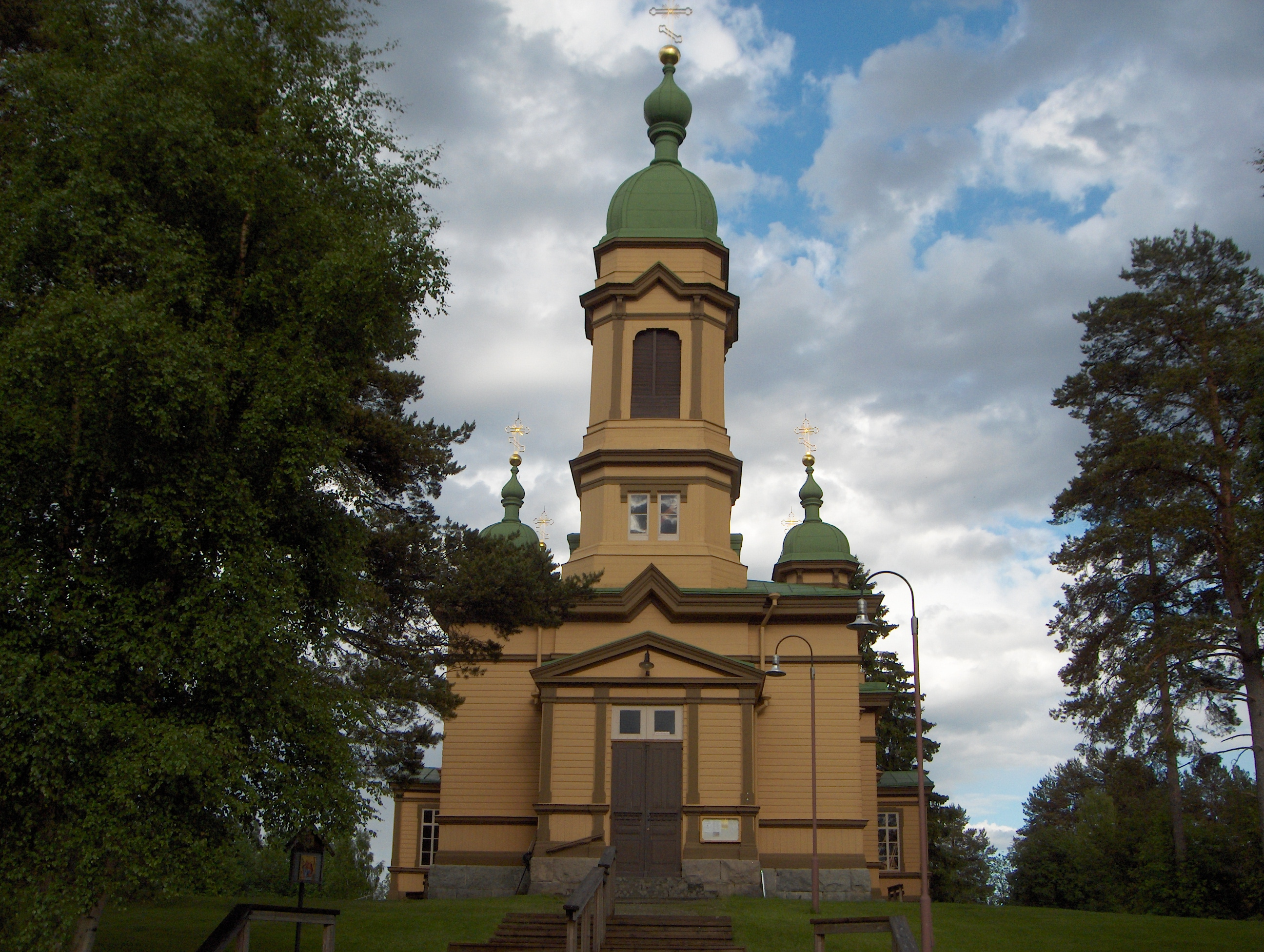
- Church of Saint Prophet Elijah

- Coat of arms

- Location of Ilomantsi in Finland
- Interactive map of Ilomantsi
- Coordinates: 62°40′N 030°56′E
- Country: Finland
- Region: North Karelia
- Sub-region: Joensuu
- Charter: 1875

Government
  - Municipal manager: Markku Lappalainen

Area (2018-01-01)
  - Total: 3,172.69 km^{2} (1,224.98 sq mi)
  - Land: 2,763.4 km^{2} (1,067.0 sq mi)
  - Water: 409.01 km^{2} (157.92 sq mi)
  - Rank: 19th largest in Finland

Population (2025-12-31)
  - Total: 4,293
  - Rank: 182nd largest in Finland
  - Density: 1.55/km^{2} (4.0/sq mi)

Population by native language
  - Finnish: 94.4% (official)
  - Swedish: 0.2%
  - Others: 5.3%

Population by age
  - 0 to 14: 8.9%
  - 15 to 64: 50.1%
  - 65 or older: 41%
- Time zone: UTC+02:00 (EET)
  - Summer (DST): UTC+03:00 (EEST)
- Website: www.ilomantsi.fi

Ilomantsi (Karelian: Il'manči or Ilomančči, Swedish: Ilomants) is a municipality and a village of Finland. It is located in the North Karelia region. The municipality has a population of 4,293 (31 December 2025) and covers an area of 3,172.69 square kilometres (1,224.98 sq mi) of which 409.01 km^{2} (157.92 sq mi) is water. The population density is 1.55 inhabitants per square kilometre (4.0/sq mi). The easternmost point of Finland (and of the continental part of the European Union) is located in Ilomantsi near the village of Hattuvaara. (In the EU, only Cyprus is located further to the east.)

The nearest town is Joensuu, 72 kilometres (45 mi) away; the distance to Helsinki is 511 km (318 mi). Neighbouring municipalities are Lieksa and Joensuu. In the east, Ilomantsi shares a 100 km (60 mi) long border with the Russian Republic of Karelia. The municipality is sparsely populated and is mostly characterized by forests and boglands. About 250 km^{2} (97 sq mi) of the area is designated as natural reserves, among them the national parks Petkeljärvi and Patvinsuo. The most important bodies of water in Ilomantsi are the lakes Koitere and Nuorajärvi and the river Koitajoki. The Pampalo gold mine is located in Ilomantsi.

The municipality is unilingually Finnish. Local words of Karelian or Russian extraction might be used in Ilomantsi. The local newspaper is called Pogostan Sanomat, i.e. "The Pogosta News".

Ilomantsi has a 17.4% Orthodox minority, which is the largest percentage among Finnish municipalities. The wooden Orthodox church of Ilomantsi is the largest in Finland and is dedicated to the prophet Elijah. There are also five Orthodox chapels (tsasouna) in the municipality. The Orthodox community of Ilomantsi is more than 500 years old and has 1,100 members.

Fighting in Ilomantsi took place during both the Winter War (1939 Battle of Ilomantsi) and the Continuation War (1944 Battle of Ilomantsi). The latter was the final battle of the Continuation War and ended with a Finnish victory.

== Demographics ==
The following table shows the decrease in population of the municipality since 1980. The regional allocation used is 1 January 2017.

1980 - 2015
Year	Population
1980	8 753
1985	8 469
1990	8 054
1995	7 832
2000	7 129
2005	6 422
2010	5 883
2015	5 336

== Sights ==
Ilomantsi offers a number of historical sites, natural features and scenery, several cultural sites and events, as well as culinary attractions. Places of interest include:

- Orthodox Church (built in 1892) Ilomantsin_ortodoksinen_kirkko
- Lutheran Church (built in 1796) Ilomantsin_kirkko
- Katri Vala Culture Center
- Lutheran Church of Kivilahti (built in 1954), Clock tower (built in 1969) Kivilahden_rajaseutukirkko
- Research Center of Mekrijärvi Mekrijärven_tutkimusasema
- Möhkö - A nearby village which was one of the key battlefields of the Winter War.
- Gun Workshop in Naarva - Museum (built in 1790) Asesepän_paja
- Lutheran Church of Naarva (built in 1958), Clock tower (built in 1971) Naarvan_rajaseutukirkko
- The Poetry Village of Parppeinvaara and the Poet's Pirtti. (An animal museum and a restaurant available)
- National Park of Patvinsuo
- National Park of Petkeljärvi
- Taistelijan talo (The Fighters' House) - Museum about the Winter War and the Continuation War (built in 1988).

== Notable ==
- Hannu Hoskonen (born 1957), politician
- Jari Jolkkonen (born 1970), the bishop of the Diocese of Kuopio
- Mateli Magdalena Kuivalatar (1771–1846), folksinger and cunning woman
- Anna Margareta Salmelin (1716–1789), prisoner of war
- Kaisa Varis (born 1975), cross-country skier and biathlete
- Henrik Renqvist (1789 - 1866), priest
