= Battle of Ilomantsi =

Battle of Ilomantsi can refer to two battles:

- Battle of Ilomantsi (1939), between Finland and Soviet Union during the Winter War
- Battle of Ilomantsi (1944), between Finland and Soviet Union during the Continuation War
