= Anna Margareta Salmelin =

Finnish prisoner of war during the Russian occupation of Finland

Anna Margareta Salmelin (1716–1789), was a Finnish prisoner of war during the Russian occupation of Finland, Lesser Wrath. She became famous for defending the rights of the Finnish prisoners in Russia after the war, when the Russians tried to prevent many prisoners from returning to Finland in order to keep them in Russia as serfs.

Her actions may have played a role in securing the 1745 release of 16 men and 12 women who had been held in Belozersk.

She was married to Johan Lackman (1702–1770). He was the parish clerk and precentor of Ilomantsi. They had three children, Juliana, Anna Gretha, and Mats (1738–1791).

Salmelin lived with her son Mats and his family after her husband died. She died in Ilomantsi on August 8, 1789.
