= Battle of Ilomantsi (1939) =

Battle of the Winter War

- Part of the Winter War
Date	10 December 1939 – 16 December 1939
Location	North Karelia, Finland
Result	Stalemate

Belligerents
Finland	Soviet Union

Commanders and leaders
Paavo Talvela; Per Ole Ekholm	Peter Alexandrov

Strength
400 initially 4,300 when Group Talvela formed (includes defense at Battle of Tolvajärvi)	Approximately 18,000

Casualties and losses
422 total casualties 125 killed 275 wounded 22 missing	Approximately 5,000 total casualties

The Battle of Ilomantsi was fought from 10 December to 16 December 1939, between Finland and the Soviet Union during the Winter War. Fighting took place near the village of Ilomantsi, in North Karelia, Finland.

== Order of battle ==
=== Finland ===
The Finnish defense initially consisted of ErP 11 ("ErP" stands for "separate battalion", or "erillinen pataljoona" in Finnish) located in the border village of Megri. ErP 11, led by Major Vilho Nikoskelainen, would later form part of newly created Task Force A, led by Major Per Ole Ekholm. Task Force A would in turn be subordinate to newly created Group Talvela, under the command of General Paavo Talvela. Group Talvela would form the defense in both Ilomantsi and Tolvajärvi and was assigned to the Finnish IV Army. The defense of Ilomantsi was the responsibility of Task Force A.

=== Soviet Union ===
The 155th Rifle Division, led by Brigade Commander Peter Alexandrov, crossed the Soviet-Finnish border at three points and headed toward Ilomantsi. Capturing the Ilomantsi road junction would allow it to threaten Korpiselkä, located 25 miles to the south, which in turn was 15 miles to the rear of the Finnish defenses at Tolvajärvi.

== Battle ==
The Soviet 155th Division opened artillery fire at the Finnish border village of Megri on 30 November 1939 at 8:00 a.m., and proceeded to cross the border at 8:30 a.m. The Finnish defense in this area consisted of one battalion, ErP 11. Being heavily outnumbered by the 155th Division, ErP 11 retreated toward the villages of Möhkö and Kallioniemi while engaging in delaying tactics.

The Finns formed Group Talvela in order to reinforce the defenses in Ilomantsi and Tolvajärvi, and Colonel Talvela arrived in the area on 7 December to take command. Meanwhile, the Soviet 155th Division continued its advance and had taken the high ground overlooking Möhkö on the same day. Major Nikoskelainen requested permission from Colonel Ekholm to withdraw his ErP 11 battalion, exhausted from their retreating fight from the frontier, to Oinaansalmi. Ekholm granted him permission to do so, but was overruled by Talvela, who emphatically intervened by phone to insist on holding Möhkö. ErP 11 repelled several attacks from the 155th Division over the next few days, but was finally forced to withdraw to Oinaansalmi on 9 December, whereby the 155th Division promptly occupied Möhkö. Oinaansalmi provided the Finns with a favorable defensive position, located behind a watercourse and on high ground.

On the same day, a Soviet battalion of 300-350 men slipped through unnoticed near Kallioniemi Ferry in the evening. Discovered by a Finnish patrol, the defenders encircled the Soviet battalion with automatic weapons under the cover of darkness. Just before dawn on 10 December, the Finns opened fire, killing every Soviet soldier. It was the first complete victory of the war for the Finns, and Group Talvela received a much-needed morale boost.

On evening of 10 December, Talvela issued orders to Ekholm for a major counteroffensive on the following day. However, it was the Soviets that would be attacking. The Soviet attacks on 11 December were repelled by the Finns, and the Finns planned their counteroffensive for the following day, 12 December. The objective of the counteroffensive was to retake Möhkö. Three battalions would attack Möhkö from the front and from both flanks. As the attack progressed, the two flanking battalions reached the western edge of the village from the north and south. But instead of turning toward the enemy's rear, they returned in their tracks, and the attack failed. The battalions' inability to maintain tactical contact with each other led to the failed attack, according to Talvela.

The 155th Division launched attacks of their own on 12 December, but these failed as well. Additional Soviet attacks on 13 December were also repelled by the Finns. The Soviets in turn repelled Finnish attacks on the same day.

During fighting on 14 December, the Finns obtained maps and other documents from fallen Soviet officers, giving them insight into the composition of the Soviet 155th Division and its future attack plans. A succession of Soviet attacks over the next few days were repelled by the Finns.

== Outcome ==
The situation had developed into a stalemate. Though the Finns had halted the progress of the 155th Division and prevented it from reaching the Ilomantsi road junction, they were unable to retake Möhkö, and the village would remain under Soviet control until the end of the war in March 1940. The lines around Ilomantsi stabilized as both armies concentrated on other fronts. Sporadic fighting would nonetheless continue in the Ilomantsi sector. The fact that the 155th Division did not have skis would essentially immobilize the division as winter progressed and snow depth increased.

The casualties of Task Force A included 125 killed, 275 injured, and 22 missing (these figures are for the entire duration of the war). The 155th Division's total number of casualties was estimated at around 5,000 at the end of December 1939. This included 1,700 killed, wounded, and missing, and 3,300 due to sickness and freezing.

== Sources ==
=== English ===
- Chew, Allen (1971). The White Death: The Epic of the Soviet-Finnish Winter War. Michigan State University Press. ISBN 978-087-013-167-7.
- Jowett, Philip (2023). The Winter War 1939–40. Casemate Publishers. ISBN 978-163-624-238-5.
- Nenye, Vesa; Munter, Peter; Wirtanen, Toni; Birks, Chris (2015). Finland at War: The Winter War 1939–40. Bloomsbury Publishing. ISBN 978-147-281-359-6.

=== Finnish ===
- Sotatieteen laitos. Sotahistorian toimisto (1978). Talvisodan historia. 3, Sotatoimet Laatokan ja Jäämeren välillä (in Finnish). WSOY. ISBN 951-0-08148-5.
- Enkenberg, Ilkka (2020). Talvisota Väreissä (in Finnish). Readme.fi. ISBN 978-952-373-053-3.
- Härkönen, Armas (2022). Talvisota Ilomantsissa (in Finnish). Books on Demand. ISBN 978-952-806-212-7.
- Kukkonen, Erkki William (1955). Tolvajärven ja Ilomantsin taistelut vv. 1939-40 (in Finnish). Otava.
