= Veikko Larkas =

Finnish architect

Veikko Viljo Vilhelm Larkas (27 March 1909, in Helsinki – 1969) was a Finnish architect. A native of Helsinki, he graduated from the Aalto University School of Science and Technology in 1938. Larkas is particularly known for his designs for a number of churches throughout Finland, including the Pielisensuu Church.

== Compilation of Churches designed by Larkas ==
- Hoilola church (Joensuu), 1950
- Värtsilä church (Värtsilä), 1950
- Haukivuoren church (Mikkeli), 1951
- Enontekiö church (Enontekiö), 1952
- Kyyjärvi church (Kyyjärvi), 1953
- Viinijärvi church (Liperi), 1953
- Veitsiluoto church (Kemi), 1957
- Kauhajoki church (Kauhajoki), 1958
- Pielisensuu church (Joensuu), 1960
- Kolari church (Kolari), 1965
- Valkeakoski church (Valkeakoski), 1969
