= 155th Rifle Division =

Former Soviet military formation

- Active: 1939-1945
- Country: Soviet Union
- Branch: Red Army
- Type: Infantry
- Engagements: Winter War: Battle of Ilomantsi (1939); World War II: Battle of Bryansk (1941); Battle of Moscow; Siege of Budapest

The 155th Rifle Division was an infantry division of the Red Army of the Soviet Union. It was established in Opotschka in 1939. In December 1939, it fought in the Battle of Ilomantsi during the Winter War. In October 1941, it was destroyed in Bryansk.

On October 28, 1941 the 1st and 2nd Moscow Worker's Brigades were in Moscow formed using Destroyer Battalions' troops, similar to the earlier People's Militia formations. On November 14, 1941, they were upgraded in status to the 4th and 5th Moscow Rifle Divisions respectively. On January 20, 1942 the 4th Moscow Rifle Division was redesignated the 155th Rifle Division (Second Formation).

During the rest of the Second World War, it fought in Kalinin, Kursk, the Carpathians, and Budapest. By May 1945, it served with the 27th Army of the 3rd Ukrainian Front. In the summer of 1945, the division was disbanded and the soldiers then served with the Southern Group of Forces.
