= Koitajoki =

River in the countries of Finland and Russia

Coordinates: 62°52′N 30°16′E

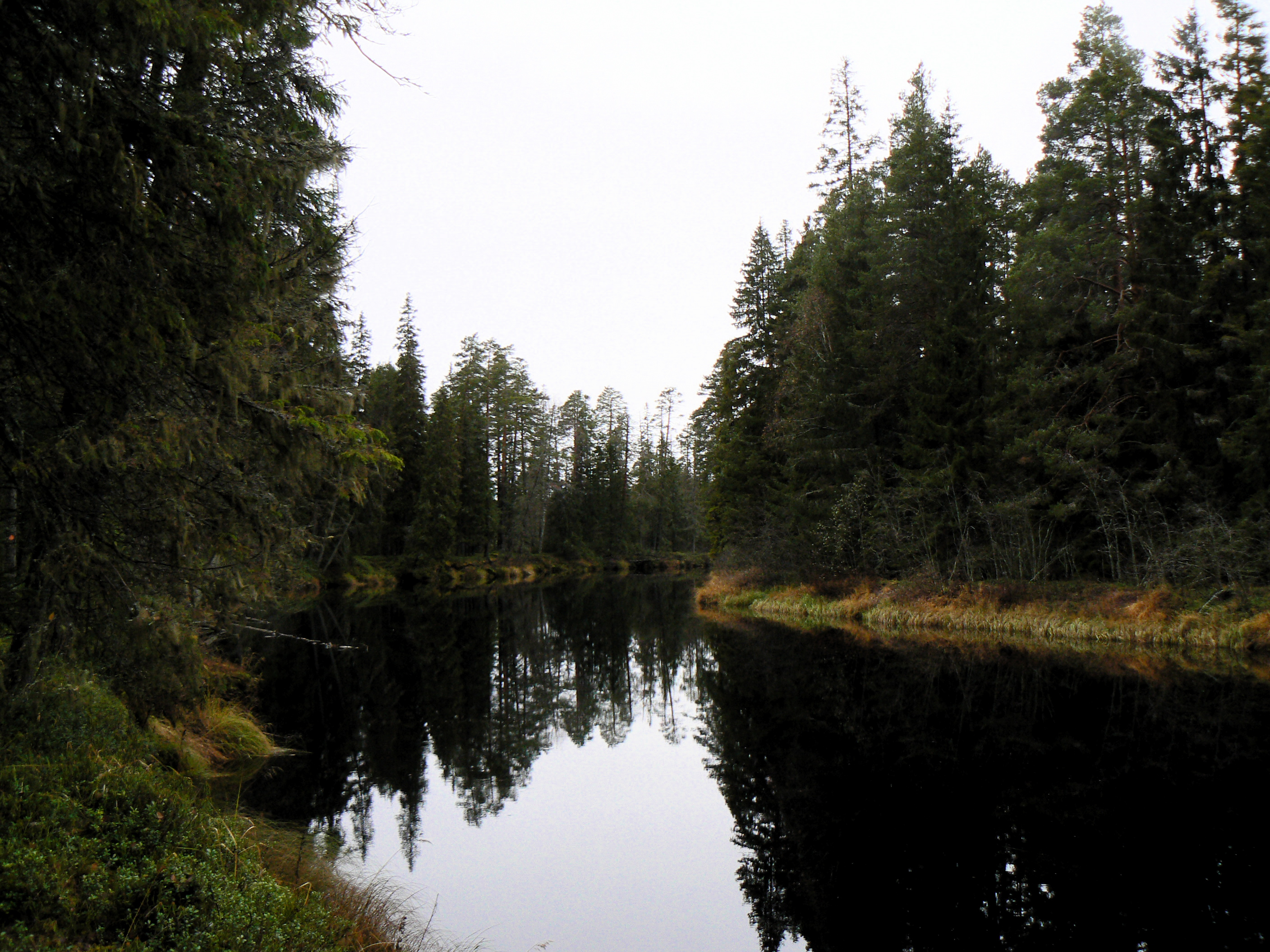
From the upper course

Koitajoki (or the Koita River) (Russian: Койтайоки) is a river in Eastern Finland and partly in Russia in Northern Europe. Having its origin near the international boundary in Ilomantsi of Northern Karelia, Finland, the Koitajoki River enters the Republic of Karelia in Russia, before returning to Finland some 30 kilometres (19 mi) further south. It then flows northwest through the Petkeljärvi National Park and the Kesonsuo bog area, and further downstream receives the outflow from Lake Koitere. The main part of the waters are then directed through a tunnel of the 84-megawatt Pamilo hydroelectric power plant, which bypasses some 20 kilometres (12 mi) of the natural course of the lowest part of the river.

Koitajoki is a tributary of Pielisjoki that flows from the lake Pielinen into Lake Pyhäselkä in Northern Karelia, Finland. It is part of the Vuoksi River basin in Finland and Russia, which flows through Lake Ladoga in Russia and further through the Neva River into the Gulf of Finland.

The river has cultural and historical value, as it has served as part of the inspiration for the Kalevala.

== See also ==
- List of rivers of Finland
