= Petkeljärvi National Park =

National park in Finland

- IUCN category II (national park)
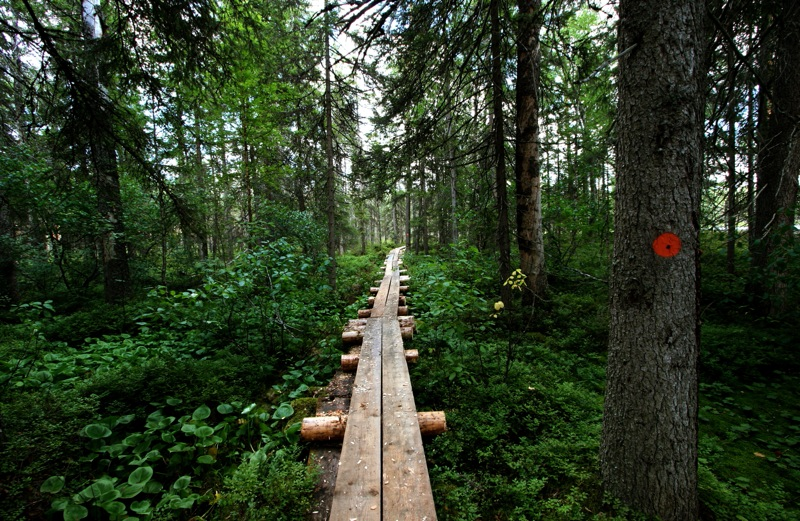

- Location within Finland
- Location: North Karelia, Finland
- Coordinates: 62°35′N 031°11′E
- Area: 7 km^{2} (2.7 sq mi)
- Established: 1956
- Visitors: 17,300 (in 2024)
- Governing body: Metsähallitus
- Website: https://www.luontoon.fi/en/destinations/petkeljarvi-national-park

Petkeljärvi National Park (Finnish: Petkeljärven kansallispuisto) is a national park in Ilomantsi in the North Karelia region of Finland. It was established in 1956 and covers 6 square kilometres (2 sq mi). Its specialities are e.g. fortification from the Continuation War, some of which have been renovated, and valuable eskers. The park's vegetation mostly consists of light Scots pine forests. The park, along with Patvinsuo National Park, belongs to the North-Karelian biosphere reserves of UNESCO.

== See also ==
- List of national parks of Finland
- Protected areas of Finland
