= Nuorajärvi =

Lake in Ilomantsi, Finland

- Location within Finland
- Coordinates: 62°40′54″N 31°08′06″E
- Basin countries: Finland
- Surface area: 39.05 km^{2} (15.08 sq mi)
- Average depth: 2.34 m (7 ft 8 in)
- Max. depth: 12 m (39 ft)
- Water volume: 0.0932 km^{3} (75,600 acre⋅ft)
- Shore length^{1}: 206.34 km (128.21 mi)
- Surface elevation: 144.7 m (475 ft)
- Frozen: December–April
- Islands: 63
- ^{1} Shore length is not a well-defined measure.

Nuorajärvi is a medium-sized lake in the Vuoksi main catchment area. It is located in the municipality of Ilomantsi in the Northern Karelia region in Finland.

Nuorajärvi has an area of 39 square kilometers (15 sq mi) and a volume of 93.2 million cubic meters (3.29×10^{9} cu ft). Its average depth is 2.34 meters (7 ft 8 in), while the maximum depth is 12 meters (39 ft). The lake has 63 islands in total.

The name of Nuorajärvi was first mentioned in 1589 as Noora Jerffui by, referring to a village on its shores. The name is of Sámi origin, related to either Northern Sámi nuorri meaning 'strait (between the mainland and an island)' or njuorra, 'shallow point, underwater rock'.

== See also ==
- List of lakes in Finland
