= Eva Ryynänen =

Finnish sculptor (1915-2001)

Professori Eva Ryynänen
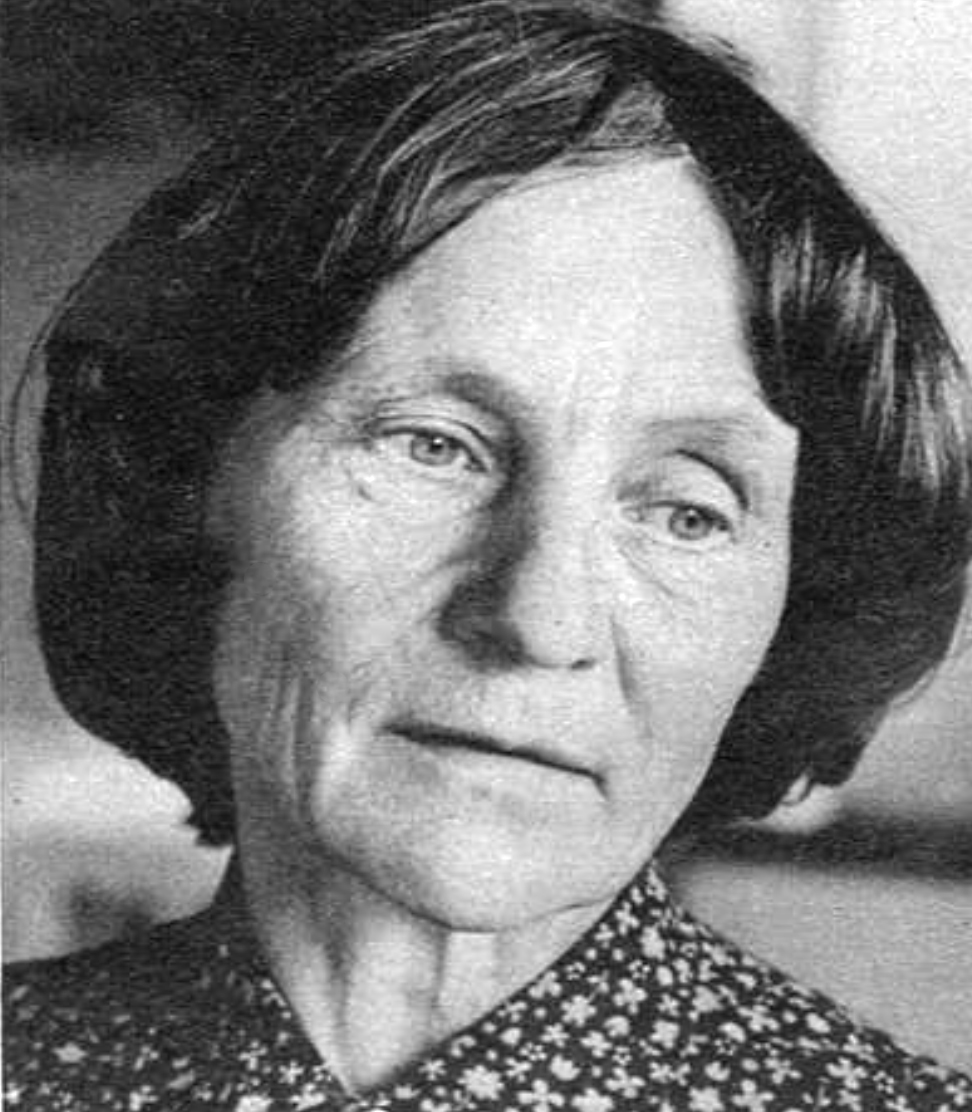
- Eeva Ryynänen in 1969
- Born: Eva Åsenbrygg; 15 June 1915; Vieremä, Grand Duchy of Finland
- Died: 18 October 2001 (aged 86); Lieksa, Finland
- Education: Academy of Fine Arts, Helsinki
- Known for: Wood sculpture

Eva Ryynänen (née Åsenbrygg; 15 June 1915 – 18 October 2001) was a Finnish sculptor known especially for her work in wood.

== Career ==
Ryynänen studied at the Academy of Fine Arts (now part of the University of the Arts Helsinki) from 1934 to 1939.

Her debut solo exhibition was in 1940. Her breakthrough came in 1974, as a result of an exhibition at the Amos Anderson Art Museum in Helsinki, and a national tour following it.

She created in total c. 500 works, of which approximately 50 are in collections outside Finland.

She is especially known for her numerous wooden sculptures, reliefs and wood carvings housed in many Finnish churches. For example, she carved the pulpit for the Pielisensuu Church (1960). She also worked extensively with bronze and marble.

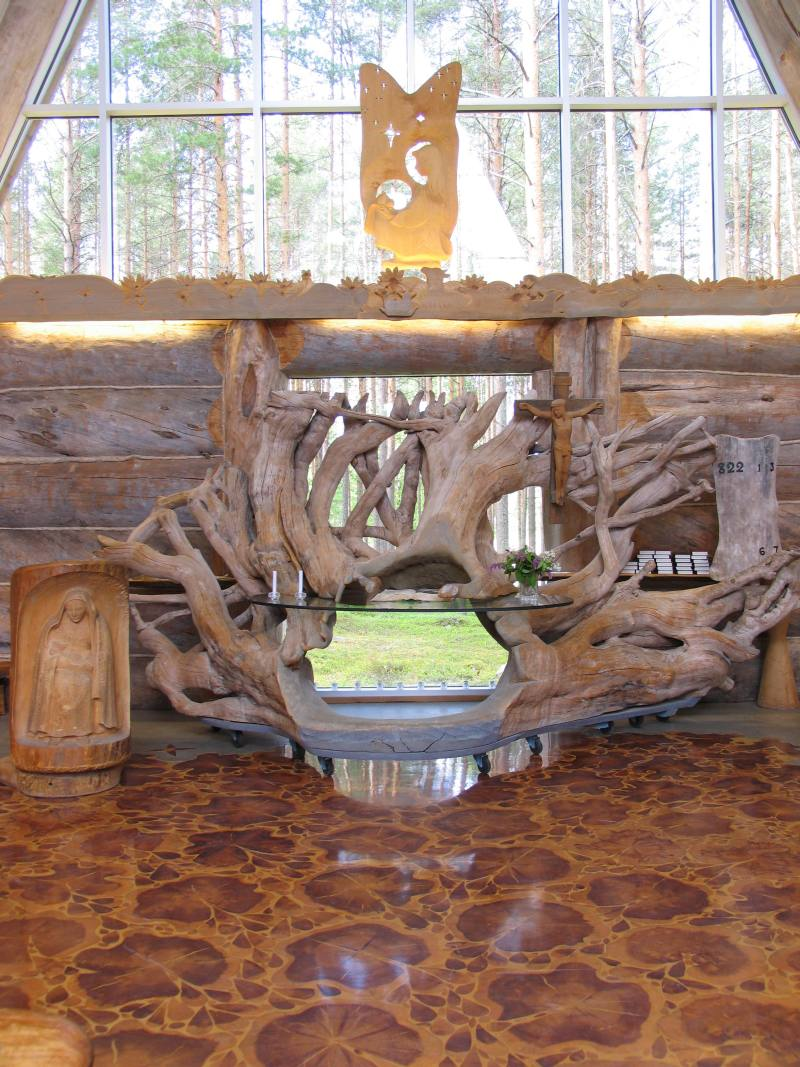
The altar of Paateri church

Her perhaps most famous creation is the Paateri church in North Karelia, which she built in 1989-1991 entirely of wood. She sculpted everything, including individually designed pews; the altar is an upturned root cluster of a spruce tree.

== Honours and awards ==
In 1977, Ryynänen was awarded the Pro Finlandia medal of the Order of the Lion of Finland.

In 1998, the honorary title of Professori was conferred on Ryynänen by the President of Finland.

She also received the Kalevala 150th anniversary medal in 1985, as well as numerous other awards.
