= Jari Jolkkonen =

Finnish prelate (born 1970)

The Right Reverend Jari Jolkkonen
- Bishop of Kuopio
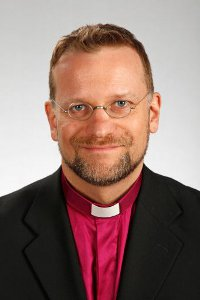
- Church: Evangelical Lutheran Church of Finland
- Elected: 2012
- Installed: 2012
- Predecessor: Wille Riekkinen

Orders
- Ordination: 1995
- Consecration: 6 May 2012 by Kari Mäkinen

Personal details
- Born: 5 March 1970 (age 56) Ilomantsi, Finland
- Spouse: Hanna Vasiljev
- Children: 5

Jari Juhani Jolkkonen (born 5 March 1970) is a Finnish prelate who has been bishop of the Diocese of Kuopio since May 2012.

== Biography ==
Born in Ilomantsi, Jolkkonen graduated as an undergraduate in 1989 and later gained a Master of Science in Theology in 1994. He undertook his Ph.D. in 2005 at the University of Helsinki. He ordained a priest in 1995 and served as Secretary General of the Bishop's Conference since 2007. He was also the secretary of Bishop Eero Huovinen, former Bishop of Helsinki. Jolkkonen is also a Docent of the University of Eastern Finland in his field of systematic theology, especially ecumenism. He is also a member of the Advisory Board of the University of Eastern Finland. Jolkkonen received the Church Communications Prize in 1995, together with search engineer Taneli Heikka and Marianne Heikkilä. Jolkkonen's spouse is a priest herself, Hanna Vasiljev. They have five children.

Preceded by Wille Riekkinen	Bishop of Kuopio; 2012–	Succeeded by
