= Patvinsuo National Park =

National park in North Karelia region, Finland

- IUCN category II (national park)
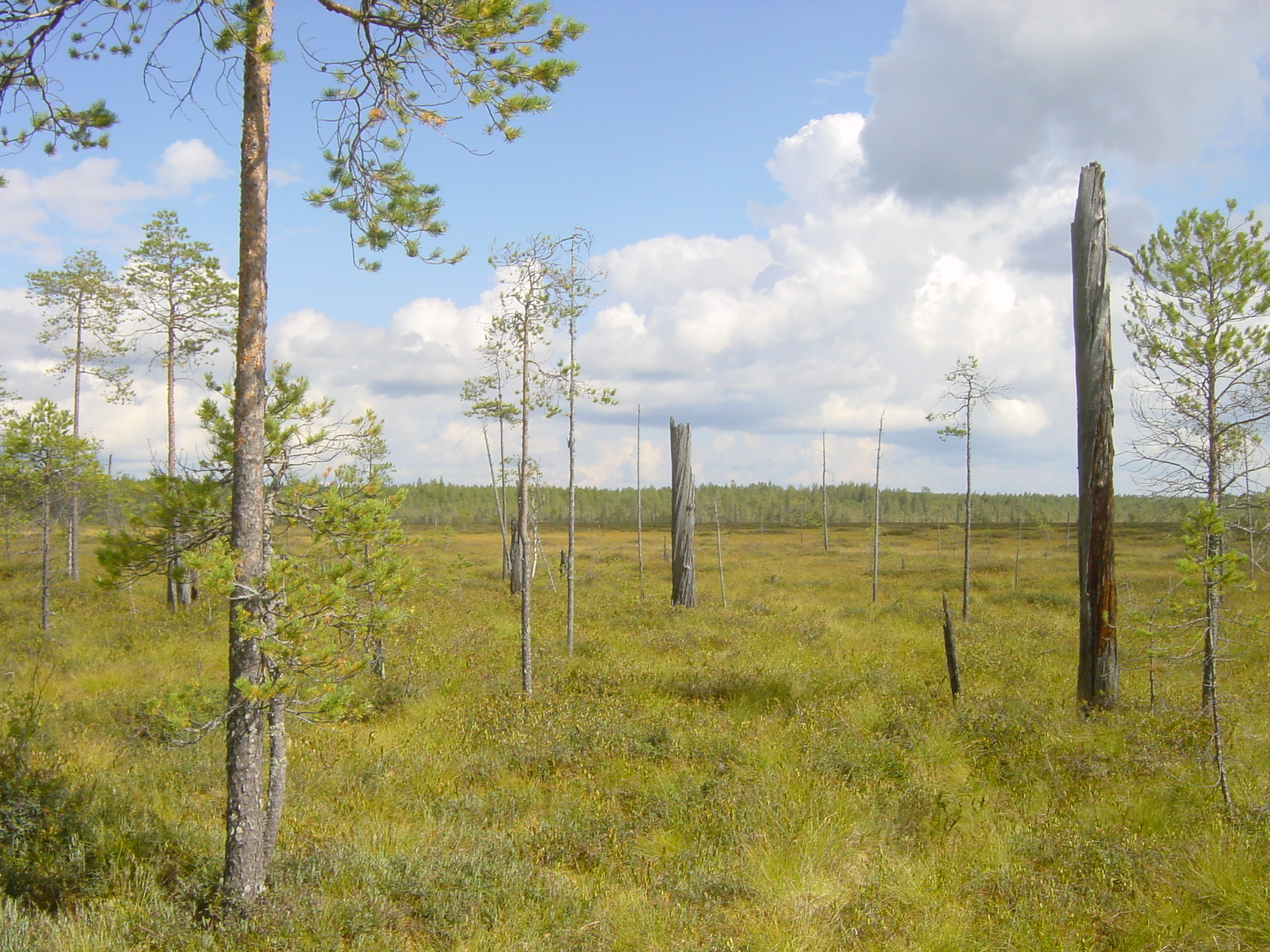

- Location within Finland
- Location: North Karelia, Finland
- Coordinates: 63°06′41″N 030°42′16″E
- Area: 105 km^{2} (41 sq mi)
- Established: 1982
- Visitors: 18,600 (in 2024)
- Governing body: Metsähallitus
- Website: https://www.luontoon.fi/en/destinations/patvinsuo-national-park

Patvinsuo National Park (Finnish: Patvinsuon kansallispuisto) is a national park in the North Karelia region of Finland, in the municipalities of Lieksa and Ilomantsi. It was established in 1982 and covers 105 square kilometres (41 sq mi). There are 80 kilometres (50 mi) of marked walking trails in the area. The park has bogs, former managed forest and slash-and-burn areas and some old-growth forests. Suomujärvi lake is located in the northeast area in the park.

== See also ==
- List of national parks of Finland
- Protected areas of Finland
