= Koitere =

- Location within Finland
- Location: Ilomantsi, North Karelia
- Coordinates: 62°57′N 030°42′E
- Type: Lake
- Catchment area: Vuoksi
- Basin countries: Finland
- Surface area: 163.67 km^{2} (40,440 acres)
- Average depth: 6.71 m (22.0 ft)
- Max. depth: 46.46 m (152.4 ft)
- Water volume: 1.1 km^{3} (890,000 acre⋅ft)
- Shore length^{1}: 424.22 km (263.60 mi)
- Surface elevation: 143.4 m (470 ft)
- Islands: Lammassaari, Juuansaari, Hirvatsaari, Iso Viitasaari
- ^{1} Shore length is not a well-defined measure.

Koitere is a rather large lake in Ilomantsi, North Karelia, Finland. The lake, which sports 451 islands and many beaches, is located in the middle of wilderness. The river Koitajoki, which is a tributary of the river Pielisjoki in North Karelia, flows from the lake.

Koitere Lacus, one of the apparent methane lakes on Saturn's moon Titan is named after this lake. That lake is located 79.4N and 36.14°W on Titan's globe and is presumed to be composed of liquid methane and ethane.
