= Diocese of Kuopio =

Diocese of Kuopio Kuopion hiippakunta
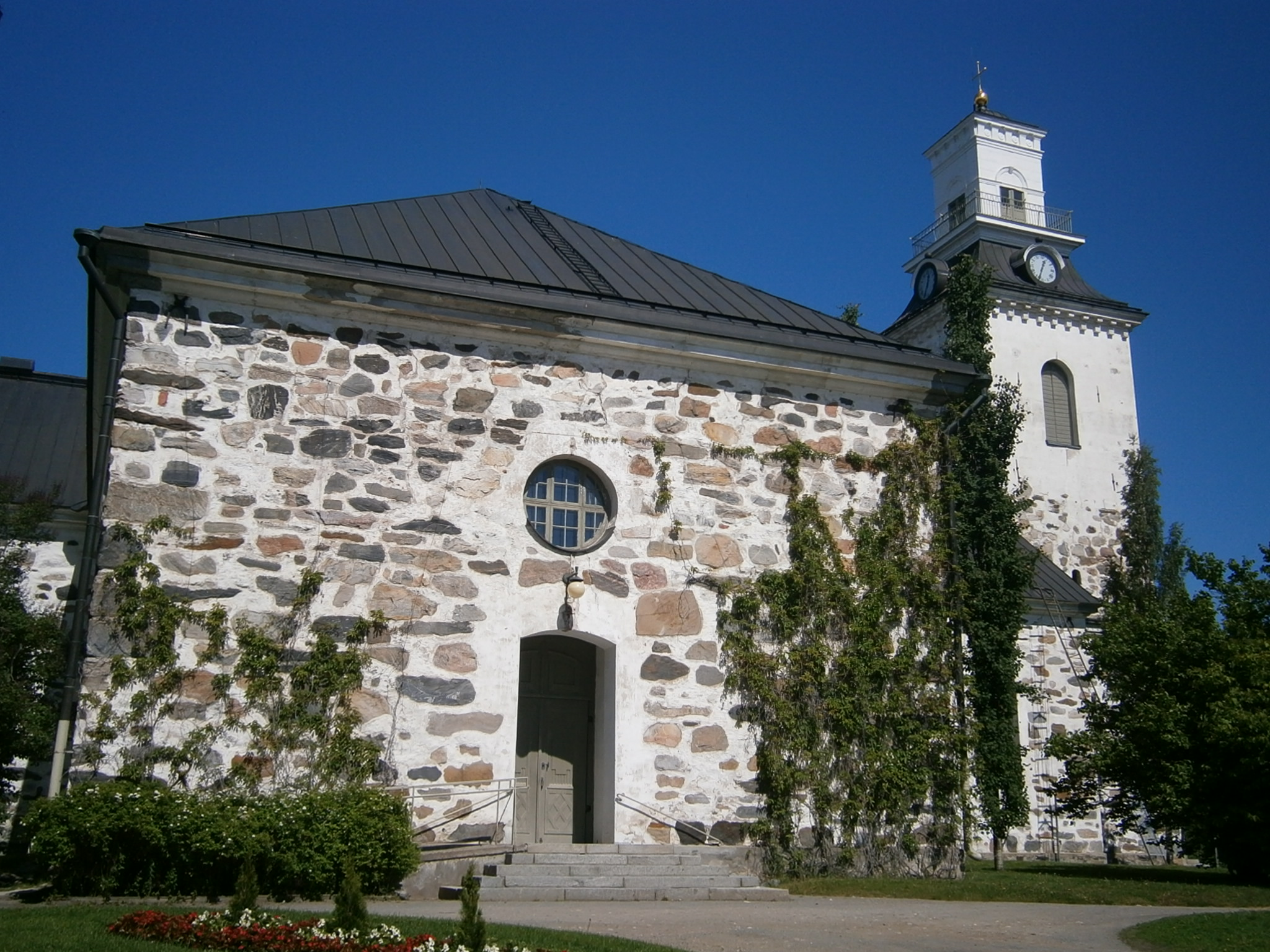

- Coat of arms

Location
- Country: Finland
- Ecclesiastical province: Turku & Finland
- Metropolitan: Archbishop of Turku & Finland

Statistics
- Parishes: 54
- Members: 377000

Information
- Denomination: Evangelical Lutheran Church of Finland
- Cathedral: Kuopio Cathedral

Current leadership
- Bishop: Jari Jolkkonen
- Metropolitan Archbishop: Tapio Luoma

The Diocese of Kuopio (Finnish: Kuopion hiippakunta, Swedish: Kuopio stift) is a diocese within the Evangelical Lutheran Church of Finland. It was founded in 1939.

== Bishops of Kuopio ==
- Eino Sormunen, 1939–1962
- Olavi Kares, 1962–1974
- Paavo Kortekangas, 1974–1981
- Jukka Malmivaara, 1981–1984
- Matti Sihvonen, 1984–1996
- Wille Riekkinen, 1996–2012
- Jari Jolkkonen, 2012–present

== See also ==
- Evangelical Lutheran Church of Finland
