= Heikel =

Heikel is a Finnish surname from a widely branched family descended from the Heikkilä farm in the village of Oulunsuu, now a district of Oulu, Finland. Jakob Henriksson Heikkilä sold the farm in 1723 and became a merchant in Oulu. His children changed the name to Heikel; three of his sons studied at the Universities of Uppsala and Turku. In time, the Heikel family became a significant scholarly family in Finland. Branches of the family also live in Sweden and Denmark. A large number of members of the family, under the influence of the Fennoman movement, fennicized the name to Heikinheimo in the 20th century. Varying spellings of the name have occurred in older times, such as Heickel and Heikell, while confusion with another unrelated family, Heickell, also occurs.

People with the name Heikel include:

- Anna Heikel (1838–1907), Finnish educator and Baptist pioneer
- Axel Heikel (1851–1924), Finnish ethnographer
- Carl Johan Heikel (1786–1896), Finnish lawmaker
- Elia Heikel (1852–1917), Finnish architect
- Felix Heikel (1844–1921), Finnish economist and politician
- Henrik Heikel (1808–1867), Finnish priest and educator
- Ivar Heikel (1861–1952), Finnish philologist
- Rosina Heikel (1842–1929), Finnish doctor
- Theodor August Heikel (1863–1936), Finnish forester and politician
- Vicki-Anne Heikell, New Zealand paper conservator
- Viktor Heikel (1842–1927), Finnish gymnastics teacher
- Yngvar Heikel (1889–1956), Finnish ethnologist
