= Heikinheimo =

Heikinheimo is a Finnish-language surname that may refer to:

- Aarne Heikinheimo (1894–1938), Finnish Major General.
- Eva Heikinheimo (surname Heikel until 1906; 1879–1955), Finnish educator and politician.
- Harras Heikinheimo (1914–1999), Finnish chess player.
- Seppo Heikinheimo (1938–1997), Finnish music journalist, musicologist, translator and writer.
- Vesa Heikinheimo (born 1983), Finnish footballer.

== See also ==
- Heikel – name from which Heikinheimo was fennicized
