= Ivar Heikel =

Finnish philologist and historian (1861–1952)

Ivar August Heikel
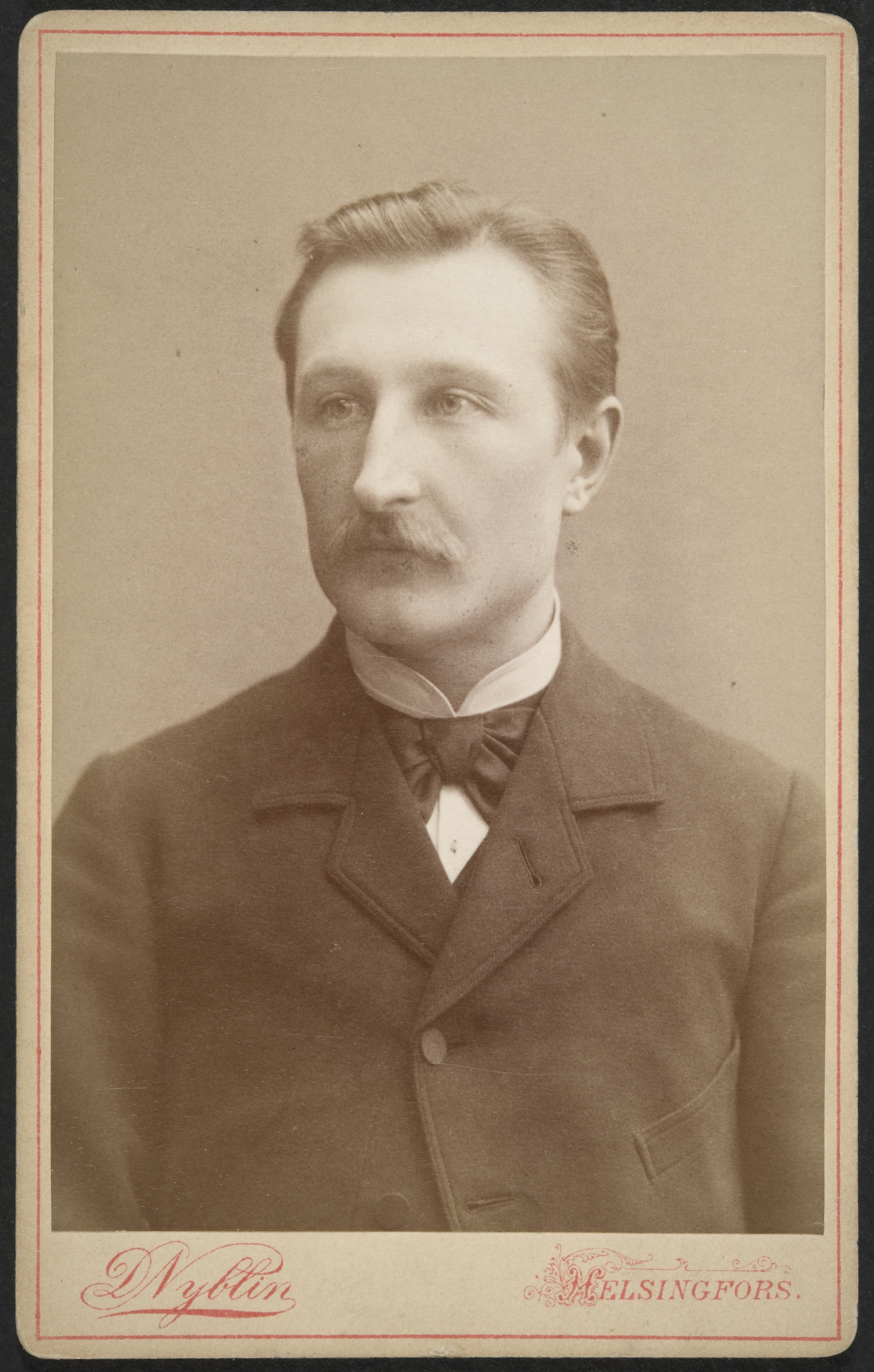
- Ivar Heikel in the early 1890s. Credit: Daniel Nyblin.
- Born: 16 January 1861; Nykarleby, Finland
- Died: 8 October 1952 (aged 91); Helsinki, Finland
- Occupation(s): Philologist, intellectual historian

Ivar August Heikel (16 January 1861 – 8 October 1952) was a Finnish philologist and intellectual historian. He was the nephew of priest and educator Henrik Heikel. He was also the cousin of gymnastics teacher Viktor, educator Anna, banker and politician Felix, and ethnographer Axel Heikel as well as maternal grandfather to sociologist Erik Allardt.

Heikel was born in 1861 in Nykarleby, Finland to pastor August Heikel and Aurora Emilia née von Knorring and had seven siblings. Heikel became associate professor (docent) of Classical Philology at the University of Helsinki in 1885 and was professor of Greek Literature between 1888 and 1926. He was rector of the university from 1907–1911 and 1920–1922.

In his extensive writings he dealt mainly with ancient subjects. He developed a particular interest in early Christian scholar Eusebius of Caesarea. As emeritus, he devoted himself to translation work as well as translating Eusebius' Church History into Swedish and Finnish.

He was a member of the clergy (see: Estates of the Realm) as a representative of the university at the last two Diets of Finland.

Heikel died in 1952 in Helsinki, Finland.

== Bibliography ==
- Filologins studium vid Åbo universitet (1894)
- Eusebius Werke I (1902)
- Sosialismi (1907)
- Eusebius Werke VI (1913)
- Platon (1919)
- Från antikens värld (1920)
- Retorik (1923)
- J. L. Runeberg (1926)
- De kristna och den antika hedendomen : skildringar från kristendomsförföljelsernas och martyrernas tid (in Swedish). Stockholm: Natur och kultur. 1927.
- Lyhyt ruotsin kielioppi (1928, 1930)
- Ruotsinkielen oppijakso I-II (1929)
- Stilistik (1929)
- Antik livssyn (1930)
- Kortfattad latinsk-svensk ordbok (1932)
- Grekisk-svensk ordbok till Nya Testamentet (1934, 4th edition 2013, with Anton Fridrichsen)
- Latinalais-suomalainen sanakirja (1935)
- Helsingfors universitet 1640–1940/Helsingin yliopisto 1640–1940 (1940)
- Minnen från min levnad I–III (1945–1947)

Educational offices
Preceded by Edvard Hjelt	Rector of Imperial Alexander University; 1907–1911	Succeeded by Anders Donner
Preceded by Waldemar Ruin	Rector of Helsinki University; 1920–1922	Succeeded by Hugo Suolahti
