= Herman Daniel Paul =

Prussian musician (1827–1885)

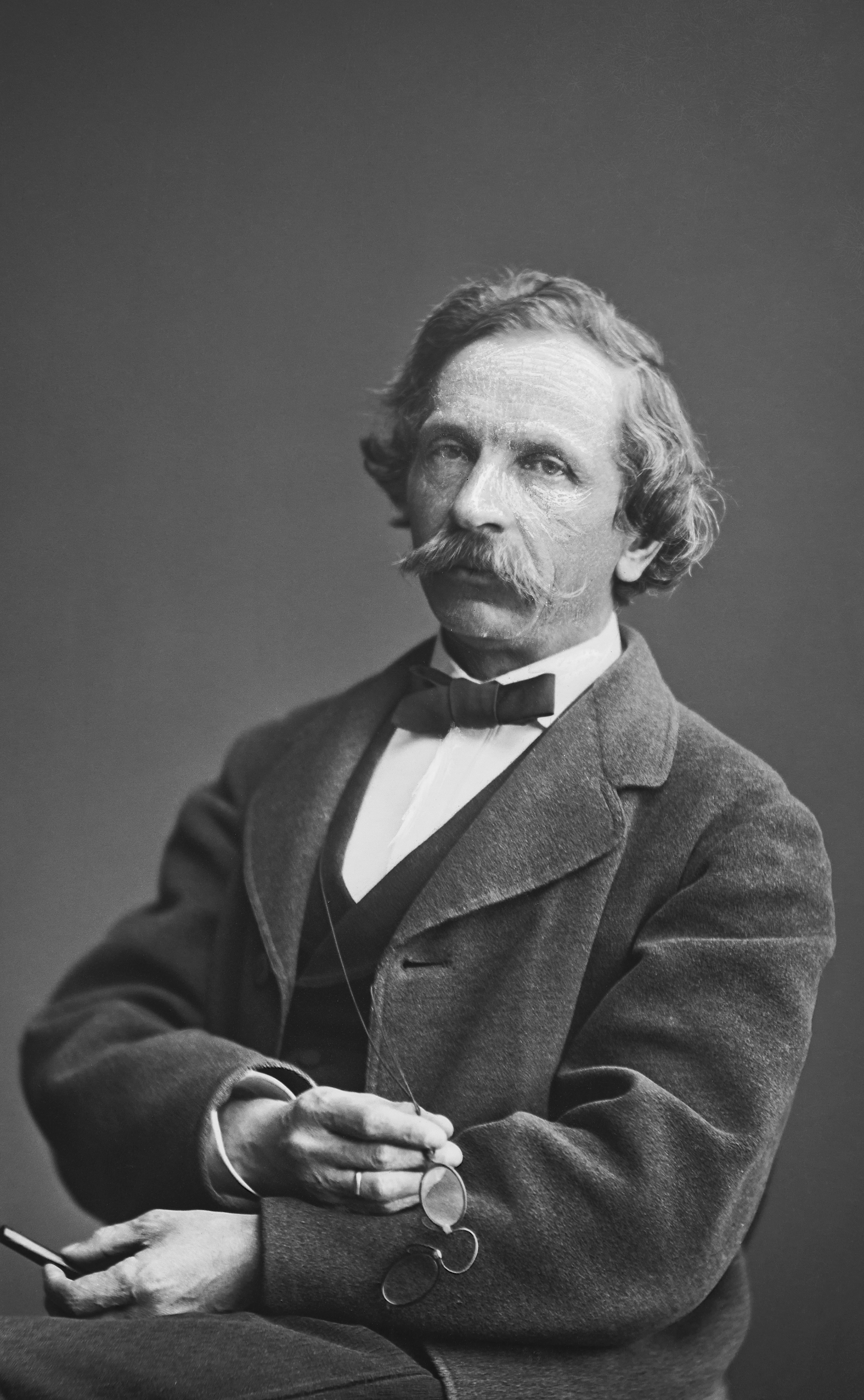
Herman Daniel Paul; photograph by Daniel Nyblin, 1878. History Photo Collection, National Board of Antiquities.

Herman Daniel Paul (17 July 1827 in Schwedt an der Oder, Brandenburg, Kingdom of Prussia - 4 December 1885 Helsinki) was a Kingdom of Prussia-born musician and lecturer at the University of Helsinki, who translated the Kalevala into German, among other works.

== Life ==
Paul's father was a government councilor, Johann Paul, and his mother was Dorothea Paul. He attended high school in Berlin, studied music, and then held various positions in music, circling the violin countries of the Baltic Sea region from 1858 to 1862. Paul moved to Helsinki in 1859, founded a music store there in 1862 and worked as a concert reviewer. He was an adjunct professor of German at the University of Helsinki from 1869 to 1885 and taught German and Russian at various educational institutions in Helsinki. Paul also served as a regular critic of the Hufvudstadsbladet from 1865 to 1878. In 1884 he received the title of Fellow Counselor.

Paul's translation of the Kalevala from Swedish into German appeared between 1885 and 1886 under the title Kalevala, das Volksepos der Finnen, a preference for Schiefner's earlier translation. The poem's length in the translation differs slightly from the Finnish poems. He also translated Johan Ludvig Runeberg's play The Kings of Salami and Zacharias Topelius' Travel in Finland. The Finnish poetry he translated included Finnische Dichtungen (1866) and Aus dem Norden (1887). He also prepared German grammar and reading exercises for schools, of which Yrjö Sakari Yrjö-Koskinen produced Finnish versions.

In the winter of 1859, Paul's trip to Lapland and his diary during his trip were published in the 1860 Papperslyktan weekly under the name Slädparti till Lappland, blad ur min dagbok. He also made pencil drawings of his journey.

Paul was married to Evelina Lovisa Albertina Bonsdorff (d. 1909) since 1861, and had four children.

== Works ==
- Kalevala (translator)
- From the North (translator, ethnographer)
