= Axel Olai Heikel =

Finnish ethnographer (1851–1924)

Professor Axel Olai Heikel
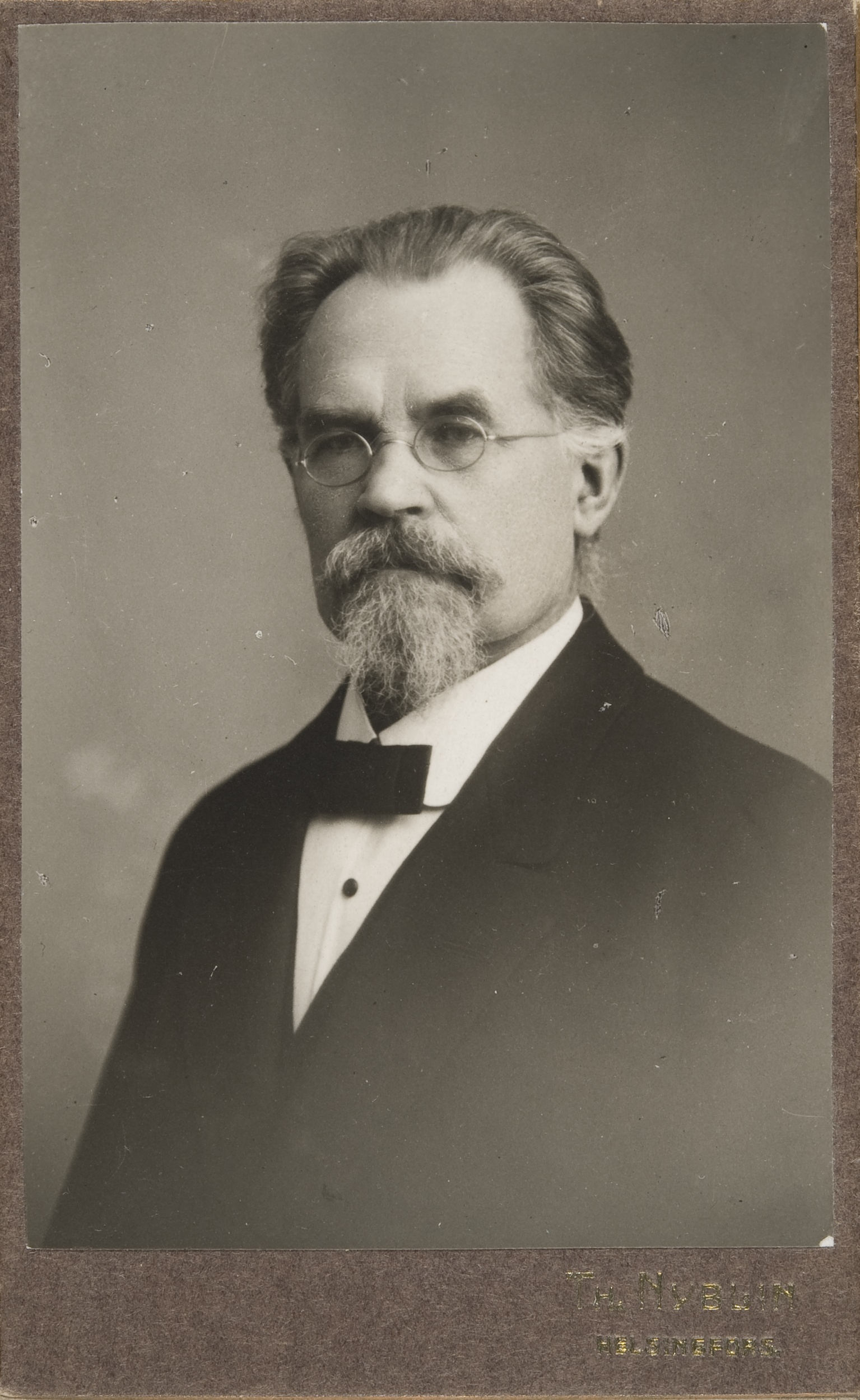
- Axel Olai Heikel c.1900. Credit: Thorvald Nyblin
- Born: April 28, 1851; Brändö, Grand Duchy of Finland, Russian Empire
- Died: April 28, 1924 (aged 72); Helsinki, Finland
- Other name: Russian: Аксель Олай Гейкель
- Citizenship: Grand Duchy of Finland
- Education: University of Helsinki
- Spouse: Maria Castrén (m. 1890)
- Children: 5
- Parents: Carl Henrik Heikel (father); Emma Fredrika Heikel (mother)
- Relatives: Anna Heikel, Felix Heikel, Ivar Heikel, Viktor Heikel
- Scientific career
- Fields: History

Axel Olai Heikel (April 28, 1851 – September 6, 1924) was a Finnish ethnographer and archaeologist, and cousin of Viktor, Felix, Anna, and Ivar Heikel. He is one of the founders of ethnology in Finland.

== Biography ==
Heikel was born on April 28, 1851, in Brändö, Åland, Finland, to vicar Carl Henrik and Emma Fredrika Heikel née Wallin.

He received his master's degree in 1880 from the Imperial Alexander University (today the University of Helsinki). From 1889 to 1892, Heikel was an associate professor of Finnish ethnography in Helsinki; in 1893 he became curator of the Archaeological Commission and in 1917 of the Ethnographic Museum of Seurasaari, which was his creation. He was awarded the honorary title of professor (Professor's name) in 1920.

Heikel studied Estonian, Volga Finnic, and Finnish architecture. Between 1883 and 1886 and 1889 and 1893 he undertook extensive ethnographic and archaeological research trips to Finno-Ugric tribes, including the Mari, Mordvin and Udmurt people, in Russia. He also made trips to Mongolia, Siberia, and Karelia. In 1893, Heikel became the first to discover traces of the Andronovo culture near Yalutorovsk. His doctoral thesis from these trips received a mixed reaction in Finland but was widely read in Germany and Russia. Heikel was inspired by Finnish archaeologist J. R. Aspelin.

He founded the Seurasaari Open-Air Museum in Helsinki, Finland, which he "considered his second home", after being inspired by Swedish folklorist Arthur Hazelius' open-air museum Skansen in Stockholm. His goal was to create a "miniature Finland" featuring buildings moved there representing different parts of the country. He became the museum's curator in 1917.

Heikel died on September 6, 1924, in Helsinki, Finland, after a long illness. He was buried at the Old Karuna Church on the museum grounds.

Heikel was one of the University of Helsinki Faculty of Arts' 375 Humanists on March 14, 2015.

== Family ==
Heikel married Maria Castrén in 1890. They had five children: Aili Martta Oilokai Heikel, Elsa Arna Jyrhämä, Maija Kaarina Bärlund-Karma, Kerttu Annikki Heikel, and Siiri Kyllikki Nordlund.

== Works ==
- Kertomus muinaisjäännöksistä Hauhon kihlakunnassa (1878) OCLC 58321414
- Kansatieteellinen sanasto kuvien kanssa Vähäinen alku-koetus muutamien Kalevassa mainittujen esineitten selittämiseksi (1885) OCLC 58271910
- Rakennukset tšeremisseillä, mordvalaisilla, virolaisilla ja suomalaisilla (thesis, 1887) OCLC 1073828597
  - Die Gebäude der Tscheremissen, Mordwinen, Esten und Finnen (1888) OCLC 250969906
- Ethnographische Forschungen auf dem Gebiete der finnischen Völkerschaften (1888) OCLC 250969619
- Inscriptions de l'Orkhon : Recueillies par l'expédition finnoise 1890 (1892) OCLC 1154297106
- Antiquités de la Sibérie occidentale, conservées dans les musées de Tomsk, de Tobolsk, de Tumeń, d'Ékatérinebourg, de Moscou et d'Helsingfors (1894) OCLC 1077963825
- Mordvalaisten pukuja ja kuoseja/Trachten und Muster der Mordvinen (1896) OCLC 7041312
- Kiviajan ja varhemman rautaajan löydöt Lohjalla (1898) OCLC 319997020
- Vero- ja maanomistusoloista Venäjällä (presentation, 1899) OCLC 58330561
- Eräitä kiinalaisia rahoja (1906) OCLC 251375540
- Die Volkstrachten in den Ostseeprovinzen und in Setukesien (1909) OCLC 26054301
- The Fölisö Open-air Museum (1912) OCLC 1301242510
- Niemelän torppa Konginkankaalta ja Seurasaarella (1912) OCLC 839843540
- Die Grabuntersuchungen und Funde bei Tashebá (1912) OCLC 1125030662
- Maalahtelainen karjamaja, Ekkeröläinen postipursi, Ahvenanmaalainen juannussalko, Karunan kirkko, Paltamolainen tervavene, Inarilainen lappalaisteltta, Florinin huvimaja (1913) OCLC 839843503
- Karunan kirkon muutto Seurasaarelle (1913) OCLC 58260630
- Niemelän rakennukset (1914) OCLC 839843710
- Die Stickmuster der Tscheremissen (1915) OCLC 7491956
- Brunnsparkens historia 1834-1886 (1919) OCLC 247510932
- Aleksis Kiven tupa, Tuulimylly Punkalaitumelta, Karjalan tuvat Kaukolasta, Paja Espoosta, Tallirakennus Kaivopuistosta Helsingissä (1919) OCLC 839843580
- Karunan Kirkko (1922) OCLC 934475970

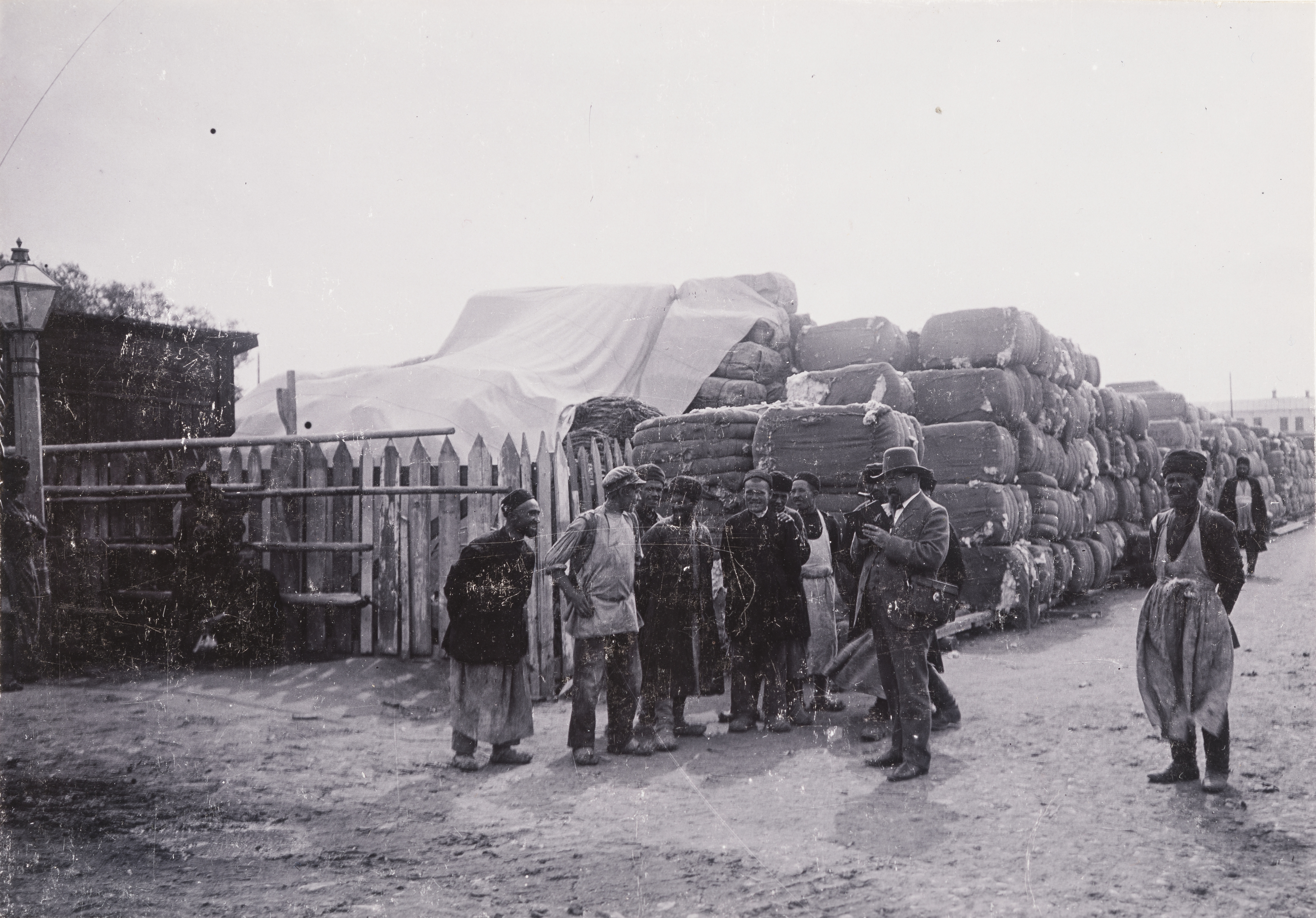
Heikel taking notes in Nizhny Novgorod, Russia, in 1903.

== See also ==
- Ingala Valley
- Finno-Ugrian Society
