= Viktor Heikel =

Finnish gymnastics teacher (1842–1927)

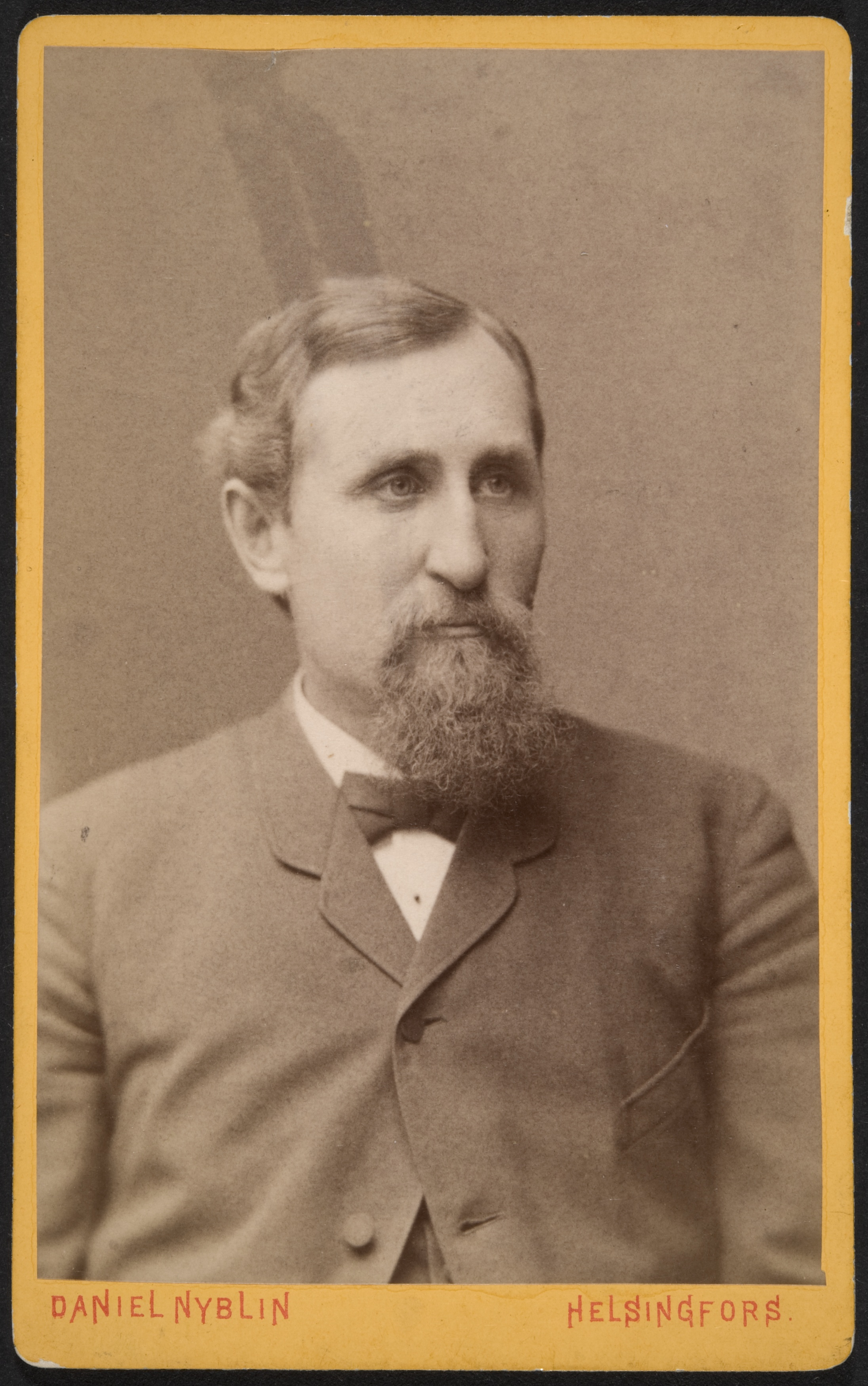
- Viktor Heikel in the 1880s. Credit: Daniel Nyblin
- Born: 23 August 1842; Turku, Grand Duchy of Finland, Russian Empire
- Died: 27 July 1927 (aged 84); Porvoon maalaiskunta, Finland
- Occupations: Gymnastics teacher, educator, writer
- Known for: "Father of Finnish school gymnastics"; contributions to the Baptist church in Finland
- Movement: Baptist
- Spouse: Hanna Kihlman (m. 1873)
- Children: Yngvar Heikel; Allan Phayllos Heikel
- Parents: Henrik Heikel (father); Wilhelmina Johanna Schauman (mother)
- Relatives: 10 siblings, including: Felix Heikel; Anna Heikel

Frans Viktor Heikel (23 August 1842 – 27 July 1927) was a Finland-Swedish gymnastics teacher, known as "the father of Finnish school gymnastics".

== Life ==
Heikel was born in Turku to educator and priest Henrik Heikel and Wilhelmina Johanna Schauman. He had ten siblings, including brother Felix Heikel (1844–1921), a bank manager and politician and sister Anna Heikel, head of the School for the Deaf. In 1873 Heikel married Hanna Kihlman. He was father to doctor Allan Phayllos Heikel (born 1885) and ethnologist Yngvar Heikel (born 1889). He was also cousin to ethnographer Axel Heikel and philologist Ivar Heikel.

Between 1867 and 1869 Heikel studied gymnastics in Stockholm and Germany. In 1869 he became a teacher of gymnastics at the Svenska normallyceum i Helsingfors (Swedish Normal School in Helsinki), and in 1873 a lecturer in gymnastics at the Nykarleby Seminary. From 1876 to 1911 he was senior lecturer in gymnastics at the University of Helsinki. He was awarded the title of professor in 1907 and was promoted to honorary doctor of medicine in 1919. Heikel helped found and taught at the Nya svenska samskolan, a private co-educational school in Helsinki, in 1888.

He developed a system based on Swedish and German gymnastics that reformed Finnish gymnastics. He was also interested in swimming, rowing and athletics. He was opposed to modern sports with its specialization, competitiveness and pursuit of records, while Artur Eklund, in a polemic with Heikel, expressed himself pejoratively about gymnastics.

Heikel participated extensively in the cultural and social endeavours of the time. In the 1860s, together with his sister Anna Heikel, he helped introduce the Baptist church to Finland. Critical of the Evangelical Lutheran Church of Finland, he supported the foundation of the Association for Religious Freedom and Tolerance in Finland (Swedish: Föreningen för religionsfrihet och tolerans i Finland, Finnish: Suomen uskonvapaus ja suvaitsevaisuusyhdistys) in 1887; he was also involved in the Prometheus student society which campaigned for freedom of religion.

Heikel died 27 July 1927 in Porvoon maalaiskunta, Finland.

== Works ==
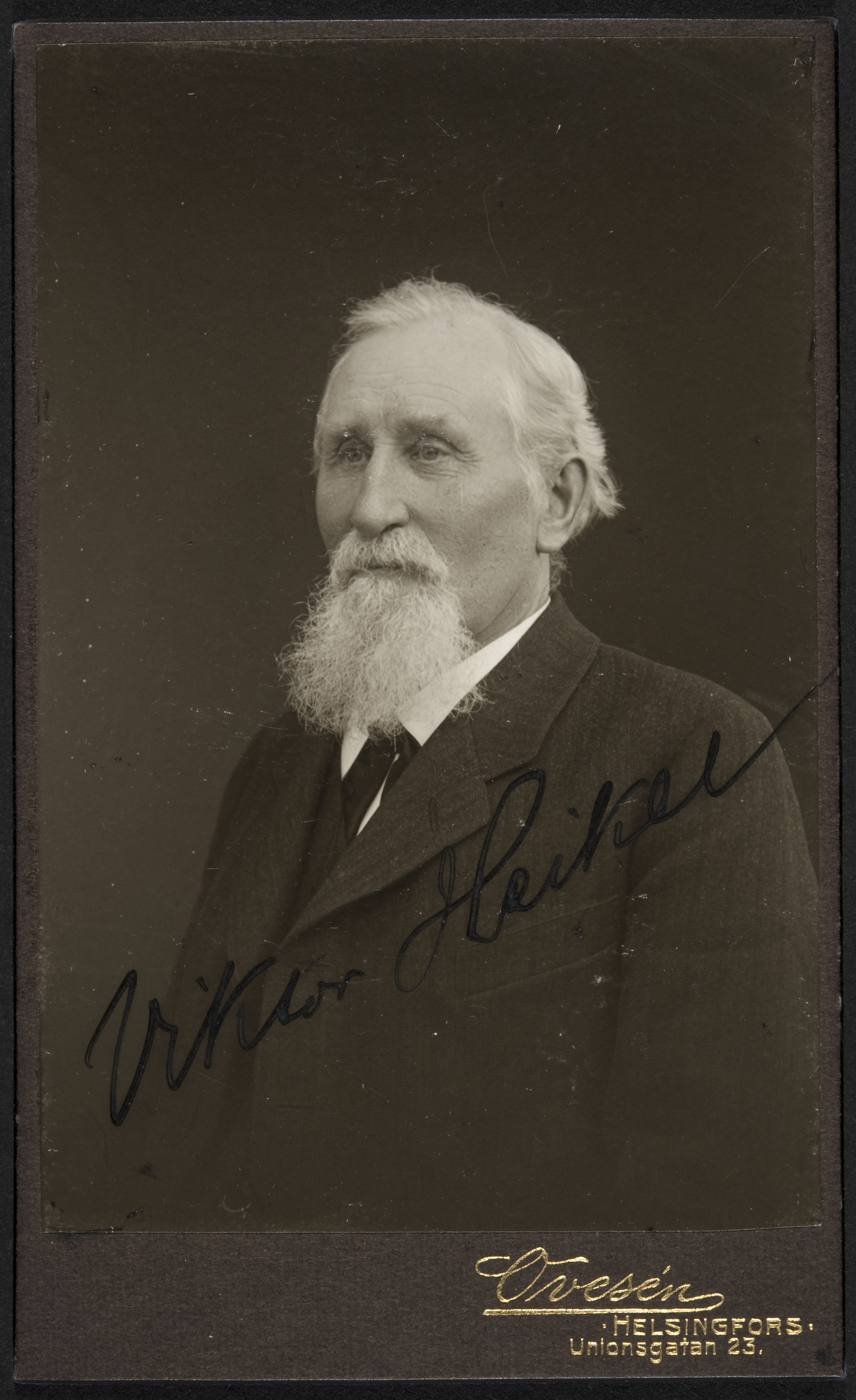
Heikel after retirement in 1911. Credit: Ernst Ovesén

=== In Swedish ===
- Den högkyrkliga pessimismen. Helsinki 1888.
- Hvad vilja dissenters. Helsinki 1888.
- Gymnastiska friöfningar med och utan jernstaf, för skolor, hem och föreningar, ordnade i tabeller. Second revised edition, Holm, Helsinki 1889.
- Hemgymnastik på "Palästron". Helsinki 1891.
- Hygianten eller "Hälsopumpen". Helsinki 1892.
- Hälsoråd tillegnade den mognare skolungdomen. Helsinki 1893.
- Hvad felas vårt Uppfostringssystem? Ett uttalande af V. Heikel. Helsinki 1894.
- Gymnastikens teori enligt V. Heikels föreläsningar 1–2. Notes by E. Cannelin. Helsinki 1895.
- Gymnastiska muskeltabeller. Helsinki 1895.
- Våra sjömän. Helsinki 1898.
- Fria tankar om gymnastik, idrott och kroppsarbete. Helsinki 1900.
- Idrott, men ej rekordjakt! Ett upprop till våra gymnastik- och idrotts-föreningen. Helsinki 1903.
- Gymnastikens teori. Helsinki 1904, second revised and extended edition, Söderström, Helsinki 1915.
- Idrott: I frågan om profven för idrottsmagister- och kandidatgraden. Helsinki 1904.
- Japansk gymnastik. Helsinki 1904.
- Gymnastikens historia: Förra delen. Helsinki 1905.
- Gymnastikens historia: Senare delens första häfte. Helsinki 1906.
- Gymnastikens historia: Senare delens andra häfte. Helsinki 1907.
- Leading Principles of Schoolgymnastics. Helsinki 1908.
- Gymnastikens historia: Senare delens tredje (sista) häfte. Helsinki 1909.
- Håll dig ung: Några vinkar om hälsosamma vanor. Helsinki 1912.
- Vidgad horisont: Fria tankar i religiösa frågor. Porvoo 1925.

=== In Finnish ===
- Kotivoimistelua "Palestron" nimisellä telineellä. WSOY 1891.
- Terveysneuvoja varttuneemmalle nuorisolle. Helsinki 1902.
- Japanilainen voimistelu. Helsinki 1905.
- Voimistelun vapaa- ja sauvaliikkeitä kouluja, koteja ja yhdistyksiä varten tauluihin järjestänyt Viktor Heikel. The second Swedish edition was translated by K. E. Levälahti with the author's permission. Karisto 1909, 2nd revised edition 1912.
- Voimistelun teoria. From the second revised and expanded edition by Uuno Suomela. WSOY 1916.
