= Jenny Markelin-Svensson =

Professional inspector (1882–1929)

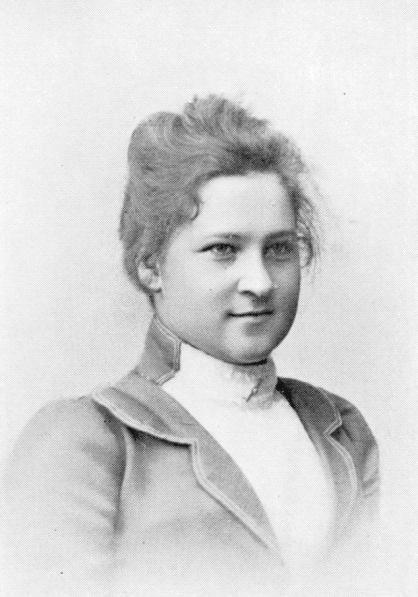
Photograph of Jenny Markelin-Svensson

Jenny Maria Gustava Markelin-Svensson (October 30, 1882, Vantaa - March 17, 1929, Helsinki) was a professional inspector and Finland's first female engineer.

Markelin-Svensson's parents were farmer Johan Fredrik Albert Markel and Amanda Fredrika Nummel. She married construction engineer Emil Svensson in 1911. She graduated from a Swedish-speaking high school "Nya svenska samskolan" in 1899. She graduated from Helsinki University of Technology in 1905 as an engineer with a focus on road and bridge construction.

After graduating, Markelin-Svensson studied working conditions in Finland and through scholarships, studied working conditions across Europe. In 1908, she was appointed Assistant Inspector to Vera Hjelt, and in 1909 she served as Assistant Inspector in Vyborg and Lahti. In 1913, she moved to Helsinki, to work as a labor inspector for the Health Care Board.

When the Social Administration was established in 1918, Markelin-Svensson served as Finland's first female occupational inspector. Later, she was the Deputy Inspector of the Ministry of Social Affairs until her early death. Markelin-Svensson was also an active social influencer, through public outreach including newsletters, presentations and lectures, as well as through her positions in industry associations and organizations.
