= J. R. Aspelin =

Finnish archaeologist (1842–1915)

J.R. Aspelin
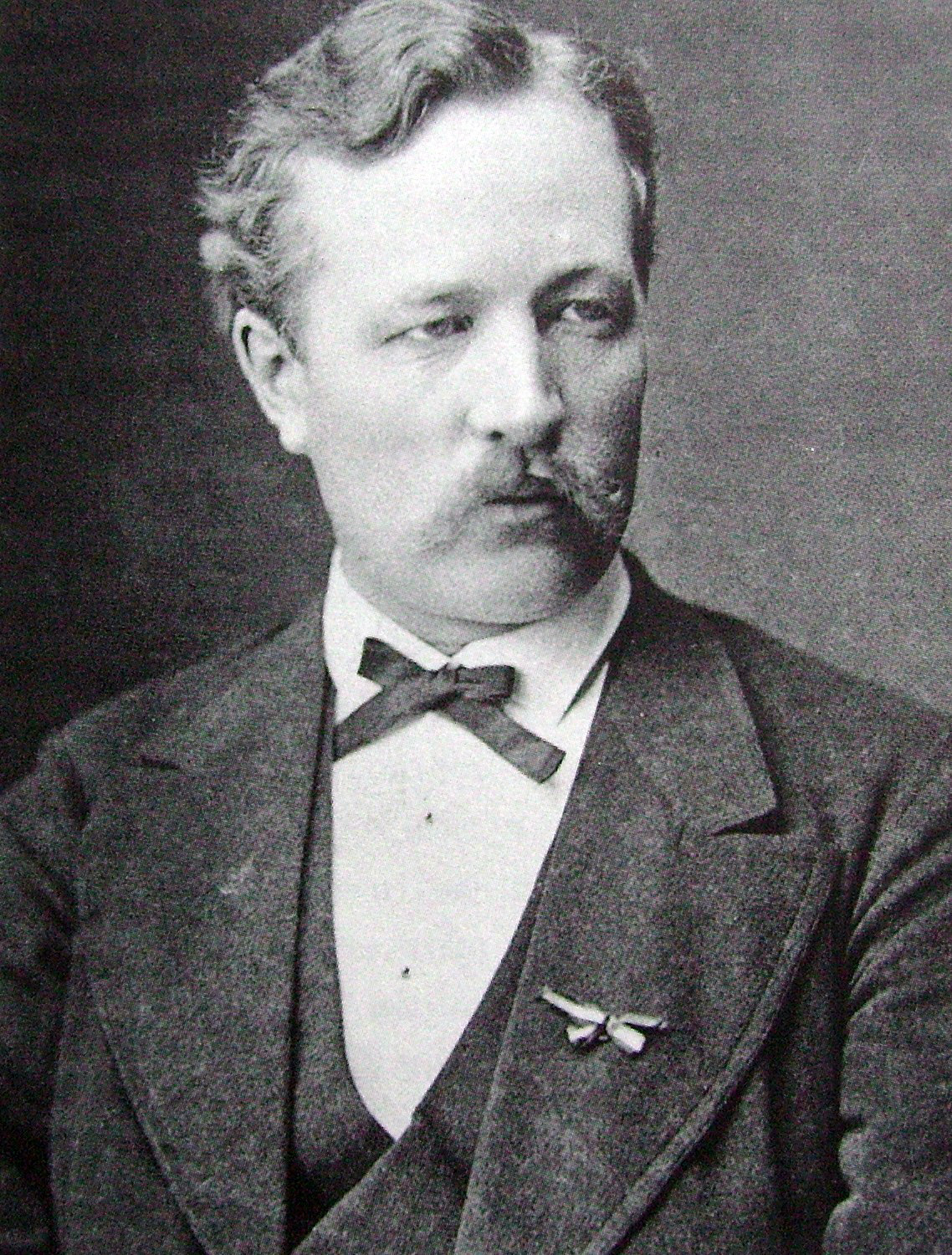
- Born: Johannes Reinhold Aspelin; August 1, 1842; Messukylä, Finland
- Died: May 29, 1915 (aged 72); Helsinki, Finland
- Occupations: Archaeologist, professor

Johannes Reinhold Aspelin (August 1, 1842 – May 29, 1915) was a Finnish archaeologist and professor who was the first state archaeologist of Finland, as well as the first professor of archaeology in Finland. He was a leading figure in the establishment of the National Museum of Finland.

His range of expertise was mainly Scandinavia and the Ural region.

== Early life ==
Aspelin was born on August 1, 1842, in Messukylä. His father was a priest and the family moved around Ostrobothnia as he moved to different churches. It was perhaps his Ostrobothnian upbringing that encouraged his interest in archaeology, as many ancient artifacts were being found by clergymen at the time. Aspelin studied history at the University of Helsinki in the mid-1860s, obtaining a Bachelor of Arts in 1866 and a Master of Arts in 1869. Aspelin travelled to Sweden and became acquainted with Oscar Montelius and his research in Scandinavian antiquities. Returning, he wanted to research Finland's ancient history.

== Career ==
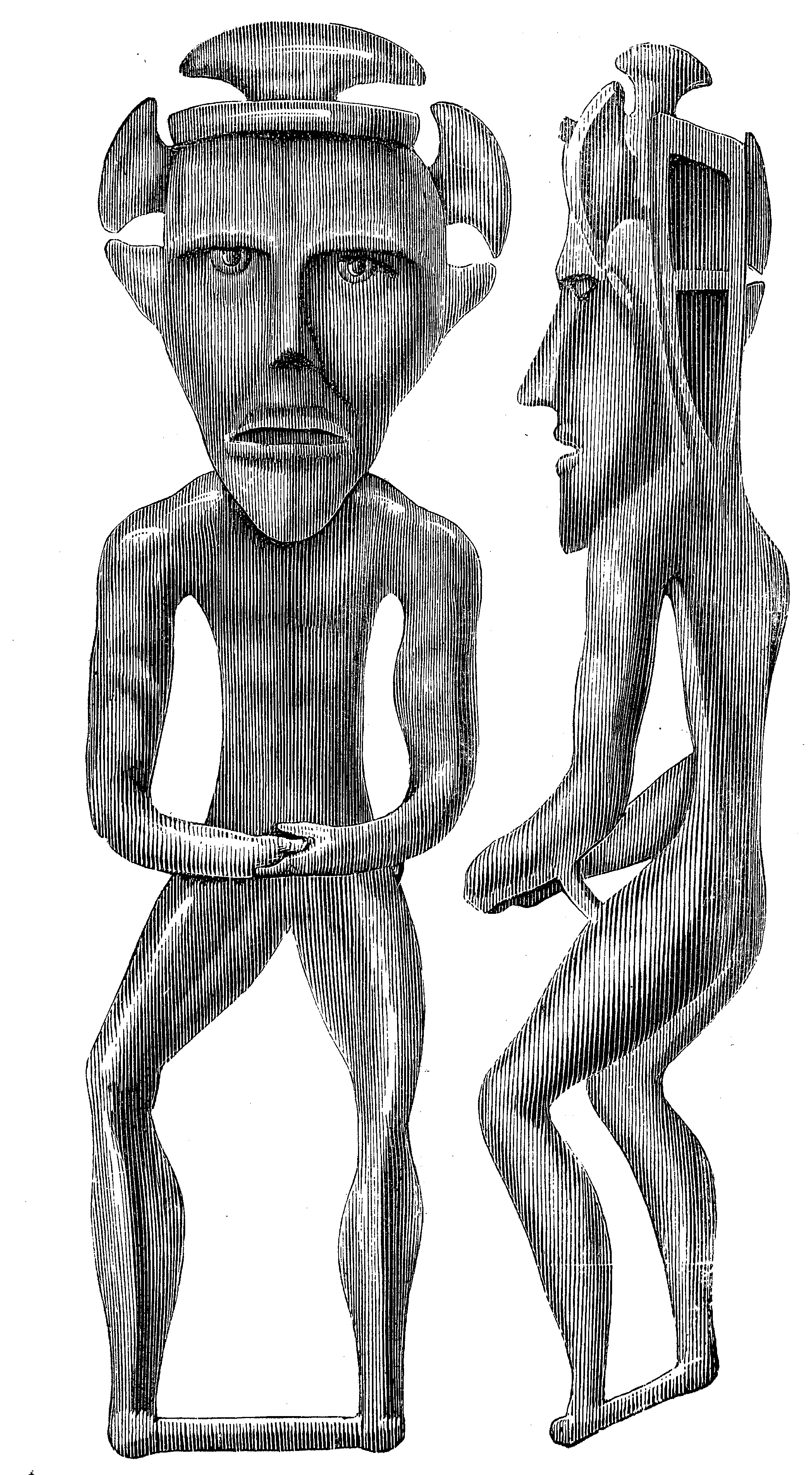
Copper figure found in the village of Varzuga by Aspelin

He graduated from the University of Moscow and conducted excavations in Russia where Finns may have lived. He then traveled to Germany, France, Poland, and the Baltics to research Finnish communities there as well. In 1875, with this research, he published his first dissertation, Suomalais-ugrilaisen muinaistutkinnon alkeita (English: Fundamentals of Finno-Ugric Antiquities). Within the book, he supported Matthias Castrén's idea that Finns came from the Altai Mountains and the steppes of the Yenisey, and migrated west towards the Urals during the Bronze Age. He also obtained a licentiate in 1876 and a PhD in 1877.

Following this dissertation and a period of editing a five-part atlas of Finnish-related settlements, he became a professor of Nordic archaeology at the University of Helsinki in 1878. He was a professor for seven and a half years and established an archaeology program at the university, with notable students including Axel Heikel and Hjalmar Appelgren-Kivalo. He wrote the first general work on prehistoric Finland in 1879. In 1883, the Senate passed an ordinance that would protect ancient monuments and the Archaeological Commission was founded to enforce this ordinance. Aspelin was appointed as the head of the commission in 1885, becoming Finland's first state archaeologist. He left his position of professor when he assumed the state archaeologist position. During a leave of absence from the commission, he travelled to the Yenisey region and discovered rock carvings, which Aspelin thought belonged to Finns during the Bronze Age. However, Vilhelm Thomsen believed the carvings were from the Turks during the Iron Age.

As archaeology developed, many of his ideas became obsolete. Influential figures such as Aarne Michaël Tallgren disproved his theories. In his old age, Aspelin wrote cultural historical and genealogical articles for Biografinen nimikirja. Nevertheless, he is regarded as a father figure for Finnish archaeology and showed that archaeology was part of the broad sense of cultural history.

== Personal life ==
Aspelin was not very involved in politics, but he sympathized with the Young Finnish Party during the Russification of Finland.

He died in Helsinki on May 29, 1915, aged 72.
