= Nya svenska samskolan =

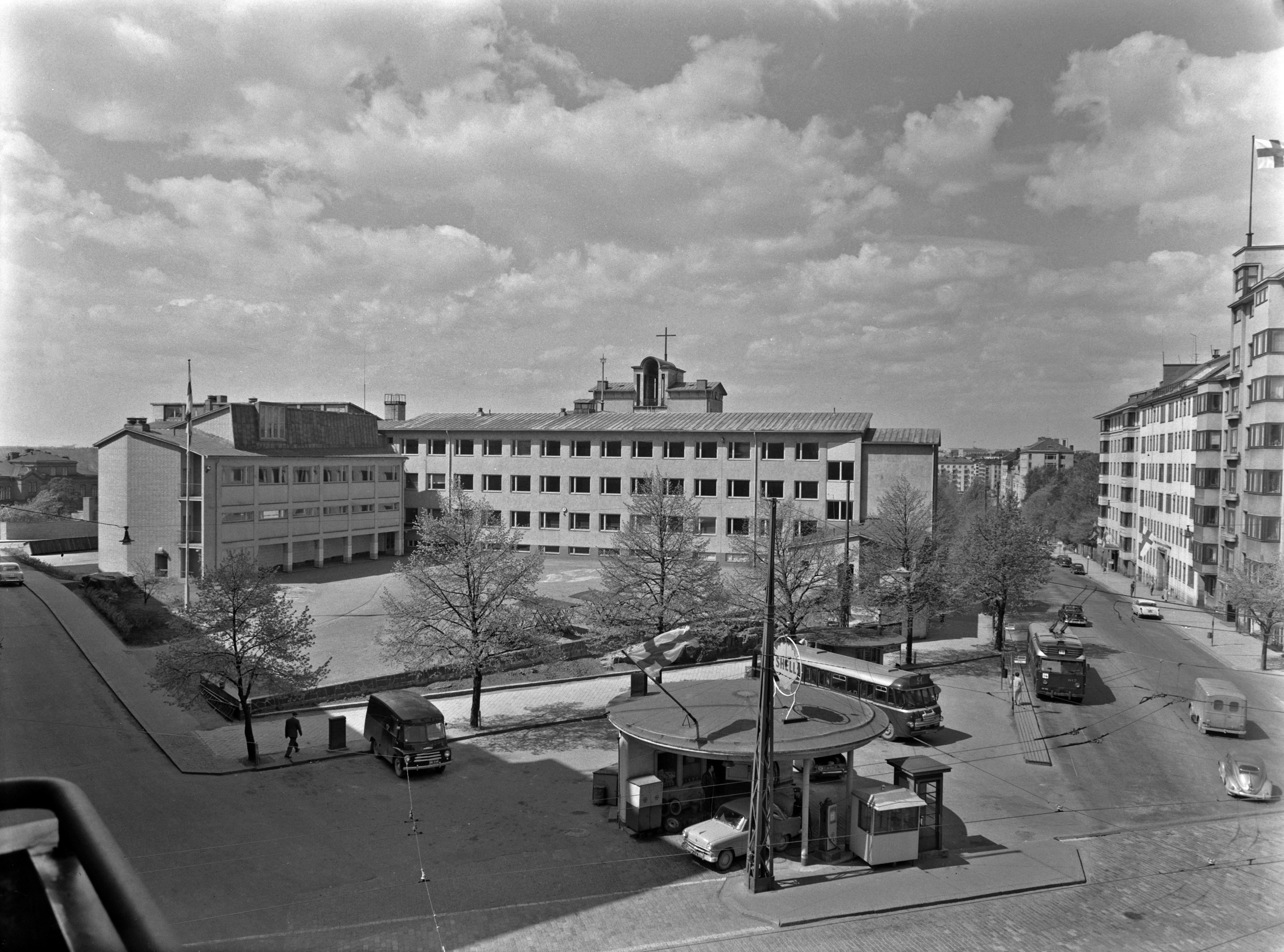
- Helsinki; Finland

Information
- School type: Private, co-educational
- Founded: 1888
- Closed: 1977

Nya svenska samskolan (also known as Lönnbeckska samskolan, Lönkan), was a Swedish-language, co-educational private educational institution in Helsinki, Finland, from 1888 to 1977.

== History ==
Nya svenska samskolan was founded in the spring of 1888 as an educational institution with nine levels. The founders were head teacher Viktor Heikel (son of educator Henrik Heikel), assessor Uno Kurtén, private teacher Helena Alfthan and philosophy master Albin Lönnbeck. Lönnbeck was the school's first principal, which gave the school its nickname Lönnbeckska school, or Lönkan.

The school was founded after a conflict among the teaching staff at Läroverket för gossar och flickor, which led to the founders breaking away and founding a new school. The school was owned by its founders from 1888 to 1899 and by the foundation Stiftelsen Nya svenska samskolan from 1899 to 1977

Lönkan was one of the leading co-educational schools in Finland during the autonomous period. The curricula was continuously developed until the Russification of Finland (1899-1905 and 1908-1917) when all curricula were aligned. During the First World War, as many as 24 of the school's students and staff joined the Jäger movement. One of them was historian Eirik Hornborg, who was the school's principal at the time.

The school began its operations in Standertskjöld's stone house at Norra kajen 4 in 1888. The following year it moved to a building owned by founder Viktor Heikel on Bulvarden 7-9. In 1911 Lönkan moved to a building on Andrégatan 12 (later Lönnrotsgatan). By the end of the 1940s, the building was in need of renovation and not big enough to accommodate the growing number of students. The City of Helsinki donated a plot of land by Tölö torg and architect Hilding Ekelund was tasked with planning a school building for 450 students. In 1954, Lönkan moved in to the brand new building on Sandelsgatan 3.

When the Finnish education system was reformed in 1977, Lönkan was split into the högstadium Högstadieskolan Lönkan and the gymnasium Lönnbeckska gymnasiet. The building on Sandelsgatan 3 has housed Tölö gymnasium since 2015.

== Principals ==
- 1888-1914 Albin Lönnbeck
- 1914-1916 Eirik Hornborg
- 1916-1917 Johannes Sundström
- 1917-1918 Eirik Hornborg
- 1918-1945 Johannes Sundström
- 1945-1965 Leo Backman
- 1965-1967 Walter von Koskull
- 1968-1973 Paul Hägglund
- 1973-1977 Boris Lönnqvist

== Famous alumni ==
- Lars Ahlfors, mathematician, remembered for his work in the field of Riemann surfaces and his text on complex analysis.
- Kaj Arnö, businessman, columnist
- Eva Biaudet, politician, former minister
- Staffan Bruun, journalist, author
- Henrik Dettmann, professional basketball coach
- Ilmi Hallsten, teacher, activist, politician
- Erik Heinrichs, military general, Finland's Chief of the General Staff during the Interim Peace and Continuation War
- Barbara Helsingius, singer, fencer
- Eirik Hornborg, politician, historian, principal, author
- Mirjam Kalland, professor
- Herman Lindqvist, journalist, author
- Birgitta Lindström, Wimbledon champion 1966
- Jenny Markelin-Svensson, Finland's first female engineer
- Yrsa Stenius, journalist, author
- Astrid Thors, politician, former minister
- Birgitta Ulfsson, actor, director
- Björn Wahlroos, businessman, investor
- Harald Öhquist, Lieutenant General during World War II
