= Vicki-Anne Heikell =

Paper conservator in New Zealand

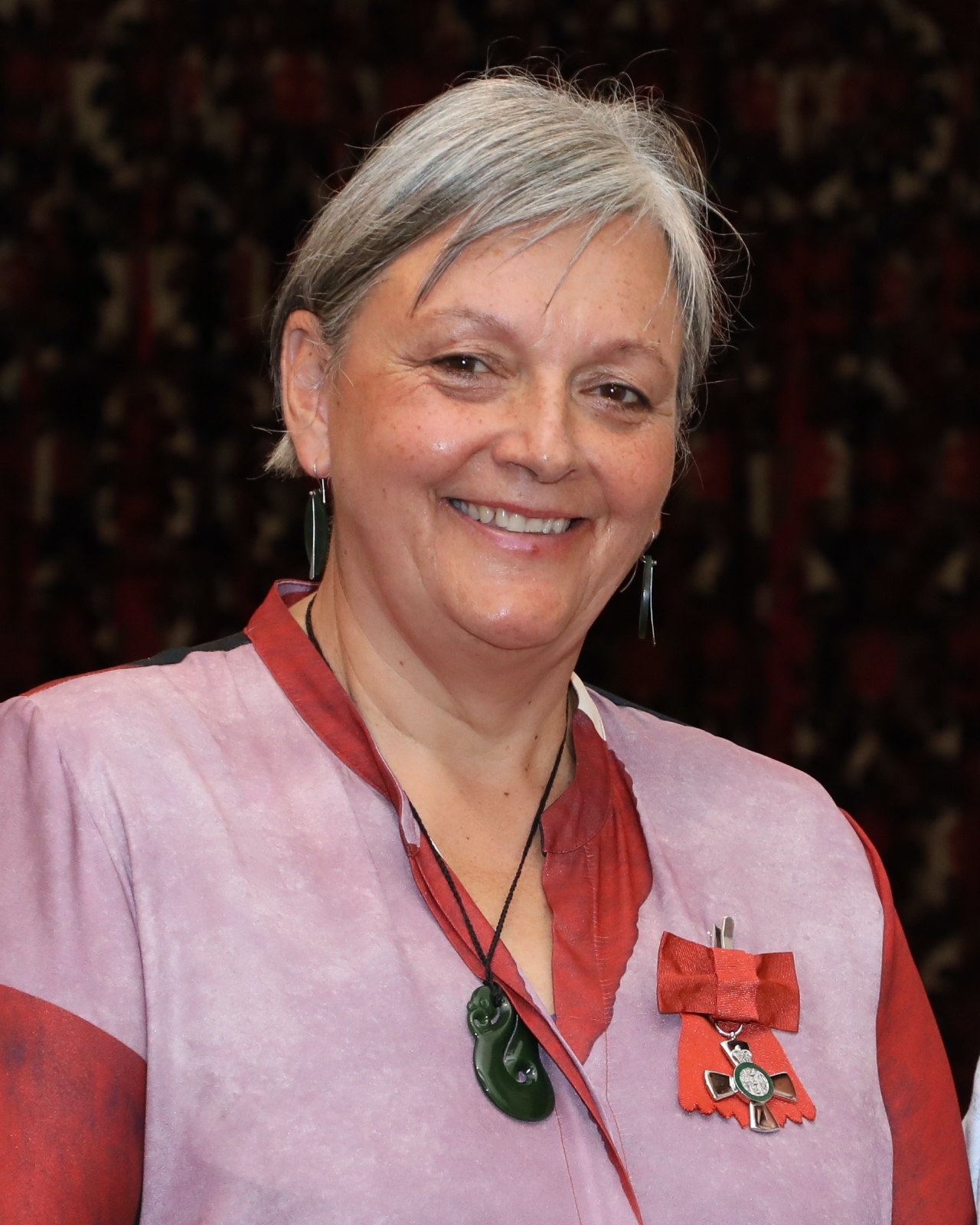
- Born: 1967; Gisborne
- Awards: Member of the New Zealand Order of Merit

Academic background
- Education: Mangapapa School, St. Mary's Catholic Primary School Gisborne, Campion College, Victoria University of Wellington, University of Canberra

Vicki-Anne Heikell MNZM is a New Zealand paper conservator, and writer. In 2021, Heikell was appointed a Member of the New Zealand Order of Merit for services to heritage preservation and Māori.

== Early life and education ==
Heikell was born in Gisborne and educated at Mangapapa School, St Mary's Catholic Primary School and Campion College. Heikell studied sociology at Victoria University of Wellington, after which she had a summer job working for NZ Historic Places (now Heritage New Zealand) doing conservation work at Porourangi Marae. She successfully applied for a scholarship from the Conservation Cultural Advisory Council, and then completed a Bachelor of Applied Science in Conservation of Cultural Materials in Canberra. Heikell has also studied at Whitireia Polytechnic, and has a Diploma and an Advanced Diploma in Creative Writing.

== Career ==
Heikell spent three years as a paper conservator at the National Library of New Zealand, from 1993. In 1997 she was appointed as National Preservation Officer, Māori at the library. She has also worked at Te Papa Tongarewa. In 1997 she received a Winston Churchill Fellowship, which she used to visit U’mista Cultural Centre in British Columbia and the Getty Museum.

Heikell has written a play, and a number of short stories.

== Honours and awards ==
In the 2021 New Year's Honours, Heikell was appointed a Member of the New Zealand Order of Merit for services to heritage preservation and Māori. In 2022, Heikell delivered the Forbes Prize lecture at the biennial congress of the International Institute for Conservation of Historic and Artistic Works.

== Selected works ==
- Vesna Zivkovic; Heikell, Vicki Anne (2022). "Harnessing indigenous knowledge in disaster risk management in Aotearoa New Zealand". Libellarium: Journal for the Research of Writing, Books, and Cultural Heritage Institutions. 13 (1): 31–44. doi:10.15291/libellarium.3474. Wikidata Q114132863.
- Heikell, Vicki-Anne (4 August 2023). "Iwi Archivist Symposium, Te Pūranga". natlib.govt.nz.
