= Vesa Heikinheimo =

Finnish footballer (born 1983)

Personal information
- Date of birth: 10 May 1983 (age 43)
- Height: 1.85 m (6 ft 1 in)
- Position: Defender

Team information
- Current team: FF Jaro
- Number: 4

Vesa Heikinheimo (born 10 May 1983) is a Finnish footballer who currently plays for the Veikkausliiga side FF Jaro. He has also represented FC Honka and FC Hämeenlinna earlier in his career.

== Career ==
Heikinheimo played for TPS in the Veikkausliiga before suffering a knee injury in 2003. After recovering, TPS sent him on loan to 3rd division side KaaPo for the 2004 season.
