= Henrik Heikel =

Finnish priest (1808–1867)

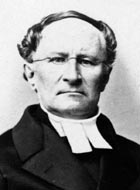
- Henrik Heikel, before 1868
- Born: 14 January 1808; Oulu, Grand Duchy of Finland, Russian Empire
- Died: 14 March 1867 (aged 59); Helsinki, Grand Duchy of Finland, Russian Empire
- Occupations: Lutheran priest, educator
- Notable work: Lärobok i geometrien
- Spouse: Wilhelmina Johanna Schauman
- Children: 11, including: Viktor Heikel, gymnastics teacher and educator; Felix Heikel, banker and politician; Anna Heikel, educator and head of school for the deaf

Henrik Heikel (14 January 1808 – 14 March 1867) was a Finland-Swedish educator and Lutheran pastor.

== Life ==
Heikel was born in Oulu, Finland in 1808. He began his studies in 1823, receiving his master of philosophy degree in 1832. Heikel became a lecturer in philosophy and natural history at Åbo Gymnasium in Turku (Åbo) in 1835 and vicar of the Evangelical Lutheran Church of Finland in Pedersöre in 1861. Heikel took a great interest in many public affairs and held a position in the Diet of Finland in 1863–1864 and 1867. He donated funds for the establishment of a children's school in Turku. At his own expense he set up a home for the deaf in Pedersöre in 1861, which was later taken over by the state. During the last famine in Finland he lent 30,000 marks to peasants. As an educator he published Lärobok i geometrien ('Textbook in Geometry'), containing six books of Euclid's Elements and practical applications (3rd edition 1871).

Heikel married Wilhelmina Johanna Schauman and had eleven children. His children included Viktor Heikel, a gymnastics teacher and educator; Felix Heikel, a bank manager and politician; and Anna Heikel, an educator and head of the school for the deaf founded along with her father. He was also the uncle of philologist and historian Ivar Heikel and grandfather of ethnologist Yngvar Heikel.

=== Relationship with the Baptists ===
Heikel and his family also have a place in the history of the Baptists in Finland. In 1859, a number of members of the growing Baptist movement faced hearings in front of the Bishop's Chapter at the Turku Cathedral. Among the Lutheran clergy present was Heikel, who took an interest in the Baptists' beliefs and spoke to them to learn more, although he did not convert. After moving to Pedersöre in 1860, he and his family maintained a connection with the Baptists in Åland. After Heikel's death in Helsinki in 1867, both his son Viktor (co-founder of the Nya svenska samskolan) and daughter Anna were baptized in Stockholm by the Baptists. After Anna's return, she began to hold meetings and share material on Baptist teachings. The family received a visit from a Baptist pastor who had been at the hearing with Heikel ten years earlier; they held meetings and his preaching led to more conversions to the movement.

Heikel's daughter Anna was also director and teacher of the Home for the Deaf, which operated until 1932.
