= Yngvar Heikel =

Finnish ethnologist (1889–1956)

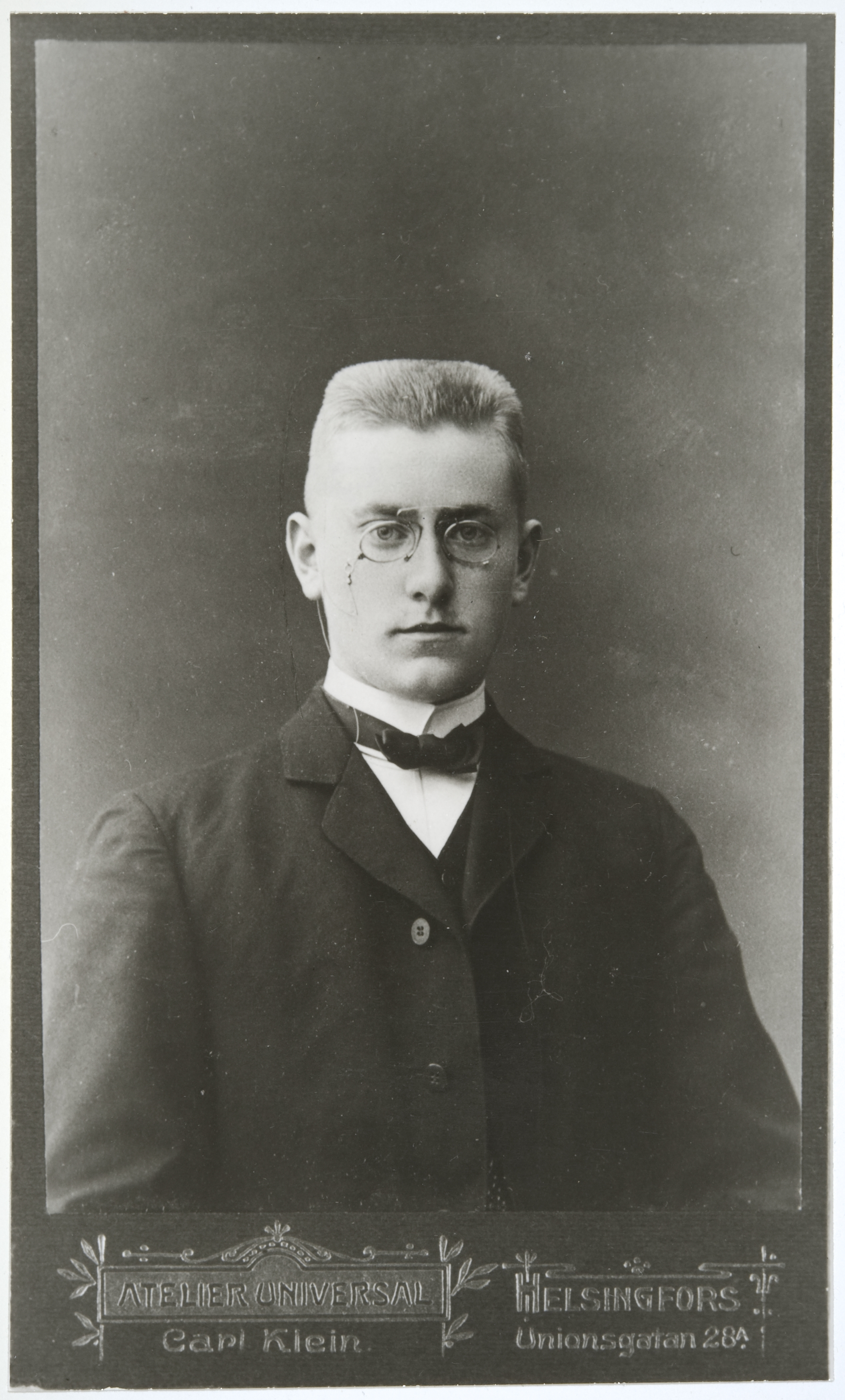
- Yngvar Heikel in 1916. Credit: Atelier Universal
- Born: 19 April 1889; Helsinki, Grand Duchy of Finland, Russian Empire
- Died: 1 September 1956 (aged 67); Helsinki, Finland
- Occupation: Ethnologist
- Father: Viktor Heikel

Yngvar Sigurd Heikel (19 April 1889 – 1 September 1956) was a Finland-Swedish ethnologist.

== Life and work ==
Heikel was born in Helsinki, Finland, in 1889 to gymnastics teacher Viktor Heikel. Among his family are aunt and uncle, Anna – an educator – and Felix Heikel – a banker – and grandfather Henrik Heikel, a priest.

He graduated with a degree in philosophy in 1915 and was a statistician at the Bank of Finland from 1921 to 1924 and from 1935. However, he is best known for his research on folk culture in Swedish-speaking Finland, especially on folk dances and folk costumes. Heikel sampled and categorized each village's form of folk costume. His work was also the main initiator of the founding of the Brage Costume Museum. He also charted the connection between living conditions and disease in different areas.

He was secretary of the Brage Association, founded by musicologist Otto Andersson, from 1916 and director of its costume bureau and village costume museum from 1923. He participated in the founding of the Finland Swedish Folk Dance Association and was its president from 1946 to 1955. He contributed to the collection Finlands svenska folkdiktning (volume VI:B "Dansbeskrivningar", 1938) and his work På forskningsresor i svenskbygden was published in 1986 with an introduction and commentary by Bo Lönnqvist.

Heikel died in Helsinki in 1956.

== Bibliography ==
- 36 folkdanser utgivna av Brages sektion för folkdans (in Swedish). with Roos, Thure; Rancken, Holger. Helsinki. 1915. OCLC 58252227.
- Sjuk-, ålderdoms- och invaliditetsförsäkringen i utlandet (in Swedish). Helsinki: Socialförsäkringskommittén. 1920. OCLC 58265478.
- Allmogens dräktskick i Lappfjärd och Tjöck socknar. Brages årsskrift 1920-23 (in Swedish). Helsinki. 1925.
- Kyrkornas fattiggubbar i det svenska Österbotten (in Swedish). Helsinki: Svenska Litteratursällskapets folkloristiska och etnografiska studier IV. 1929. OCLC 943155435.
- 30 folkdanser (in Swedish). Föreningen Brage. Helsinki: Brage. 1931. OCLC 1001603844.
- Textilredskap i Korsnäs (in Swedish). Budkavlen. 1934. OCLC 943151744.
- Dräktskicket i Korsnäs (in Swedish). Helsinki: Svenska litteratursällskapets folkloristiska och Etnografiska studier. 1934. OCLC 474421906.
- Dansbeskrivningar. Finlands svenska Folkdiktning (in Swedish). Helsinki: Svenska litteratursällskapet i Finland. 1938. OCLC 4667978.
- Industrins utveckling i Finland åren 1937-1944: en undersökning på basen av företagens bokslutsiffror (in Swedish). Helsinki: Akademiska Bokhandeln. 1947. OCLC 484001874.
- Östra Nyland: Pyttis, Strömfors, Lappträsk, Pernå, Liljendal, Mörskom, Borgå och Sibbo. Svensk-Finlands bygdedräkter (in Swedish). Vol. 1. Brages förlag. 1952. OCLC 602293990.
- Mellersta Nyland och delar av Västra Nyland: Tusby, Helsinge, Esbo, Kyrkslätt, Sjundeå, Ingå, Degerby och Lojo. Svensk-Finlands bygdedräkter (in Swedish). Vol. 2. Helsinki: Brages förlag. 1955. OCLC 602294584.
- Österbotten 1, Sydligaste Österbotten : Sideby, Lappfjärd, Tjöck, Närpes och Övermark. Svensk-Finlands bygdedräkter (in Swedish). Vol. 8. Helsinki: Brages förlag. 1956. OCLC 602294612.
- Brage 50 år (in Swedish). Helsinki: Brages förlag. 1956. OCLC 58114719.
- Västra delen av västra Nyland: Snappertuna, Karis-Svartå, Pojo, Ekenäs, Tenala och Bromarv. Svensk-Finlands bygdedräkter (in Swedish). Vol. 3. Helsinki: Brages förlag. 1957. OCLC 185541634.
- Åboland: Kimito, Finby, Västanfjärd, Dragsfjärd, Hitis (Kyrkosundsskär), Pargas, Nagu, Korpo, Houtskär, Iniö. Svensk-Finlands bygdedräkter (in Swedish). Vol. 4–5. Helsinki: Brages förlag. 1961. OCLC 185541666.
- Åland: Finström, Jomala, Geta, Saltvik, Sund, Lemland, Lumparland, Vårdö, Hammarland, Eckerö, Föglö, Sottunga, Kökar, Kumlinge, Brändö. Svensk-Finlands bygdedräkter (in Swedish). Vol. 6–7. Helsinki: Brages förlag. 1966. OCLC 185541623.
- Norra delen av svenska Österbotten: Karleby, Öja, Nedervetil, Terjärv, Kronoby. Svensk-Finlands bygdedräkter (in Swedish). Vol. 12. Helsinki: Brages förlag. 1978. ISBN 9789519224015.
- Pedersöre-Nykarleby-trakten: Larsmo, Pedersöre, Esse, Purmo, Nykarleby, Socklot, Jeppo och Munsala. Svensk-Finlands bygdedräkter (in Swedish). Vol. 11. Helsinki: Brages förlag. 1986. ISBN 9789519224084.
- På forskningsresor i svenskbygden (in Swedish). Helsinki: Brages förlag. 1986. ISBN 9789519224077.
