= Felix Heikel =

Finnish politician (1844–1921)

Karl Felix Heikel
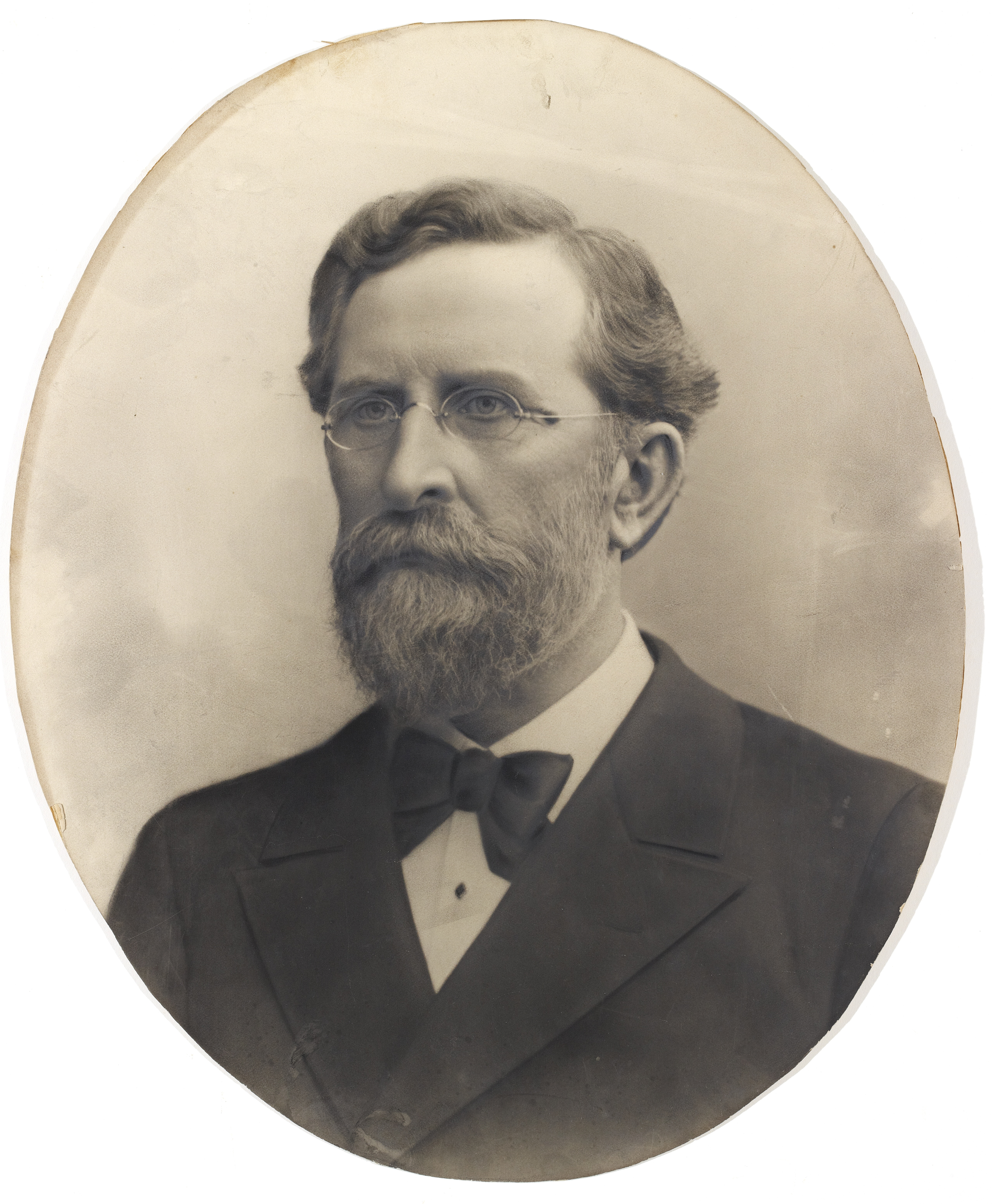
- Born: 3 June 1844; Turku, Grand Duchy of Finland, Russian Empire
- Died: 20 May 1921 (aged 76); Helsinki, Finland
- Occupations: Banker, politician
- Spouse: Sigrid Johanna Lovisa Furuhjelm (m. 1874)
- Parents: Henrik Heikel (father); Wilhelmina Johanna Schauman (mother)
- Relatives: Viktor Heikel (brother); Anna Heikel (sister)

Karl Felix Heikel (3 June 1844 – 20 May 1921) was a Finland-Swedish banker and politician. He was the son of priest and educator Henrik Heikel, brother of educators and Finnish Baptist pioneers Viktor and Anna Heikel, father of insurance director Estrid Hult, cousin of ethnographer Axel Heikel and philologist Ivar Heikel, and uncle of ethnologist Yngvar Heikel.

== Life ==
Heikel was born on 3 June 1844 in Turku, Finland to Henrik and Wilhelmina Johanna Heikel née Schauman. He had ten siblings. Heikel began his studies in 1862 and received his bachelor of philosophy in 1868. He devoted himself to the educational path and made trips to Scandinavia, Germany and North America to study public schooling (Volksschule), publishing his letters in the newspaper Hufvudstadsbladet. He later married Sigrid Johanna Lovisa Furuhjelm. In 1881 he became director of the commercial institute in Raahe and in 1892 he joined the board of the Nordic Investment Bank in Vyborg (since 1907 in Helsinki).

He was an active municipal councillor and also participated in political life, where, as a member of the Riksdag of the Estates from 1882 to 1906, he held an influential position due to his thorough knowledge and moderate attitude. Heikel was Speaker for the Bourgeoisie Assembly in the 1901 Diet of Finland. He belonged to the Swedish People's Party of Finland.

Heikel published a number of pamphlets on political and economic issues, including Finlands bank- och penningeväsen ('The Banking and Monetary System of Finland') (1888).

Heikel died on 20 May 1921 in Helsinki, Finland.

== Works ==
- Från Förenta Staterna: Nitton bref jemte bihang. Hufvudstadsbladet, Helsinki 1873, new edition of Hufvudstadsbladet, Helsinki 1973
- Yhdysvalloista: Yhdeksäntoista kirjettä liitteineen. J. Häggman and S. Hirvonen, Joensuu 1876
- Om allmänt välstånd. Lättfattliga föreläsningar för arbetare 4. 1876
- Om priset och arbetslönen. Lättfattliga föreläsningar för arbetare 5. 1876
- Om myntet samt olika slag af Spar- och lånekassor. Lättfattliga föreläsningar för arbetare 6. 1877
- Centralt eller moderat? Politisk flygskrift af. F. H. Beijer, Helsinki 1886
- Johan och Baltzar Fellman: Minnesteckning. Oulu 1887
- Vid möten och sammanträden: En kort handledning. Edlund, Helsinki 1887
- Lyhykäinen johdatus kokouksien ja istuntojen pitämiseen. Edlund, Helsinki 1887
- Finlands bank- och penningeväsen: Ett bidrag till belysande af den ekonomiska utvecklingen åren 1809-1887. Edlund, Helsinki 1888
- Vårt nya statsskick. Politiska ströskrifter 1. Helsinki 1918
- Nordiska aktiebanken för handel och industri 1872–1919. Nordiska aktiebanken, Helsinki 1922
- Pohjoismaiden osakepankki kauppaa ja teollisuutta varten. Helsinki 1922
