= Eva Heikinheimo =

Finnish politician

Evy (Eva) Maria Heikinheimo (4 August 1879 – 22 February 1955; surname until 1906 Heikel) was a Finnish secondary school teacher, school director and politician, born in Rovaniemi. She was a member of the Parliament of Finland from 1925 to 1927, representing the National Progressive Party.
