= Anna Heikel =

Finnish educator and Baptist pioneer (1838–1907)

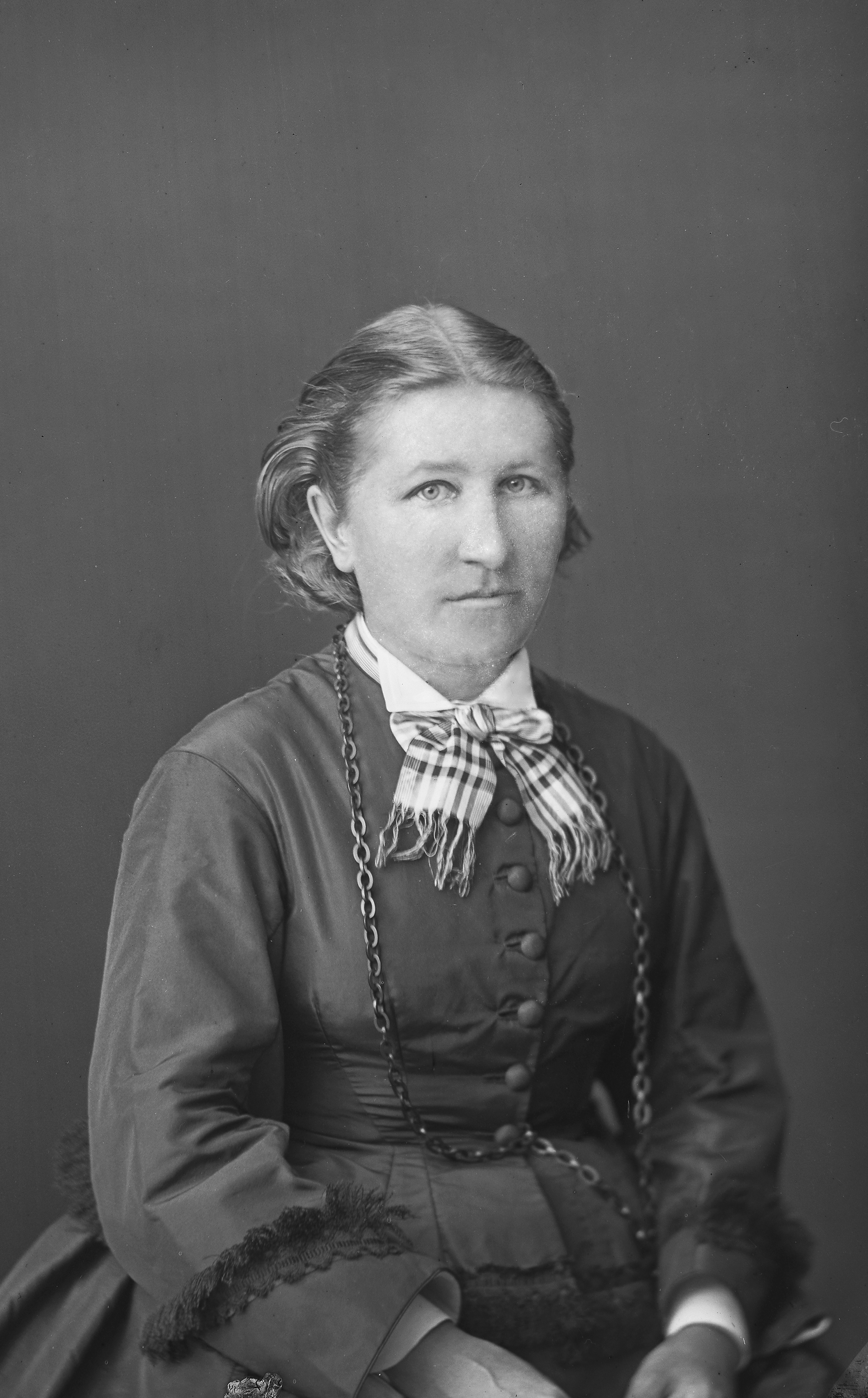
- Anna Heikel, 20 August 1877; Credit: Daniel Nyblin
- Born: 2 February 1838; Turku, Grand Duchy of Finland, Russian Empire
- Died: 3 April 1907 (aged 69); Jakobstad, Grand Duchy of Finland, Russian Empire
- Occupation: Educator
- Known for: Education of the deaf, contributions to the Baptist church in Finland, founding an early Sunday school, temperance work
- Movement: Baptist, temperance movement
- Parents: Henrik Heikel (father); Wilhelmina Johanna Schauman (mother)

Anna Charlotta Heikel (2 February 1838 – 3 April 1907) was a Finland-Swedish teacher and director of the School for the Deaf in Jakobstad, Finland, from 1878 to 1898. She was a temperance activist as well as a pioneer of the Baptist movement in Finland and early Sunday school founder.

== Upbringing and education ==
Heikel was born in Turku, Finland, on 2 February 1838 to Lutheran priest and educator Henrik Heikel. She was one of 11 children, among them gymnastics teacher and educator, Viktor Heikel, and Felix Heikel, a banker and politician. Ethnologist Yngvar Heikel was her nephew.

From 1848 to 1853, she attended the Svenska fruntimmersskolan i Åbo, a girls' school in Turku.

At 22 years old, Anna Heikel did an internship with the "apostle to the Deaf", Carl Henrik Alopaeus, in Turku. Alopaeus was a bishop and headmaster of the school for the deaf in Turku, and also conducted research on teaching the deaf. They would continue to work together for many years, also later traveling to the area of Lappmarken in the summer of 1866, where they instructed the deaf. Heikel became the first female teacher for the deaf in Finland. She worked voluntarily for many years without receiving pay.

== School for the Deaf ==
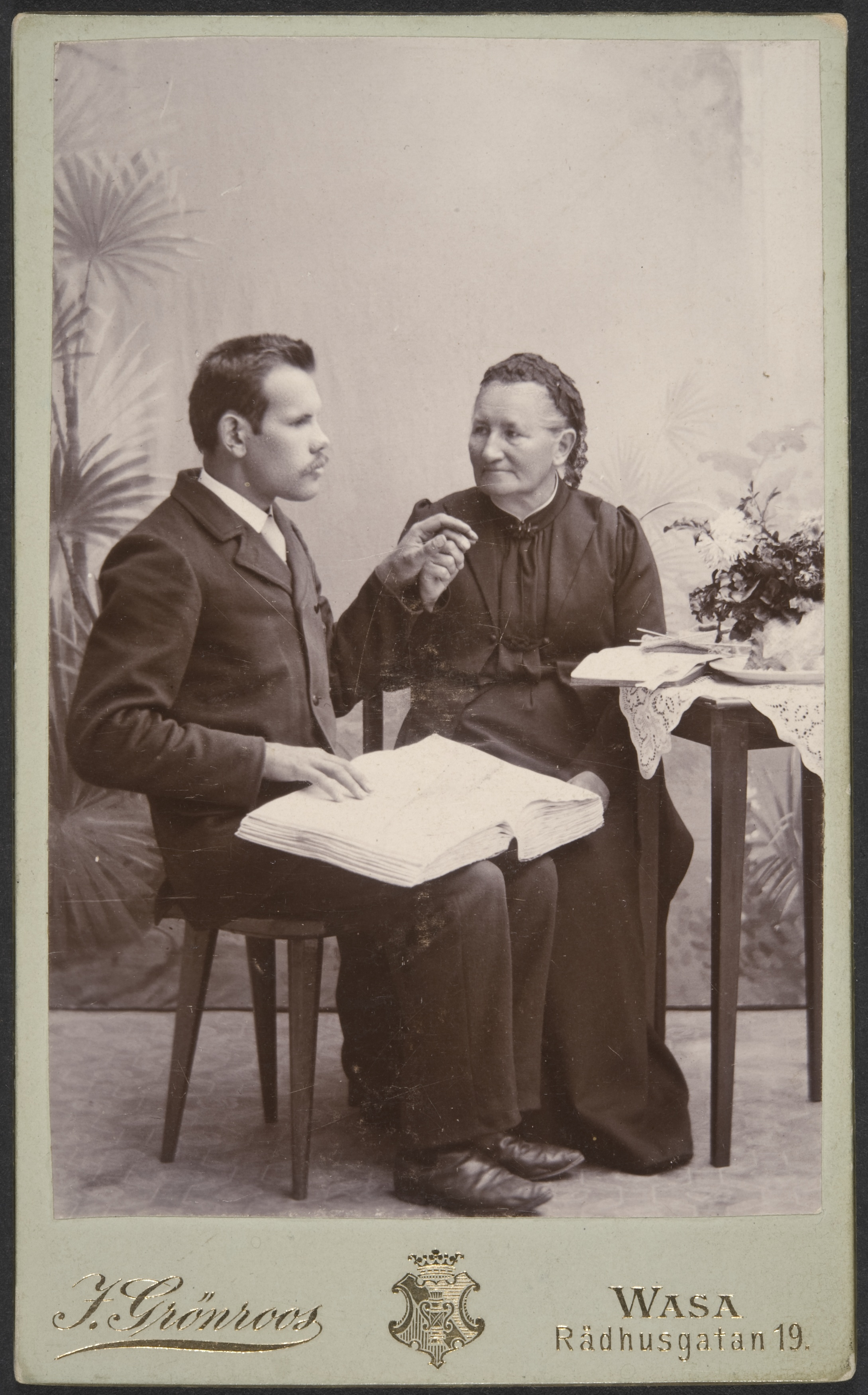
Anna Heikel with student Frans Leijon in the 1890s. Credit: Jakob (?) Grönroos

After the family moved from Turku to Pedersöre in 1861, Heikel and her father founded a school for the deaf the same year on the rectory property at his expense; her sister also taught there. According to Dövas Församlingsblad, "Anna and her sister Selma were responsible for teaching in the beginning before a deaf teacher, Lorentz Eklund, was hired. Anna then also served as director of the school." The school was visited by Alopaeus a year later, who noted a great need in the area. Around this time, Heikel and her brother Viktor also studied folk schools in Stockholm. A separate building was built in 1863; the school's operations were also taken over by the state that year. The school had over one hundred students in the early 1880s. Due to a lack of space, it was moved to nearby Jakobstad in 1887 and became a boarding school. The school was eventually closed in 1932.

=== Educational methods ===
Along with the school for the deaf in Porvoo (Swedish: Borgå), which operated from 1846 to 1991, it was one of two schools for the deaf for the Swedish-speaking minority in Finland. At a time when oralism was common in deaf education, Heikel did not support its use but rather supported the use of sign language. The school in Jakobstad (Finnish: Pietarsaari) took in students from the school in Porvoo who had not learned spoken Swedish. There they were educated in Finland-Swedish sign language and written Swedish.

== Contribution to the Baptist movement ==
Together with her family and others, Heikel played a central role in the beginnings of the Baptist movement in Finland. At the time, all religious gatherings outside of those of the Evangelical Lutheran Church of Finland were forbidden by the Conventicle Act, "used to restrict the pietistic revival movements in Finland".

In 1859, a number of members of the growing Baptist movement in Åland faced hearings in front of the Bishop's Chapter at the Turku Cathedral. Among the Lutheran clergy present was Henrik Heikel, who took an interest in the Baptists' beliefs and spoke to them to learn more, although he did not convert. After moving to Pedersöre in 1860, the Heikel family maintained a connection with the Baptists in Åland. After Henrik Heikel's death in 1867, both Anna and her brother Viktor were baptized in Stockholm by Anders Wiberg; Netta was also baptized. After her return, she began to hold meetings and share material on Baptist teachings. Heikel and her circles were influenced by the teachings of Carl Olof Rosenius and the Nyevangelism (lit. 'New Evangelism') movement.

The family received a visit from a Baptist pastor who had been at the hearing with Henrik Heikel ten years earlier; together they held meetings and the pastor's preaching led to more conversions. Four members of the Heikel family, along with nine others, founded a Swedish-language Baptist church in Jakobstad in 1870. At one point she was called to a hearing at the cathedral chapter regarding her conversion; there she was defended by Alopaeus, who, while not Baptist himself, supported her beliefs. Her beliefs were also controversial in the community and forced her to leave teaching for a time.

Anna and Netta would eventually leave the Baptists and join the Fria missionsförbundet.

== Sunday school ==
In 1861, Heikel and her sister Sofia Antoinetta (Netta) founded one of the first free church Sunday schools in the country. Later, while in Stockholm in 1868, she also learned more about the Swedish Sunday school system. The Swedish Sunday school movement had begun to grow significantly in recent years in part due to the work of Mathilda Foy, Betty Ehrenborg, and Per Palmqvist, who in turn modeled them after Methodist George Scott's work in London. She and Netta began to hold Sunday school classes at the school in 1868. They soon encouraged their friends, Miss Hellman and Miss Humble, to start a Sunday school in Vaasa. She continued to teach Sunday school even after later leaving the Baptist church for the Fria missionsförbundet.

== Temperance movement ==
Swedish Baptist missionary and colonel Oscar Broady held temperance talks in Vaasa in the late 1870s. The movement first spread to Anna and Netta's friends, the Hellmans, in Vaasa, and was soon taken up by the Heikel sisters. They formed the country's first teetotalism association in Jakobstad in 1877, attended by exclusively Baptists, including a number of children; the association caused so much controversy in the town that some students were expelled and the two were forced to leave their teaching jobs.

== Death and legacy ==
Heikel died 3 April 1907 in Jakobstad. A plaque dedicated to Heikel was unveiled there in 2014.

== See also ==
- Baptists in Finland
- Deaf education
- History of institutions for deaf education
