= Daniel Nyblin =

Norwegian-born photographer (1856–1923)

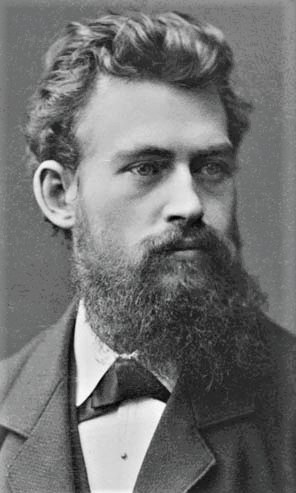
- Daniel Nyblin (before 1900)
- Born: Carl Petter Daniel Dyrendahl Nyblin; 30 June 1856; Drammen, Norway
- Died: 19 July 1923 (aged 67); Helsinki, Finland
- Education: Norwegian Mapping and Cadastre Authority photography studio, Christiania
- Occupations: Photographer, publisher
- Years active: 1875–1923
- Organization(s): Amateur Photography Club in Helsinki; Finnish Photographers' Association
- Known for: Founding Atelier Nyblin; co-founding the Amateur Photography Club in Helsinki
- Notable work: Finsk konst – Suomen taide (1883)
- Spouse: Wera Pautow (1855–1904)
- Awards: Honorary member, Amateur Photography Club in Helsinki (1911)

Carl Petter Daniel Dyrendahl Nyblin (30 June 1856 – 19 July 1923) was a Norwegian-born photographer and one of the most significant pioneers of Finnish photography. He founded Atelier Nyblin in Helsinki, Finland in 1877, one of the city's leading photographic studios. He played a central role in organising and professionalising photography in Finland – as exhibition organiser, editor, teacher and lecturer. In 1889, he co-founded the Amateur Photography Club in Helsinki, the oldest still-active photography club in the Nordic countries. He has been called "the father of Finnish photographic art".

== Biography ==
=== Early life and education ===
Daniel Nyblin was born on 30 June 1856 in Drammen, Norway. He was the son of sculptor Carl Petter Anton Dyrendahl Nyblin (1818–1883) and Petronella Pedersen (1837–1881). After studying at the photography studio of the Norwegian Mapping and Cadastre Authority in Christiania (Oslo), where he received thorough training in photography as used for cartography and lithographic printing, he undertook study trips to Copenhagen and New York and worked as a photographer in Drammen.

=== Career as photographer ===
In 1875, he moved to Helsinki, where he worked in the studios of Charles Riis. Two years later, he established his own studio, Atelier Nyblin, at Fabianinkatu 27 in Helsinki. He was assisted by his brothers, photographers Holger Nyblin (1864–1910) and Thorvald Nyblin (1871–1942), as well as his cousin Georg Nyblin. Already in its first year of operation, the studio had nearly a thousand clients. Later, he opened branches in Vyborg, Turku, Pori and Vaasa.

In addition to portraits and landscapes, he created reproductions of paintings and photographed theatrical productions, taking his first stage photographs in 1886. He collaborated with bookseller Gustaf Wilhelm Edlund and regularly photographed exhibitions of the Finnish Art Society. In 1883, they published the album Finsk konst – Suomen taide, containing photographic art reproductions. During the 1890s, Nyblin assisted the painter Albert Edelfelt by projecting photographed subjects onto canvas at full scale in the ceremonial hall of the University of Helsinki.

He also sold cameras and other photographic equipment and, after amateur photography became popular in the 1880s, he opened a store expressly for that purpose, decorated with a large number of his own landscape photographs from Finland. The retail business was incorporated in 1904 and continued as the Foto-Nyblin chain. Although he relinquished active management of the studio in 1904 following the death of his wife Wera, Atelier Nyblin continues to operate under family ownership as Finland's oldest photographic studio.

=== Organiser and promoter of photography ===
In 1889, he was one of the founders of the Amateur Photography Club, where he was a teacher and lecturer. In 1897, he took the initiative to establish the professional organisation Finlands Fotografers Forbund (Finnish Photographers' Association), but always preferred working with enthusiastic amateurs.

His interests extended to other aspects of the visual arts as well, including oil painting. He participated in art exhibitions at the Ateneum, where he became acquainted with visual artists whom he also photographed. In 1885, he fashioned a memorial to the Finnish War, which was installed in Nykarleby.

In 1903, he was the primary organizer of Finland's first photography exhibition, at the Ateneum of the Finnish National Gallery, which included professionals and amateurs. Nyblin regarded exhibitions as crucial for the development and status of photography. He emphasised the photographer's free, artistic expression rather than mere professional craftsmanship, and maintained that photography was not automatically art; rather, the artistry lay with the photographer. At the turn of the century, he was one of the central theorists of Finnish pictorialism and a pioneer of noble print techniques.

=== Publishing ===
From 1901 to 1905, he edited the Association's magazine, Fotografiskt Allehanda. When it was discontinued, he issued his own Nyblins magasin – Nyblinin tietolipas, from 1906 to 1910.

=== Later years ===
Following the death of his wife Wera in 1904, Nyblin withdrew from active business management and devoted himself to photography, writing and the study of printing techniques. In 1916, he suffered a severe brain haemorrhage, from which he never fully recovered. He died in Helsinki on 19 July 1923.

=== Legacy ===
Nyblin's photographic works are preserved in some twenty Finnish museums and archives, including the Finnish Heritage Agency, the Finnish Museum of Photography and the Helsinki City Museum, comprising thousands of portrait, landscape and documentary photographs.

=== Personal life ===
Nyblin married Wera Pautow (1855–1904) in 1877.

== Selected photographs ==
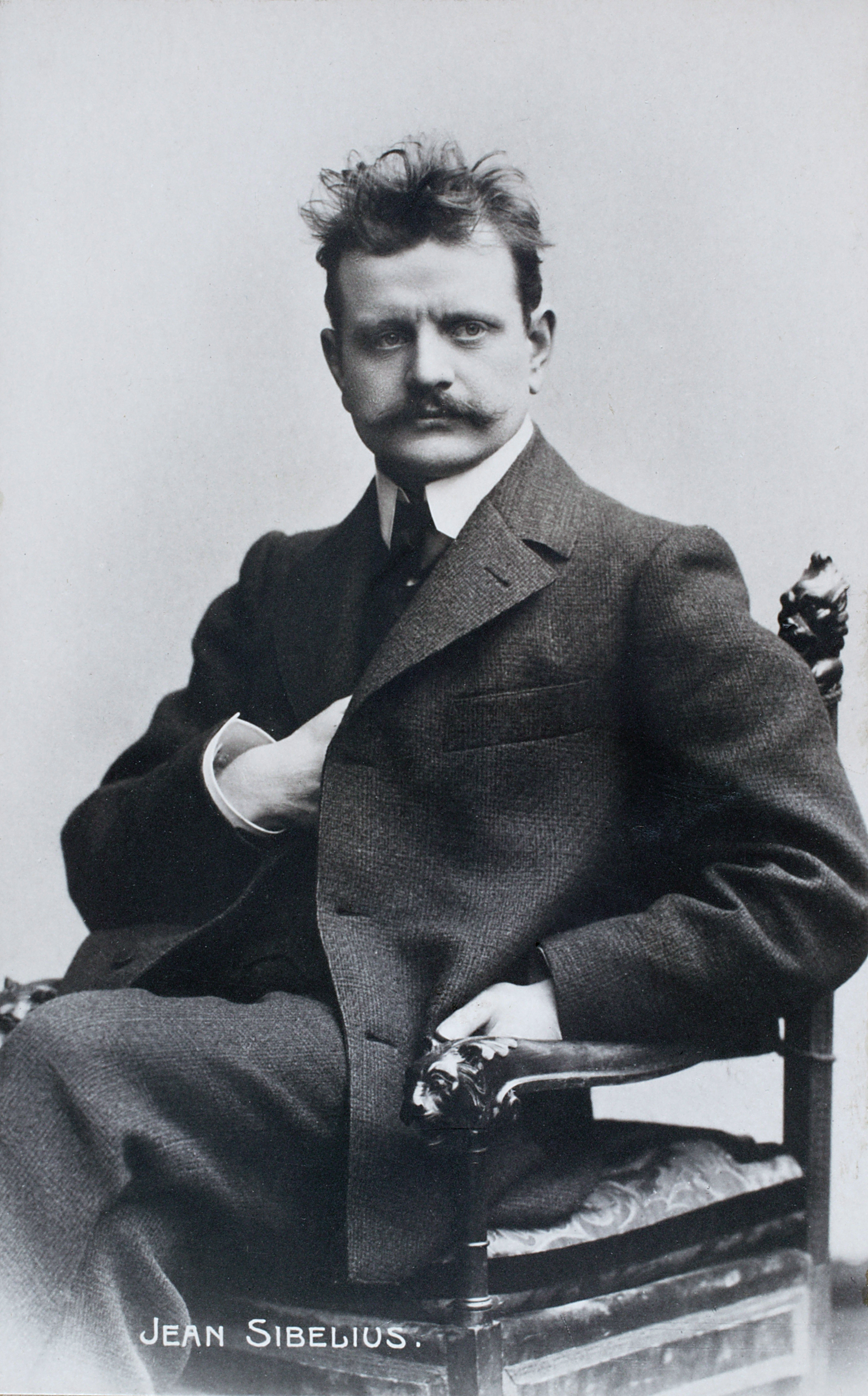
Jean Sibelius, composer

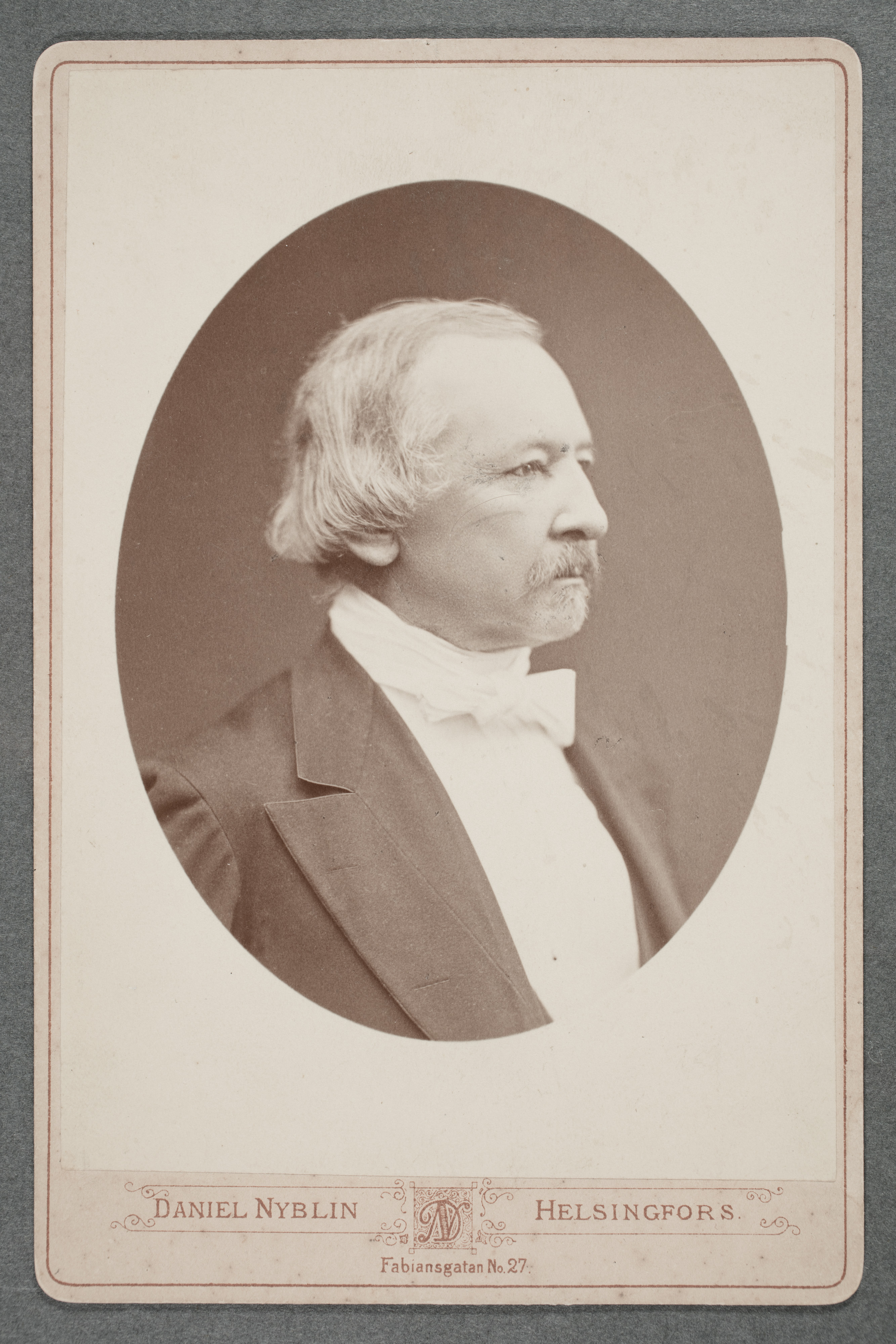
Zacharias Topelius, historian, poet, professor

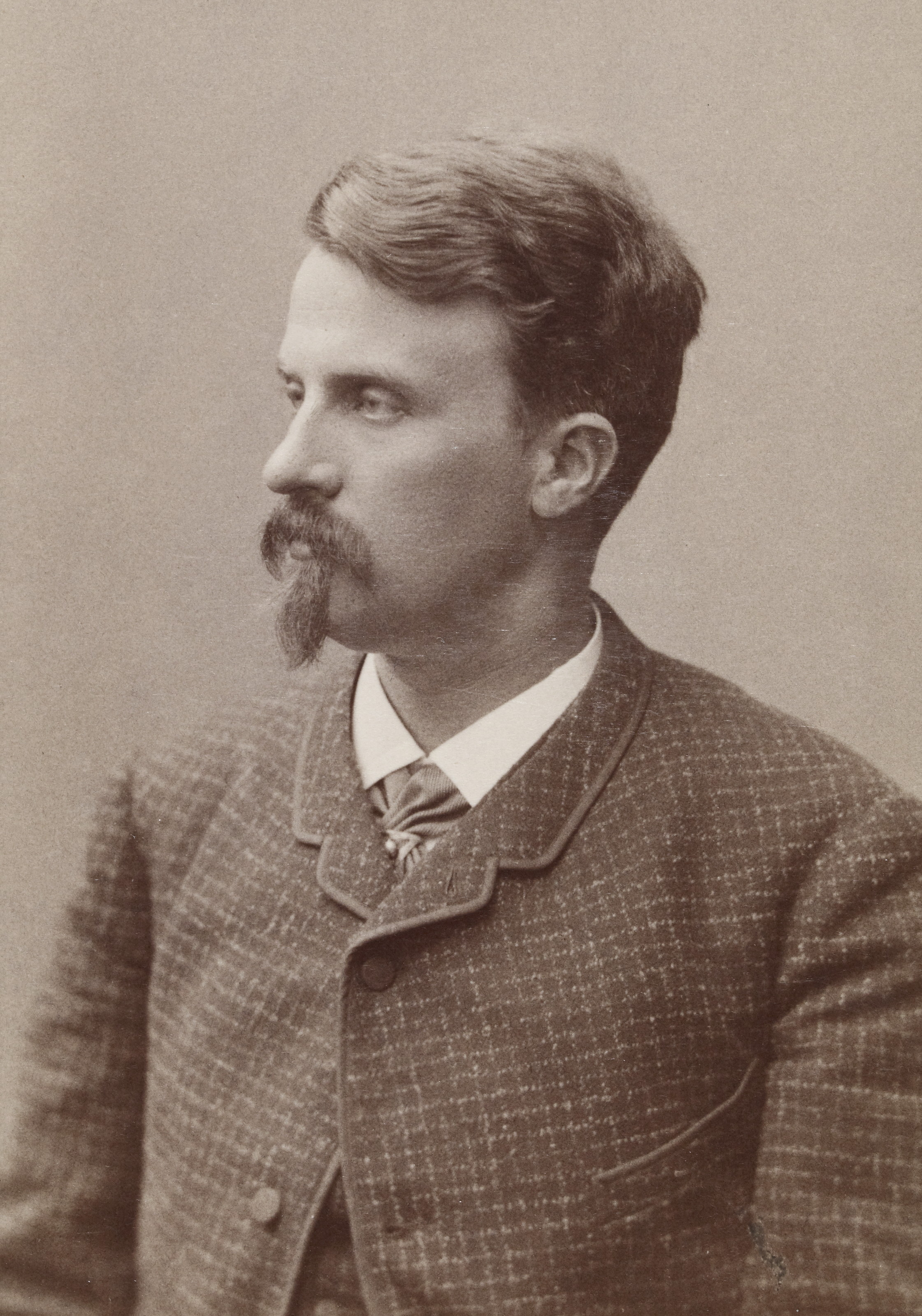
Juhani Aho, writer

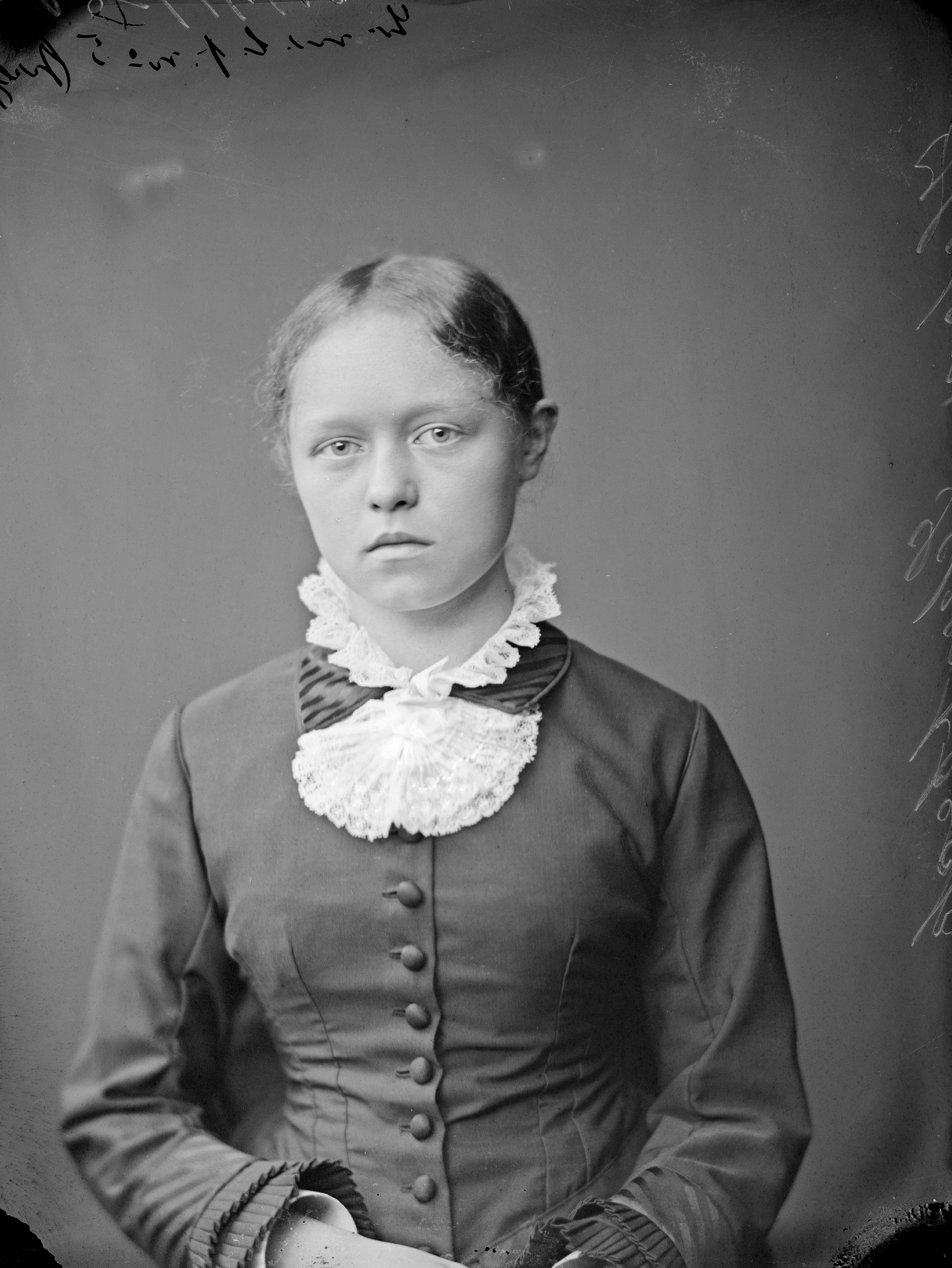
Helene Schjerfbeck, artist

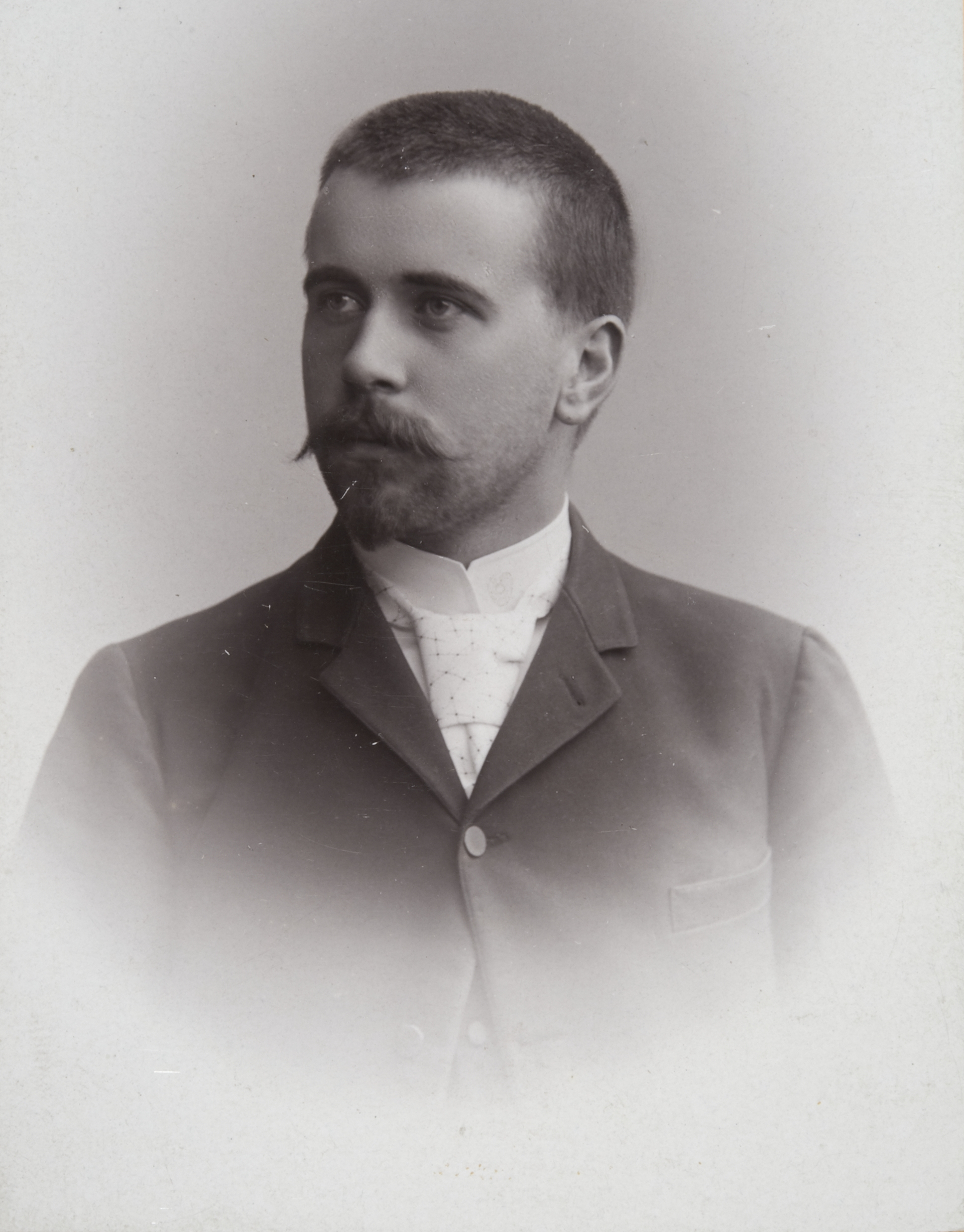
Ernst Lindelöf, mathematician and professor

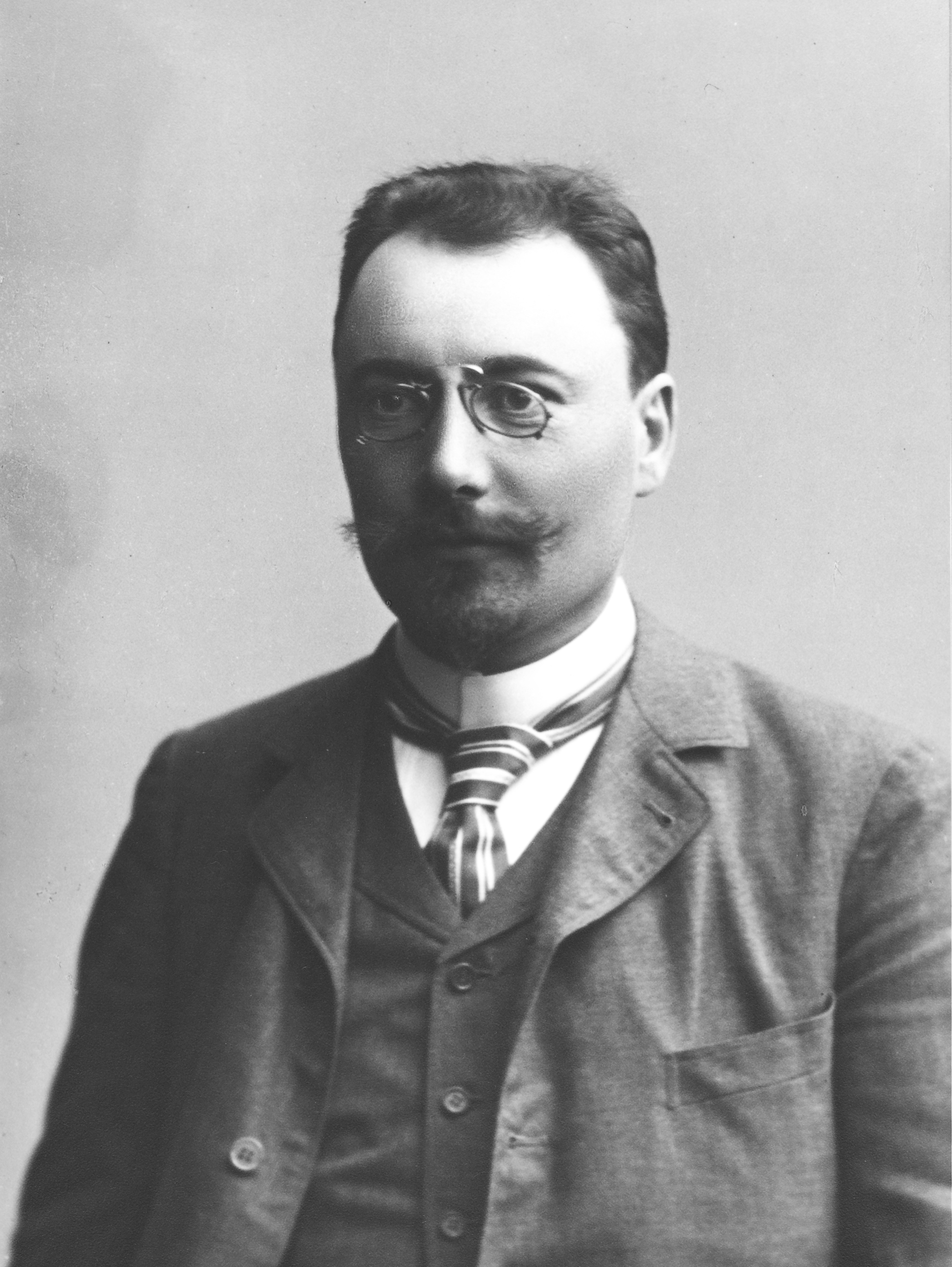
Lars Sonck, architect

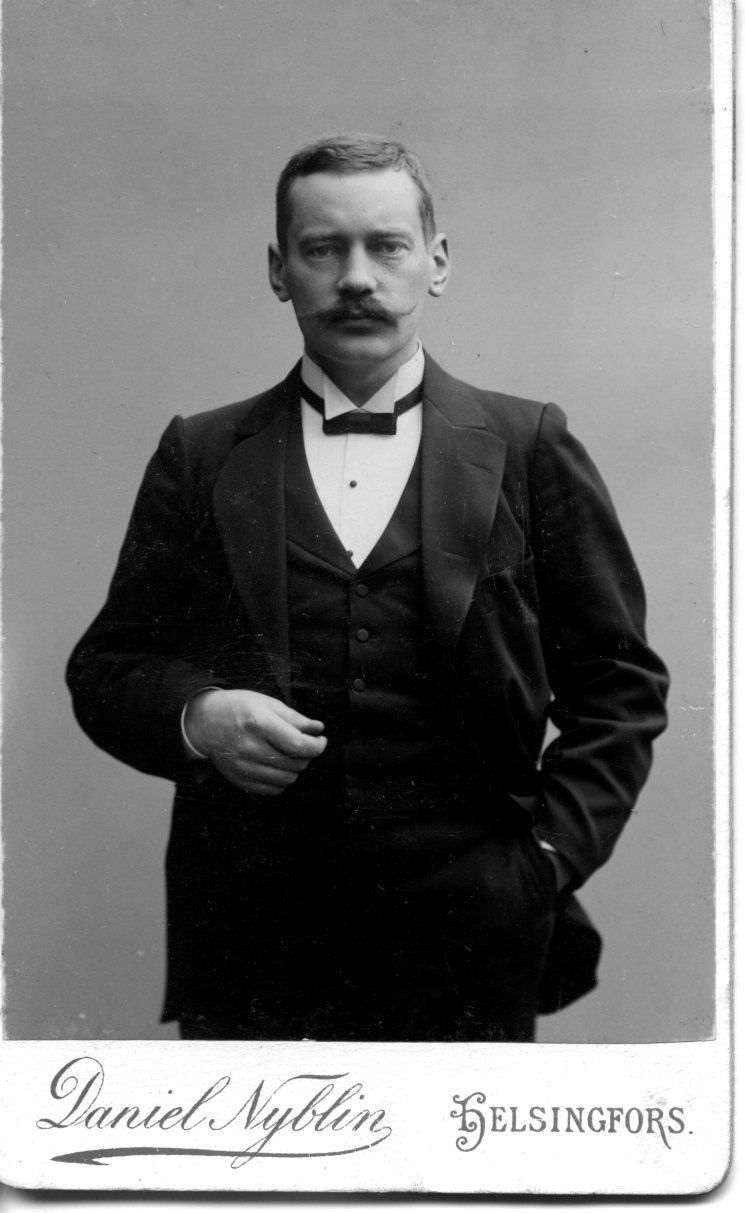
Adolf Paul, writer

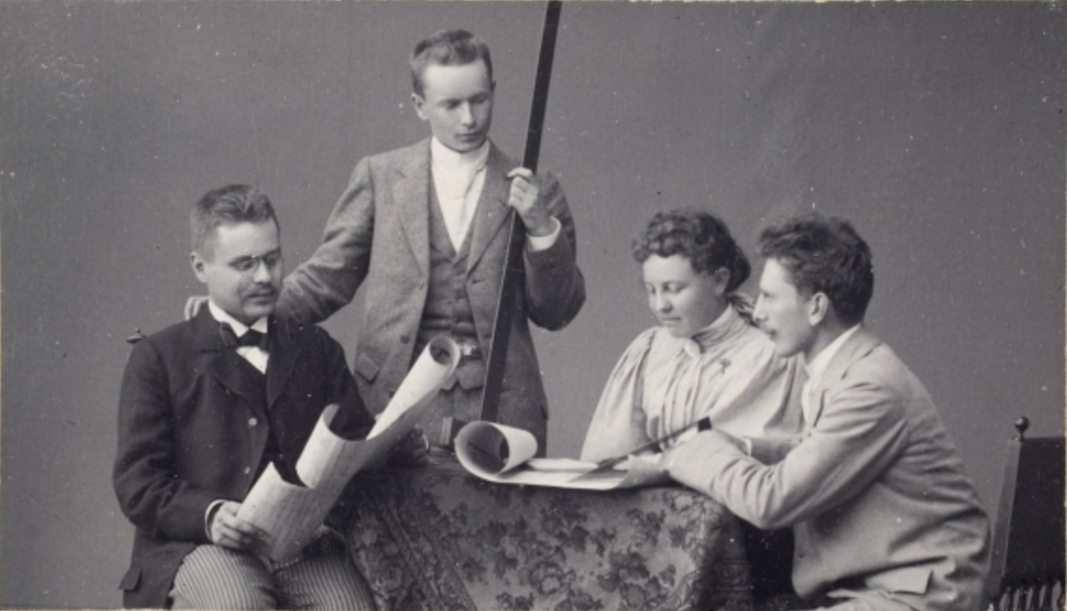
Architects: Armas Lindgren, Eliel Saarinen,
Albertina Östman and Herman Gesellius

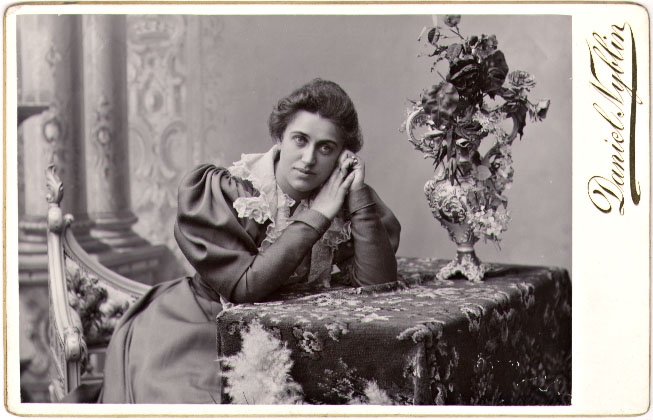
Singer Aina Mannerheim

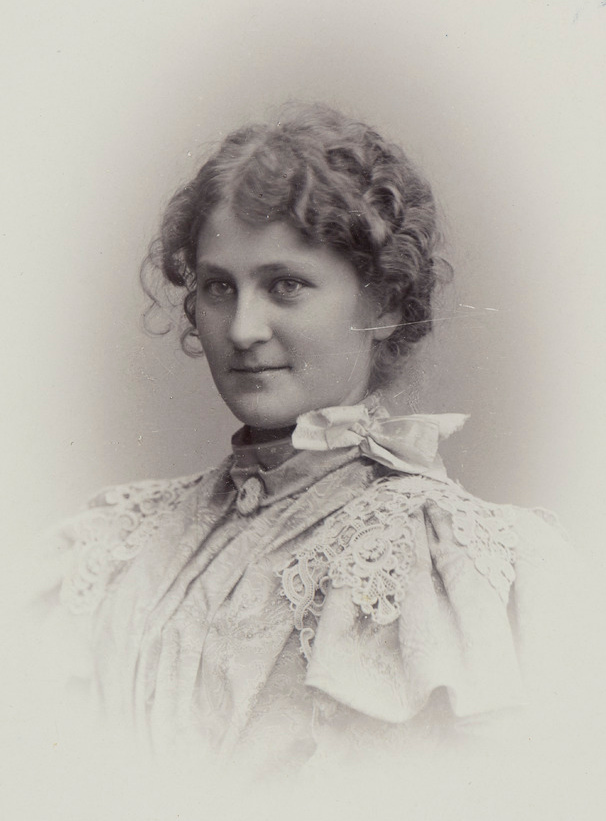
Hilda Flodin, sculptor

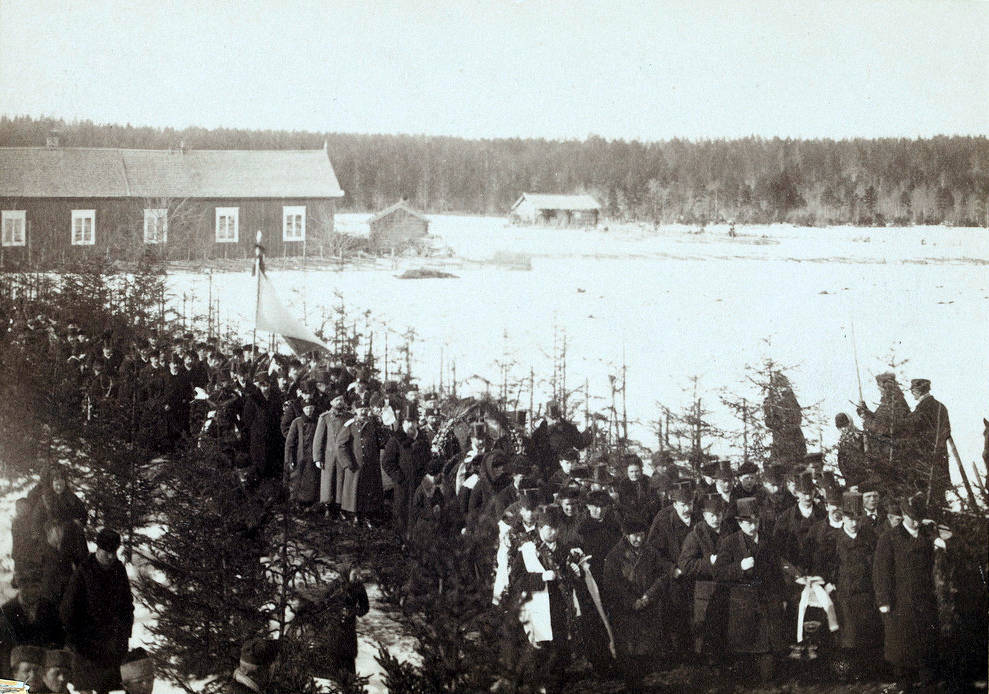
Funeral procession of Elias Lönnrot

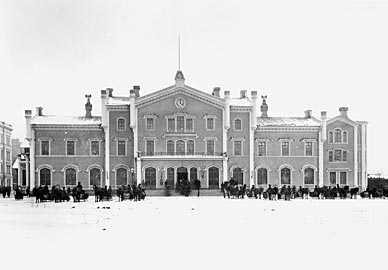
Old Helsinki railway station (1860–1909), 1893

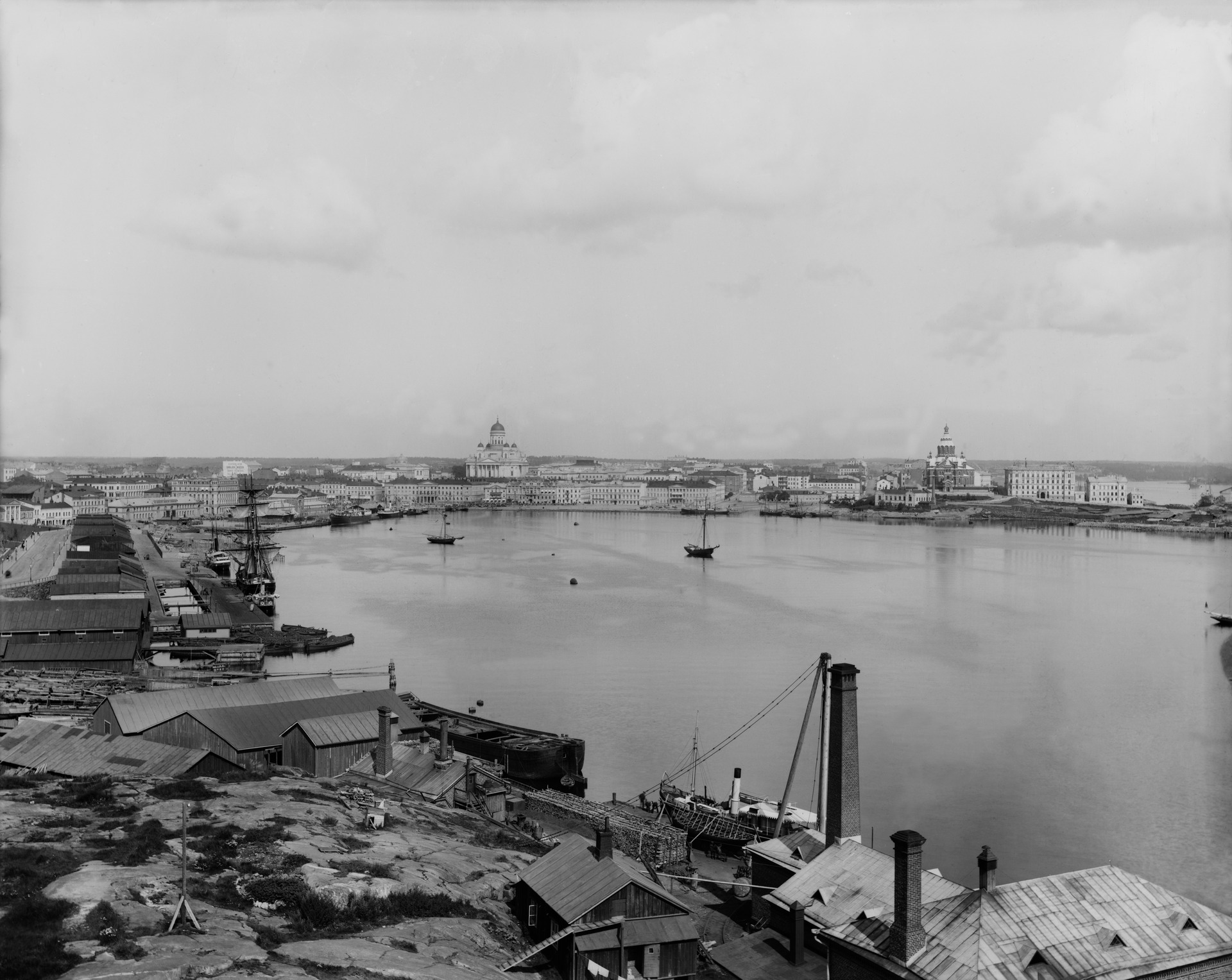
South Harbour, Helsinki

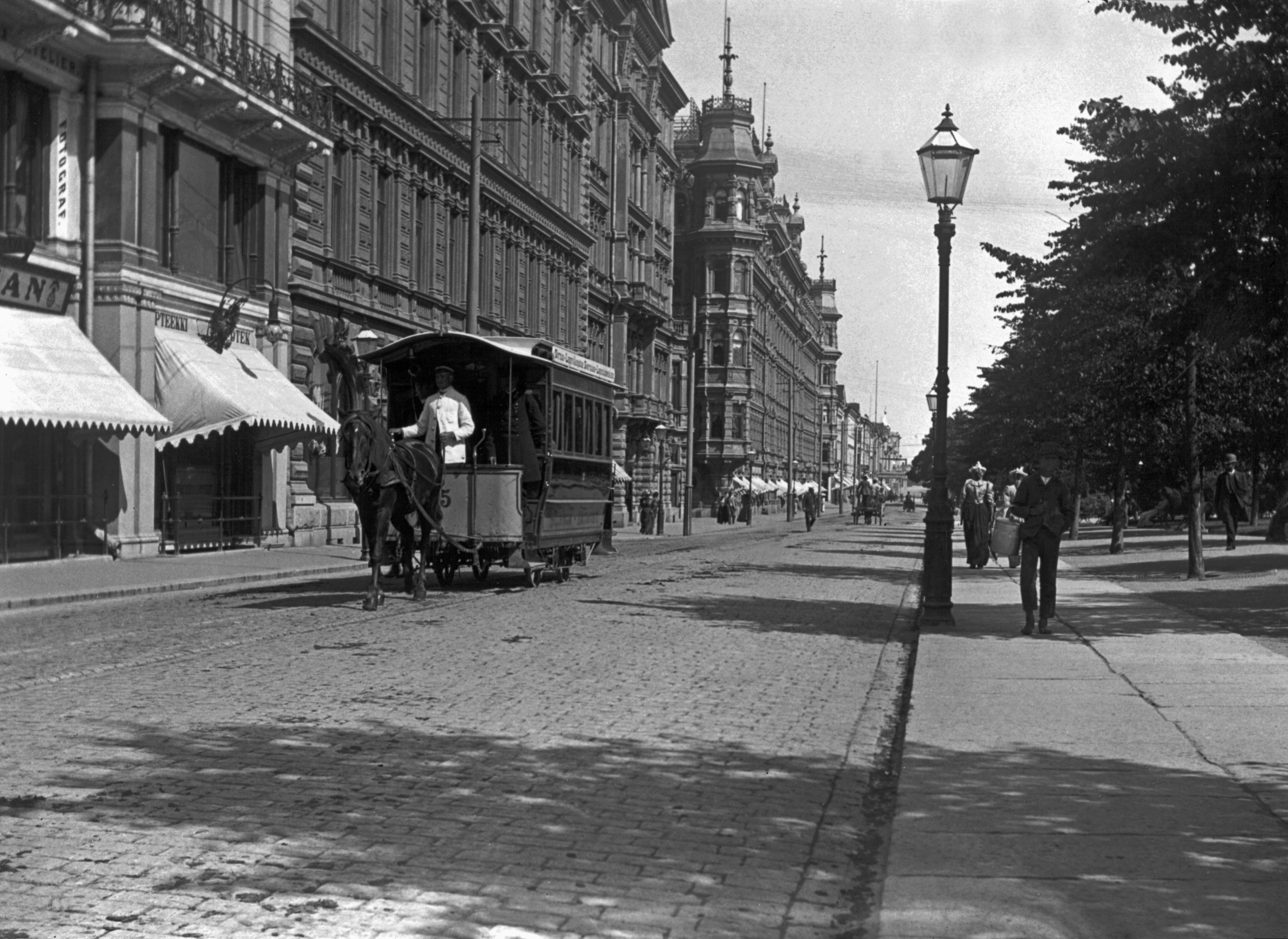
North Esplanade in Helsinki

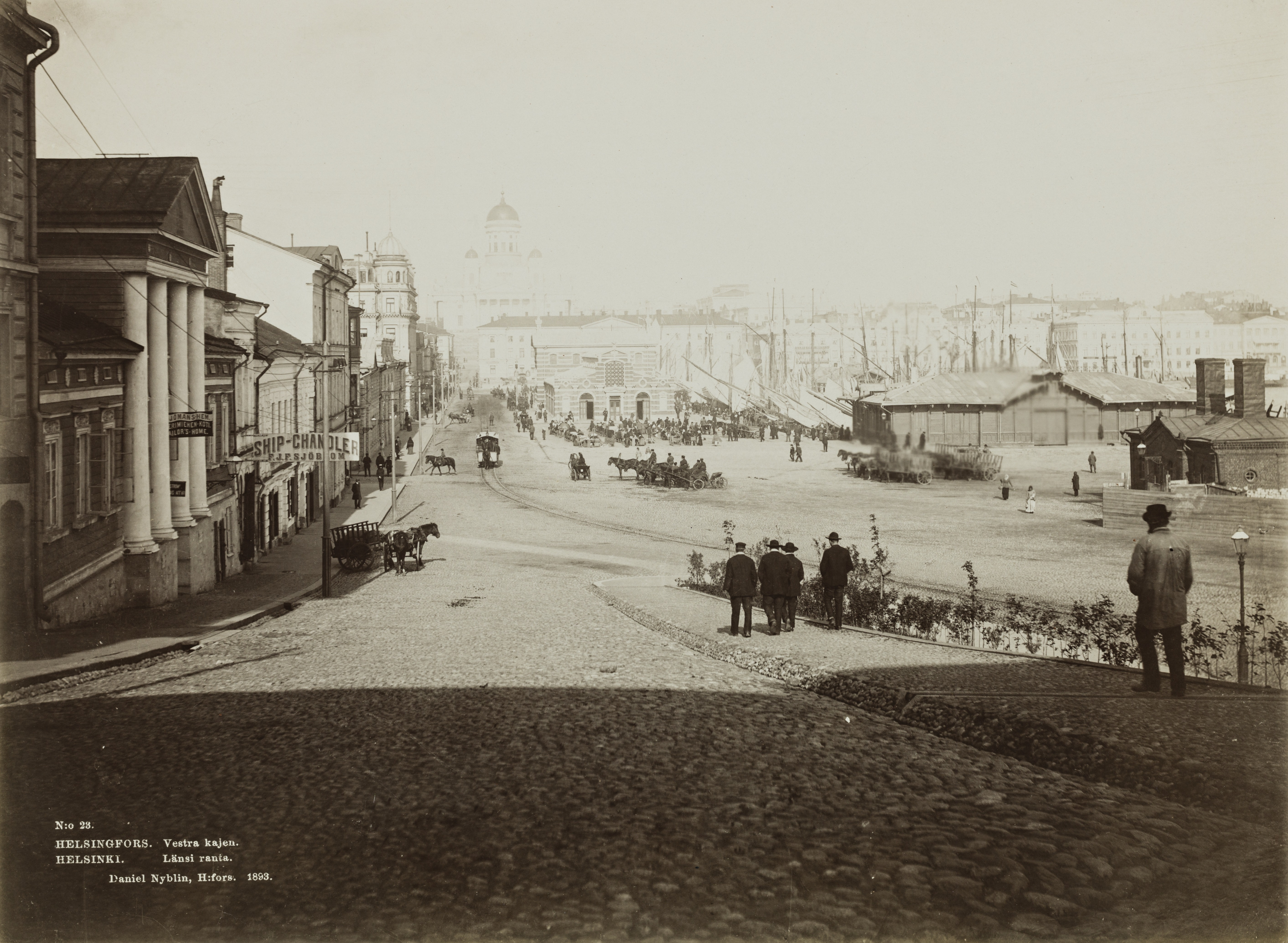
Eteläranta with Helsinki Cathedral

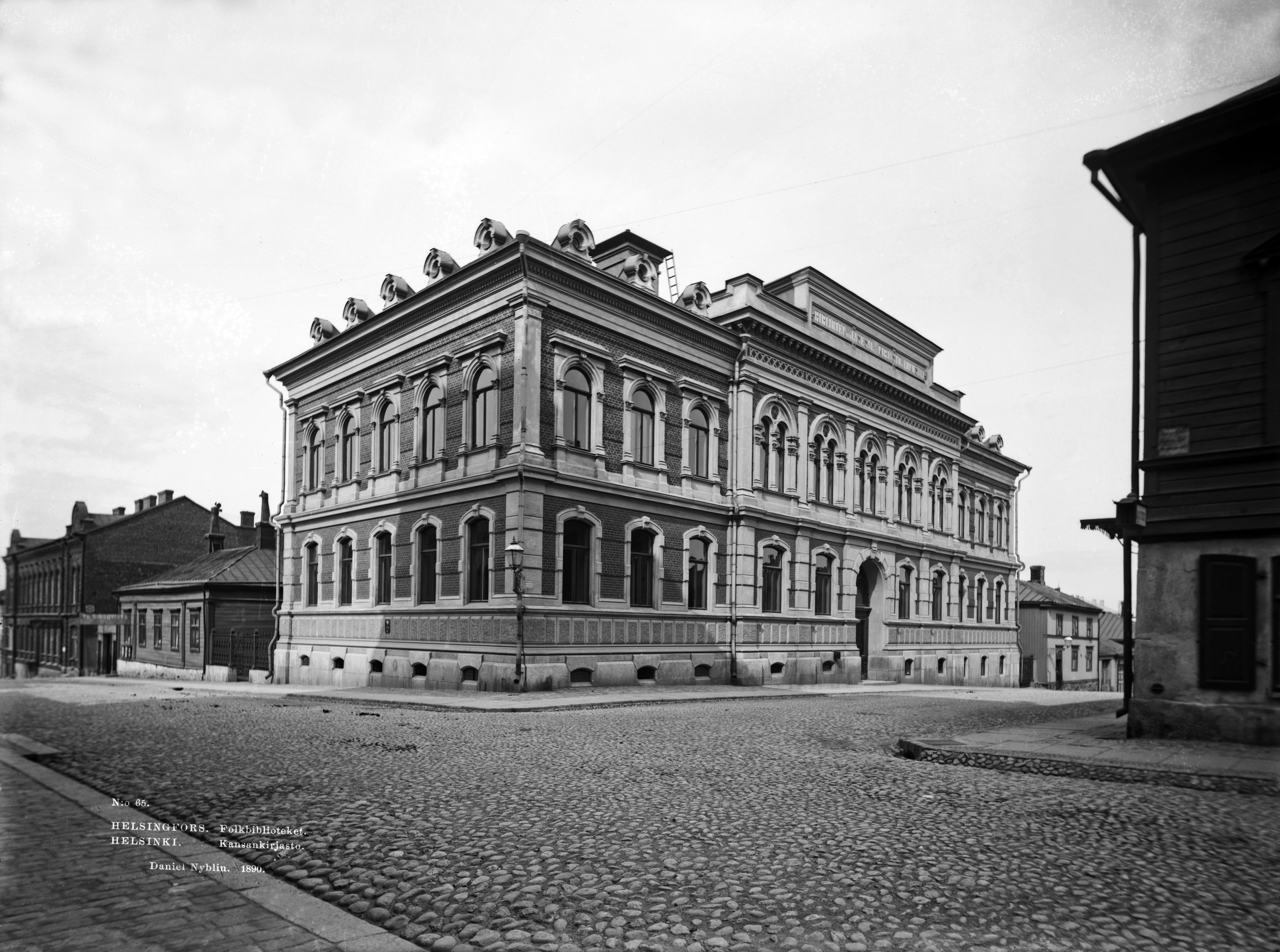
Rikhardinkatu library, former Helsinki main library
