= Vaasa Finnish Baptist Church =

- Vaasa Finnish Baptist Congregation
- Finnish: Vaasan baptistiseurakunta
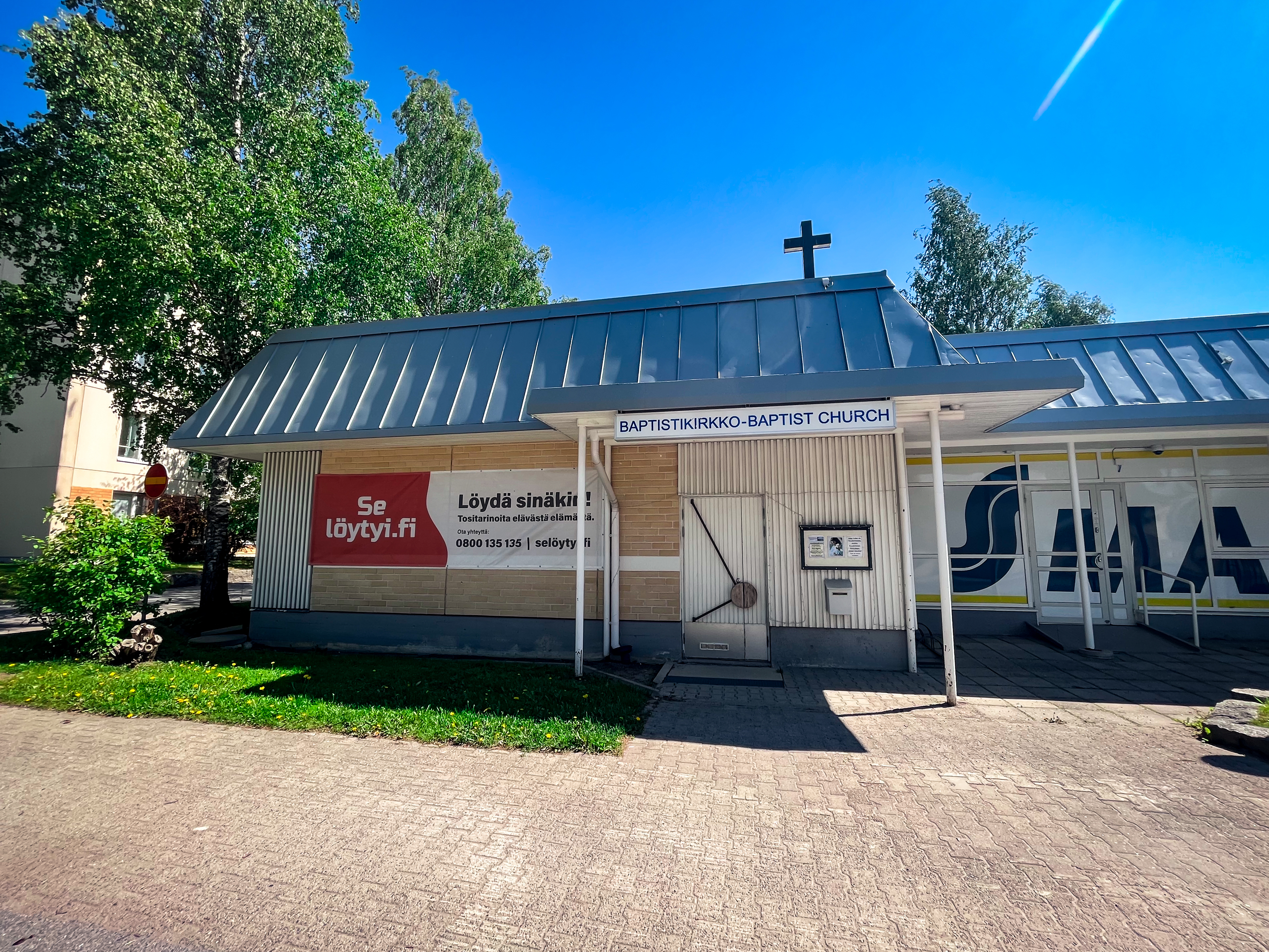
- Vaasa Finnish Baptist Church
- 63°06′36.87″N 21°35′54.70″E
- Location: Palosaari, Vaasa
- Country: Finland
- Website: www.babut.fi

History
- Founded: 20 April 1908; 118 years ago

Administration
- Diocese: Finnish Baptist Church

The Vaasa Finnish Baptist Church (also known as the Vaasa Finnish Baptist Congregation; Finnish: Vaasan baptistiseurakunta) is a Finnish Baptist congregation in Vaasa, Finland. It belongs to the Finnish Baptist Church and was founded in 1908. The current congregation building is located in the Palosaari district of Vaasa.

Vaasa also has another, Swedish-speaking Baptist congregation.

== History ==
At first, both Finnish- and Swedish-speaking Baptists met together in Vaasa, although the meetings were mainly in Swedish. Since the Finnish speakers did not understand the language, they started to gather in their own language group. Veikko Palomaa, a teacher at a Finnish-Swedish preacher's school, pushed the issue most strongly. The Finnish-speaking Baptist church of Vaasa was founded on 20 April 1908, and John Gustaf Kokki was unanimously elected as the leader of the church. In 1909, a revival took place in the congregation, as a result of which the number of members increased to 143 in twenty years. In 1916, the congregation bought a chapel in Palosaari from the Swedish-speaking Baptist congregation.

In the early days, the congregation organized Sunday school work in which a couple of hundred children and ten teachers participated. The congregation also did permanent work in Vähäkyrö, Isokyrö, Laihia, Kauhava and Härmä. Peräseinäjoki is also often mentioned as a meeting place. In 1915, 40 people came to faith in the congregation and 26 were baptized, and already the following year there were 30 baptized.

A new and current chapel building of the congregation in Palosaari was completed in 1983. At that time, the congregation relied on visiting preachers, but decided to look for a full-time employee. From the beginning of the following year, the tasks were taken over by Markku Vehkaoja, who also took care of the Baptist congregations of Jurva, Kauhajoki and Ylistaro. Among others, Jouko Neulanen and congregation leader Heimo Hokkanen spoke at the dedication ceremony of a new chapel.

== See also ==
- Baptists in Finland
- Kauhajoki Baptist Church

== Sources ==
=== Further reading ===
- Toivola, Veikko (1983). Suomalaisen baptismin tienraivaajia (in Finnish). Tampere: Kodin Ystävä. ISBN 951-99490-1-1.
- Lohikko, Anneli (2006). Baptismi Suomessa 1856–2006 (in Finnish). Tampere: Kharis Oy. ISBN 951-97895-4-5.
