= Vaajakoski Baptist Church =

- Vaajakoski Baptist Congregation
- Finnish: Vaajakosken baptistiseurakunta
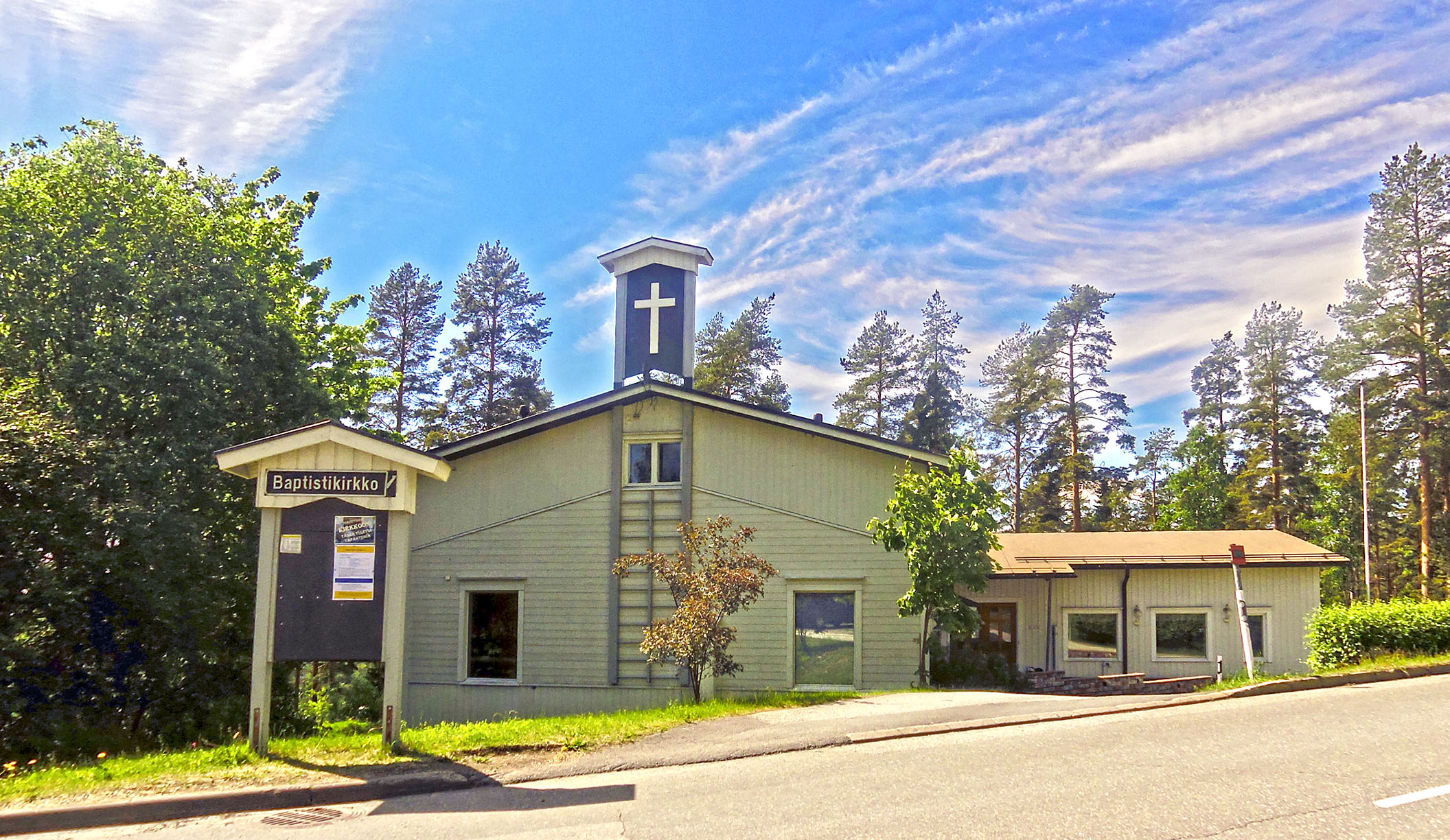
- Vaajakoski Baptist Church
- 62°15′05.21″N 25°52′06.00″E
- Location: Vaajakoski, Jyväskylä
- Country: Finland
- Website: vaajakoski.baptisti.fi

History
- Founded: 3 October 1920; 105 years ago

Administration
- Diocese: Finnish Baptist Church

The Vaajakoski Baptist Church (also known as the Vaajakoski Baptist Congregation; Finnish: Vaajakosken baptistiseurakunta) is a Finnish Baptist congregation in Jyväskylä, Finland. It belongs to the Finnish Baptist Church and was founded in 1920. As its name refers, the current congregation building is located in the Vaajakoski district of Jyväskylä.

The congregation has approximately 150 baptized members and is one of the strongest congregations of the Finnish Baptist Church together with the congregations of Turku and Tampere.

== History ==
The free church revival had an impact on the region already in the 1890s. In particular, the coming to faith of James Salvesen, the Norwegian-born ironmaster, had a strong impact on the life of the locality.

The actual work of the Baptists began in Vaajakoski in 1911, when Baptist preachers P. Mikkonen and Daavid Jokinen baptized four converts. Later, the group of believers grew into a small Baptist group. In the 1910s, Vaajakoski was influenced, among others, by Walfred Karala. Finally, the congregation was founded in October 1920, and the chairman of the founding meeting was Aleksius Hiljanen.

== See also ==
- Baptists in Finland

== Sources ==
=== Further reading ===
- Edén, David (1931). Svenska baptisterna i Finland : 1856-1931 (in Swedish). Vaasa: D. Edén.
- Lohikko, Anneli (2006). Baptismi Suomessa 1856–2006 (in Finnish). Tampere: Kharis Oy. ISBN 951-97895-4-5.
