= Oura =

Oura or Ōura may refer to:

== Places ==
- Olba (ancient city) in present Anatolia (Asian Turkey)
- Ōra, Gunma in Japan
- Ōra District, Gunma in Japan
- Ōura, Kagoshima also in Japan
- Nagasaki foreign settlement also called Oura foreign settlement in Japan
- Oura, New South Wales, a small town near Wagga Wagga, Australia
- Oura Archipelago, Finland

== Other uses ==
- Ōura (surname), a Japanese surname
- Oura Health, a Finnish health technology company
- Oura megale, an extinct species of Cambrian arthropods
