= Muurahainen =

Village in South Ostrobothnia, Finland

Coordinates: 62°8′53.16″N 22°16′4.02″E

Muurahainen is a village in the southern part of the municipality of Kauhajoki, South Ostrobothnia, Finland. Neighbouring villages include Perä-Hyyppä, Vakkurinkylä and Kauhajärvi. The Finnish national road 44 runs through the village. A few kilometres west from the village is the Lauhanvuori National Park.

The name Muurahainen translates to "ant". The name most likely comes from a house named Muurahainen. In old documents the name has been written as Murhanen. The explanation for this is a child murder committed in the 17th century ("murha" is Finnish for "murder"). Among the folk, the name Murhanen has evolved into Muurahainen and now the whole village is known as Muurahainen.

There was a school in Muurahainen from 1912 to 1988. The school now functions as the Muurahainen nature travel centre. The centre functions as the starting point and ending point of the Kauha-Hiihto skiing event.
