= Ōura (surname) =

Ōura, Oura or Ooura (written: 大浦) is a Japanese surname. Notable people with the surname include:

- Asami Oura (大浦 朝美, born 1962), Japanese water polo player
- Ōura Kanetake (大浦 兼武, 1850–1918), Japanese politician and bureaucrat
- Oura Kei (大浦 慶, 1828–1884), Japanese businesswoman
- Masafumi Ōura (大浦 正文, 1969–2013), Japanese volleyball player and coach
- Tomohiro Oura (大浦 智弘, born 1977), Japanese conductor
