= Swedish Baptist Union of Finland =

Christian church union in Finland

- Finlands svenska baptistsamfund
- Classification: Evangelical Christianity
- Theology: Baptist
- Chairman: Peter Sjöblom
- Associations: European Baptist Federation; Baptist World Alliance; Finnish Ecumenical Council
- Region: Finland
- Language: Swedish
- Headquarters: Vaasa, Finland
- Origin: 1980
- Congregations: 14
- Members: 1,035
- Publications: Missionsstandaret
- Official website: baptist.fi

The Swedish Baptist Union of Finland (Swedish: Finlands svenska baptistsamfund) is a Baptist Christian denomination based in Vaasa, Finland that was founded in 1980. It is an umbrella organization for the Baptist churches of the Swedish-speaking minority in Finland.

The Swedish Baptist Union of Finland is a member of the Finnish Ecumenical Council. It is also a member of the European Baptist Federation and the Baptist World Alliance.

The union supports cooperation with other free churches in Finland and supports mission work abroad. It publishes a newsletter entitled Missionsstandaret.

== History ==
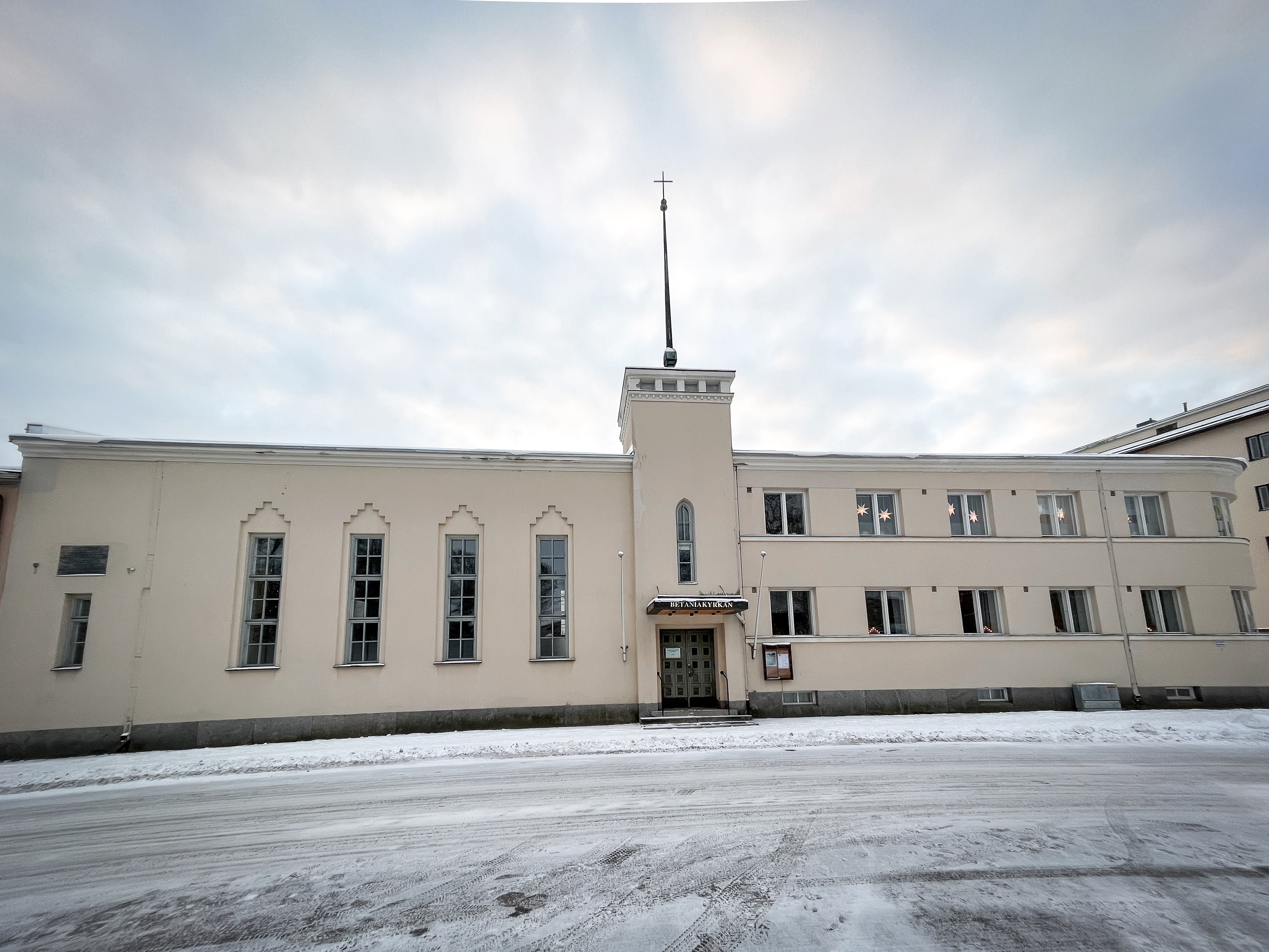
Jakobstad Bethany Church.

The first Baptist church in Finland was founded in 1856 in primarily Swedish-speaking Åland. Preacher Karl Möllersvärd had been sent there by the Evangelical Alliance in Stockholm, Sweden in 1854 and was the first to preach Baptist teachings in Finland; he received strong opposition from the established Evangelical Lutheran Church of Finland.

Despite persecution, the movement continued to grow. The first Baptist church to be founded on the mainland was Jakobstad Baptist Church in the Ostrobothnia region on 14 August 1870. The Baptist community grew and more churches were founded, including a Finnish-speaking church, Luvia, near Pori. Cooperation between Swedish-speaking and Finnish-speaking Baptists continued, including the formation in 1883 of the Vasa Swedish District Conference, which some Finnish-speaking congregations joined. However, in 1902, Finnish-speaking Baptists formed a separate Finnish National Conference. The Finnish Baptist Union (Finnish: Suomen baptistiyhdyskunta) was registered in 1928; the Swedish Baptist Union of Finland was founded later in 1980.

According to a census published by the association in 2023, it claimed 1,035 members and 14 churches.

== See also ==
- Baptists in Finland
- Religion in Finland
