= Markus Kajo =

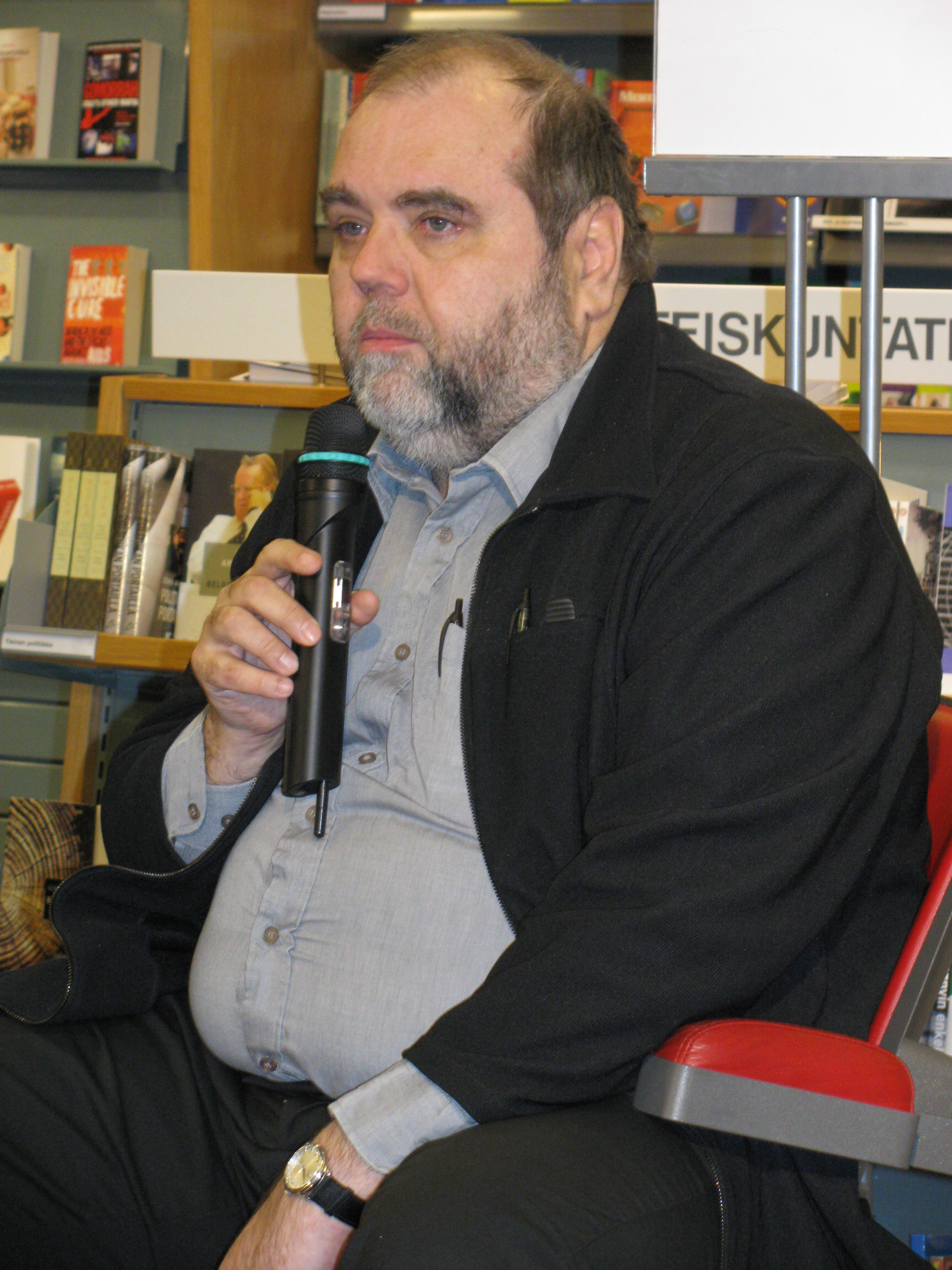
- Markus Kajo (2008)
- Born: Markus Aarni Erämies Kajo; 7 December 1957 (age 68); Isojoki, Finland

Markus Aarni Erämies Kajo (born 7 December 1957 in Isojoki) is a Finnish reporter, screenwriter and TV show host. He has appeared on YLE TV2 in shows such as Ihmisen käsikirja, Markus Kajon ruudunsäästöohjelma, Naurun paikka and TV-ohjelma Kettunen.

== Bibliography ==
- Kettusen kirja (WSOY, 1989)
- Kettusen toinen tuleminen (WSOY, 1991)
- Kettusen kirja (WSOY, 1992) - audio book
- Kettusen päästöt eli Toisinajattelijain satuja (WSOY, 1993) - audio book
- Kettusen kolmas (WSOY, 1995)
- Kettusen kootut (WSOY, 1996)
- Kettusen paluu: Ihmisen käsikirja (WSOY, 2003)
