= Oura Archipelago =

Coordinates: 61.833358°N 21.331949°E

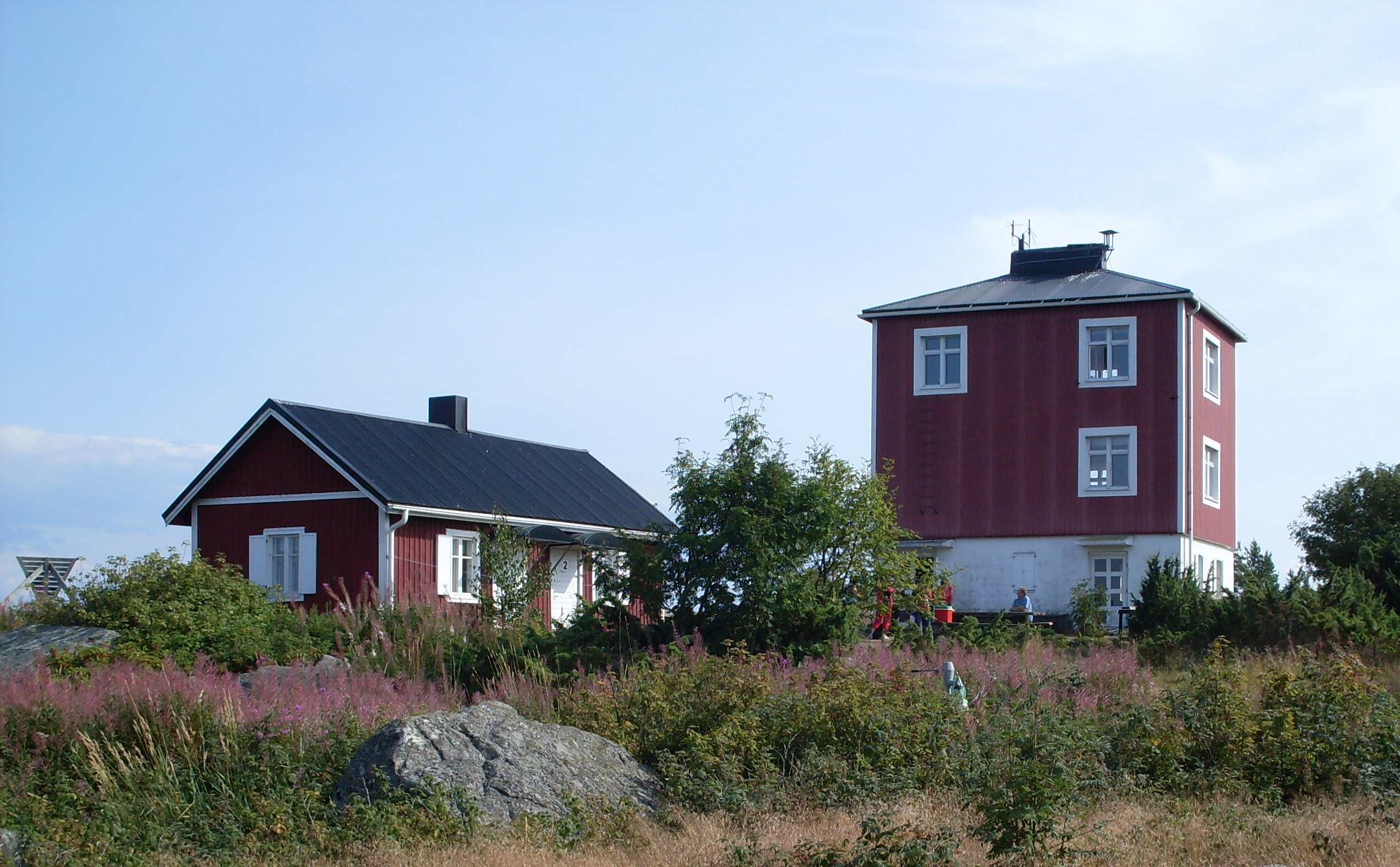
Old pilot station at Ouraluoto-island

The Oura Archipelago is a group of islands near the city of Pori in Finland. It is a part of the municipality of Merikarvia. The archipelago consists of approximately 300 islands. It is part of the Bothnian Sea National Park, that was established in 2011. The main island Ouranluoto has several tourist services. It can be reached by the harbour of Krookka.

The Oura Archipelago is famous for the Oura-opera which was written by Finnish author Arvo Salo. It was performed from 2002 to 2005 in Krookka harbour on Merikarvia municipality. A new opera is still performed yearly at Krookka.

== Sources ==
- Municipality of Merikarvia
- Oura-opera (in Finnish)
