= Mathilda Roslin =

Finnish journalist (1837–1923)

Mathilda Roslin-Kalliola
- Born: 28 May 1837 Merikarvia, Finland
- Died: 25 April 1923 (aged 85) Merikarvia
- Occupation: Writer

Mathilda (Matilda) Roslin-Kalliola born Ahlroth (28 May 1837 – 25 April 1923) was a Finnish journalist and writer.

Her First language was Swedish, but she wrote in Finnish. She has been characterized as a folk writer.

== Life and career ==
Roslin's parents were Juha Ahlroth of Mäkitupa and the vicar Bergelin's granddaughter Karoliina Juhontytär. Roslin attended a circuit school and earned a living as a seamstress, salesperson and craft teacher, but writing was her passion. Her writings have been published by e.g. The Finn of America and Satakunta. Roslin's manuscripts are in the manuscript archive of the University of Tampere. Roslin got her name in Governor-General Bobrikoff's "Black Book" when she launched the so-called Great Speech to appeal to Nicholas II of Russia.

Roslin received a summons to the Court of Appeal of Turku in 1914 after the publication of his work Miettei Gogi sostasta. The work had previously appeared in Swedish without attracting more attention. However, the challenge lapsed. In the work, Roslin presented the prophecies of the war that would end Russia's oppressive rule in Finland, told by Gustaf Nyholm, the vicar of Merikarvia, in 1877.

The opera Matilda and Nikolai, based on Roslin's life, was composed by Arvo Salo from Merikarvia and composer Ilkka Kuusisto. Pori Opera performed it in 2004 in Pori's Promenadisal. Roslin's writer's home in Merikarvia next to the municipal office has been preserved as a museum.

== Works ==
- At the dawn of the last century : family memories, revised and added by Hilda Käkikoski Kansanvalistus seura, 1902
- Åland, dess natur, folk och minnen, Svenska folkskolans vänner, 1888
- Dead or Fake Dead? Society for General Education, 1897
- På Tröskeln till det förflutna århundradet, familjeminnen, Folkupplysningssällskapet, 1902
- Inkeri, family memories from the time of Ison-viha, 1907
- Reflections on Gog's war, vicar Gust who died in Merikarvia. Narrative according to Nyholm, 1912
- When and where did the death occur? 1897
- Views of Patmos, 1922
- Snäkki and other memoirs, 1908
- Tankar om Gogs krig, new edition, 1917
- My Message from Past Generations The Life and Stories of Matilda Roslin-Kalliola, 1921.
- Estonian Tommi, The story of Merikarvia, 1908, New edition 2021.
