= Kauhajoki Baptist Church =

- Kauhajoki Baptist Congregation
- Finnish: Kauhajoen baptistiseurakunta
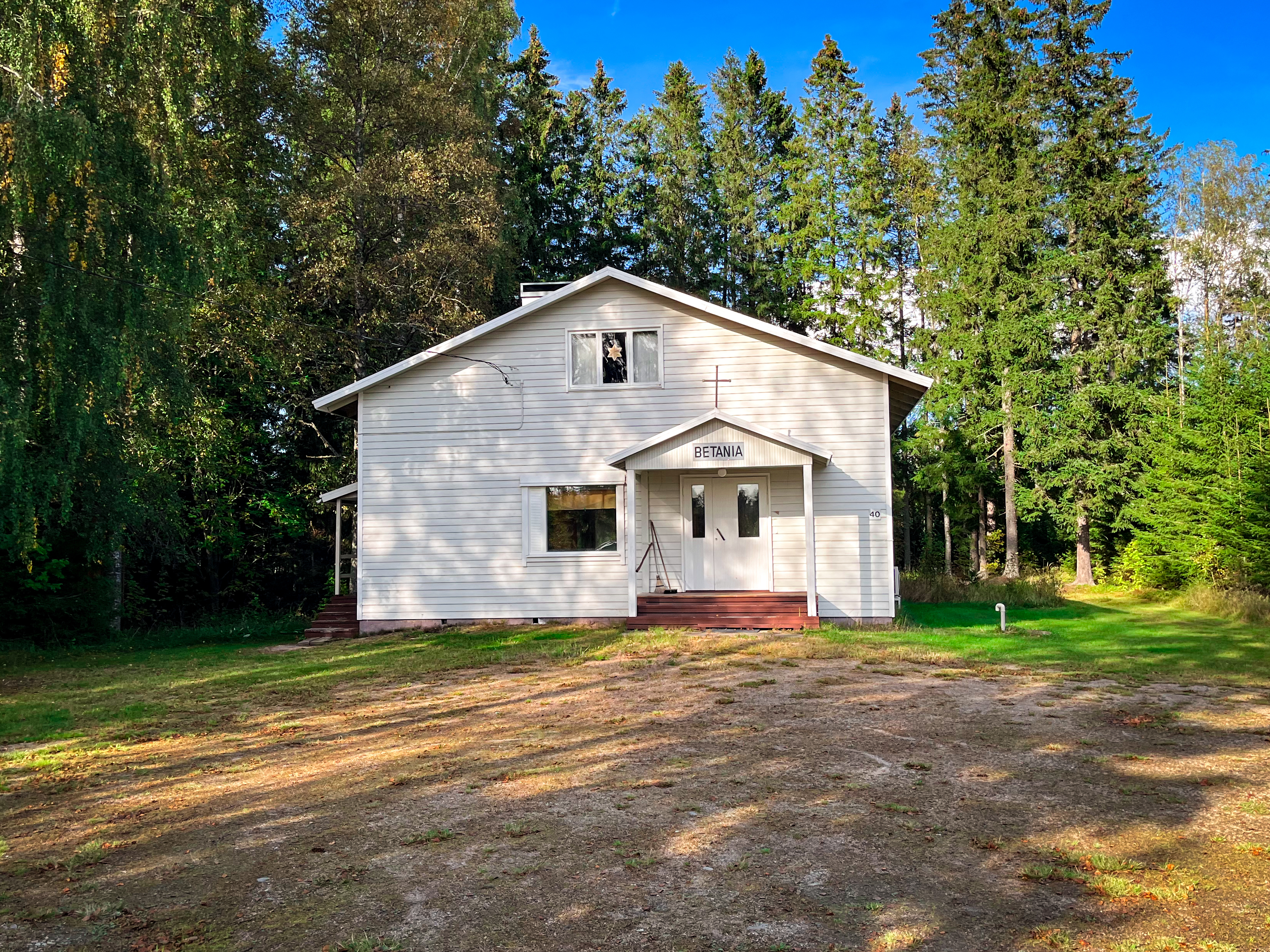
- Kauhajoki Baptist Church
- 62°27′53.20″N 22°03′14.35″E
- Location: Kainasto, Kauhajoki
- Country: Finland
- Website: www.kauhajoenbaptistisrk.fi

History
- Founded: 3 July 1949; 76 years ago

Administration
- Diocese: Finnish Baptist Church

The Kauhajoki Baptist Church (also known as the Kauhajoki Baptist Congregation; Finnish: Kauhajoen baptistiseurakunta) is a Finnish Baptist congregation in Kauhajoki, Finland. It belongs to the Finnish Baptist Church and was founded in 1949. The current congregation building is located in the Kainasto village, about 8 kilometres (5.0 mi) northwest of the town centre.

== History ==
There were Baptists in Kauhajoki as early as the 19th century, and Baptist events had been held in Kauhajoki since the beginning of the 20th century by Jurva's congregation. Kauhajoki's official congregation was founded on 3 July 1949 in the house of Juho Hangasluoma, located in the Hangasluoma village.

Especially young people came to faith in Kauhajoki. In the summer of 1949, 36 members joined the congregation, and at the turn of the year there were 52 members. In the fall of 1949, a joint brotherhood meeting of Baptists and Pentecostals was organized in Kauhajoki. The meeting had planned the union of Baptists and Pentecostals, and especially the young people saw a perfect union in the doctrine of the churches. The union never happened, but the events drew crowds.

In 1955, preacher Matti Lehtonen joined the congregation. At that time, the congregation had no any kind of offices. Lehtonen donated an estate of land to the congregation in the village of Kainasto, and construction of the chapel began. Kauhajoki's new chapel was a joint project of Lehtonen and Eero Lehtikevari.

== See also ==
- Baptists in Finland

== Sources ==
=== Further reading ===
- Lohikko, Anneli (2006). Baptismi Suomessa 1856–2006 (in Finnish). Tampere: Kharis Oy. ISBN 951-97895-4-5.
