= Kauhajoki Airfield =

Kauhajoki Airfield Kauhajoen lentokenttä
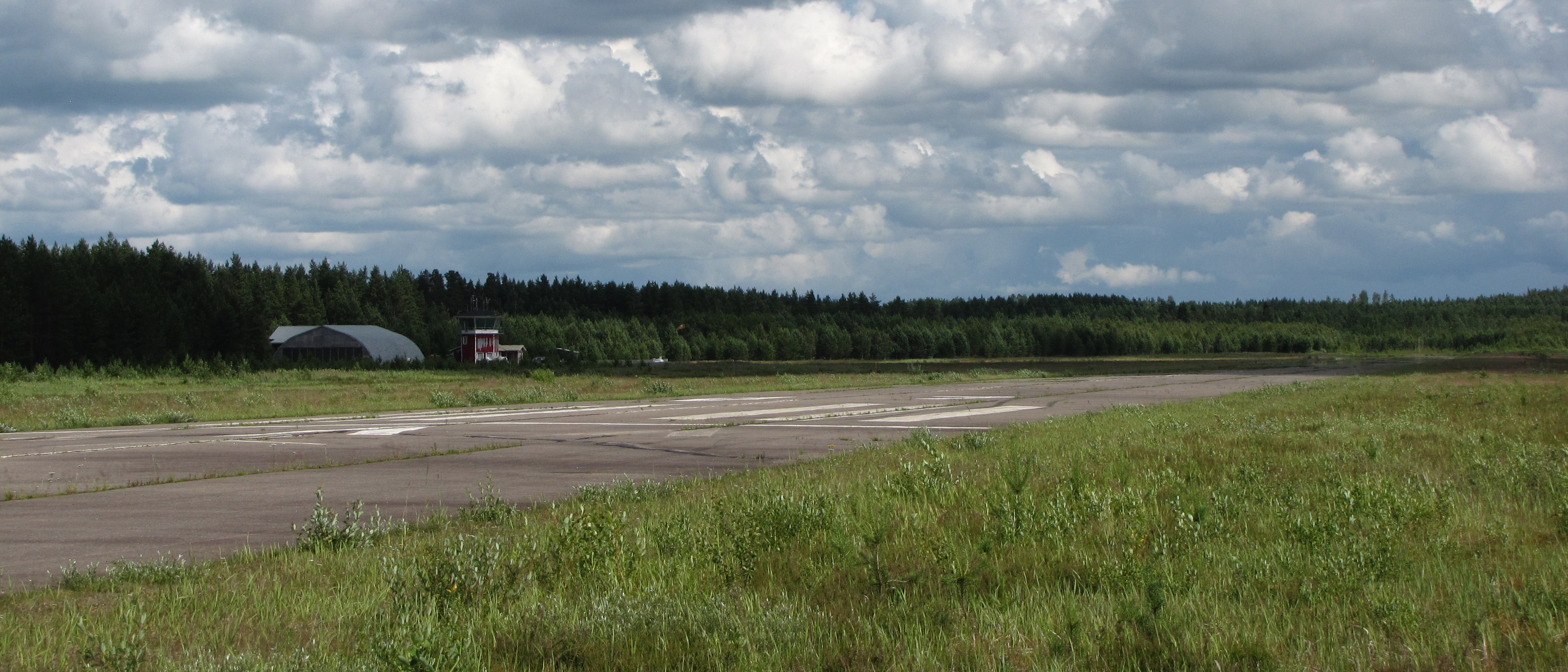
- IATA: KHJ; ICAO: EFKJ

Summary
- Airport type: Privately owned
- Operator: Kauhajoen Lentokenttä Oy (Kauhajoki Airport Ltd)
- Location: Kauhajoki, Finland
- Elevation AMSL: 407 ft / 124 m
- Coordinates: 62°27′49″N 022°23′28″E

Map
- Location within Finland

Runways
Direction	Length		Surface
Direction	m	ft	Surface
07/25	1,160	3,806	Asphalt
- Source: VFR Finland

Kauhajoki Airfield (IATA: KHJ, ICAO: EFKJ) is an aerodrome located in Kauhajoki, Finland, about 8 nautical miles (15 km; 9 mi) east-northeast of Kauhajoki centre.

== Facilities ==
The airport resides at an elevation of 407 feet (124 m) above mean sea level. It has one runway designated 07/25 with an asphalt surface measuring 1,160 by 23 metres (3,806 ft × 75 ft).

== See also ==
- List of airports in Finland
