= Lauhanvuori National Park =

National park in South Ostrobothnia, Finland

- IUCN category II (national park)
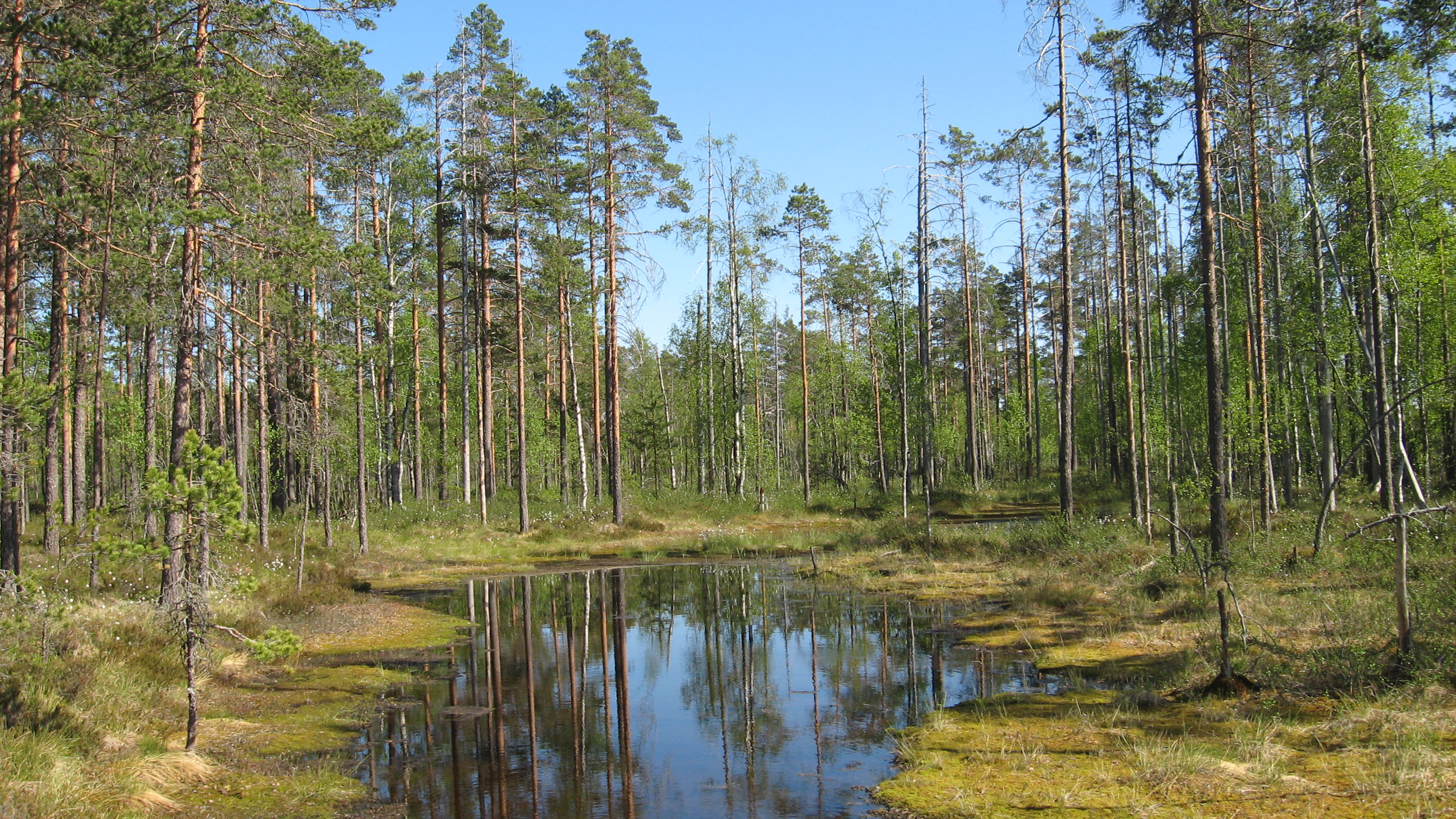
- A swamp lake in Lauhanvuori National Park, Isojoki

- Location within Finland
- Location: South Ostrobothnia, Finland
- Coordinates: 62°09′07″N 22°10′30″E
- Area: 53 km^{2} (20 sq mi)
- Established: 1982
- Visitors: 21,700 (in 2024)
- Governing body: Metsähallitus
- Website: https://www.luontoon.fi/en/destinations/lauhanvuori-national-park

Lauhanvuori National Park (Finnish: Lauhanvuoren kansallispuisto) is a national park in the South Ostrobothnia region of Finland, on the border of Kauhajoki and Isojoki. It was established in 1982 and covers 53 square kilometres (20 sq mi).

The park is characterized by its pine forestland, spring brooks, and swamps.

== Nature ==
=== Mountain ===
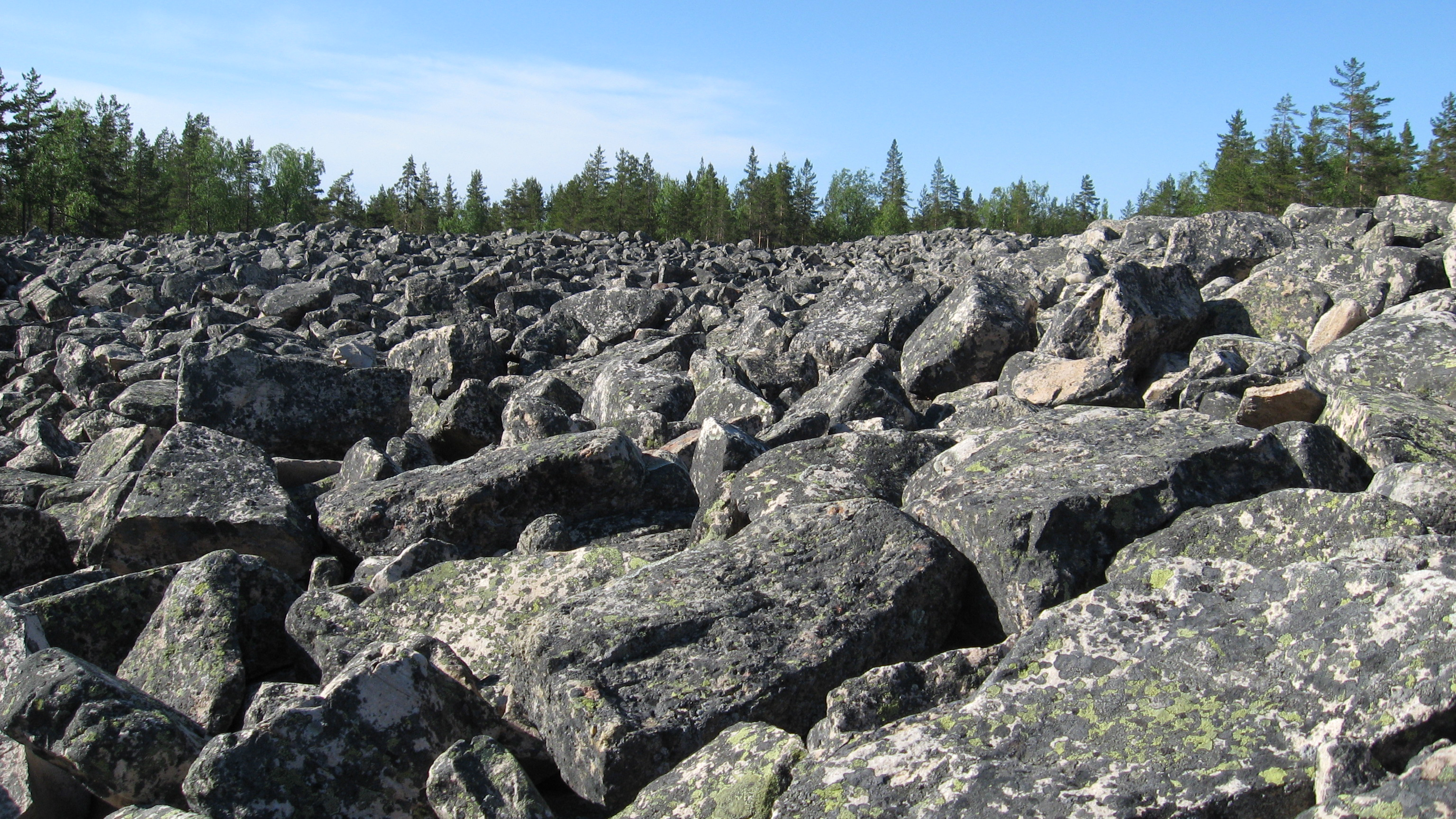
"Kivijata"

The Lauhanvuori mountain is a 231 m (758 ft) high moraine mountain and one of the highest points in Western Finland. The summit area was uncovered 9500 BCE when the glacier retreated, and it has never been under the water. Indeed, it was an island in the middle of the Ancylus Lake.

=== Flora and fauna ===
The summit of Lauhanvuori is lusher than its surroundings due to not having been under the sea and thus having retained its loose soil and nutrients. The hillsides are barren and infertile.

Cranes and capercaillies can be heard in the bogs during summertime. The willow grouse also inhabits the bogs. The park also has a hectare of fen, where Succisa pratensis, brown beak-sedge, carnation sedge, moor rush, Scottish asphodel, and many rare mosses grow. Lauhanvuori is the southernmost habitat of the Scottish asphodel.

== See also ==
- List of national parks of Finland
- Protected areas of Finland
