= Pilot station =

Onshore headquarters for maritime pilots

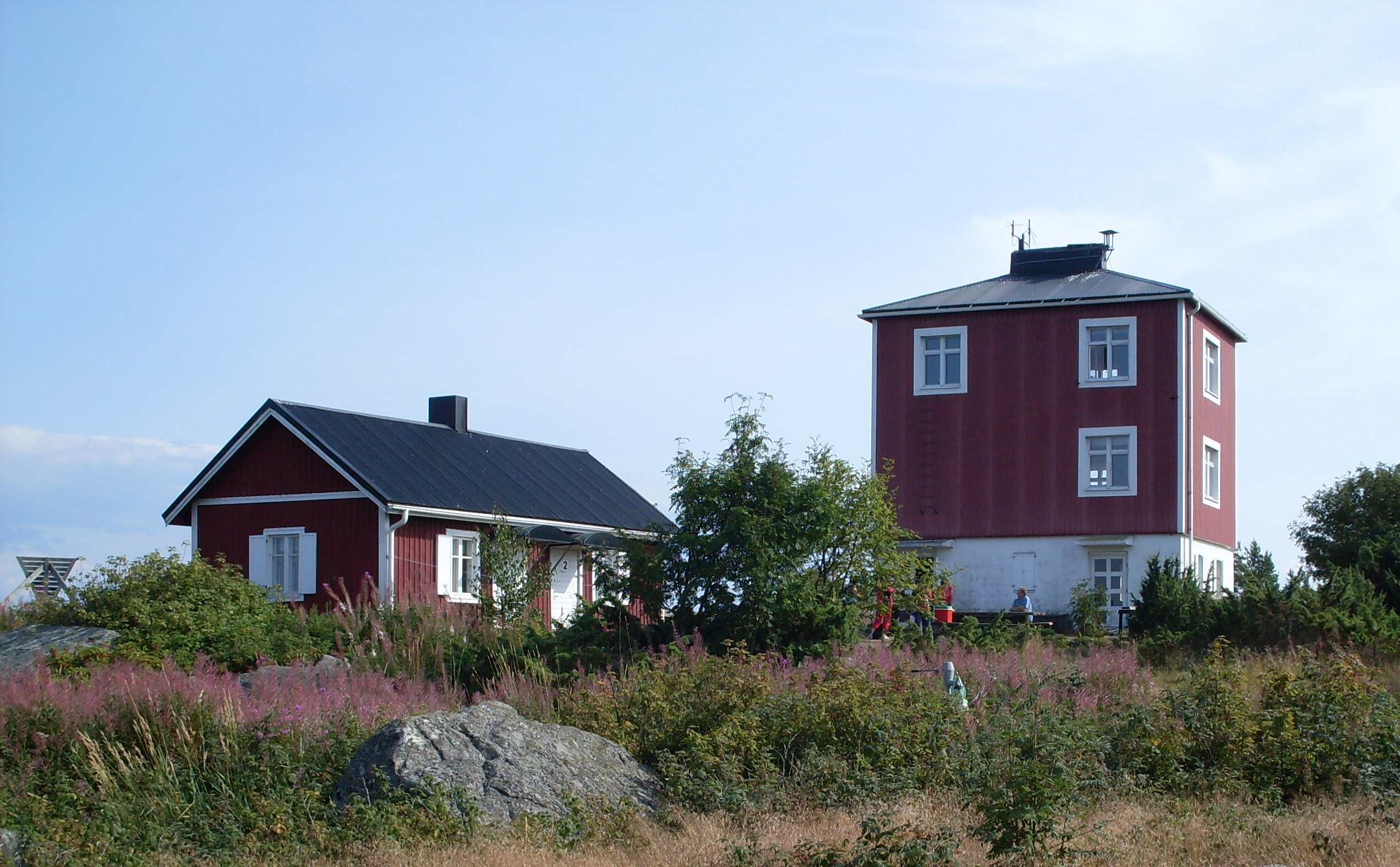
Old pilot station at Ouraluoto island

A pilot station is an onshore headquarters for maritime pilots, or a place where pilots can be hired from. To get from a pilot station to an approaching ship, pilots need to use fast vessels to arrive in time, i.e. a pilot boat.

== History ==
Historically, pilot stations would often be found on an island or other point at sea near a harbor, giving pilots ample time to transfer to an approaching boat. Two boats would rotate and operate around the clock. Pilot boats would stay at a station for up to a week. It was typical that up to six pilots would be on a boat to board incoming vessels. Pilots would be dropped off at the pilot station after bringing a boat in so they could pick up another outgoing vessel.

Boats working with pilot stations were called station boats. The Cape Cod pilot station and the Boston Light were examples of pilot stations. The station boats stayed inside the line between Race Point Light to the northwest and Highland Light to the south. The Cape Cod Pilot Station was established in 1873. Pilots would have "station duty" where they were expected to patrol an area and not go beyond it. If they did, they could be reported to the Pilot Commissioner. When they were not on station boat duty they could go wherever they wanted and some went 300 miles or more from port.

== Today ==
Modern pilot boats being much faster, most pilot stations are now on the mainland. The Ambrose Pilot Station is an example of a pilot station used today by the Sandy Hook Pilots. Ships will notify the pilot station by radio when they are expected to enter the harbor. The pilot station has a radio and radar so it can talk to the captain of the ship and see the ship as it approaches. The pilot station will then send a pilot to meet the ship and guide it into the harbor. After the pilot is on board the vessel the pilot boat will return to the pilot station.

Occasionally pilot station can refer to a place on the bridge of a ship where a pilot is positioned while guiding a ship, for example a pilothouse, but this use is less common.
