= Arvo Salo =

Finnish author, journalist and politician (1932–2011)

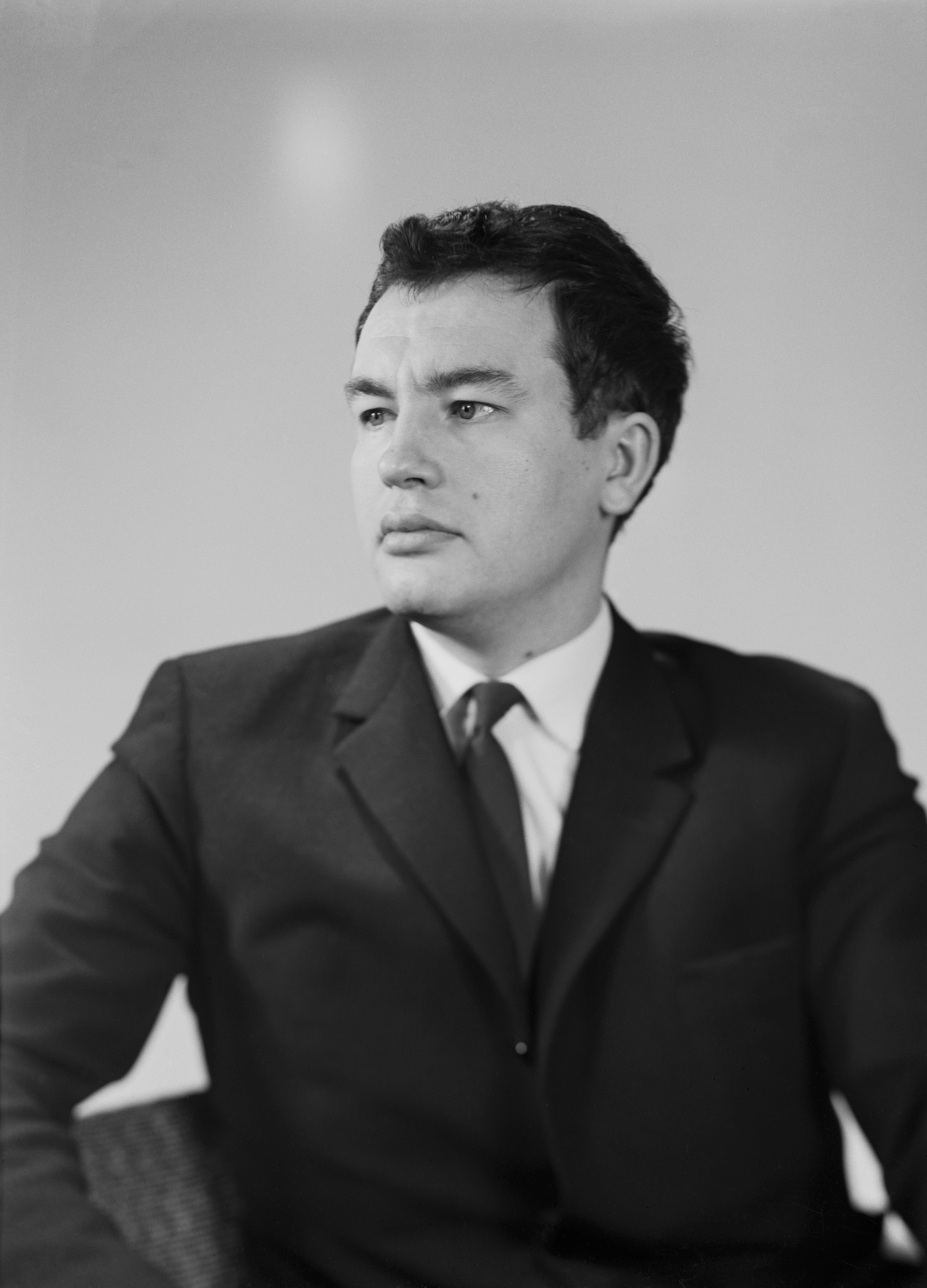
Arvo Salo in 1961.

Arvo Jaakko Henrikki Salo (2 May 1932 – 9 July 2011) was a Finnish writer, journalist and politician. He served as an MP from 1966 to 1970 and from 1979 to 1983 (Social Democratic Party) and was Minister of Education and Culture from 1982 to 1983 in Kalevi Sorsa's third cabinet.

In addition, he held various positions of trust, including the Helsinki City Council, Väinö Tanner Foundation and Workers' Educational Association. He received the honorary title of professor in 2003 and was a recipient of the Eino Leino Prize in 1964.

In Finnish politics Salo is known for his quote "kill one peasant per day" when he was talking about Finnish agriculture policy.

Salo was born and died in Merikarvia, Satakunta. In his career as a journalist, he was editor-in-chief of Ylioppilaslehti. He received the Journalist Award of Suomen Kuvalehti in 1977. He authored several notable plays, including Lapualaisooppera (1966), Mustalaisoperetti (1969), Yks perkele, yks enkeli (1985), Vallan miehet (1986), and Ouraooppera (2002).

The opera "Matilda and Nikolai", based on Mathilda Roslin's life, was written by Salo with composer Ilkka Kuusisto.
