= Oura Kei =

Japanese businesswoman

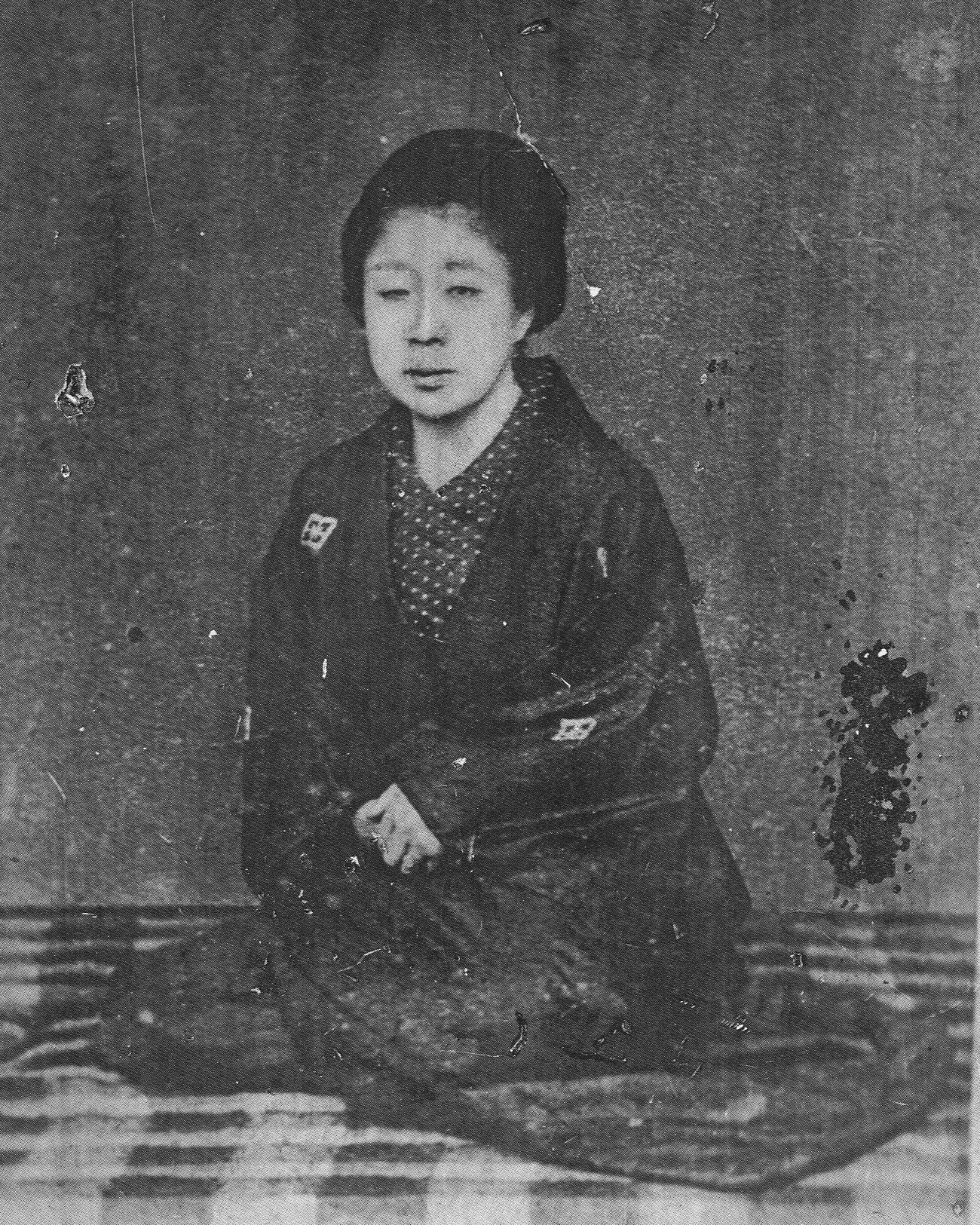
Oura Kei

Oura Kei (大浦 慶, Ōura Kei; 1828–1884) was a Japanese businesswoman. She managed a successful tea-import business with the help of her international foreign contacts. She acted as a patron of, among others, Sakamoto Ryoma. She was a figure of importance in contemporary Japan and a celebrity of sorts; during general Ulysses S. Grant's visit to Japan in 1879, she personally escorted him during an official visit to his ship.
