= Merikarvia =

Merikarvia Sastmola
- Municipality
- Merikarvian kunta Sastmola kommun
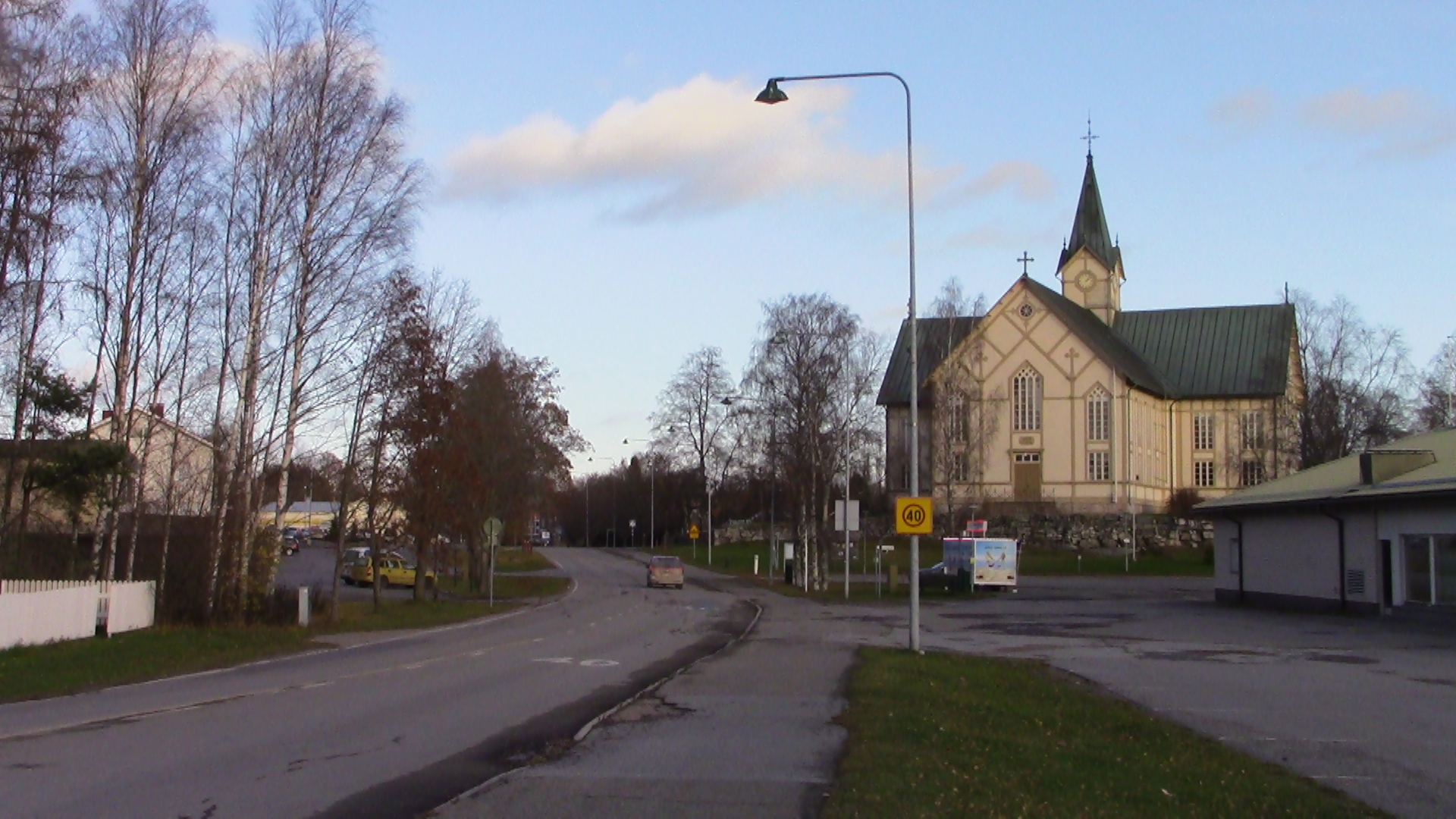
- The town center along the Kauppatie street

- Coat of arms

- Location of Merikarvia in Finland
- Interactive map of Merikarvia
- Coordinates: 61°51.5′N 021°30′E
- Country: Finland
- Region: Satakunta
- Sub-region: Pori
- Charter: 1639

Government
  - Municipal manager: Juha Vasama

Area (2018-01-01)
  - Total: 1,246.22 km^{2} (481.17 sq mi)
  - Land: 446.28 km^{2} (172.31 sq mi)
  - Water: 800.2 km^{2} (309.0 sq mi)
  - Rank: 194th largest in Finland

Population (2025-12-31)
  - Total: 2,834
  - Rank: 218th largest in Finland
  - Density: 6.35/km^{2} (16.4/sq mi)

Population by native language
  - Finnish: 95.4% (official)
  - Swedish: 0.4%
  - Others: 4.1%

Population by age
  - 0 to 14: 13.9%
  - 15 to 64: 50.6%
  - 65 or older: 35.5%
- Time zone: UTC+02:00 (EET)
  - Summer (DST): UTC+03:00 (EEST)
- Climate: Dfc
- Website: merikarvia.fi

Merikarvia (Finnish: [ˈmeriˌkɑrʋiɑ]; Swedish: Sastmola) is a municipality in Finland. It is located in the Satakunta region. The neighboring municipalities are Isojoki, Kristinestad, Pomarkku, Pori and Siikainen.

The municipality has a population of 3,169 (2024) and it covers an area of 1,246.22 square kilometres (481.17 sq mi), of which 800.2 km^{2} (309.0 sq mi) is water. The population density is 6.35 inhabitants per square kilometre (16.4/sq mi).

The municipality is unilingually Finnish. The coastline was formerly Swedish-speaking. Merikarvia is known for the Oura Archipelago, which is part of the Bothnian Sea National Park.

== History ==
The area has been inhabited since as early as 1800 BC. There are grave sites from the Bronze and Iron Ages within the municipality. Most of the cairns are located in Tuorila village located east of the municipal center.

The area of Merikarvia was initially held by the people of Sastamala (Karkku and Tyrvää) as hunting grounds, which is the origin of the Swedish name Sastmola. The name was first mentioned in 1303 as Sastamall.

The birth of the earliest villages in Merikarvia - Kasala, Riispyy, Alakylä, Ylikylä and Köörtilä - is dated to between the 13th and 14th centuries.

Merikarvia was a part of the Ulvila parish until 1639. Municipal administration was adopted in 1865. Siikainen became a chapel community under Merikarvia in 1772 and was separated from Merikarvia as a parish in 1861 and as a municipality in 1871.

The first church in Merikarvia was built in 1776 and was named after the queen consort of Sweden at the time, Sofia Magdalena. The church, still in use today, was finished in 1899.

As a coastal municipality, Merikarvia largely lived from the sea until modern times. Fishing, sawmills and shipyards were common businesses until the end of the 19th century.

=== Language and dialect ===
Like neighboring Ahlainen (Vittisbofjärd), Merikarvia was originally predominantly Swedish-speaking due to the Swedish settlement in the area during the Middle Ages. The Swedish language mostly disappeared from the area in the early 20th century, mainly remaining in the village of Kasala (Kasaböle) near the border with Sideby. Kasala became a majority Finnish-speaking village between the 20th and 21st centuries.

A Swedish-language school was active in Kasala from 1897 until 1967.

The Finnish dialect of Merikarvia is a southwestern dialect, similar to the other dialects of northern Satakunta. The dialects of Merikarvia and Ahlainen are among the few dialects of Finnish where the sound /d/ is used in native words (e.g. lähde), as in standard Finnish. Most other dialects of the area use /r/ in its place.

== Politics ==
Results of the 2011 Finnish parliamentary election in Merikarvia:

- Centre Party 35.7%
- True Finns 23.7%
- Social Democratic Party 18.6%
- National Coalition Party 11.3%
- Left Alliance 6.1%
- Christian Democrats 2.6%
- Green League 1.7%

== Sights ==
- Lankoski rapids
- The church of Merikarvia
- Oura Archipelago
- Krookka marina
