= Finnish Ecumenical Council =

Finnish Christian ecumenical organization

- Suomen ekumeeninen neuvosto
- Formation: 1917
- Type: Christian ecumenical organization
- Headquarters: Eteläranta 8, Helsinki, Finland
- Official language: Finnish, Swedish

Finnish Ecumenical Council (Finnish: Suomen Ekumeeninen Neuvosto) is an ecumenical Christian organization in Finland, established in 1917.

== Member denominations ==
Following denominations were members in 2023:

- Evangelical Lutheran Church of Finland
- Finnish Orthodox Church
- Evangelical Free Church of Finland
- Catholic Church in Finland
- Swedish Speaking Baptist Union of Finland
- Salvation Army in Finland
- United Methodist Church in Finland (Finnish-speaking)
- United Methodist Church in Finland (Swedish-speaking)
- Mission Covenant Church
- Anglican Church in Finland
- International Evangelical Church in Finland
