= Isojoki =

Isojoki Storå
- Municipality
- Isojoen kunta Storå kommun
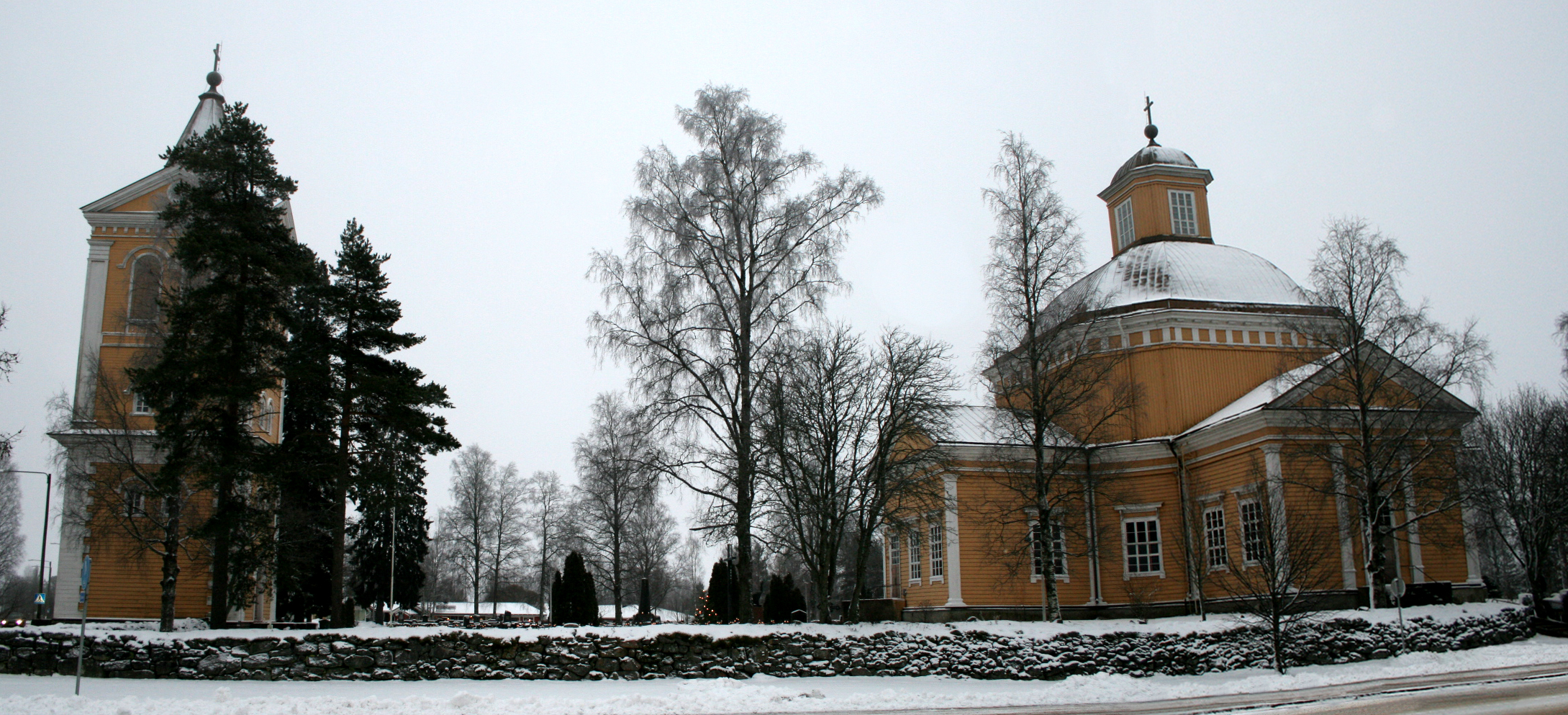
- Isojoki church and bell tower

- Coat of arms

- Location of Isojoki in Finland
- Interactive map of Isojoki
- Coordinates: 62°06′50″N 21°57′30″E
- Country: Finland
- Region: South Ostrobothnia
- Sub-region: Suupohja
- Charter: 1855

Government
  - Municipal manager: Juha Herrala

Area (2018-01-01)
  - Total: 647.43 km^{2} (249.97 sq mi)
  - Land: 642.4 km^{2} (248.0 sq mi)
  - Water: 5.05 km^{2} (1.95 sq mi)
  - Rank: 134th largest in Finland

Population (2025-12-31)
  - Total: 1,771
  - Rank: 265th largest in Finland
  - Density: 2.76/km^{2} (7.1/sq mi)

Population by native language
  - Finnish: 94% (official)
  - Swedish: 0.9%
  - Others: 5.1%

Population by age
  - 0 to 14: 11.3%
  - 15 to 64: 55.1%
  - 65 or older: 33.7%
- Time zone: UTC+02:00 (EET)
  - Summer (DST): UTC+03:00 (EEST)
- Website: isojoki.fi

Isojoki (Swedish: Storå; lit. "Big River") is a municipality of Finland. It is part of the South Ostrobothnia region. The city of Pori is located 83 kilometres (52 mi) south of Isojoki. Neighbouring municipalities are Honkajoki, Karijoki, Kauhajoki, Kristinestad, Merikarvia and Siikainen. The population of Isojoki is 1,771 (31 December 2025). The municipality covers an area of 642.4 km^{2} (248.0 sq mi), of which 5.05 km^{2} (1.95 sq mi) is inland water (1 January 2018). The population density is 2.76/km^{2} (7.1/sq mi). The municipality is unilingually Finnish.

Although the area is not very high, one of the highest hills of southern Finland is located here (Lauhanvuori). Many Finns from this area have emigrated to Minnesota, in the USA, as well as Michigan.

Industry: wood, potato, machinery

Tourism: Lauhanvuori National Park (hotel, viewtower, big smoke sauna, historical nature with many relics from ice-age)

Nature: Mostly Forest, swamp and agriculture
