= Tampere Baptist Church =

- Tampere Baptist Congregation
- Finnish: Tampereen baptistiseurakunta
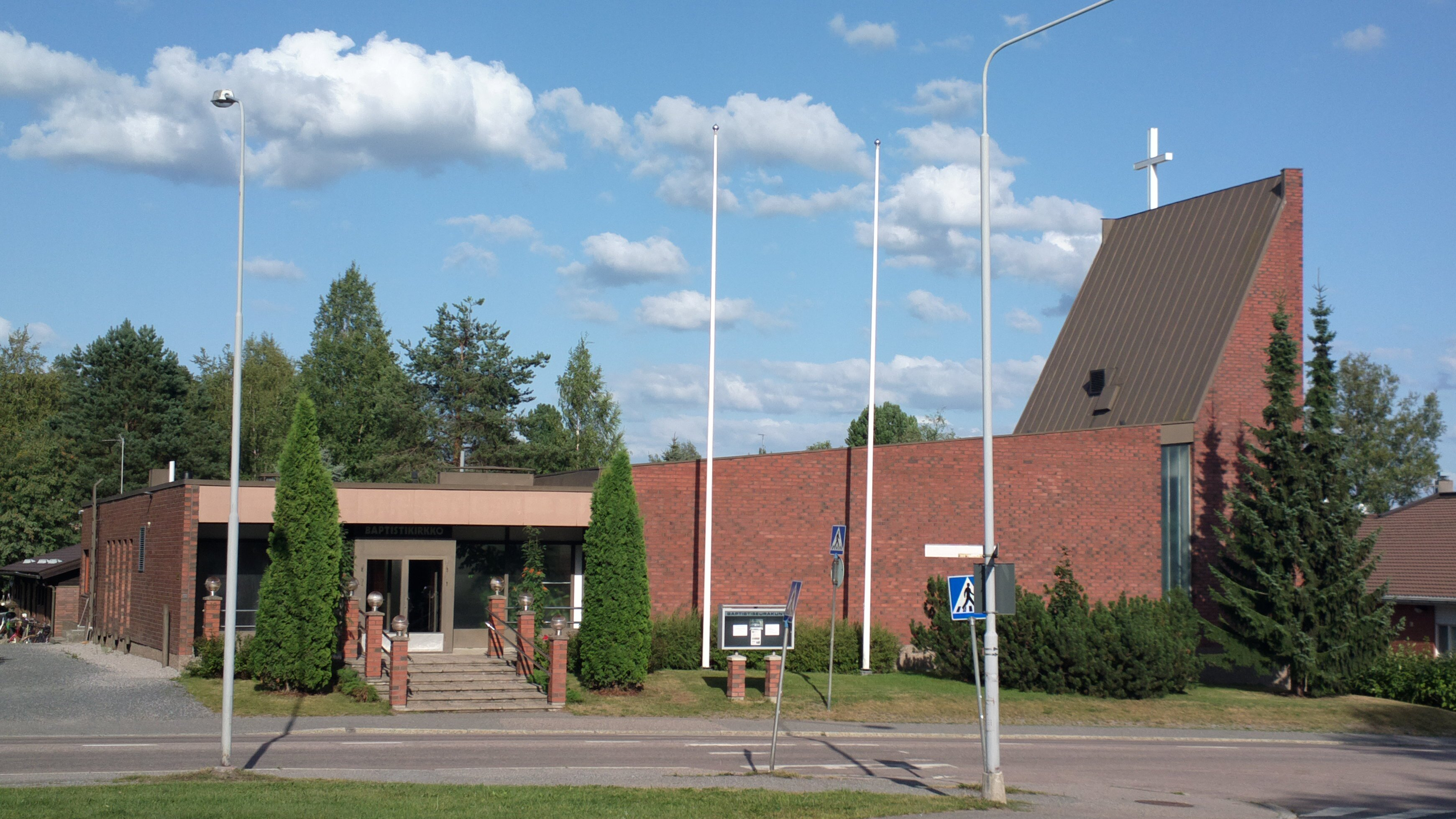
- Tampere Baptist Church
- 61°29′57.06″N 23°49′12.51″E
- Location: Kissanmaa, Tampere
- Country: Finland
- Website: tampere.baptisti.fi

History
- Founded: 21 December 1890; 135 years ago

Administration
- Diocese: Finnish Baptist Church

The Tampere Baptist Church (also known as the Tampere Baptist Congregation; Finnish: Tampereen baptistiseurakunta) is a Finnish Baptist congregation in Tampere, Finland. It belongs to the Finnish Baptist Church and was founded in 1890. The current congregation building is located in the Kissanmaa district of Tampere.

== History ==
The Baptist influence in Tampere began in 1888 with the visit of Johan Liljestrand from Vaasa. The group that participated in Liljestrand's meeting was founding a Baptist church in 1890, of which Liljestrand was chosen as the first chairman and preacher. The congregation was officially founded on 21 December 1890. Less than a year later, inventor Jonas Andersson came to faith and offered the hall of his apartment to the congregation. Andersson became the preacher and leader of the congregation, serving in the years 1891–1921. The congregation in Tampere soon became the center of Finnish baptism.

The congregation got its first chapel at Pinninkatu 29 in the Tammela district at the turn of the century. In addition to the congregation's work, it was decided to establish a sewing circle and a Sunday school in 1894. In 1889, the Sarastus youth club of the Baptist congregation was founded, which grew into a 72-member association in ten years. The Tampere congregation did rural work in Forssa, Toijala, Viiala, Ryttylä and Kangasala, later also in Vesilahti, Hauho and Visuvesi.

At the beginning of the 20th century, many members joined the congregation. Up to 300 children attended the congregation's Sunday school on Sundays. Many came to faith and joined the church. Events were also held regularly in the surrounding municipalities. In Ryttylä, there was successful sewing circle work, and a spiritual congregation was founded under the Tampere congregation in 1909. The Baptist congregations in Multia and Keuruu also got their start from the work of the Tampere congregation.

== See also ==
- Baptists in Finland

== Sources ==
=== Further reading ===
- Huhtala, Raili (1980). Tampereen baptistiseurakunann 90-vuotistoimintakatsaus 1890–1980 (in Finnish). Tampere: Tampereen baptistiseurakunta.
- Toivola, Veikko (1983). Suomalaisen baptismin tienraivaajia (in Finnish). Tampere: Kodin Ystävä. ISBN 951-99490-1-1.
- Lohikko, Anneli (2006). Baptismi Suomessa 1856–2006 (in Finnish). Tampere: Kharis Oy. ISBN 951-97895-4-5.
