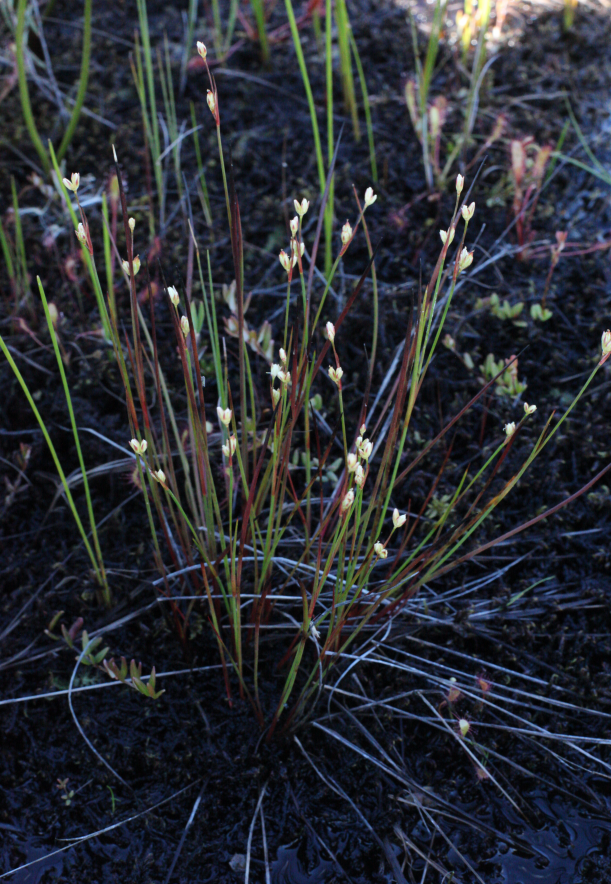
- In a dark mire in Siberia
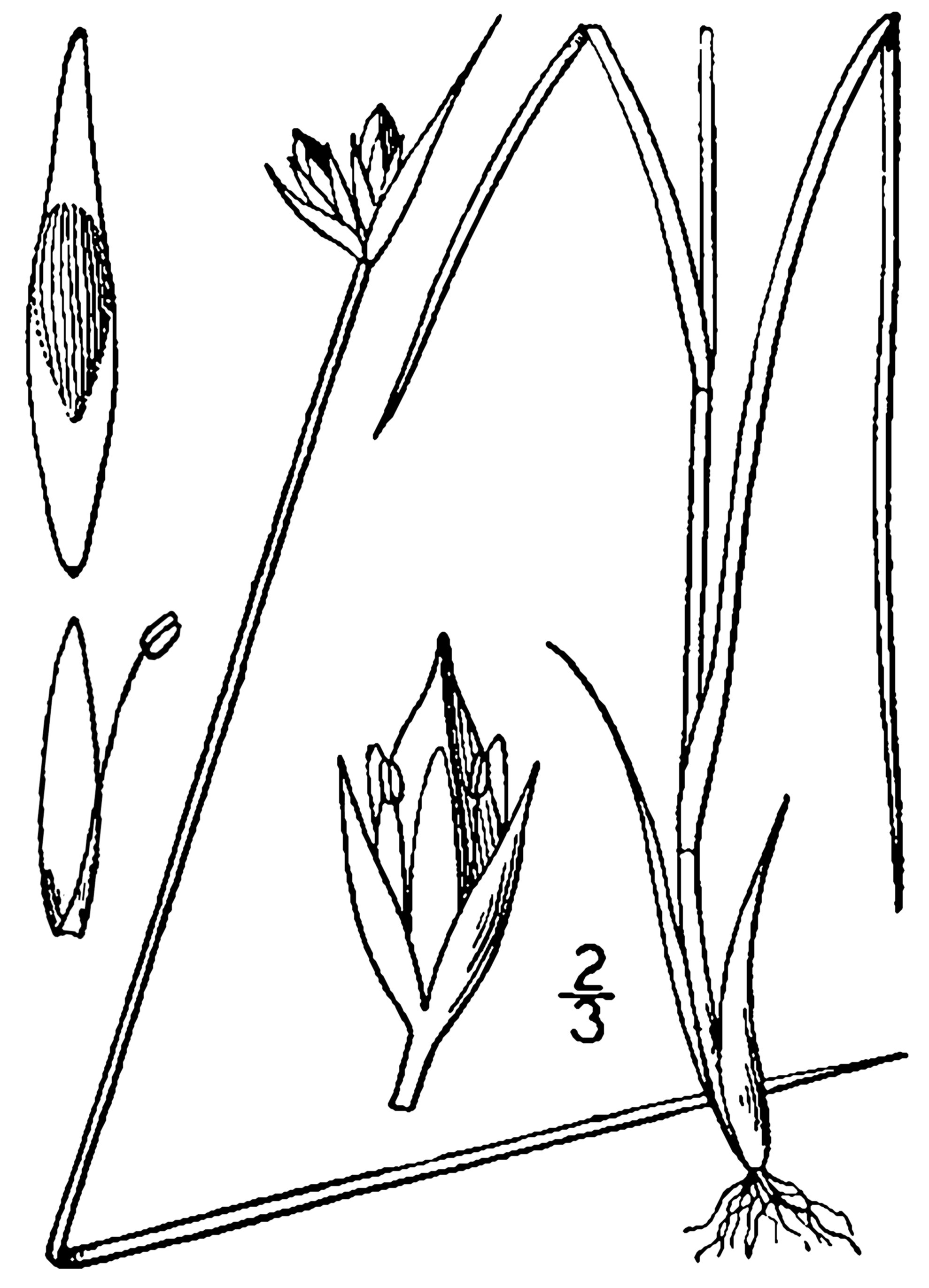
- Botanical illustration

Scientific classification
- Kingdom: Plantae
- Clade: Embryophytes
- Clade: Tracheophytes
- Clade: Spermatophytes
- Clade: Angiosperms
- Clade: Monocots
- Clade: Commelinids
- Order: Poales
- Family: Juncaceae
- Genus: Juncus
- Species: J. stygius

Binomial name
- Juncus stygius L.

Synonyms
- Juncus stygius var. americanus Buchenau; Scirpus stygius (L.) Ferber ex J.Fleisch.

= Juncus stygius =

Species of flowering plant

Juncus stygius, called the bog rush and moor rush, is a species of flowering plant in the genus Juncus, with a high circumboreal distribution, never reaching further south than Switzerland, Korea and Upstate New York.

== Subtaxa ==
The following subspecies are currently accepted:

- Juncus stygius subsp. americanus (Buchenau) Hultén – Korea, Pacific coastal Russia, Alaska, Canada, United States
- Juncus stygius subsp. stygius – Eurasia less Korea and Pacific coastal Russia
