= Asami Oura =

Japanese water polo player

Personal information
- Born: November 14, 1962 (age 62)

Sport
- Sport: Water polo

Asami Oura (大浦 朝美, Ōura Asami, born 14 November 1962) is a Japanese former water polo player who competed in the 1984 Summer Olympics.
