= Kauhajoki =

- Town
- Kauhajoen kaupunki Kauhajoki stad
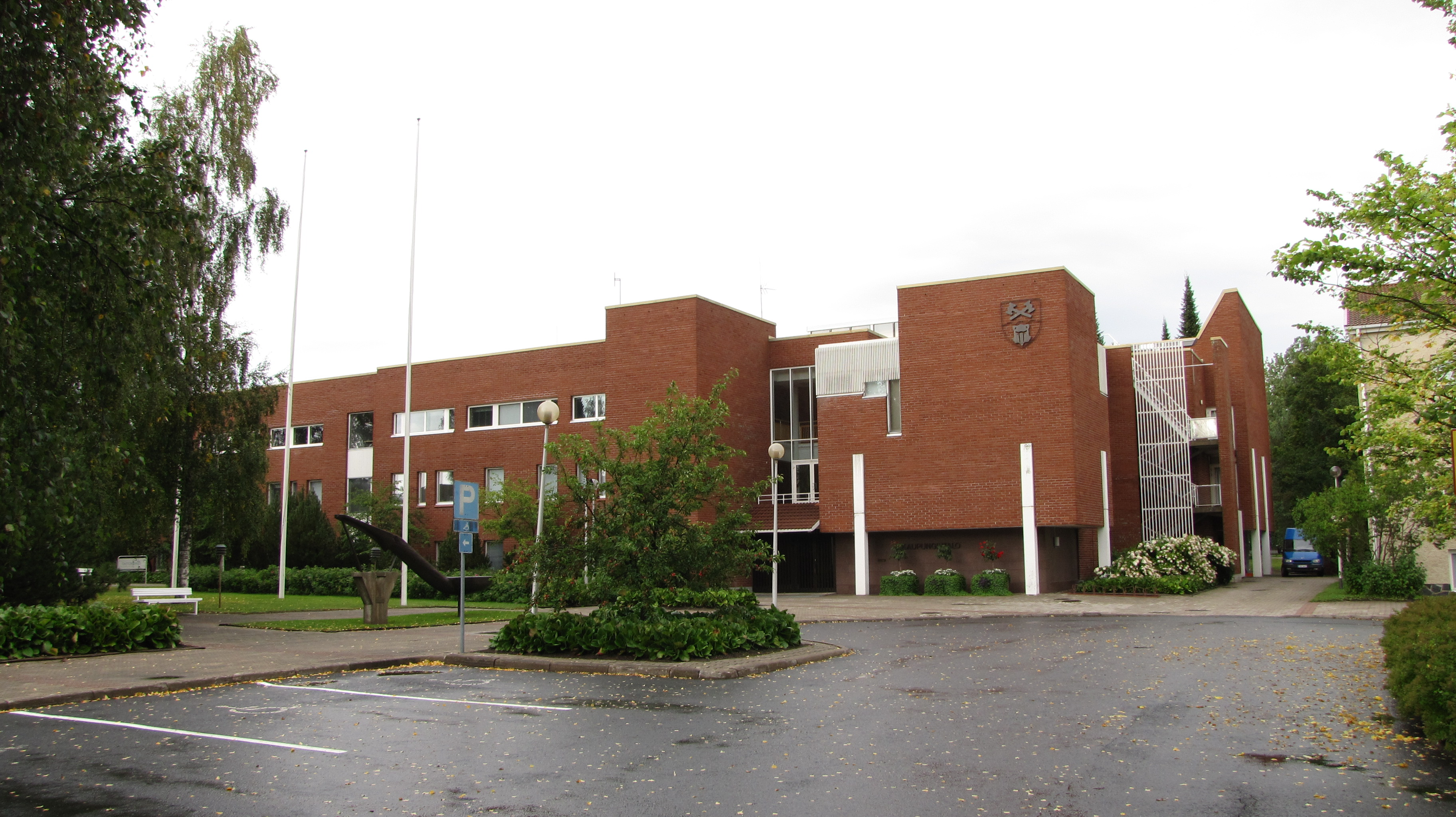
- Kauhajoki Town Hall

- Coat of arms

- Location of Kauhajoki in Finland
- Interactive map of Kauhajoki
- Coordinates: 62°25′55″N 22°10′46″E
- Country: Finland
- Region: South Ostrobothnia
- Sub-region: Suupohja
- Charter: 1868
- Town privileges: 2001

Government
  - Town manager: Niku Latva-Pukkila

Area (2018-01-01)
  - Total: 1,315.54 km^{2} (507.93 sq mi)
  - Land: 1,298.98 km^{2} (501.54 sq mi)
  - Water: 16.46 km^{2} (6.36 sq mi)
  - Rank: 55th largest in Finland

Population (2025-12-31)
  - Total: 12,429
  - Rank: 81st largest in Finland
  - Density: 9.57/km^{2} (24.8/sq mi)
  - Demonym: Kauhajokinen (Finnish)

Population by native language
  - Finnish: 95.3% (official)
  - Swedish: 0.4%
  - Others: 4.4%

Population by age
  - 0 to 14: 15.1%
  - 15 to 64: 57%
  - 65 or older: 27.9%
- Time zone: UTC+02:00 (EET)
  - Summer (DST): UTC+03:00 (EEST)
- Website: kauhajoki.fi

Kauhajoki (Finnish pronunciation: [ˈkɑu̯hɑˌjoki]; lit. “Scoop River”) is a town and municipality of Finland. It is located in the province of Western Finland and is part of the South Ostrobothnia region, 59 kilometres (37 mi) southwest of the city of Seinäjoki. The population of Kauhajoki is 12,429 (31 December 2025) and the municipality covers an area of 1,298.98 km^{2} (501.54 sq mi) of which 16.46 km^{2} (6.36 sq mi) is inland water (1 January 2018). The population density is 9.57/km^{2} (24.8/sq mi). The town is unilingually Finnish.

The neighboring municipalities of Kauhajoki are Isojoki in the southwest, Kankaanpää in the south, Karijoki in the west, Karvia in the southeast, Kurikka in the north and Teuva in the west. Kauhajoki is the center of the Suupohja sub-region.

== Geography ==
Most of Kauhajoki is located north of the Suomenselkä's watershed. Most of the municipal area is a gently sloping plains to the west and north. On the border of the Kauhajoki and Isojoki is Lauhanvuori, one of the highest points in Western Finland, which rises 231 meters above sea level. However, the highest point of Lauhanvuori is on the Isojoki side, a few tens of meters from the Kauhajoki border. Lauhanvuori national park and an other national park located in Kauhajoki, Kauhaneva-Pohjankangas, belong to a Unesco Global Geopark Lauhanvuori-Hämeenkangas.

=== Climate ===
Climate data for Kauhajoki (1991-2020 normals, extremes 1993–present)
Month	Jan	Feb	Mar	Apr	May	Jun	Jul	Aug	Sep	Oct	Nov	Dec	Year
Record high °C (°F)	7.7 (45.9)	7.6 (45.7)	14.7 (58.5)	23.2 (73.8)	28.2 (82.8)	31.6 (88.9)	32.6 (90.7)	30.5 (86.9)	26.0 (78.8)	19.0 (66.2)	12.8 (55.0)	9.3 (48.7)	32.6 (90.7)
Daily mean °C (°F)	−5.6 (21.9)	−6.1 (21.0)	−2.9 (26.8)	2.9 (37.2)	8.9 (48.0)	13.4 (56.1)	16.0 (60.8)	14.3 (57.7)	9.6 (49.3)	4.1 (39.4)	−0.2 (31.6)	−3.3 (26.1)	4.3 (39.7)
Record low °C (°F)	−34.2 (−29.6)	−34.0 (−29.2)	−29.7 (−21.5)	−17.2 (1.0)	−6.7 (19.9)	−3.1 (26.4)	0.6 (33.1)	−3.3 (26.1)	−6.8 (19.8)	−16.8 (1.8)	−26.2 (−15.2)	−32.1 (−25.8)	−34.2 (−29.6)
Average precipitation mm (inches)	38 (1.5)	31 (1.2)	27 (1.1)	27 (1.1)	39 (1.5)	60 (2.4)	71 (2.8)	72 (2.8)	54 (2.1)	60 (2.4)	48 (1.9)	47 (1.9)	574 (22.6)
Average precipitation days	10	8	7	7	7	9	10	10	8	10	10	10	106
Source 1: FMI normals for Finland 1991-2020
Source 2: Record highs and lows

== History ==
Permanent settlement in the Kauhajoki area began in the 16th century and in 1584 chapel was built in Kauhajoki.

When the Soviet Union attacked Finland in the Winter War, in early December 1939 Parliament was evacuated and the legislature temporarily relocated to Kauhajoki, a town in western Finland far away from the frontline. The parliament held 34 plenary sessions in Kauhajoki, with the last on 12 February 1940.

=== 2008 vocational college shooting ===
On 23 September 2008, a school shooting at a vocational college in the city left 11 dead, including the gunman, and another woman wounded. The incident was the second school shooting in less than a year in Finland, the other being the Jokela school shooting in November 2007, in which nine people including the gunman died. Before that, only one other school shooting had taken place in the country's history, in Rauma in 1989, leaving two people dead.

== Demographics ==
Kauhajoki has the highest proportion of Finnish Kale in Finland, with an estimated 5% of the population being Finnish Kale. The town is linguistically homogenous, with 97% speaking Finnish. Kauhajoki has the highest proportion of Hungarians in Finland, with 0.6% of the population speaking Hungarian.

== Culture ==
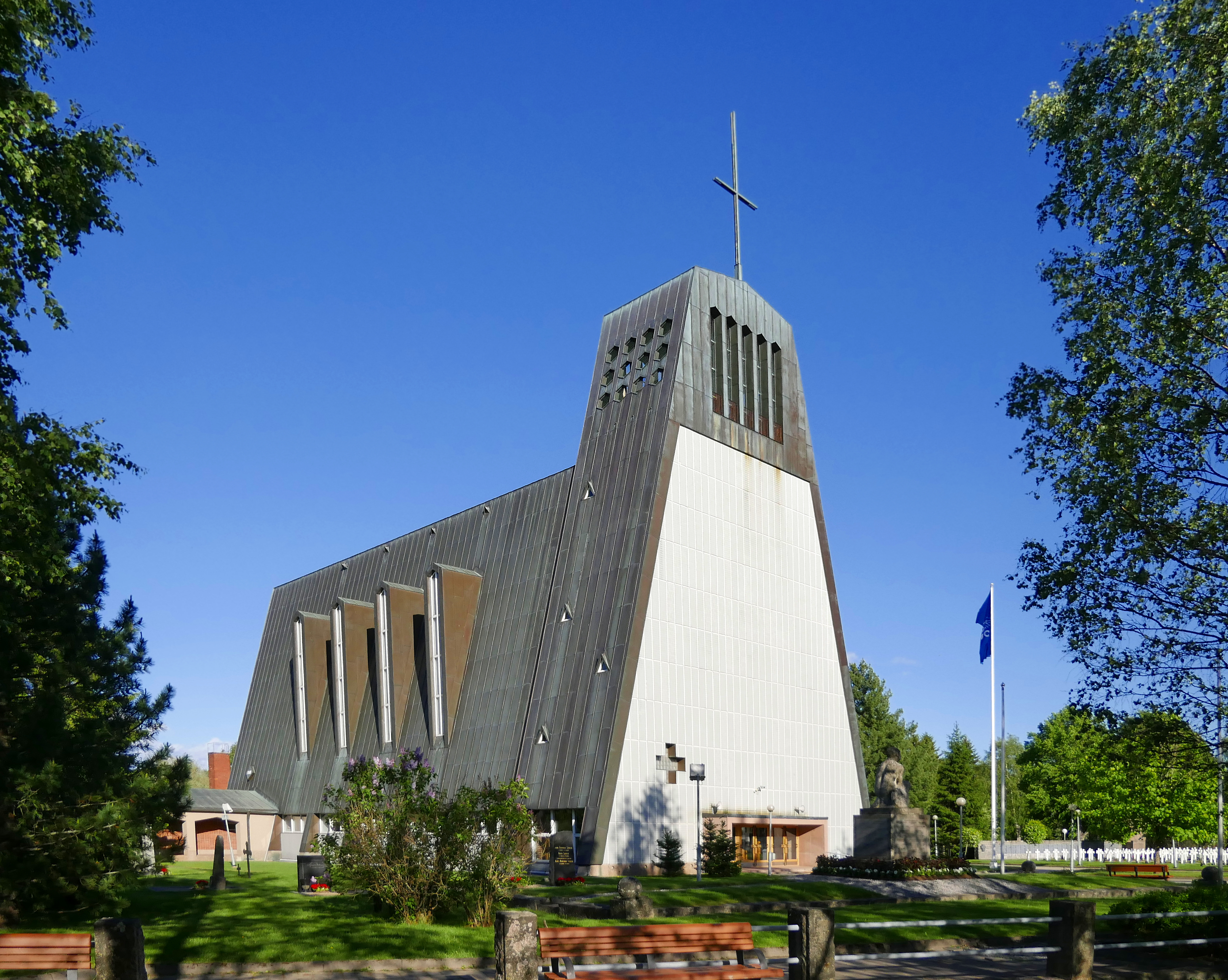
Kauhajoki church

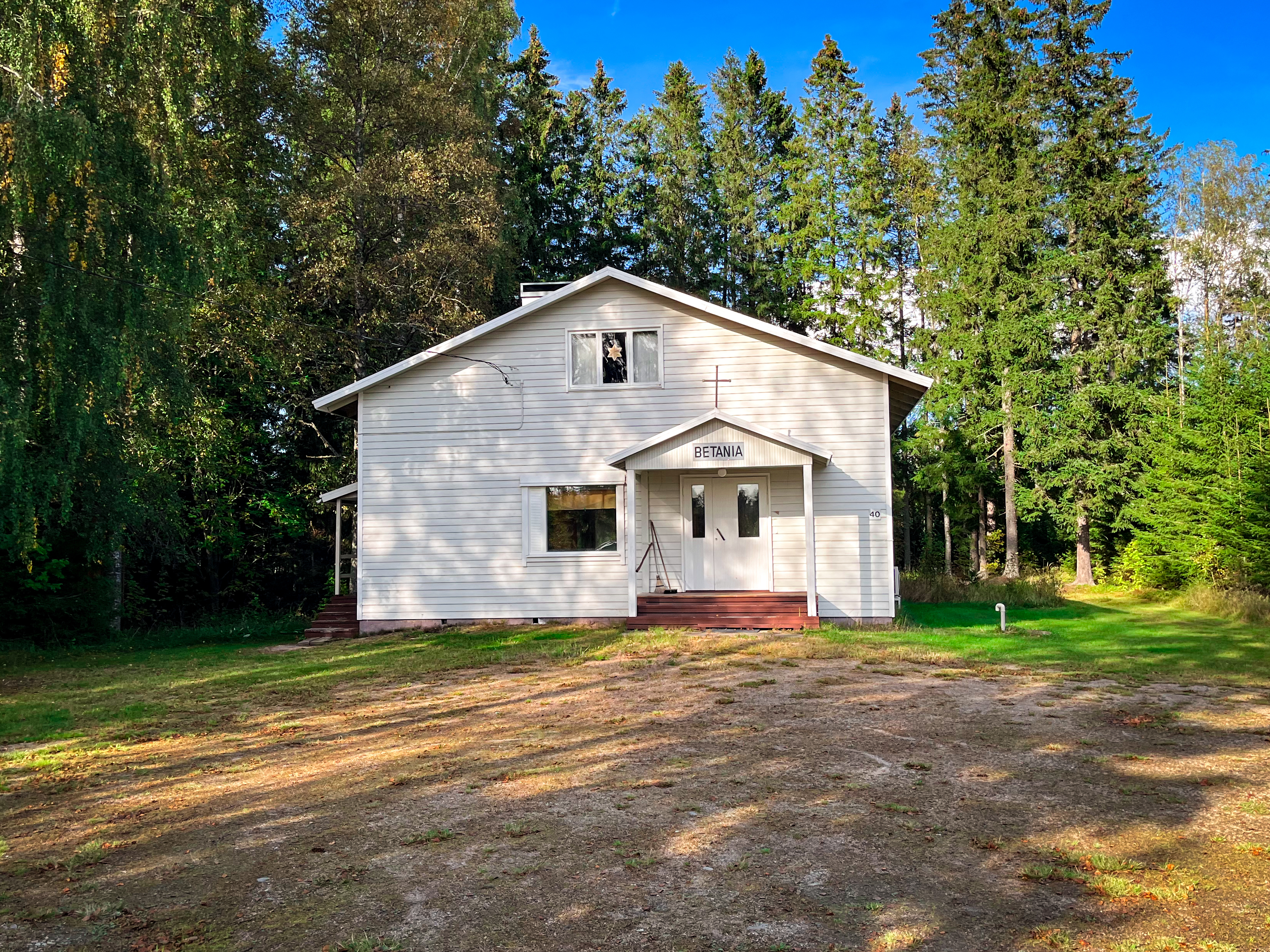
A small Kauhajoki Baptist Church in the village of Kainasto

=== Food ===
In the 1980s, the traditional parish dished of Kauhajoki was named sinsalla (a local name of rosolli) and charred Baltic herrings.

=== Sports ===
Today sports in Kauhajoki is mostly famous for the basketball team Karhu Basket. Karhu Basket has been the most successful team in Finland for years winning the national league in 2018, 2019 and 2022. In the season 2020-21 Karhu Basket was second and in the season 2019-20 the season was interrupted because of the Covid-19 pandemic. The home venue of Karhu Basket is the IKH Areena. IKH Areena can hold 3500 spectators, which is more than a quarter of the inhabitants of Kauhajoki.

Some internationally successful Kauhajokian sports figures include:

- Jouko Salomäki, the 1984 Olympic Champion in Greco-Roman wrestling, was born in Kauhajoki.
- Kaarlo Maaninka, the 1980 Olympic silver and bronze medalist in long distance running, lives in Kauhajoki. He also represented the town's sports club Kauhajoen Karhu during his career.
- Vesa Hietalahti, the 2003 World Championship silver medalist in biathlon, was born and lives in Kauhajoki. He also represented the town's sports club Kauhajoen Karhu throughout his career.
- Heli Koivula Kruger, the 2002 European Championship silver medalist in triple jump, was born in Kauhajoki. She also represented the town's sports club Kauhajoen Karhu throughout her career.
- Jani Haapamäki, the 2009 European Champion in Greco-Roman wrestling, was born in Kauhajoki. He also represents the town's sports club Kauhajoen Karhu.

== See also ==
- Kauhajoki Airfield
