= Baptists in Finland =

Evangelical church in Finland

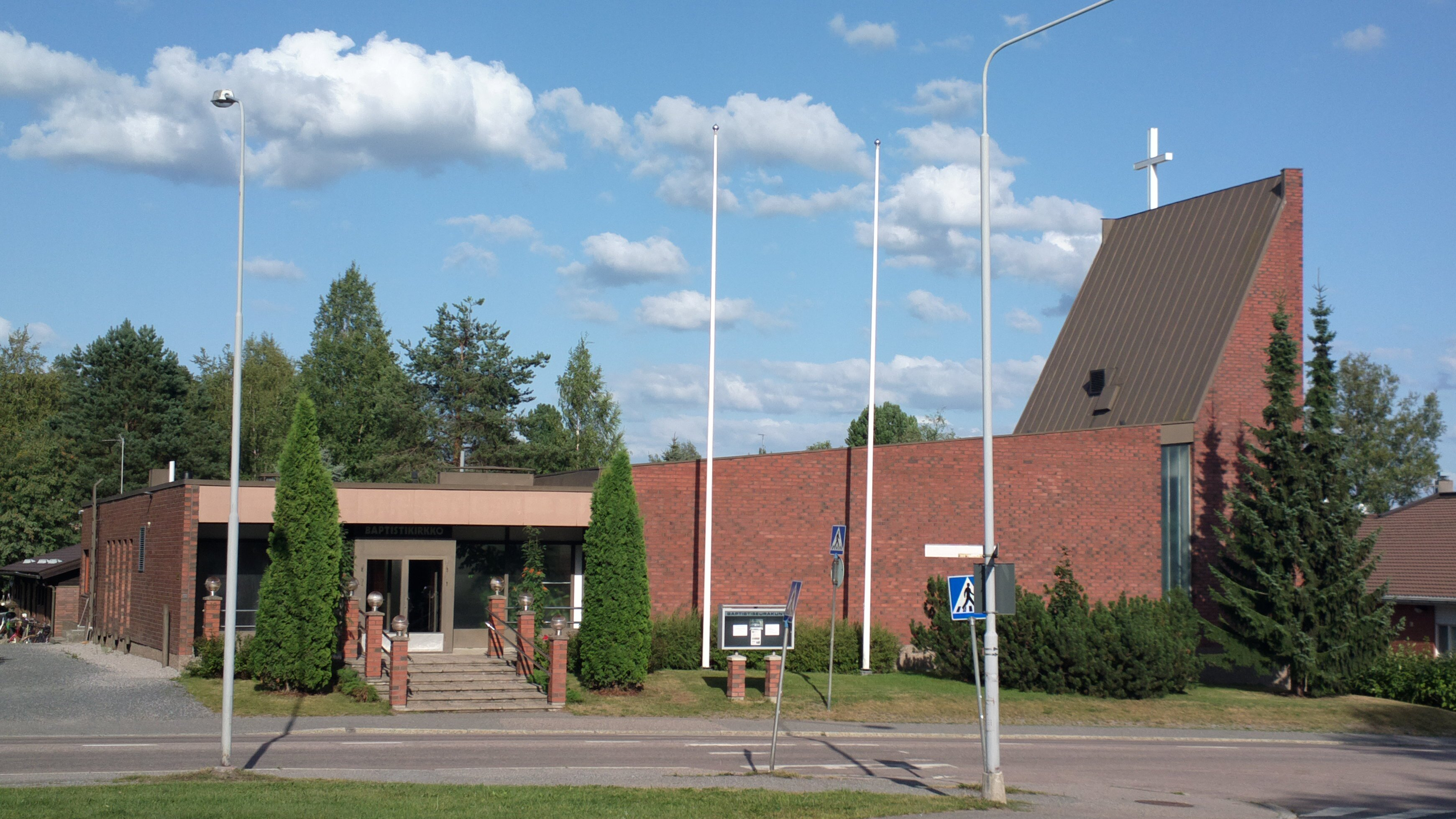
Finnish-speaking Baptist church in Kissanmaa, Tampere.

Baptists in Finland have existed since the middle of the 19th century. They are part of the Baptist branch of evangelical Christianity and belong to three different Finnish church associations. Swedish-speaking Finns formed the Swedish Baptist Union of Finland (Swedish: Finlands svenska baptistsamfund), while Finnish-speaking Baptists are united in the Finnish Baptist Church (Finnish: Suomen Baptistikirkko); two Finnish congregations are a part of the Seventh Day Baptists. In addition, a few independent Baptist churches exist, including Grace Baptist Church (Finnish: Armon Baptistiseurakunta) in Tampere. The congregation was formerly known as Perinteinen Baptistiseurakunta in Finnish and International Baptist Church in English. Agape International Baptist Church in Pedersöre is also among the independent Baptist churches.

== History ==
=== Beginnings in Åland ===
After a request for preachers to revive the faith of the local church congregation, preacher Karl Justin Mathias Möllersvärd was sent by the Evangelical Alliance in Stockholm, Sweden, in 1854. Möllersvärd was the first to preach Baptist teachings in Finland and sparked a revival, though he did not stay long due to fierce opposition.

The movement, however, continued to grow. In 1855, a resident of Åland returned from Stockholm with material about Baptist beliefs written by former Lutheran priest Anders Wiberg. Farmer Johan Erik Östling was inspired to travel to Stockholm the next year and be baptized, making him the first Finnish Baptist.

Several baptisms were performed in Föglö the following year; they joined together with those who had already been baptized in Sweden to found the first Finnish Baptist church in 1856 in Föglö, Åland.

At that time, Finland was still part of the Russian Empire. The Evangelical Lutheran Church of Finland dominated religious life and tried by all means to hinder the emergence and spread of free churches. The Conventicle Act, which outlawed religious meetings other than those of the state church as a means of stopping the growing Pietist movement, was enacted in 1726. A number of Baptists faced hearings at the cathedral in Turku to defend their faith before the Lutheran clergy in 1859. The movement happened to unexpectedly capture the interest of Lutheran priest Henrik Heikel, who spoke with the Baptists to learn more about their beliefs. He himself did not convert, but his interest was to play a key role in the church's spread.

Of the event, Wiberg wrote, "As the poor Ålanders were leaving the consistory, Prof. [Henrik] Heikel asked them in a friendly manner, to call at his house. They thought, what does it mean? Does he intend to make some further inquiries, in order to make the sentence against us more sure? In calling, however, they were happily disappointed. The professor entertained them with food, and treated them in the most friendly manner. His children, then young, were witnesses to all this, and they received a favorable impression of the Baptists which has followed them up to the present moment."

=== The movement's growth ===
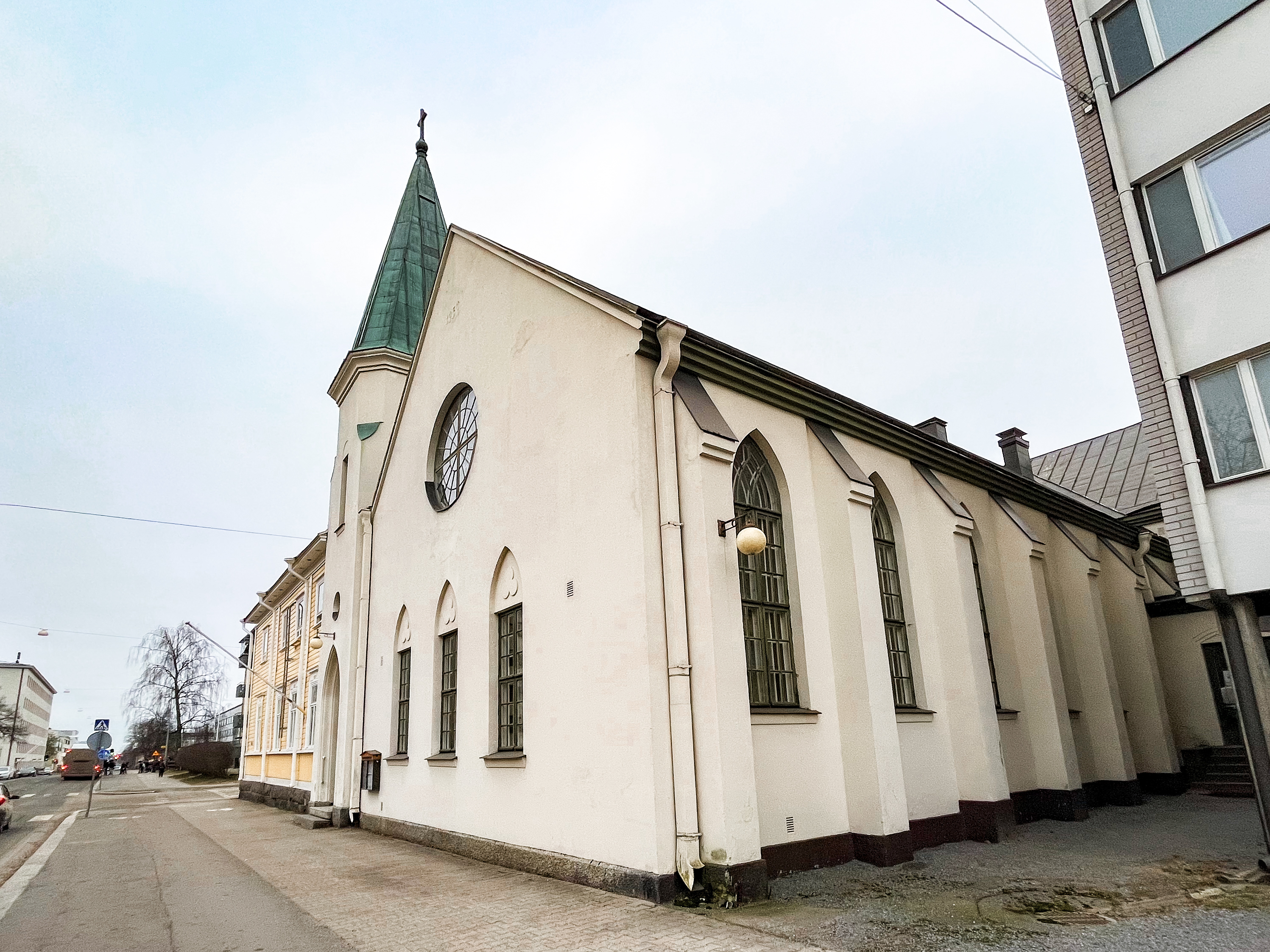
The Swedish Baptist Church of Vaasa in November 2022

Heikel moved to mainland Finland with his family in 1860. Pedersöre in Ostrobothnia was to become their home as he was installed as priest of the Lutheran church there. The family maintained contact with the Baptists in Åland; after his death in 1867, his son Viktor and daughter Anna were baptized as Baptists by Wiberg in Stockholm. Their conversions led to many more after Anna returned with literature and began to hold meetings. The family received a visit from a Baptist pastor, Adolf Herman Valén, who had been at the hearing with Heikel ten years earlier; they held meetings together and his preaching led to more conversions to the movement. He was the first Baptist to preach on the mainland. The first Baptist baptisms on the mainland were performed the same year, with Maria Ekqvist and Petter Stormåns being the first to be baptized.

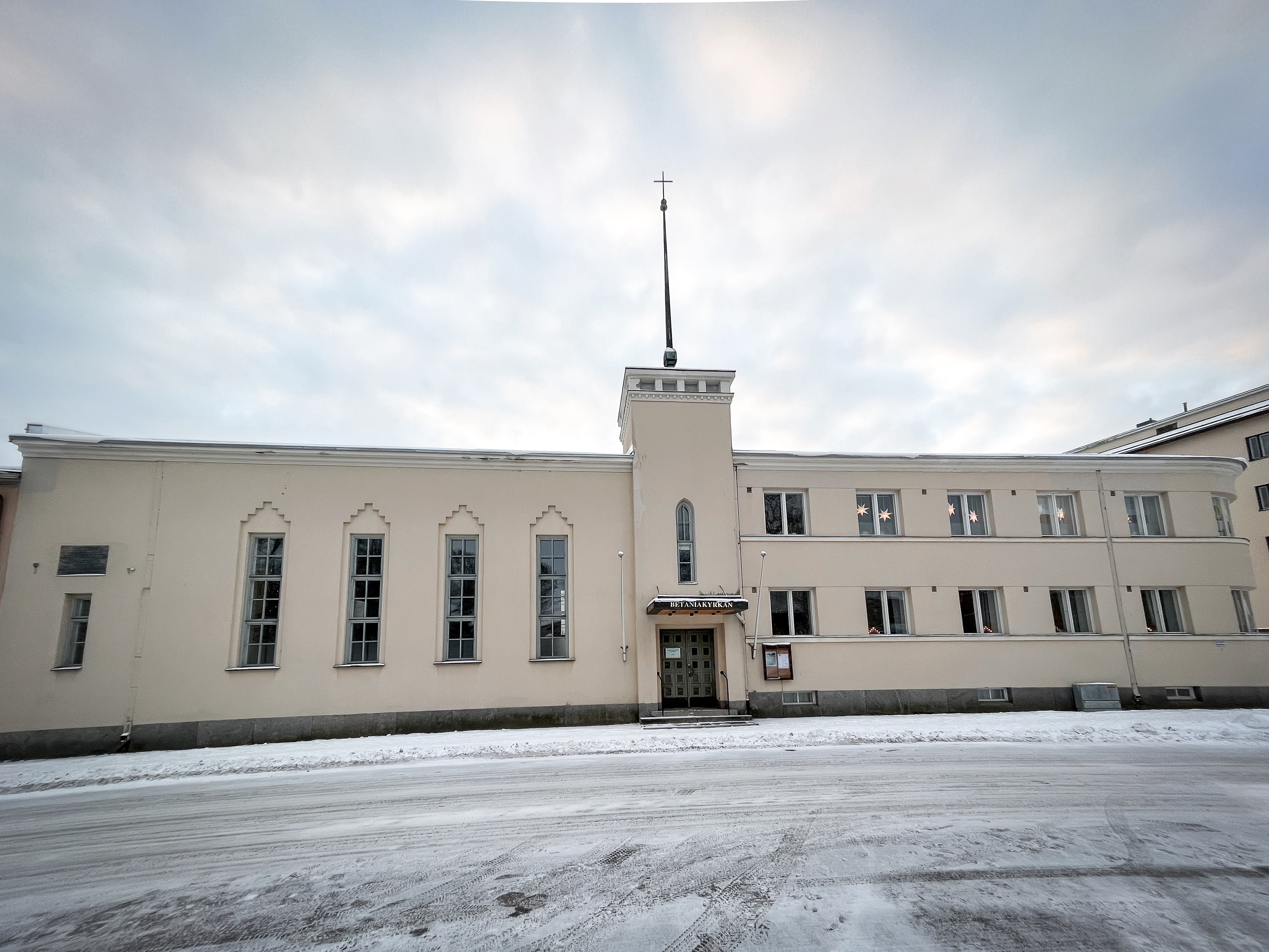
Jakobstad Bethany Church.

The movement continued to grow in the following years and a Swedish-speaking congregation was founded in Jakobstad (Finnish: Pietarsaari), near Pedersöre, in 1870, by thirteen people including four members of the Heikel family. That year, the Conventicle Act was also repealed in Finland. (In 1891 the Jakobstad Baptist church would undergo a split due to differing views, particularly over open or closed communion.) Ostrobothnia has since remained a hub of the Baptist movement in Finland. Today, the only two Swedish-speaking Baptist churches outside the region are located in Helsinki and Karis.

The Baptist movement did not take long to reach the Finnish-speaking population as well. Some of the people who had been baptized in Ostrobothnia were bilingual and began to preach in Finnish, founding several Finnish-speaking churches. Henrik Nars, from Purmo, was one such preacher. In 1870, a solely Finnish-speaking sailor named Henriksson evangelized in the southwestern Finnish countryside of Satakunta after being converted in England. The Luvia Baptist congregation near Pori (Swedish: Björneborg) traces its origin, also dated 1870, to his work.

In 1871, John Hymander, also a Finnish speaker, who had been a priest in the Lutheran church for 40 years, left his position in Parikkala in South Karelia and was baptized by the Baptists in Stockholm. He was known to have had a friendly relationship with the Heikel family. Several in Hymander's family soon followed in baptism and a Baptist church was founded in Parikkala in 1872.

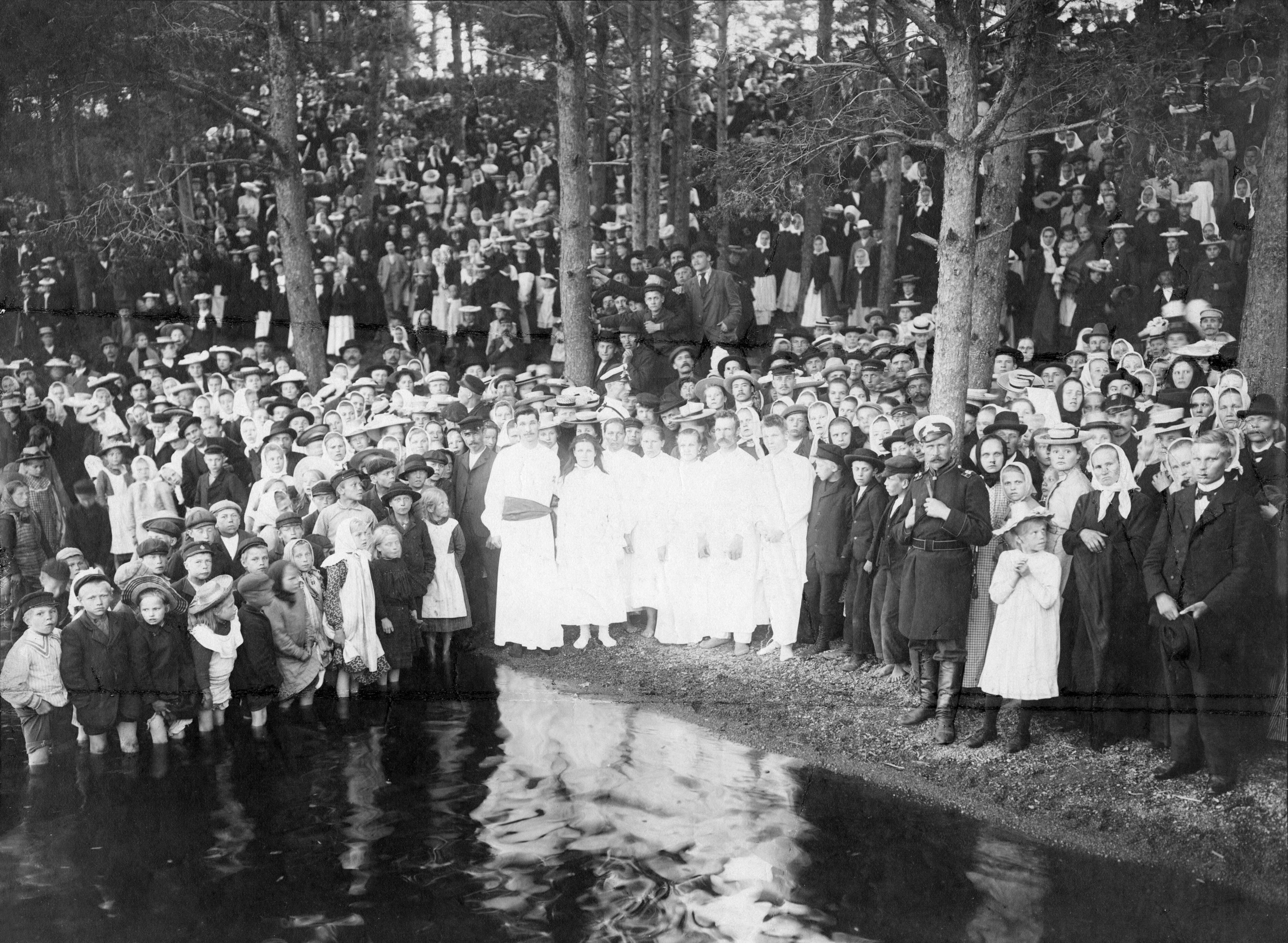
The first Baptist baptism of Tampere took place on September 16, 1886 in Kaupinoja, when about twenty people were baptized.

More Finnish-speaking Baptist churches were soon founded in Jurva (1879), Turku (1884), Kuopio (1886), Tampere (1890), and Ylistaro (1894).

Reverend Erik Jansson was also a key figure in the church's spread beginning in the 1880s. After joining evangelist Dwight L. Moody's church in Chicago, Jansson returned to Finland and later joined the Baptist church in 1881. He became pastor of the Petalax Baptist Church, which at times had over 400 members and baptized 1000 people.

After the Swedish Baptists had exclusively supported the development work in Finland over the first few decades, the Home Mission Society of the American Baptist Churches USA contributed financially starting around 1889.

=== Organizing ===
In 1883, the Swedish-speaking congregations around Jakobstad formed a regional association, Vasa svenska distriktsförening, or the Vasa Swedish District Conference. Some Finnish-speaking congregations also joined. In 1889, Baptists were permitted by the newly-enacted Dissenters' Act to register as an independent body alongside the Evangelical Lutheran Church; both Swedish- and Finnish-speaking churches were part of the association. Cooperation between Finnish and Swedish-speaking Baptists continued; eventually, in 1903, the Finnish-speaking Baptist churches founded a separate national conference. Suomen baptistiyhdyskunta, the Finnish Baptist Union, was registered in 1928. The Swedish-speaking churches cooperate through Finlands svenska baptistmission, the Swedish Baptist Mission of Finland. A registered religious organization, the Swedish Baptist Union of Finland (Swedish: Finlands svenska baptistsamfund) was founded in 1980; not all churches belong to the Union, so the two organizations co-exist.

==== Publications ====
In 1892, the Swedish-language journal Finska Månadsposten ('the Finnish Monthly Post', now known as Missionsstandaret, 'The Mission Standard', or MST for Människa, Samtid, Tro, 'Human, Contemporary, Faith'), founded by I. S. Osterman, was first published. In 1896 the Finnish-language counterpart Totuuden Kaiku ('Echo of Truth', now Kodin Ystävä), edited by writer Veikko Palomaa, was founded.

== Theology, structure, statistics ==
Map of the Baptist churches in Finland. The Baptist church is a relatively popular denomination in the Ostrobothnia region from Jakobstad to Vaasa.

It is not only their membership in different language groups that distinguishes the two Baptist unions from one another, but also their respective theological orientations. While the Finnish Baptistikirkko holds more conservative evangelical positions on many issues, the Swedish-speaking Baptistsamfund leans more toward liberal views and practices women's ordination and open communion. The education of ministers takes place in different institutions. While Swedish speakers study at the ecumenical Åbo Akademi University, Finnish speakers attend a Bible institute run with other free churches.

In international mission work, the Finnish Baptistikirkko cooperates with Danish as well as Swedish Baptists and supports missionaries in Africa, Asia and South America. It also participates in various missionary projects in Estonia. The Swedish-speaking Samfund is one of the sponsoring churches of the European Baptist Mission.

Both associations are organized congregationally at the local level and synodally as a national association. They are member churches of the European Baptist Federation and thus also of the Baptist World Alliance. The Seventh Day Baptist congregations also belong to the Baptist World Alliance through their international organization.

The Swedish Baptist Union of Finland (Finlands svenska baptistsamfund) includes 13 congregations with approximately 1000 members. The Finnish Baptist Church (Suomen Baptistikirkko) consists of 14 congregations with approximately 1500 members. The Seventh-day Baptist Fellowship includes two congregations with 35 members. The membership and congregation numbers of the independent Baptist churches are unknown.

== Seventh Day Baptists ==
The history of the Finnish Seventh Day Baptist churches begins in the 1980s. They are associated with Thomas McElwain, an American who taught in the Department of Comparative Religion and Social Policy at the University of Turku. Between 1986 and 1990, he served as volunteer director of the Seventh Day Baptist Mission in Northern Europe. In addition to the congregation founded by McElwain in Turku, there is another in Helsinki. Both congregations are nationally involved in the Baltic Convention association, which they founded with Estonian Seventh Day Baptists.

In Tampere, one of the independent Baptist churches emerged among Russian immigrants. It came from the pioneering work of Tom and Linda Ruhkala, a couple sent by Baptist Mid-Missions. Since 2006, events in English have been offered alongside Russian- and Finnish-language services.

== See also ==
- Betelseminariet – Seminary in Stockholm where Finnish Swedish-speaking Baptists studied
- Religion in Finland
