= Bothnian Sea National Park =

National park in Finland

- IUCN category II (national park)
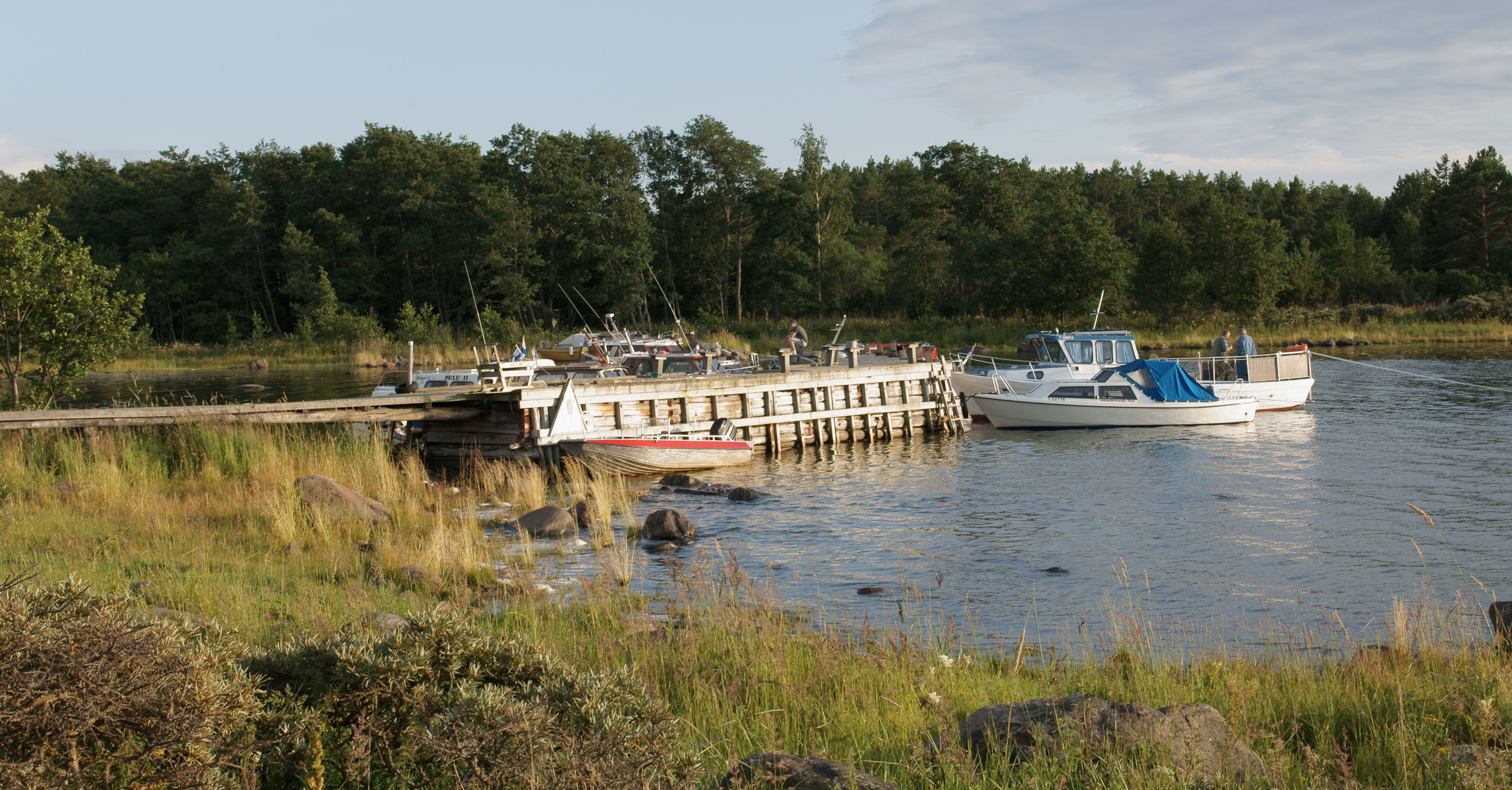

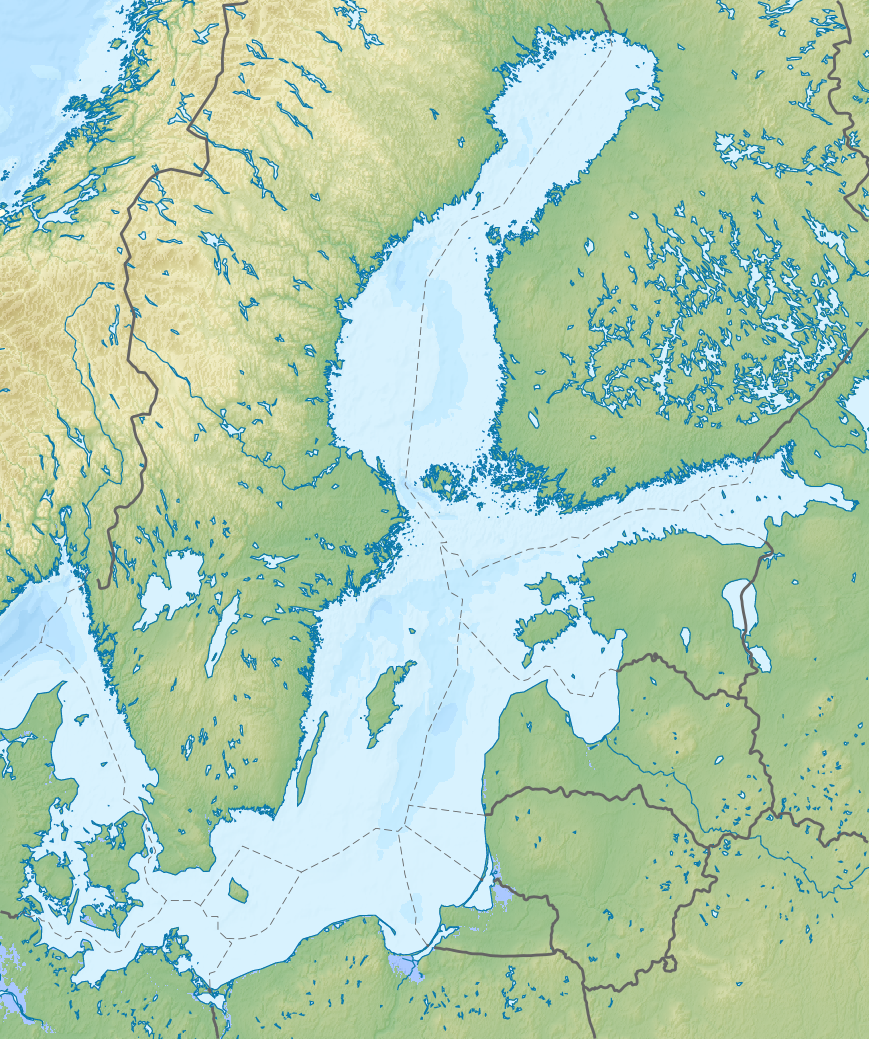
- Location within Baltic Sea Location within Finland
- Location: Southwest Finland & Satakunta, Western Finland Province, Finland
- Coordinates: 61°N 21.1°E
- Established: 2011
- Visitors: 79,400 (in 2024)
- Governing body: Metsähallitus
- Website: https://www.luontoon.fi/en/destinations/bothnian-sea-national-park

Bothnian Sea National Park (Finnish: Selkämeren kansallispuisto, Swedish: Bottenhavets nationalpark) is a national park in Finland. It was established in early 2011. Around 98% of the surface of the National Park consists of water.
