= Finnish Baptist Church =

- Suomen Baptistikirkko
- Classification: Evangelical Christianity
- Theology: Baptist
- Associations: European Baptist Federation; Baptist World Alliance; Finnish Ecumenical Council
- Region: Finland
- Headquarters: Helsinki
- Origin: 1903
- Congregations: 18
- Members: 900
- Official website: baptisti.fi

Finnish Baptist Church (Finnish: Suomen Baptistikirkko) is a Baptist Christian denomination in Finland. It is a member of the Finnish Ecumenical Council, the European Baptist Federation and the Baptist World Alliance. The headquarters is in Helsinki. The Baptist Church of Finland has highest number of congregations in Central Finland. The largest congregations are located in Jyväskylä, Tampere and Turku.

== History ==
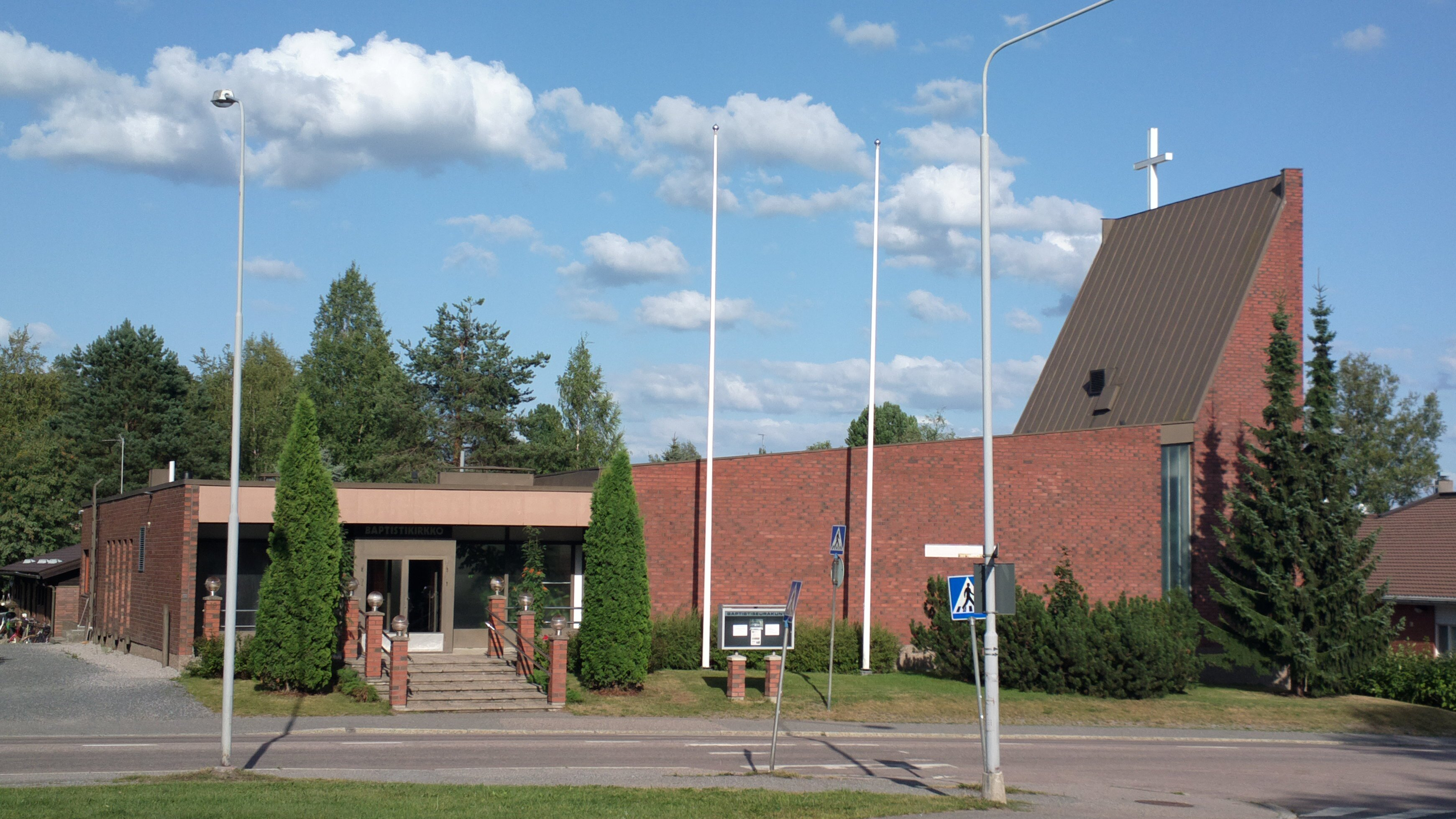
A Baptist Church in Tampere

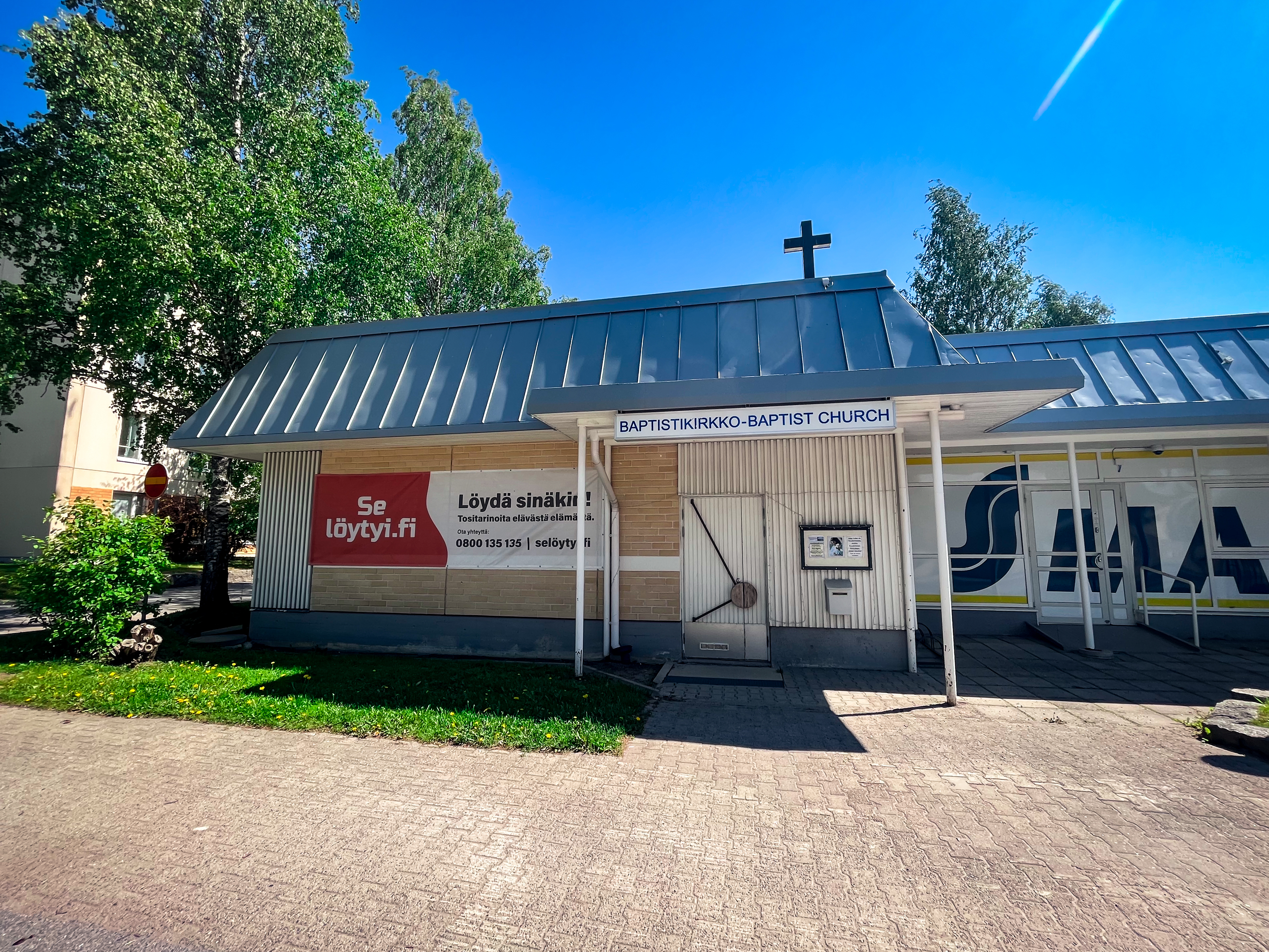
A Finnish-language Baptist Church in Vaasa

The Convention has its origins in a Swedish mission in Föglö, Åland in 1854. The first Finnish Baptist congregation near Pori was founded in 1870 by Henriksson. The Finnish Baptist Union was officially formed in 1903. In 2009, the Finnish Baptist Union changed its name to the Finnish Baptist Church.

According to a census published by the association in 2023, it claimed 18 churches and 900 members.

== Beliefs ==
Many among the Finnish Baptist church have been influenced doctrinally by Lutheranism. Finnish Baptists generally are not Charismatic, though some have moderate continuationist views. They affirm the basic Protestant doctrines of the five solae and general Baptist doctrines such as memorialism and credobaptism.

The Finnish Baptist Church does not ordain women and is theologically conservative.
