= Inhottu =

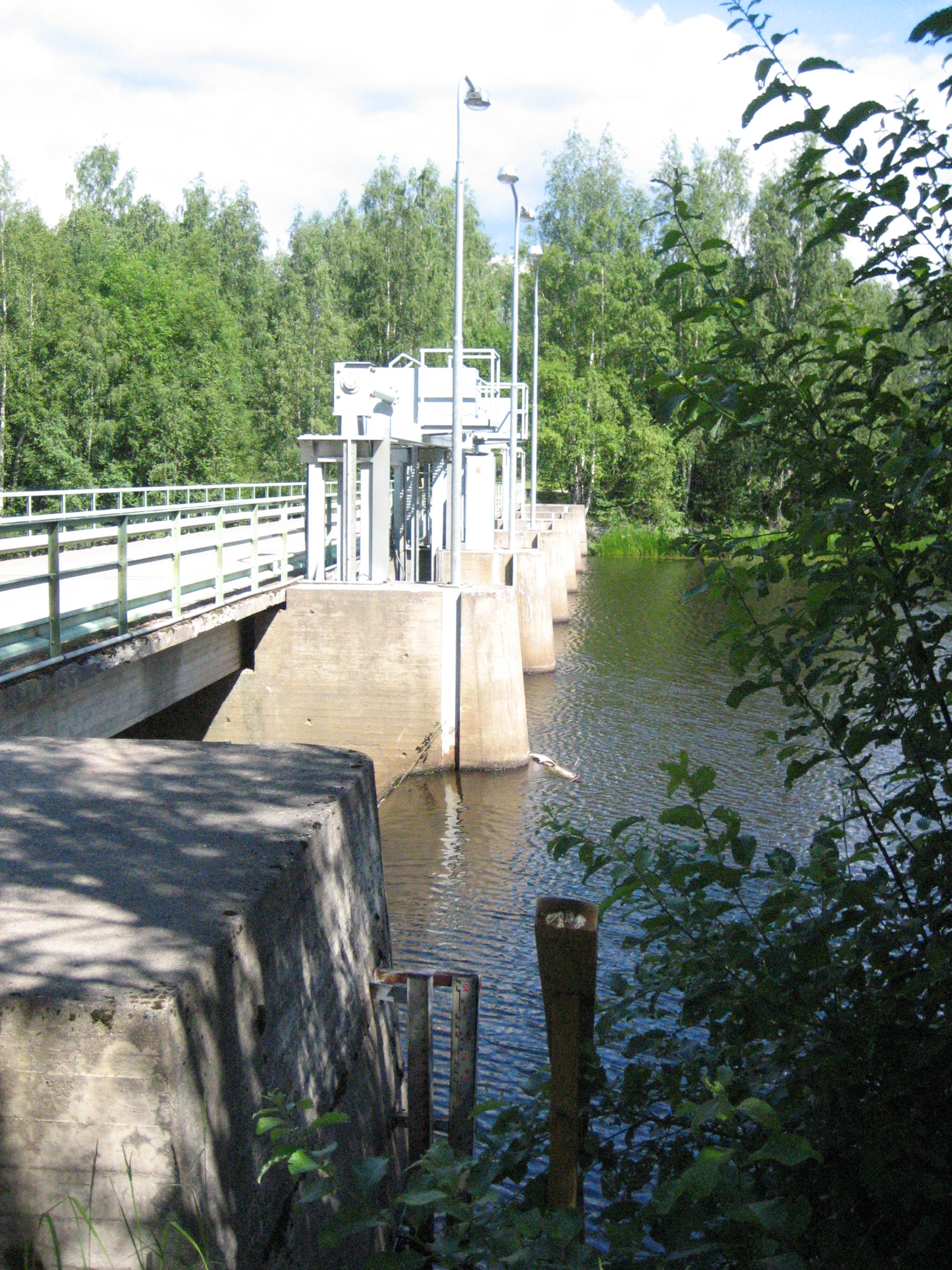

- Location within Finland
- Location: Pori, Pomarkku
- Coordinates: 61°37.2′N 22°08.5′E
- Type: Lake
- Primary outflows: rivers Pomarkunjoki and Eteläjoki
- Catchment area: Karvianjoki
- Basin countries: Finland
- Surface area: 4.49 km^{2} (1.73 sq mi)
- Average depth: 0.8 m (2 ft 7 in)
- Water volume: 0.0039 km^{3} (3,200 acre⋅ft)
- Shore length^{1}: 24.35 km (15.13 mi)
- Surface elevation: 43 m (141 ft)
- Frozen: December–April
- ^{1} Shore length is not a well-defined measure.

Inhottu (Finnish: Inhottujärvi) is a rather small lake in the Karvianjoki main catchment area. It is located in the region of Satakunta in Finland. It is a bifurcation lake because there are two outlets on the lake: the waters flow into the Gulf of Bothnia through the river Eteläjoki in Pori and into lake Isojärvi through the river Pomarkunjoki.

Inhottu is a European Natura 2000 area because of the protection of birds.

== See also ==
- List of lakes in Finland
