= Isojärvi (Satakunta) =

Lake in Pomarkku, Finland

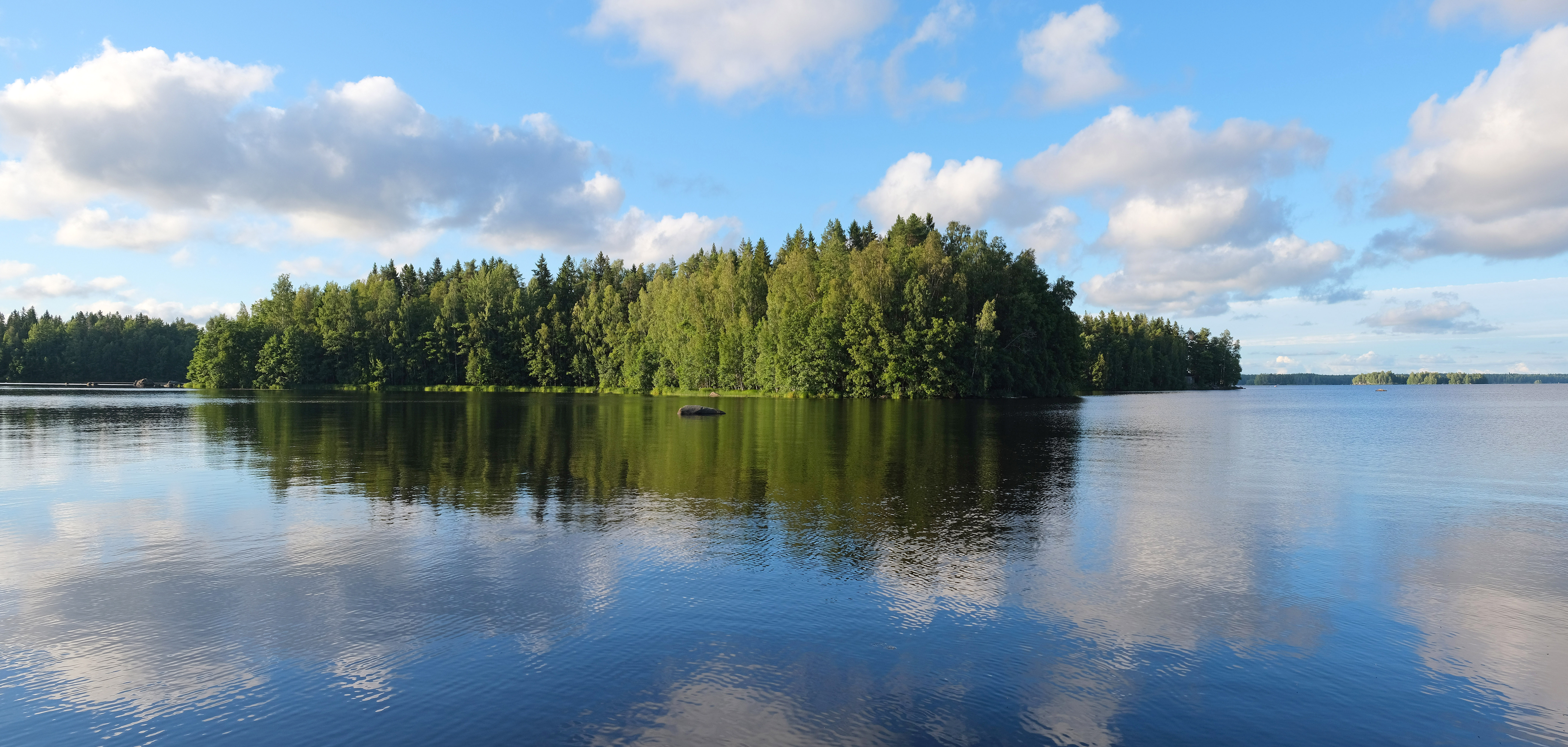

- Location within Finland
- Location: Pomarkku, Siikainen
- Coordinates: 61°44′N 21°48′E
- Primary inflows: Pomarkunjoki
- Primary outflows: Merikarvianjoki, Salmusoja
- Basin countries: Finland
- Surface area: 38.824 km^{2} (14.990 sq mi)
- Average depth: 2.93 m (9 ft 7 in)
- Max. depth: 10.2 m (33 ft)
- Water volume: 0.114 km^{3} (92,000 acre⋅ft)
- Shore length^{1}: 199.39 km (123.90 mi)
- Surface elevation: 34.8 m (114 ft)
- Frozen: December–April
- Islands: Iso Rooholma, Honkaluoto, Kiilholma
- Settlements: Pomarkku, Siikainen
- ^{1} Shore length is not a well-defined measure.

Isojärvi is a medium-sized lake in Finland. It is situated in the region of Satakunta in Western Finland and in the municipalities of Pomarkku in south and Siikainen in north. The lake is a part of the Karvianjoki basin that drains into the Gulf of Bothnia.

Isojärvi is common lake name in Finland. There are 31 lakes with this name. Satakunta's isojärvi is the biggest of them.

The lake is a bifurcation lake: the main part of its waters flow into the Merikarvianjoki River that mouths into the Gulf of Bothnia in Merikarvia but part of the waters flow through the Salmusoja River into lake Poosjärvi that drains through the river Poosjoki – Lampinjoki – Pohjajoki into the Gulf of Bothnia in Ahlainen, Pori.

== See also ==
- List of lakes in Finland
