= Panelia Church =

- Finnish: Panelian kirkko
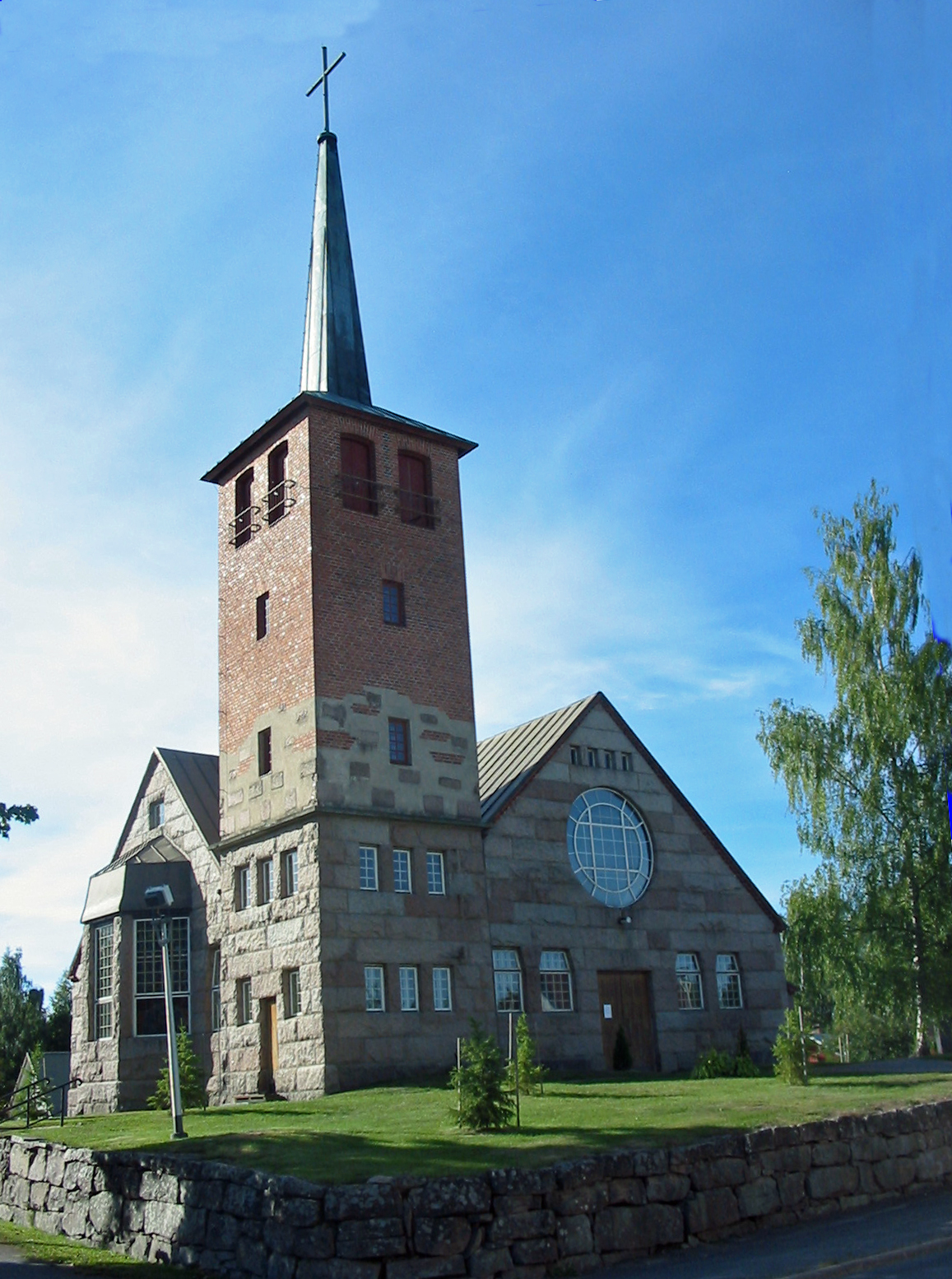
- Panelia Church
- 61°13′31.48″N 21°58′26.98″E
- Location: Panelia, Kiukainen, Eura, Satakunta
- Country: Finland
- Website: www.euranseurakunta.fi/kirkot-ja-tilat/panelian-kirkko-ja-meijeri

History
- Consecrated: 1909 (as chapel); 1950 (as church)

Architecture
- Completed: 1909; 117 years ago

The Panelia Church (Finnish: Panelian kirkko) is the 20th-century granite church located in the village of Panelia in the Eura municipality in Satakunta, Finland. When it was completed in 1909, the building served as a chapel, but it was officially consecrated as a church in 1950.

Unlike most of the churches in Finland, the Panelia Church is not owned by the parish but by the chapel association. Despite this, it still works in close cooperation with the parish.

The church's current pipe organ is from 1974.
