= Panelia =

- Village
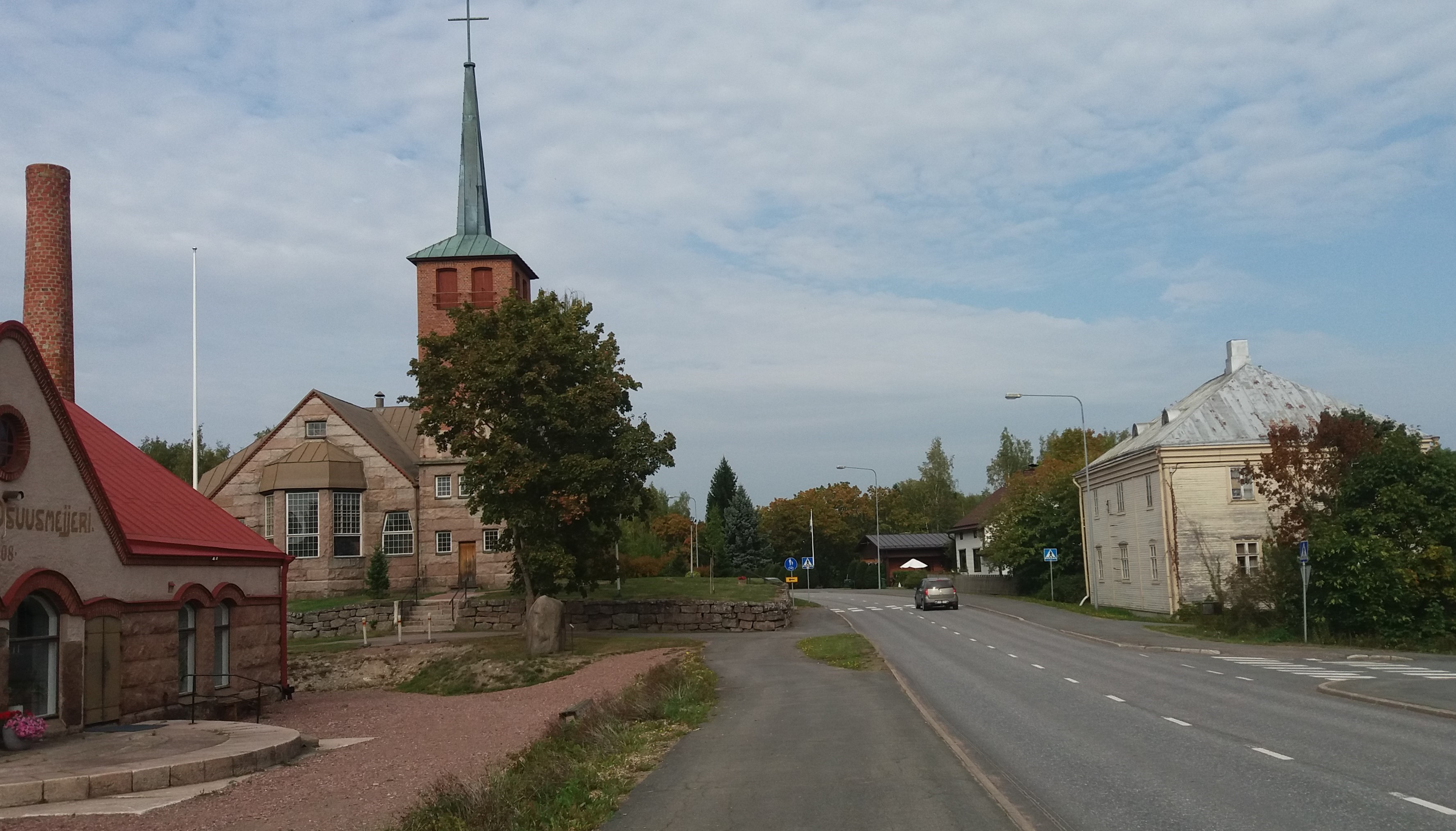
- The main street (route 2172) of Panelia; on the left the Panelia Church and the Panelia Dairy.
- Interactive map of Panelia
- Coordinates: 61°13.4757′N 21°58.4750′E
- Country: Finland
- Region: Satakunta
- Sub-region: Rauma sub-region
- Municipality: Eura

Population (12-31-2020)
  - Total: 850

Panelia is a village in the municipality of Eura in Satakunta, Finland. It is located on the connecting road 2172, about 15 kilometres (9.3 mi) away from the town centers of Eura and Harjavalta. Panelia has a population of 850 inhabitants, and, along with the Eurakoski village, it was the second urban area in the former municipality of Kiukainen, which joined Eura in 2009.

== History ==
Panelia is an old village, established in the 13th century at the latest. The origin of the name is unclear, but Aarne Rauvola suggests that it refers to panni, an old unit of measurement used for grain. Panelia, like the rest of Kiukainen, was originally a part of the Eura parish. The first chapel in the area was built in the early 1690s. The chapel burnt down in 1714, after which a church was built in the village of Kiukainen (now Eurakoski). Due to this, Kiukainen/Eurakoski supplanted Panelia as the main village of the area.

== Services ==
Panelia's services include a primary school, a library, a health center and a fire station. In addition, the village has a pharmacy, K-Market grocery store, café and pizzeria. The village previously has the Osuuspankki bank office, but it was closed in 2017. Panelia also has an ice hall, which was completed in 1999, and a disc golf course. Formerly Panelia housed a railway station along the Kokemäki–Rauma railway. It was opened in 1897 and was closed in 1997. Panelia's well-known attractions include the church, dairy, and the Paneliankoski's hydro power plant along the Eura River.

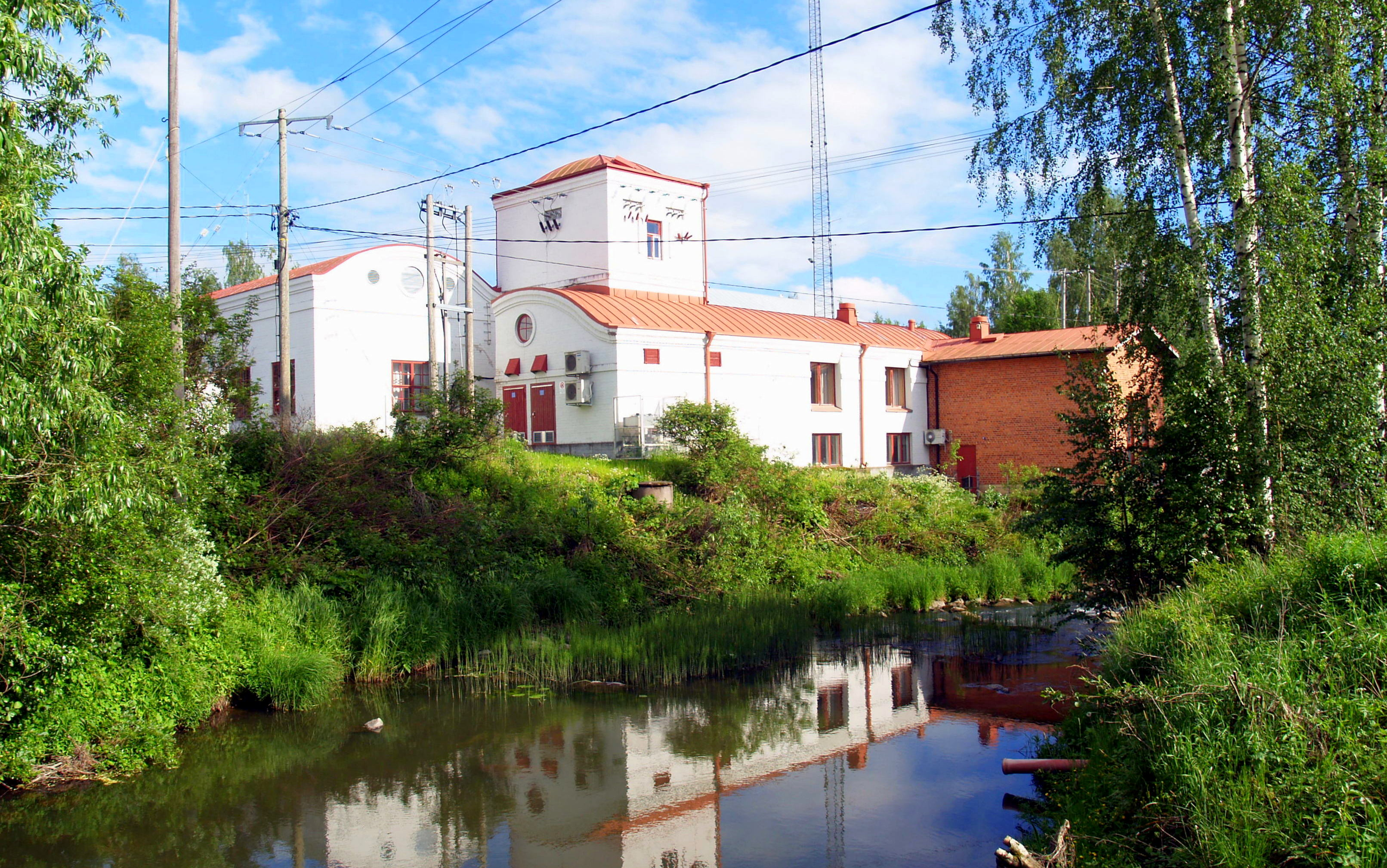
Paneliakoski power plant

== Culture and sights ==
The most famous attraction in Panelia is Kuninkaanhauta ("The King's Grave"), a Bronze Age tumulus dating back to c. 1500–1300 BC, which is the largest burial cairn (Finnish: hiidenkiuas) in Finland. A memorial to those who died in Karelia during World War II was unveiled at the Panelia Cemetery in 1958. In addition, at Maijalankallio, located north of the village, has a memorial stone to the site of the mass execution of the Red Guards during the 1918 Civil War.

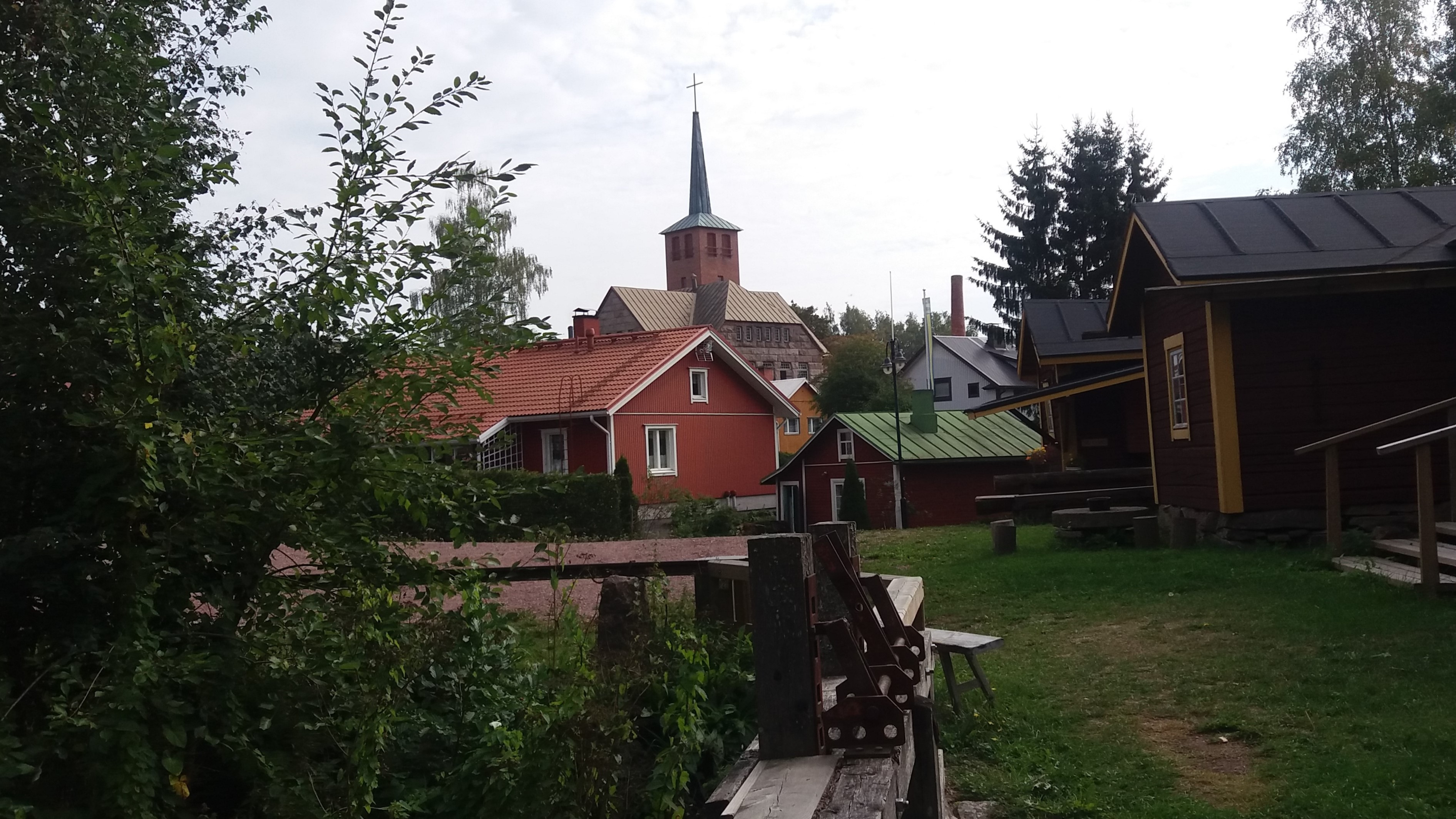
A view from the old mill in Panelia

The village of Panelia is one of the nationally significant built cultural environments inventoried by the Finnish Heritage Agency. Panelia has been chosen as the Satakunta's the "village of the year" in 2006 and 2017. In 2017, Panelia was ranked second in the "most beautiful village" poll of Maalla magazine in honor of the 100th anniversary of Finland.

== See also ==
- Kiukainen
