= Kuninkaanhauta =

Bronze Age tumulus in Panelia, Eura, Finland

Coordinates: 61°13′09.5″N 021°58′45.2″E

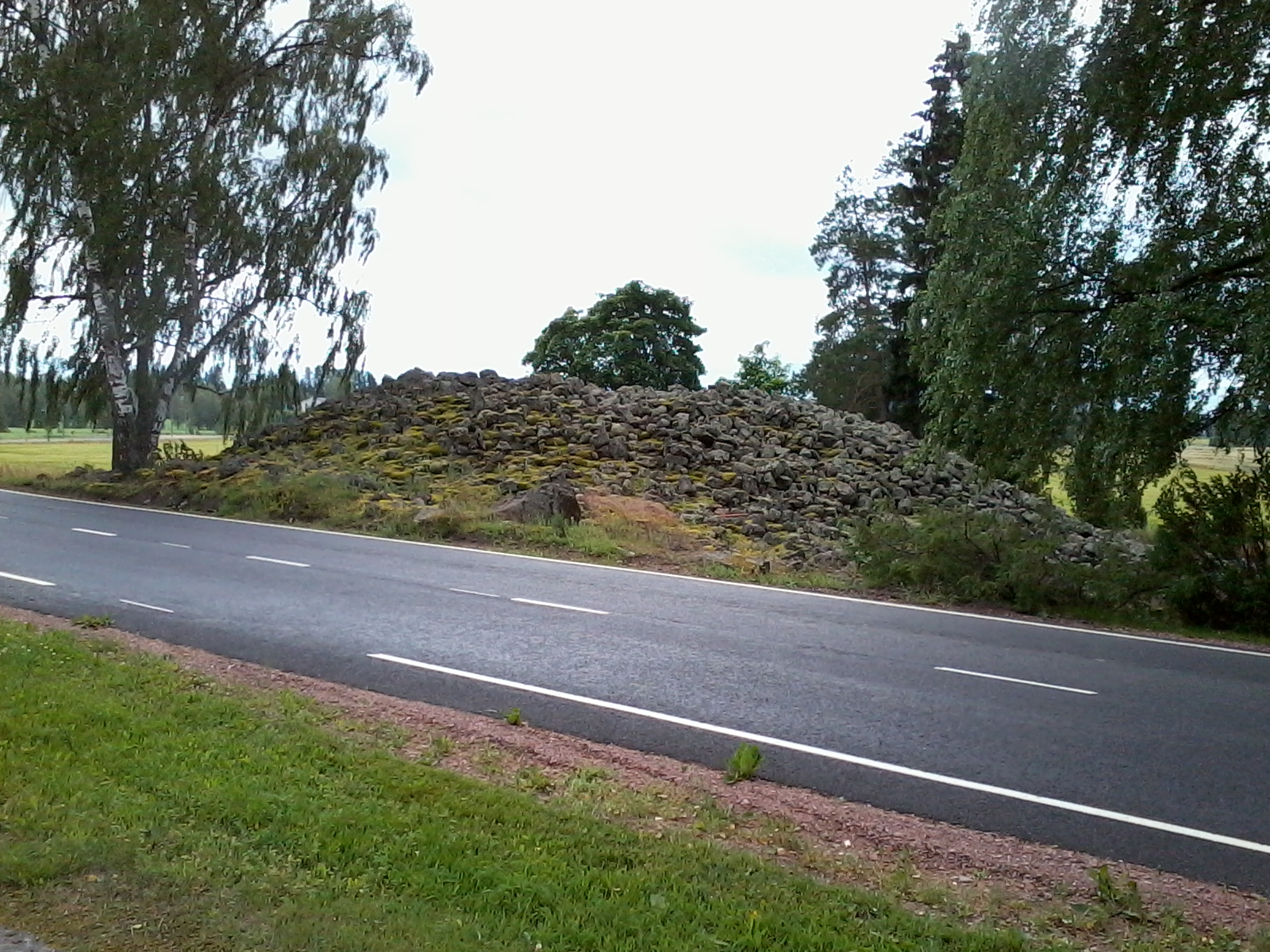
Kuninkaanhauta

Kuninkaanhauta (The King's Grave) is a Bronze Age tumulus in the village of Panelia in Eura, Finland, dating back to c. 1500–1300 BC. It is the largest burial cairn (Finnish: hiidenkiuas) in Finland, Kuninkaanhauta is 36×30 meters wide and about four meters high.

According to the legends, Kuninkaanhauta is the burial place of a local king or chief, but the grave has never been opened. It was built on the shore of the ancient Bay of Panelia. Since the Bronze Age, the coastline has moved nearly 20 kilometers west due to the post-glacial rebound.

Kuninkaanhauta is located about 9 kilometers northeast of the UNESCO World Heritage Site of Sammallahdenmäki which includes more than 30 Bronze Age burial cairns.
