= Sammallahdenmäki =

Historic Bronze Age burial site in Satakunta, Finland

Bronze Age Burial Site of Sammallahdenmäki
UNESCO World Heritage Site
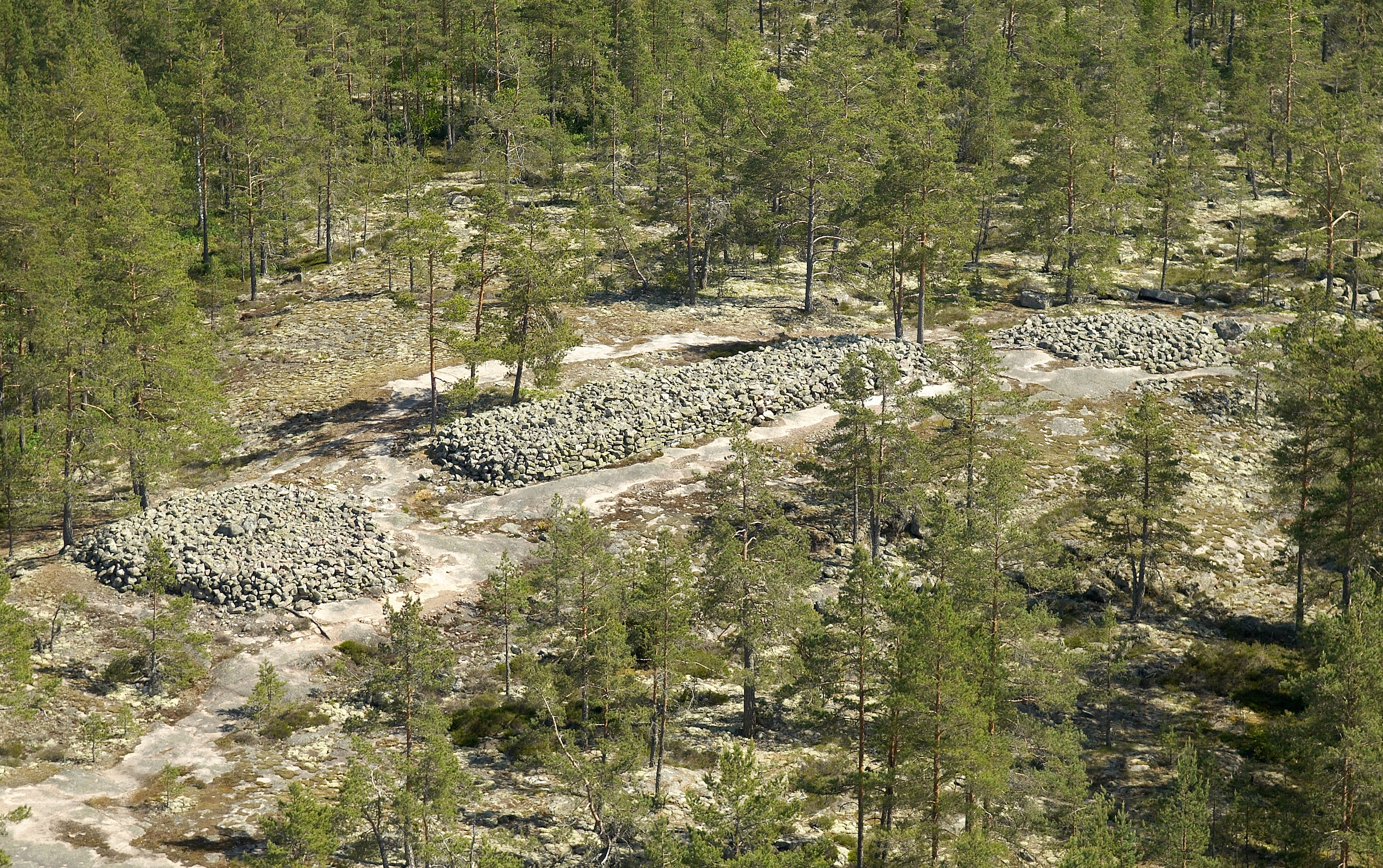
- Long ruin of Huilu

- Location within Finland
- Location: Rauma, Satakunta, Finland
- Criteria: Cultural: (iii), (iv)
- Reference: 579rev
- Inscription: 1999 (23rd Session)
- Coordinates: 61°07′14″N 21°46′39″E

Sammallahdenmäki is a Bronze Age burial site in Finland in Rauma, in the region of Satakunta. The site includes 33 granite burial cairns dating back more than 3,000 years, to 1500 to 500 BC. Sammallahdenmäki is one of the largest, most complete, and most important Bronze Age sites in Fennoscandia, and was designated by UNESCO as a World Heritage Site in 1999.

== Description ==
The burial site is located on a long ridge in a remote area off the road to Tampere from Rauma. The 33 burial cairns making up the site are arranged into distinct clusters along the crest of the ridge. Each cairn was constructed from granite boulders quarried from the cliff face below the ridge or collected on site, in typical Bronze Age fashion. Of the 33 cairns, 28 are dated to the early Bronze Age, and the rest to the early Iron Age. Several different shapes and sizes of these cairns exist at the site. Two unusual cairns are the Huilun pitkä raunio ("long ruin of Huilu"), which is surrounded by an ancient stone wall, and the Kirkonlaattia ("Church Floor"), an unusual rectangular cairn covering 16 x 19 metres with a flat top. The "Church Floor" cairn is the only one of its type found in Scandinavia.

The Sammallahdenmäki cairns were originally built to have a scenic view of the coast and the Gulf of Bothnia (a hallmark of early Bronze Age burial mounds), but over time, uplift has occurred and the ocean is no longer visible. The cairns may relate to rituals of sun worship, a religion that spread across Scandinavia during the Bronze Age, and demonstrates kin group land ownership, which is associated with the advent of farming.

== Discovery and excavation ==
The stone cairns were first mentioned in a catalogue of ancient sites in 1878, along with a vague description of an excavation (of which no details survive). Four of the cairns were excavated by archaeologist Volter Högman in 1891, including Huilun pitkä raunio and Kirkonlaattia. Of the 8 cairns that have been excavated, 6 of them date to the Bronze Age and 2 to the early Iron Age.

== See also ==
- Kuninkaanhauta
