= Peltoauto =

Peltoauto (Note: Peltoauto is roughly translated as "field car" or "crops car".) is a very inexpensive, unregistered and uninspected car especially for minors, or those without a driving permit, to drive in private areas, especially in crop fields.

Peltoautoilu (Note: Peltoautoilu is roughly translated as "field driving" or "field cruising".) is a traditional activity in rural areas. It may be difficult for city-dwellers to grasp the concept. In rural areas, cruising with peltoauto is self-evident.

== Driving before peltoauto ==
In Finland, there is also another type of car, called lokariauto, which is a specially made roofless minicar, designed especially for very young children.

A famous Finnish rally driver Jari-Matti Latvala was only 4 years old when he got his first lokariauto.

== Permissions ==
Minors drive either on their own land, or ask permission from other crop field owners to use their land for cruising.

== Impact on professional motorsports ==
According to Mikko Korpela, who has been organizing race event called Peltorance, in the municipality of Siikainen since 2008, thinks that Finland's success in both rallying and formula racing has been paved by peltoautoilu. He has also stated that, popularity of peltoautoilu is currently growing rapidly.

== See also ==
- Folk racing
- Off-roading
- Rally of the Thousand Lakes
