= Lake bifurcation =

Lake that flows into two drainage basins

A lake bifurcation occurs when a lake (a bifurcating lake) has outflows into two different drainage basins. In this case, the immediate drainage basin of the lake may be included as part of both its distributaries, and the drainage divide between those two basins cannot be defined in the area.

== List ==
=== Crossing continental divides ===
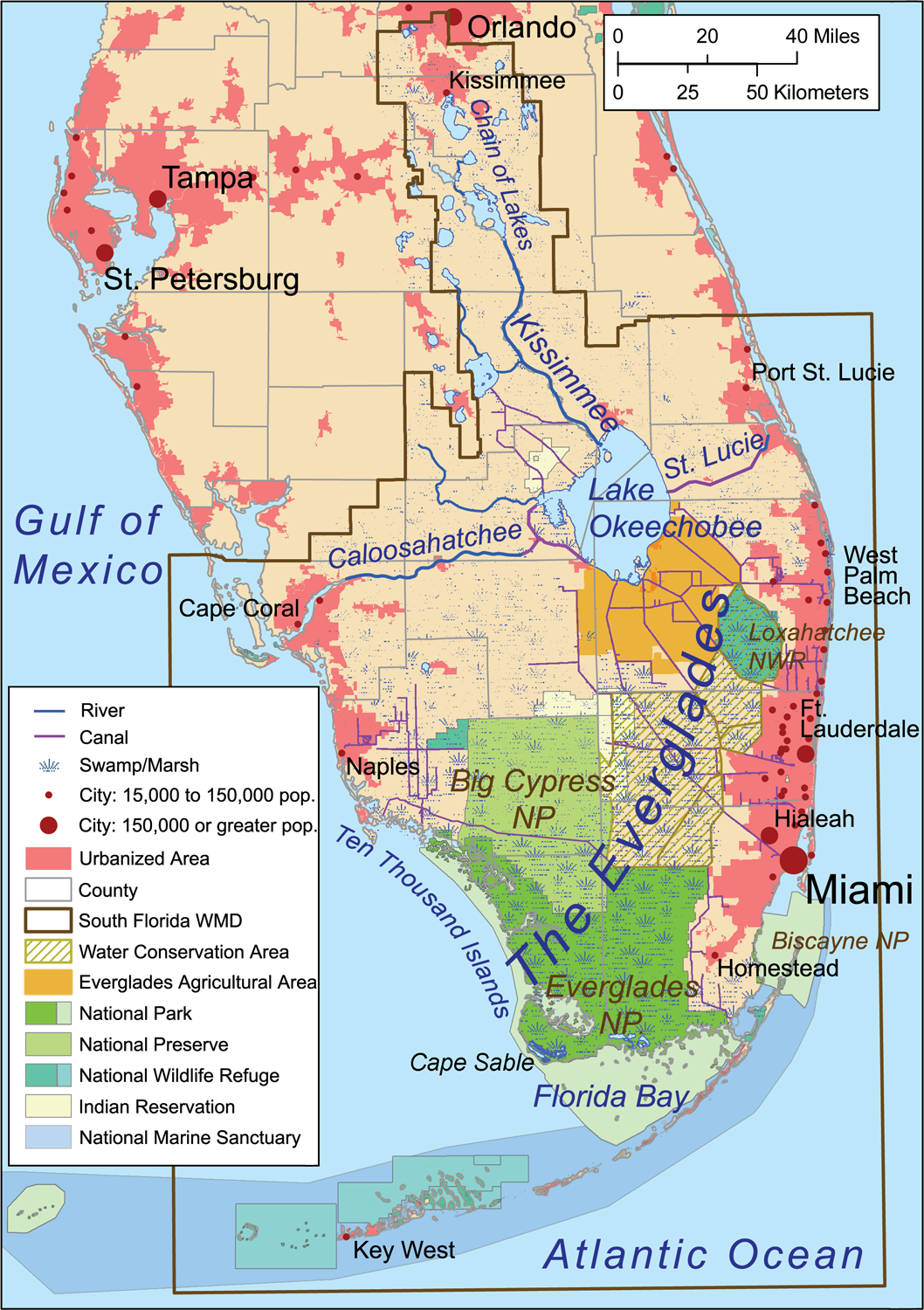
A map of the Lake Okeechobee watershed showcasing the lake's multiple outlets.

Great Divide of the Americas

- Committee's Punch Bowl, a small lake at the summit of Athabasca Pass in the Canadian Rockies
- Isa Lake in Yellowstone National Park is a natural bifurcated lake which drains into two oceans. Its western drainage is to the Gulf of Mexico (part of the Atlantic Ocean) via the Firehole River, while its eastern drainage is to the Pacific Ocean via the Lewis River.
- The artificial Gatun Lake in Panama

Other continental divides

- Lakes Superior, Huron, and Michigan naturally drain to the St. Clair River and ultimately into the Gulf of St. Lawrence. However, the artificial reversal of the Chicago River and Calumet River allow water from these lakes to crossing the St. Lawrence River Divide and reach the Mississippi River system and ultimately the Gulf of Mexico.
- Lake Okeechobee in Florida has both natural and artificial outlets east to the Atlantic Ocean, west to the Gulf of Mexico, and south through the Everglades. The Eastern Continental Divide terminates at the Lake Okeechobee watershed.
- Wollaston Lake in Canada is the world's largest bifurcation lake, draining both northwest to the Arctic Ocean and northeast to Hudson Bay, on opposite sides of the Arctic Divide

=== Crossing other drainage divides ===
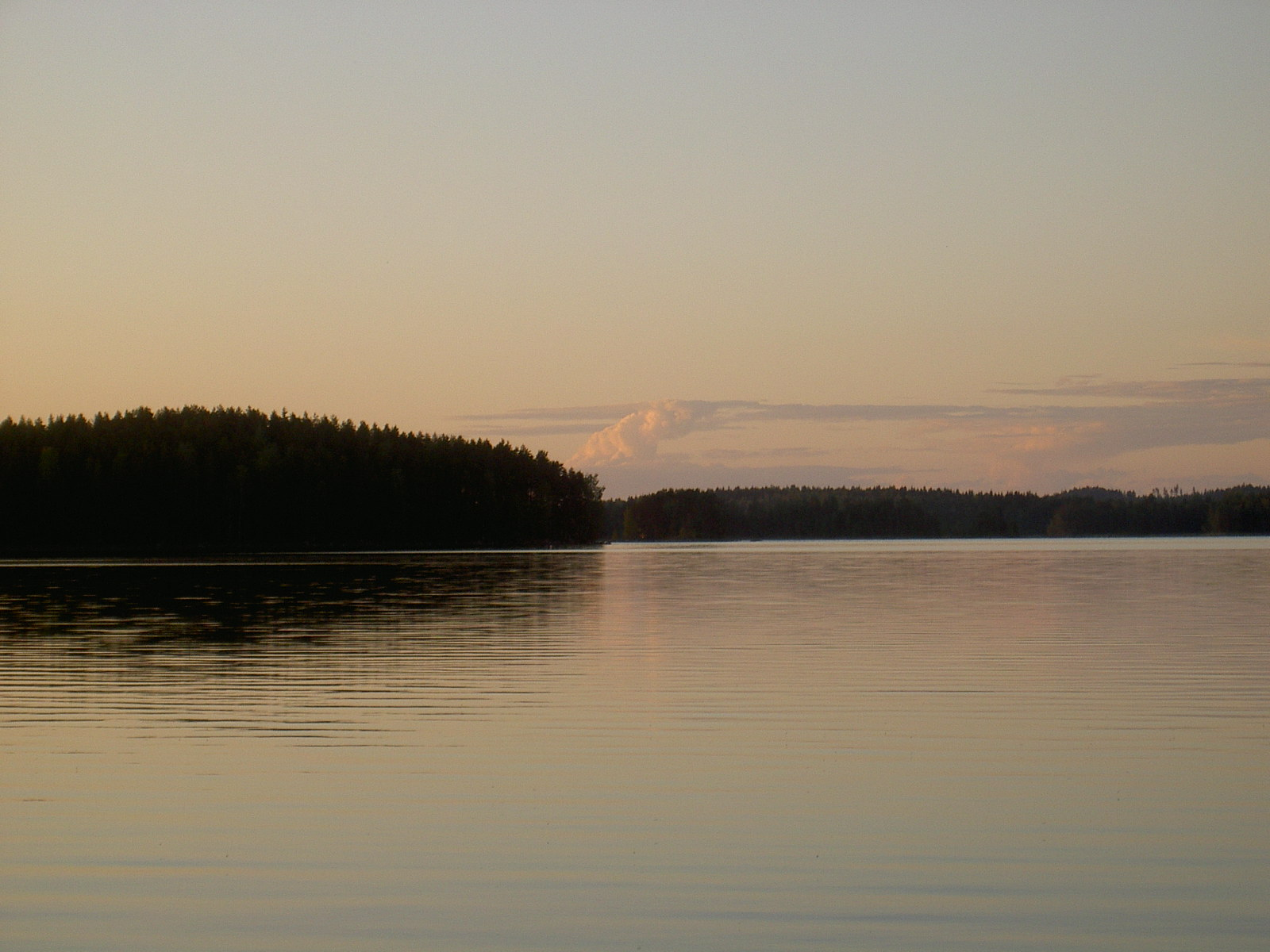
Lake Vesijako in Padasjoki, Finland

North America

- Bontecou Lake, a shallow, man-made bifurcation lake in Dutchess County, New York that outflows into two watersheds, those of the Hudson and Housatonic rivers
- Peeler Lake in California's Hoover Wilderness is a natural bifurcated lake that lies along the Great Basin Divide. It has two outlets, one of which drains east into the Great Basin, and one of which drains west to the Pacific Ocean.
- Lake Diefenbaker in Saskatchewan is a reservoir created by damming South Saskatchewan River and Qu'Appelle River. The lake continues to drain into the two rivers, but the Qu'Appelle receives a much enlarged flow (in essence, a diversion of flow from the South Saskatchewan) from the damming. Both rivers eventually drain into Hudson Bay via Lake Winnipeg and the Nelson River. Also located in Saskatchewan is Wollaston Lake, which is the source of Fond du Lac River draining into the Arctic Ocean and of Cochrane River draining into Hudson Bay and the Atlantic Ocean.
- Lac Sainte-Anne located at N50.14222° W67.86399° north of Baie Comeau Quebec is shown on Canadian government topographical maps as draining into Rivière Toulnustouc and also into Rivière Godbout Est

Europe

- Lesjaskogsvatnet in Norway is the source of the rivers Gudbrandsdalslågen and Rauma, which eventually flow into the Skagerrak and the Norwegian Sea, respectively.
- Inhottu, Isojärvi, Kivesjärvi, Kuolimo, Lummene, Vehkajärvi and Vesijako in Finland
  - Vesijako (the name Vesijako actually means "drainage divide") and Lummene in the Finnish Lakeland are two nearby lakes in Finland. Both drain in two directions: into the Kymijoki basin that drains into the Gulf of Finland and into the Kokemäenjoki basin that drains into the Gulf of Bothnia.
  - Similarly the lakes Isojärvi and Inhottu in the Karvianjoki basin in the Satakunta region of western Finland both have two outlets: from Inhottu the waters flow into the Gulf of Bothnia through the Eteläjoki River in Pori and into lake Isojärvi through the Pomarkunjoki River. From lake Isojärvi the waters flow to the Gulf of Bothnia through the Pohjajoki river in Pori and through the Merikarvianjoki river in Merikarvia. In the Karvianjoki basin there have formerly been two other bifurcations, both eradicated by human actions.

Asia and Oceania

- Heavenly Lake on the North Korea–People's Republic of China border
- Lake Pedder in Tasmania, as a result of damming, drains east as the Huon River and west as the Serpentine, a tributary of the Gordon.
- Lake Manapouri in New Zealand has been modified as part of a hydroelectric scheme such that it drains (naturally) south to Foveaux Strait via the Waiau River and (artificially) west via a constructed tunnel to Doubtful Sound

== See also ==
- River bifurcation
