= Eurajoki (river) =

Coordinates: 61.221122°N 22.053058°E

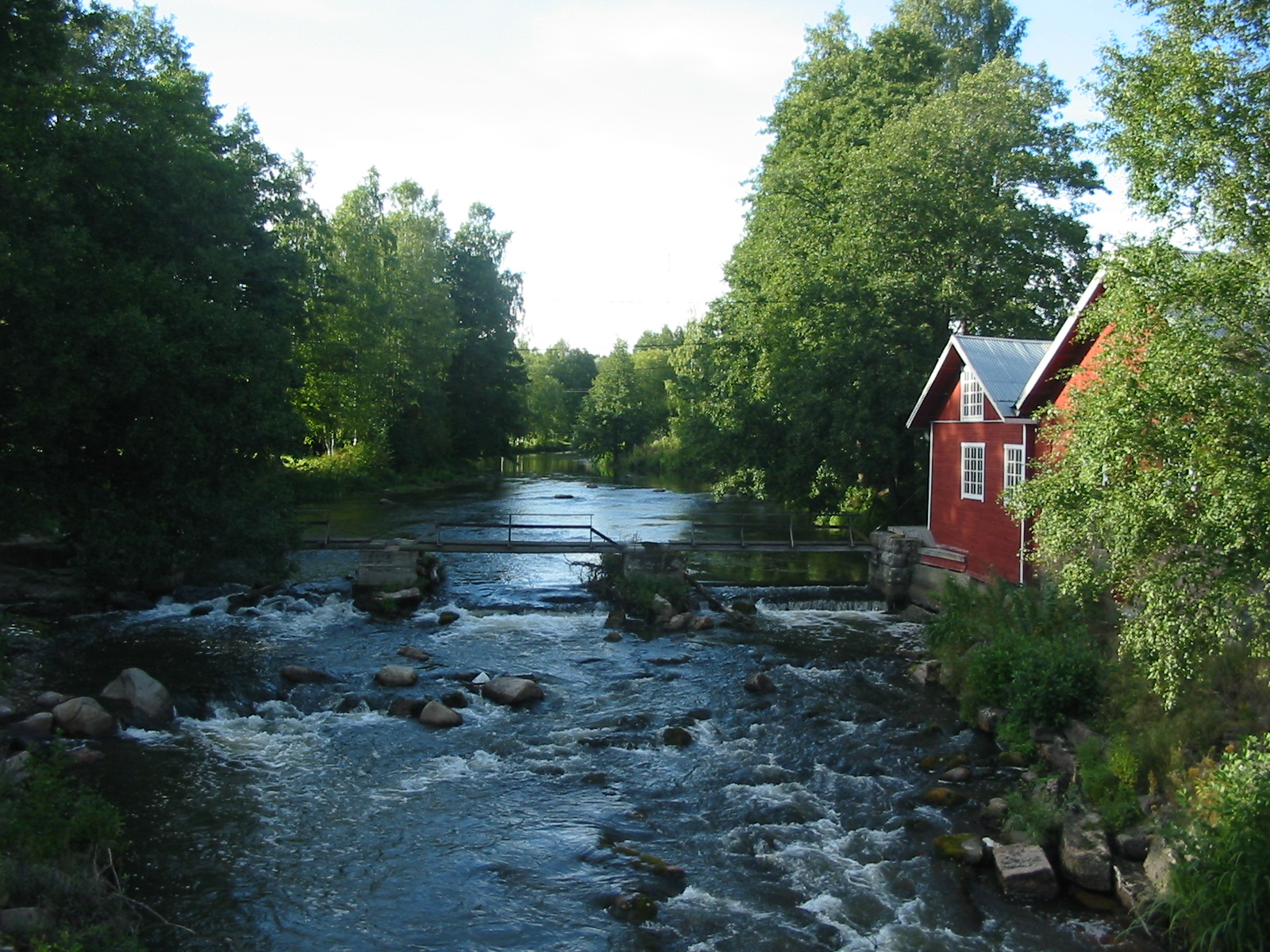
- Faltunkoski rapids

Location
- Country: Finland

Physical characteristics
- Source
  - location: Lake Pyhäjärvi, Eura
  - elevation: 44.9 m (147 ft)
- Mouth
  - location: Bothnian Sea, Eurajoki
- Length: 53 km (33 mi)
- Basin size: 1,336 km^{2} (516 sq mi)
- Discharge
  - average: 9 m^{3}/s (320 cu ft/s)

Eurajoki (Swedish: Eura å) is a river in south-western Finland in Satakunta region. Its source is Lake Pyhäjärvi and it flows through the municipalities of Eura and Eurajoki before discharging into Bothnian Sea.

The total length of Eurajoki is 53 kilometres (33 mi). It has eleven rapids and three small hydroelectric power plants with an installed capacity of 0.1–0.5 MW. Its longest tributary is the 23-kilometre-long Köyliö which originates at Lake Köyliö.

Eurajoki has been an important waterway since the Viking Age, connecting the fertile hinterland to the Baltic Sea. Bronze and Iron Age settlements in Eura were the most largest and most remarkable in Finland.
