= Oskari Vihantola =

Finnish politician (1876–1936)

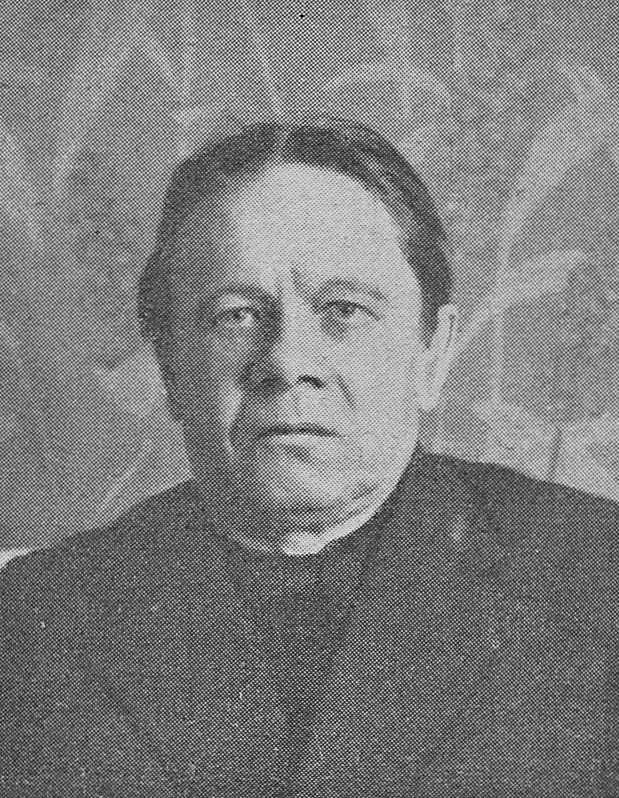
Image of Oskari Vihantola

Frans Oskar (Oskari) Vihantola (25 January 1876, in Pomarkku – 25 August 1936; surname until 1906 Grönroos) was a Finnish bookseller, newspaper editor, lay preacher and politician. From 1 June to 14 September 1909, he was a member of the Parliament of Finland, representing the Christian Workers' Union of Finland (SKrTL).
