= Harjavalta =

- Town
- Harjavallan kaupunki Harjavalta stad
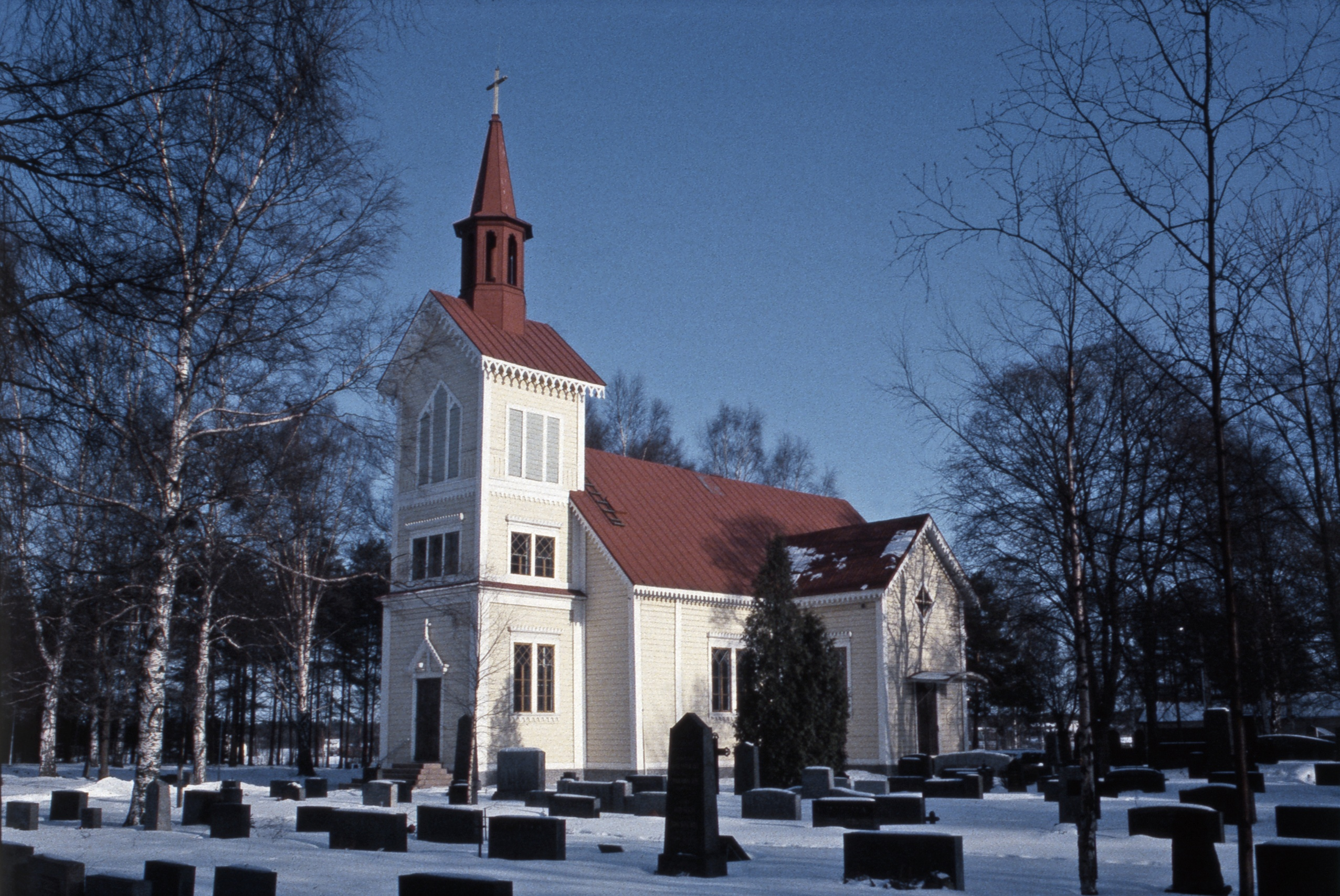
- Harjavalta Church

- Coat of arms

- Location of Harjavalta in Finland
- Interactive map of Harjavalta
- Coordinates: 61°19′0″N 22°08′1″E
- Country: Finland
- Region: Satakunta
- Sub-region: Pori
- Charter: 1869
- Market town: 1968
- Town privileges: 1977

Government
  - Town manager: Hannu Kuusela

Area (2018-01-01)
  - Total: 127.74 km^{2} (49.32 sq mi)
  - Land: 123.48 km^{2} (47.68 sq mi)
  - Water: 4.28 km^{2} (1.65 sq mi)
  - Rank: 288th largest in Finland
- Elevation: 38 m (125 ft)

Population (2025-12-31)
  - Total: 6,565
  - Rank: 139th largest in Finland
  - Density: 53.17/km^{2} (137.7/sq mi)

Population by native language
  - Finnish: 94.3% (official)
  - Swedish: 0.2%
  - Others: 5.5%

Population by age
  - 0 to 14: 13.6%
  - 15 to 64: 54.2%
  - 65 or older: 32.2%
- Time zone: UTC+02:00 (EET)
  - Summer (DST): UTC+03:00 (EEST)
- Climate: Dfc
- Website: www.harjavalta.fi

Harjavalta (Finnish pronunciation: [ˈhɑrjɑˌʋɑltɑ]) is a town and municipality in Finland. It's located in the Satakunta region, 29 kilometres (18 mi) southeast of Pori. The town has a population of 6,565 (31 December 2025) and covers an area of 127.74 square kilometres (49.32 sq mi) of which 4.28 km^{2} (1.65 sq mi) is water. The population density is 53.17 inhabitants per square kilometre (137.7/sq mi).

Harjavalta is a centre for copper and nickel smelting industries. Today's most used metal recovery method, the flash smelting method, was developed at Harjavalta and implemented in 1949. Originally part of Outokumpu, a Finnish company, the local copper business is now owned by Boliden and the nickel business by Norilsk Nickel.

Hiittenharju is a ridge in Harjavalta, known for its archaeology and cultural history. The banks of the ancient Litorina Sea lies on the fringes of the Hiittenharju ridge. In the Hiittenharju area Bronze Age graves, called barrows, have been discovered, and there is also a historical route called Huovintie running through Hiittenharju. The river Kokemäenjoki river runs through the town.

The neighboring municipalities are Eura, Kokemäki, Nakkila and Ulvila. The municipality is unilingually Finnish.

== History ==
Earliest signs of habitation on the area have been dated to 1200 BC. Various different writings of the name in documents of the 15th century at the Turku Cathedral are Harianwalta, Hariawalta, Hariaualdastha, Harianwaltha and Harianwaltaby. The name is supposed to originate from the speculative Proto Germanic name *Harjawaldaz, composed of the speculative words *harjaz ("army") and *waldaz ("authority"). It is believed that either a person named Harjawaldaz or a warrior band settled or lived in the area. The earliest known written occurrence of the name is from Tacitus on the first century, Chariovalda. Different adoptions of the same name are Harald, Hérault and Harold, but Harjavalta is closest to the reconstructed original.

In 1670, the villages of Harjavalta formed their own chapel parish, but the official status of an independent congregation began to be sought about 200 years later. Harjavalta's application for its own pastor was granted in 1868, and the decision was implemented in 1878. The new independent parish had about 1,600 members. The great famine years in the 1860s doubled mortality in Finland, but on the scale of Finland as a whole, Harjavalta did little to avoid this ordeal. The act of 1865 on the municipal government led to the formation of the municipal council and the municipal government also in Harjavalta in 1869. This is considered to be the year of birth of the municipality of Harjavalta. The first store in Harjavalta was founded in a church village in 1874. A second store soon opened in the village of Merstola. The most important sales products were salt, coffee and sugar, but the selections also included fabrics, wheat flour, licorice and tobacco. The first school building was acquired in 1885, when the municipality bought the Kreetala farm, the main building of which became Harjavalta's first folk school.

== Transport ==
The state-owned rail company VR operates a service between Tampere and Pori, stopping at Harjavalta. Harjavalta is served by OnniBus.com route Helsinki—Pori.
