= Pyhäjärvi (Satakunta) =

Lake in Finland

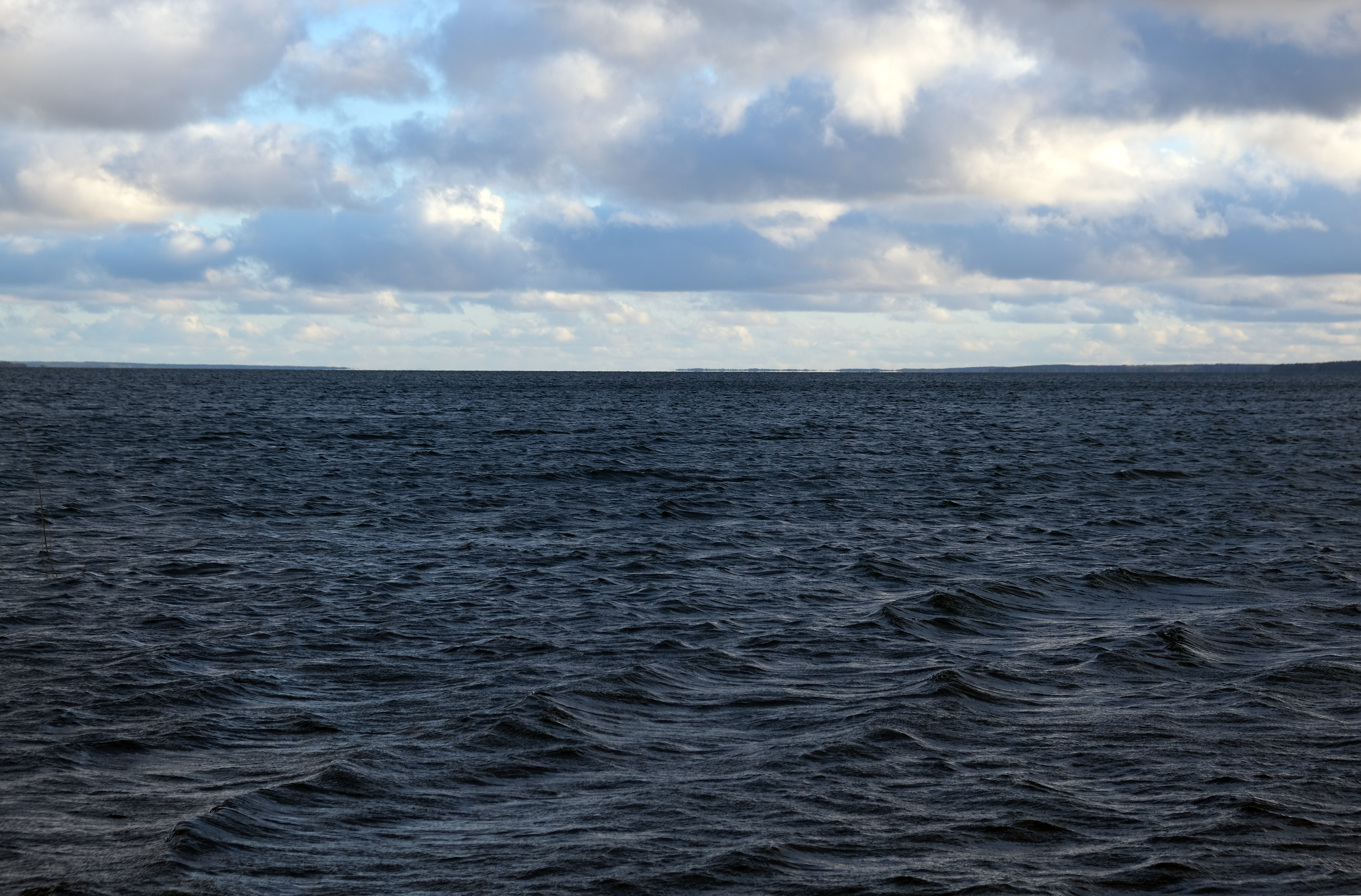
- Lake Pyhäjärvi seen from Kauttua

- Location within Finland
- Location: Satakunta, Southwest Finland
- Coordinates: 61°00′N 22°18′E
- Primary inflows: Yläneenjoki
- Primary outflows: Eurajoki
- Basin countries: Finland
- Max. length: 30 km (19 mi)
- Max. width: 8 km (5.0 mi)
- Surface area: 155.19 km^{2} (59.92 sq mi)
- Average depth: 5.4 m (18 ft)
- Max. depth: 26 m (85 ft)
- Water volume: 0.84 km^{3} (680,000 acre⋅ft)
- Surface elevation: 44.9 m (147 ft)
- Settlements: Eura, Säkylä, Pöytyä

Pyhäjärvi is a lake in Finland. It is the largest lake in the southwestern Finland and is notable for having relatively few islands. Although the lake is eutrophicated, it is considered a good fishing lake.
