= Biolan =

Finnish agriculture company

- Type: Joint-stock company
- Industry: Gardening and farming products, waste water treatment
- Founded: 1974
- Headquarters: Eura, Finland
- Website: Official website

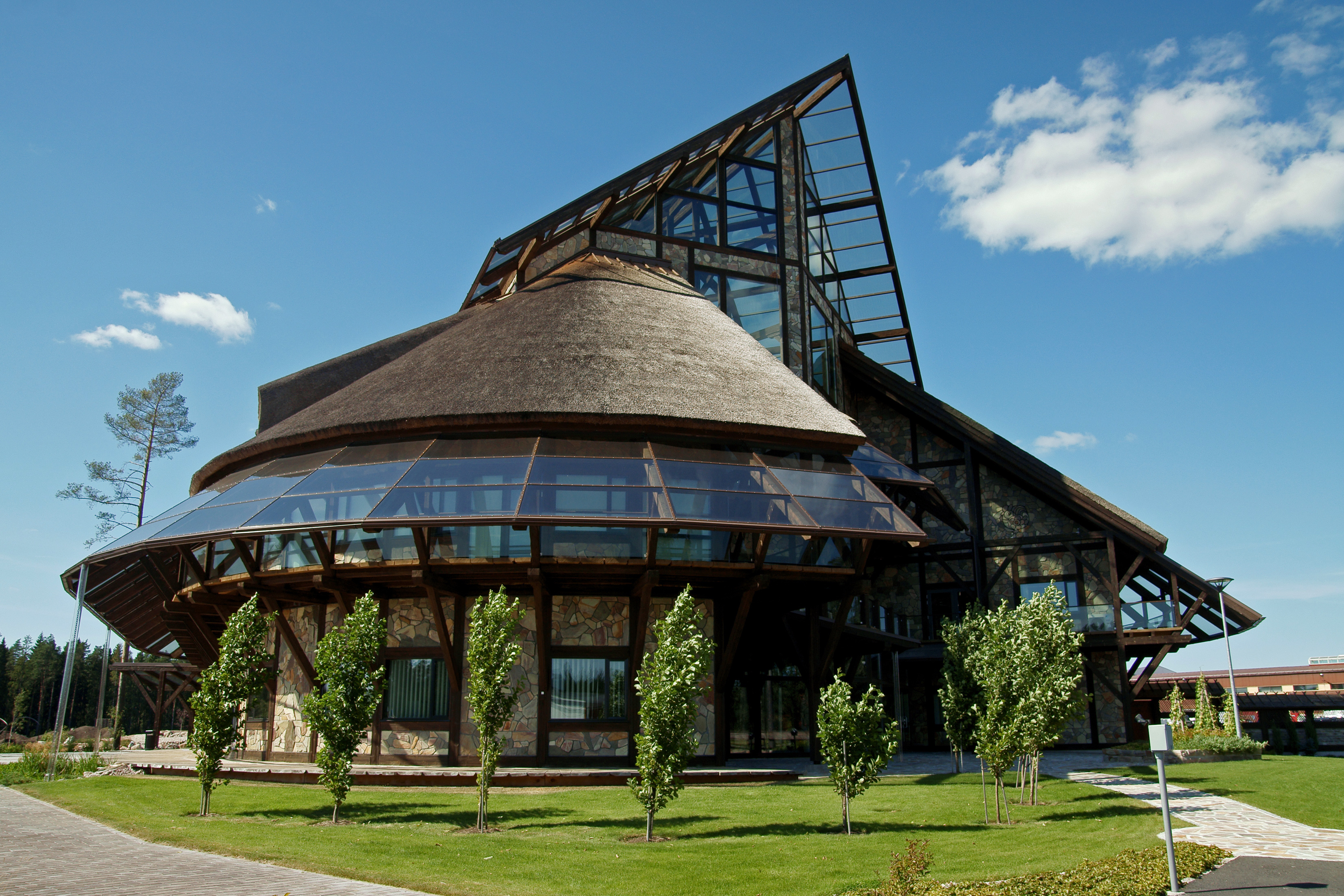
Biolan headquarters in Eura

Biolan is a Finnish company producing substrates for growing house and garden plants, fertilizers, composters, waste water treatment systems and urban farming products. The company was founded in 1974 to find a profitable and environmentally friendly way of recycling manure from broiler chicken production. No synthetic fertilizers are used in the products, making them suitable for organic farming. The company emphasizes sustainable development in its operations. For example, Biolan operates its own wind power plant. In 2011 Biolan won the main prize in the French Eco Trophées competition, which rewards companies for sustainable development. Biolan is Finland's oldest company that sells and manufactures composters. The range currently includes several composter models. Some models are thermally insulated for year-round composting. In 2011, Biolan's Pikakompostori 220 won silver in the French environmental product Eco Trophées competition.
