= Bontecou Lake =

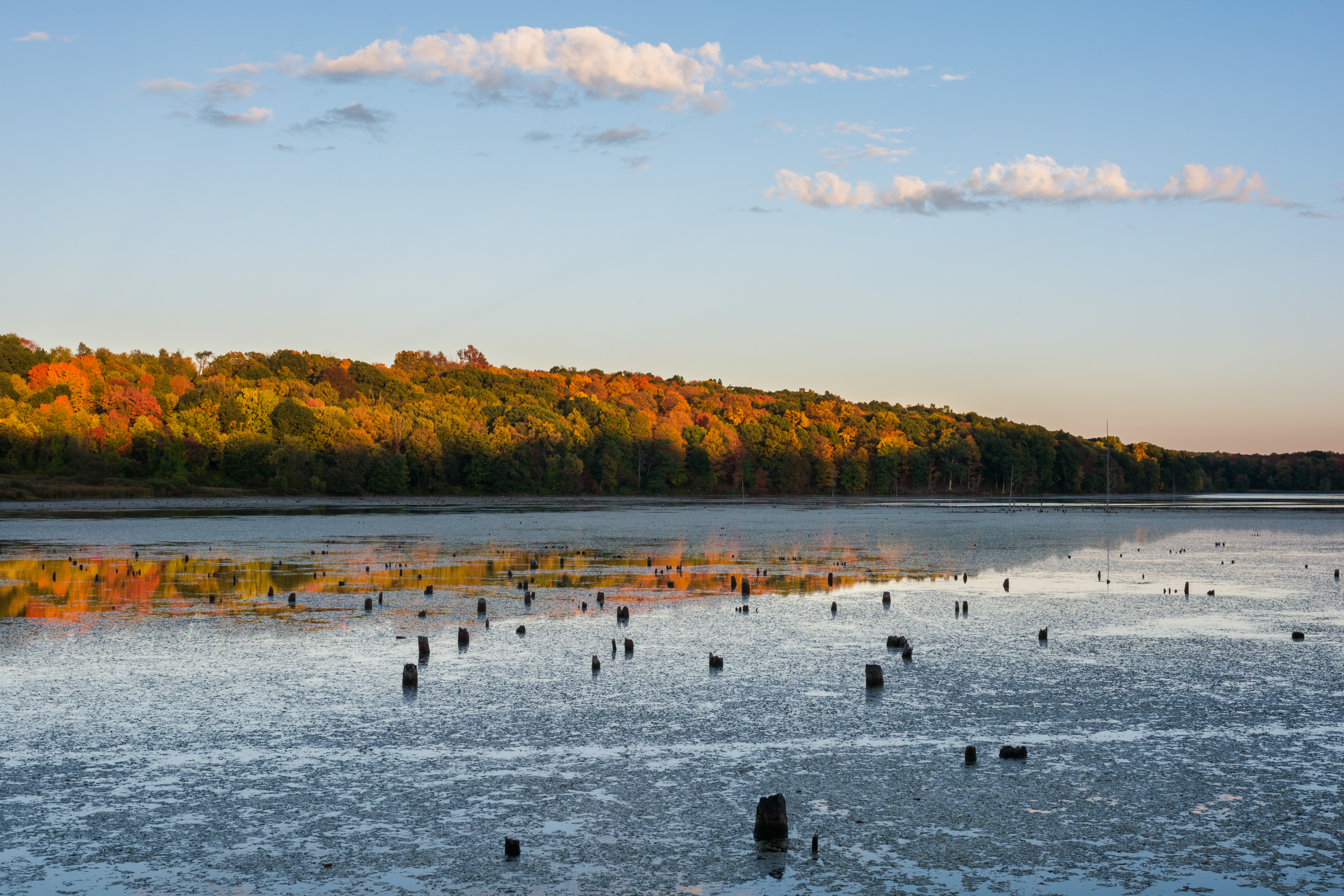
- Bontecou Lake in the autumn of 2016. Low water levels reveal many stumps of the tamarack trees that inhabited the wetland before it was flooded.

- Location within New York
- Location: Stanford and Washington, New York, United States
- Coordinates: 41°50′48″N 73°38′58″W
- Type: Rural reservoir
- Basin countries: United States
- Designation: New York State Critical Environmental Area
- First flooded: ca. 1956
- Surface area: At least 113 acres (46 ha)
- Water volume: 350,000,000 US gallons (1.3×10^{9} L)
- Surface elevation: 738 ft (225 m)

Bontecou Lake, also known as Tamarack Swamp, is a shallow, man-made bifurcation lake in the towns of Stanford and Washington, in Dutchess County, New York, less than 5 mi (8 km) from the Village of Millbrook. Bontecou Lake straddles the drainage divide between the Wappinger Creek watershed to the west and the Tenmile River. Published estimates of its area vary between 113 acres (46 ha) and 135 acres (55 ha), placing it among the largest lakes in Dutchess County. The lake and surrounding land were protected as a nature preserve in 2022.

== History and geography ==
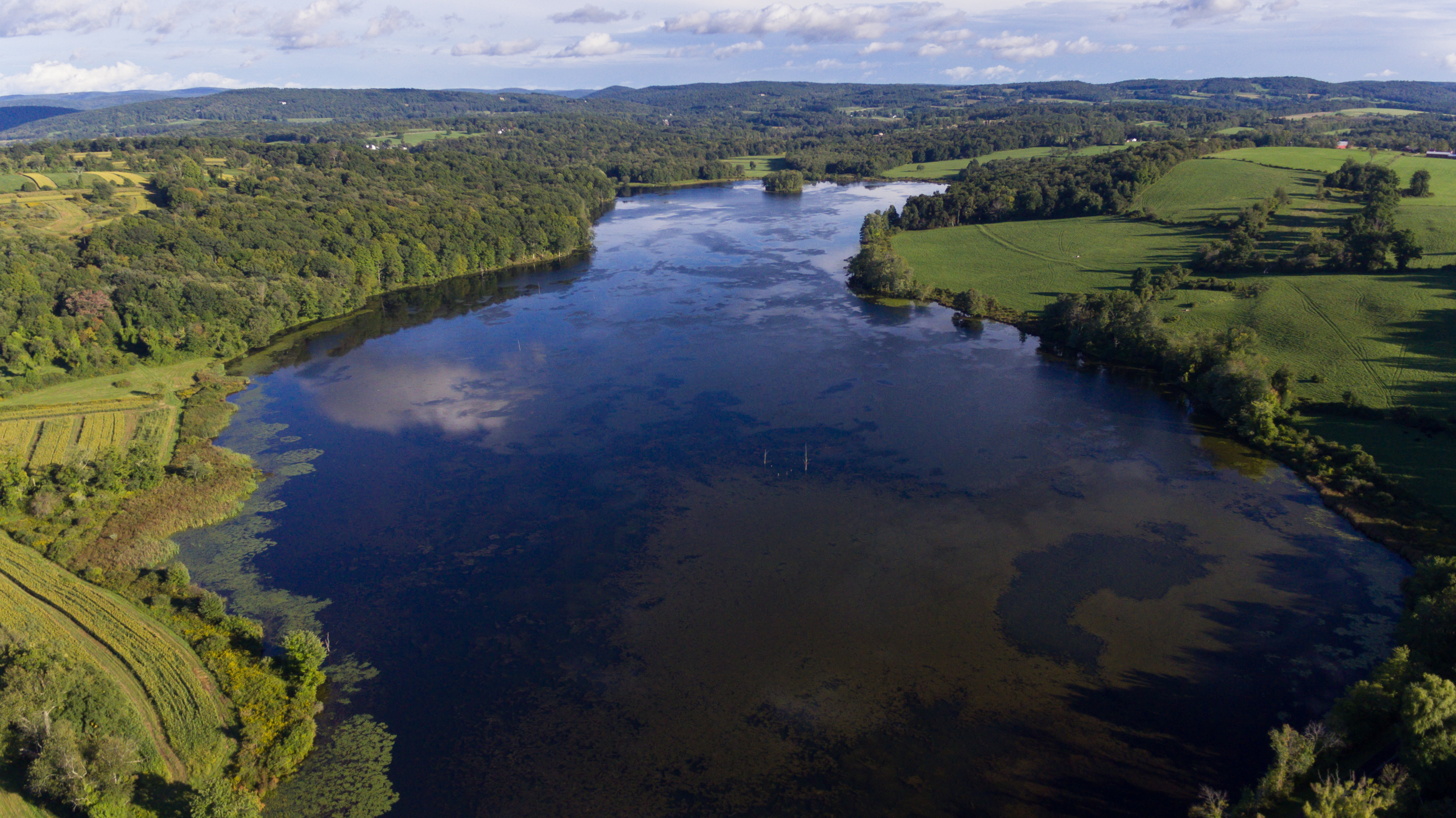
Aerial view of the lake, looking east

Bontecou Lake was created on the property of Rally Farms, founded by Frederic H. Bontecou (who would later be elected a state senator) in 1926. As the farm became renowned for its Angus cattle herd, water demands increased. Around 1956, responding to severe drought, Bontecou worked with the Dutchess County Soil and Water Conservation District to construct two earthen dams, impounding an existing, 5-to-6-acre (2 ha) pool of water at the center of a forested wetland known as Tamarack Swamp. The resulting reservoir held approximately 350,000,000 US gallons (1,300,000 m^{3}) of water for agricultural purposes and flooded at least 113 acres (46 ha) of the swamp, though estimates of its size range as high as 135 acres (55 ha). Noted for quality of fishing by the Poughkeepsie Journal in 1968, the lake experienced a severe fish die-off the next year. This was attributed to a harsh winter that killed aquatic plant life in the shallow reservoir, depleting water oxygen levels.

The lake, oblong in shape and oriented from northwest–southeast, is surrounded by woods and farmlands. It is bounded on the western end by Shuman Road.

== Hydrology ==
Bontecou Lake straddles the drainage divide between the Wappinger Creek watershed to the west and the Tenmile River watershed to the east, and it is unclear precisely where in the lake the two drainage basins diverge. The western outflow is unofficially known as Tamarack Swamp Creek, and although its sub-watershed is the sixth largest out of sixteen within the Wappinger Creek catchment area, it only contributes around 2% among major tributaries to the Wappinger Creek's total flow. During a 1999 survey, freshwater flooding from Hurricane Floyd brought Tamarack Swamp Creek discharge to 42.7 cu ft/s (1.21 m^{3}/s) on September 17, compared to 0.3 cu ft/s (0.0085 m^{3}/s) amid a dry spell in the previous month. Among the 13 bodies of water larger than 20 acres (8 ha) partially or wholly within the Wappinger Creek watershed, Bontecou Lake is the only one that has not been assigned a New York State Department of Environmental Conservation (NYSDEC) water quality classification.

== Wildlife and conservation ==
Bontecou Lake is an important wildlife habitat, and in 1987, the town of Stanford designated its portion of the lake, along with parts of the adjacent wetlands, as a Critical Environmental Area to protect the large numbers of migratory and breeding waterfowl that seek refuge there. The NYSDEC also monitors and regulates land usage in a 320-acre (130 ha) tract surrounding and including the lake, as directed by the New York State Freshwater Wetlands Act of 1975.

One of the first breeding pairs of Canada geese in Dutchess County was recorded here in 1964; before that year, only one other nesting site had been observed in the county's history. Today, the lake and swamp are home to hundreds of Canada geese year-round, with many thousands using the area as a stop-over point during migration periods. The first cackling goose ever documented in the county was also spotted at Bontecou Lake in May 1977. Dead trees extending above the surface of the water quickly made this a preferred breeding ground for great blue herons, which continue to nest on the eastern side of the lake. Though only a handful of the trees remain standing, they provide nesting opportunities for several bird species, including the eastern bluebird, for which the partially submerged trees constitute a relatively rare natural breeding site away from buildings and free of competitors.

In 2022, the property was donated to the Dutchess Land Conservancy, with a conservation easement granted to Scenic Hudson, creating a 1,250-acre (510 ha) nature preserve.

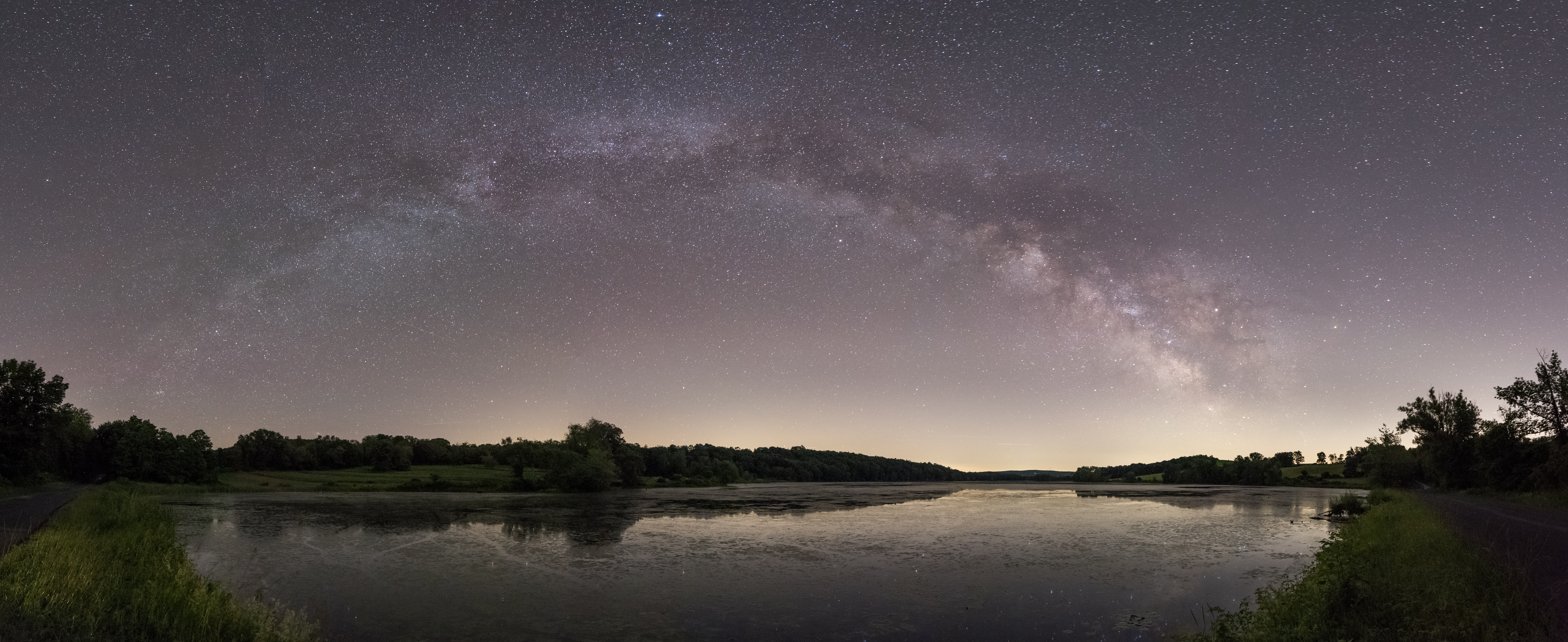
The galactic plane of the Milky Way stretched over Bontecou Lake at night, as seen from Shuman Road looking east
