= Siikainen =

- Municipality
- Siikaisten kunta Siikais kommun
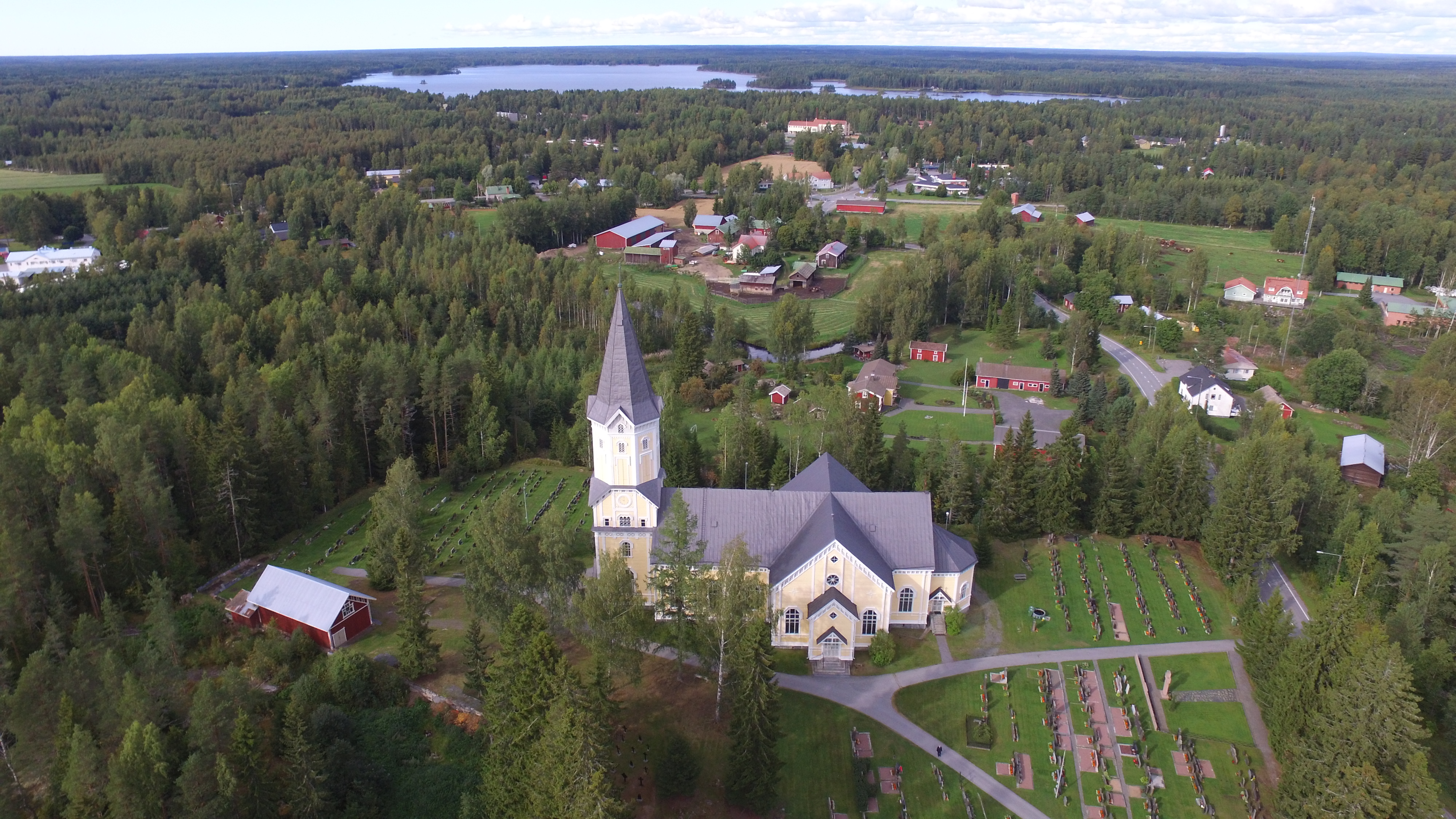
- Siikainen church

- Coat of arms

- Location of Siikainen in Finland
- Interactive map of Siikainen
- Coordinates: 61°53′N 021°49′E
- Country: Finland
- Region: Satakunta
- Sub-region: Northern Satakunta
- Charter: 1871

Government
  - Municipality manager: Heli Kaskiluoto

Area (2018-01-01)
  - Total: 491.33 km^{2} (189.70 sq mi)
  - Land: 463.32 km^{2} (178.89 sq mi)
  - Water: 28.1 km^{2} (10.8 sq mi)
  - Rank: 188th largest in Finland

Population (2025-12-31)
  - Total: 1,229
  - Rank: 283rd largest in Finland
  - Density: 2.65/km^{2} (6.9/sq mi)

Population by native language
  - Finnish: 98.5% (official)
  - Others: 1.5%

Population by age
  - 0 to 14: 11.3%
  - 15 to 64: 51.4%
  - 65 or older: 37.3%
- Time zone: UTC+02:00 (EET)
  - Summer (DST): UTC+03:00 (EEST)
- Climate: Dfc
- Website: siikainen.fi/en/

Siikainen (Swedish: Siikais) is a municipality of Finland.

It is located in the former province of Western Finland and is part of the Satakunta region. The municipality has a population of 1,229 (31 December 2025), which make it the smallest municipality in Satakunta in terms of population. The municipality covers an area of 491.33 square kilometres (189.70 sq mi) of which 28.10 square kilometres (10.85 sq mi) is inland water (2018-01-01). The population density is 3 inhabitants per square kilometre (7.8/sq mi) (31 December 2025). The municipal manager of Siikainen is Heli Kaskiluoto.

== History ==
Siikainen was founded as a chapel of the Merikarvia mother parish in 1772, when the first church was completed. Siikainen was separated from Merikarvia as an independent parish by an imperial decree on 2 December 1861. The municipality of Siikainen was founded in 1871.

The villages of Uusi- and Vanha-Samminmaja previously belonged to the municipality of Kankaanpää. Uusi-Samminmaja was annexed to the Siikainen parish in 1904.

The old church of Siikainen burned down in 1887, and the current church, representing the neo-Gothic style, was built in 1889.

The municipality is unilingually Finnish.

Siikainen hosts the buddhist center Samje, and the stupa located there was the northernmost in the world until 2016.
