= Pomarkku =

Pomarkku Påmark
- Municipality
- Pomarkun kunta Påmarks kommun
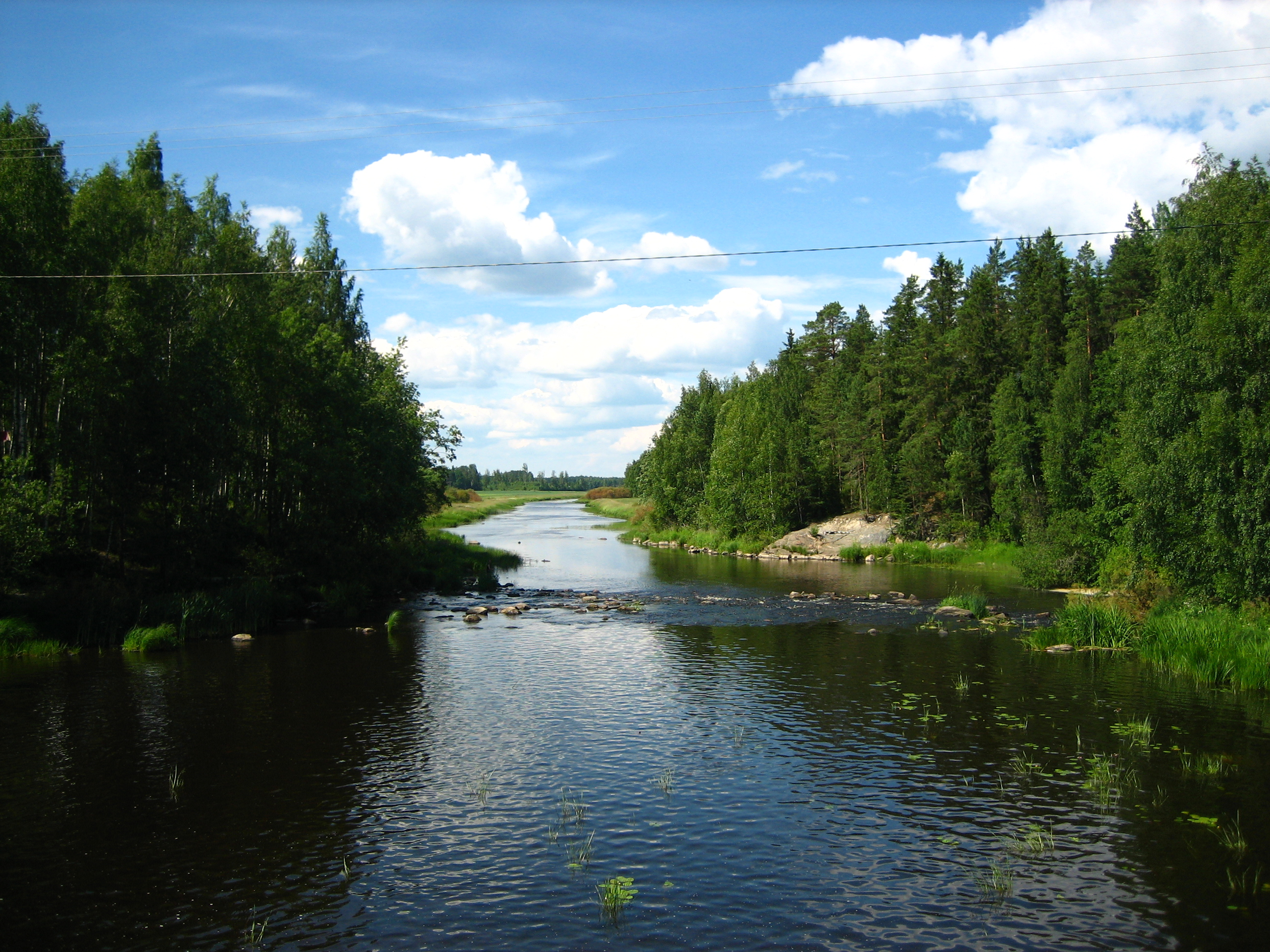
- Pomarkku River

- Coat of arms

- Location of Pomarkku in Finland
- Interactive map of Pomarkku
- Coordinates: 61°41.5′N 022°00.5′E
- Country: Finland
- Region: Satakunta
- Sub-region: Pori
- Charter: 1868

Government
  - Municipal manager: Mikko Airaksinen

Area (2018-01-01)
  - Total: 332.05 km^{2} (128.21 sq mi)
  - Land: 301.2 km^{2} (116.3 sq mi)
  - Water: 30.95 km^{2} (11.95 sq mi)
  - Rank: 233rd largest in Finland

Population (2025-12-31)
  - Total: 1,893
  - Rank: 259th largest in Finland
  - Density: 6.28/km^{2} (16.3/sq mi)

Population by native language
  - Finnish: 98.2% (official)
  - Others: 1.8%

Population by age
  - 0 to 14: 14.6%
  - 15 to 64: 53.6%
  - 65 or older: 31.8%
- Time zone: UTC+02:00 (EET)
  - Summer (DST): UTC+03:00 (EEST)
- Climate: Dfc
- Website: www.pomarkku.fi

Pomarkku (Swedish: Påmark) is a municipality of Finland.

It is located in the Satakunta region. The municipality has a population of 1,893 (31 December 2025) and covers an area of 332.05 square kilometres (128.21 sq mi) of which 30.95 km^{2} (11.95 sq mi) is water. The population density is 6.28 inhabitants per square kilometre (16.3/sq mi).

The municipality is unilingually Finnish.

== People born in Pomarkku ==
- Oskari Vihantola (1876 – 1936)
- Aulis Sileäkangas (1923 – 2013)
- Raila Aho (1937 – )
