= Satakunta =

Region of Finland

- Region
- Region of Satakunta; Satakunnan maakunta (Finnish); Landskapet Satakunta (Swedish)
- Flag Coat of arms

- Satakunta on a map of Finland
- Coordinates: 61°20′N 22°00′E
- Country: Finland
- Historical province: Satakunta
- Capital: Pori
- Other towns: Harjavalta, Huittinen, Kankaanpää, Kokemäki, Rauma and Ulvila

Government
  - Regional Mayor: Kristiina Salonen

Area
  - Total: 8,412.47 km^{2} (3,248.07 sq mi)

Population (2019)
  - Total: 216,752
  - Density: 25.7656/km^{2} (66.7325/sq mi)

GDP
  - Total: €8.077 billion (2015)
  - Per capita: €36,144 (2015)
- ISO 3166 code: FI-17
- NUTS: 196
- Regional animal: Eurasian beaver
- Regional bird: Eurasian blue tit
- Regional fish: European river lamprey
- Regional flower: Common Sea-buckthorn
- Regional lake: Pyhäjärvi
- Regional mineral: Sandstone
- Website: satakunta.fi

Satakunta (in both Finnish and Swedish, Finnish pronunciation: [ˈs̠ɑt̪ɑˌkun̪t̪ɑ]; historically Satacundia or Satagundia) is a region (maakunta / landskap) of Finland, part of the former Western Finland Province. It borders the regions of Southwest Finland, Pirkanmaa, South Ostrobothnia and Ostrobothnia. The capital city of the region is Pori. The name of the region literally means hundred. The historical province of the same name was a larger area within Finland, covering modern Satakunta as well as much of Pirkanmaa.

== Heraldry ==
The arms are crowned by a ducal coronet, though in Finnish tradition this resembles a Swedish count's coronet. Blazon: "Per fess Azure and Or, a bear rampant Sable, armed and langued Gules, crowned Or, holding in both paws a sword Argent, sword handle Or; surmounted by two mullets of seven Argent".

== History ==
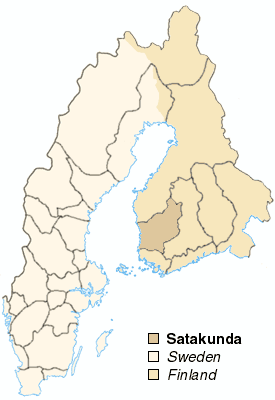
Map of the historical province of Satakunta

According to one theory, Satakunta was a political and military entity already in the Late Iron Age of Finland (550 - 1150 AD). During the 13th century, the Swedish rule was consolidated.

During the Middle Ages, the major cities of the province were Ulvila, established in the 14th century and Rauma, established 1442. Due to the rising of land, the former was left inland and lost its access to the sea. Consequently, the city of Pori was founded to the coast by Johan, Grand Duke of Finland in 1558. Administratively, the province lost its function in 1649 when it was combined with Southwest Finland to form Turku and Pori County. In the 19th century, the eastern parts of the province were transferred to the Tavastia County. At the present, the eastern part of the old province has formed the region of Pirkanmaa and the western part forms the region of Satakunta.

Satakunta, with the rest of Finland, was separated from Sweden when Finland was ceded to Russia in 1809. During the era of Autonomy (1809–1917), the province experienced slow industrialization, Pori becoming the most important industrial city of the region. The forest and textile industries dominated the business life. In addition, the merchants of Rauma and Pori had impressively large fleets of sailpowered merchantmen, which made up a large fraction of the total merchant navy of the Russian empire. The large-scale use of sail ships continued until the 1930s, even while the steampower started to dominate the international seatraffic. The building of the Tampere–Pori and Kokemäki–Rauma railroads connected the province into Finnish inland and diminished the importance of unnavigable Kokemäenjoki river as a means of transport. After this, the ports of Rauma and Pori have remained among the most important export ports for the Finnish industry.

The development of agriculture towards market-based economy was started during the 18th century, when crop rotation and large-scale drainage projects were initiated. At the same time, clearing of forests for agricultural use continued, leading into the formation of a large crofter class (Finnish: torppari), living on small-holdings rented from larger farms. During the 19th century the social divisions among the rural population deepened. Consequently, in Finnish Civil War of 1918, Satakunta formed an important part of Red Finland.

Since independence, the development of Satakunta has followed the general Finnish pattern. The rural areas have suffered from the drain of young population towards population centers, which until the early 1990s benefited the industrial cities of Rauma, Harjavalta and Pori with their surroundings. The metal and forest industries expanded steadily, necessitating the building of the nuclear plant at Olkiluoto. The increase of industrial production was not fully without problems, however. Especially the area around Harjavalta copper–nickel smelting plant suffered heavily from acid rain and Kokemäenjoki became heavily polluted. These problems have been controlled to large extent since the 1980s.

Since the 1990s, the traditional industries of the region have more or less stagnated and the relative importance of her cities has dwindled. One of the perceived reasons for this development has been the fact that Satakunta lacks a university of its own.

== Municipalities ==
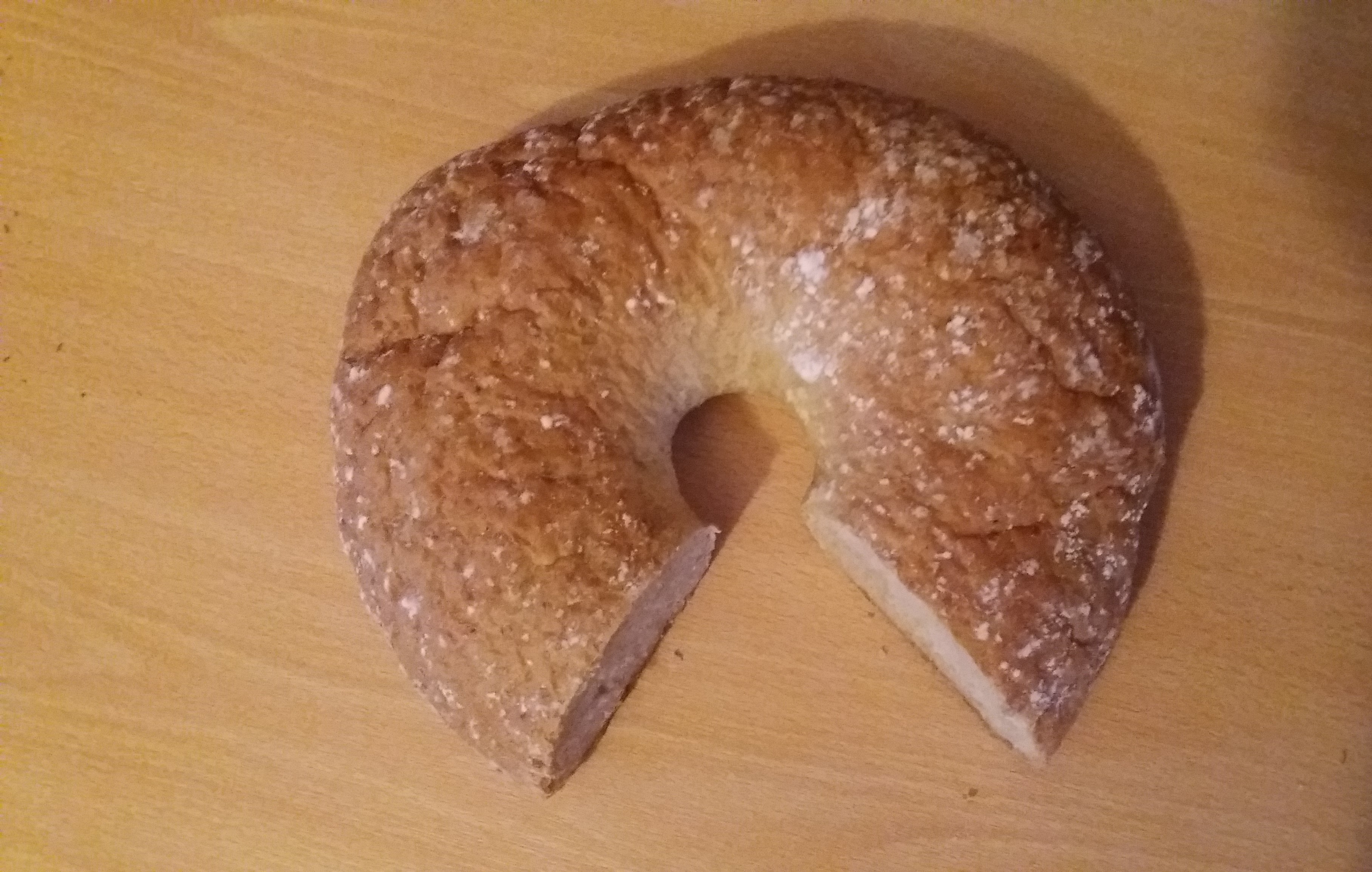
Satakunta Kakko bread

The region of Satakunta consists of three sub-regions and 16 municipalities, 7 of which have city status (marked in bold).

=== Municipalities on the map ===
Cities and municipalities of Satakunta.

=== Sub-regions ===
Northern Satakunta

- Jämijärvi
- **Kankaanpää**
- Karvia
- Siikainen (Siikais)

Rauma sub-region

- Eura
- Eurajoki (Euraåminne)
- **Rauma** (Raumo)
- Säkylä

Pori sub-region

- **Harjavalta**
- **Huittinen** (Vittis)
- **Kokemäki** (Kumo)
- Merikarvia (Sastmola)
- Nakkila
- Pomarkku (Påmark)
- **Pori** (Björneborg)
- **Ulvila** (Ulvsby)

=== Municipalities listed ===
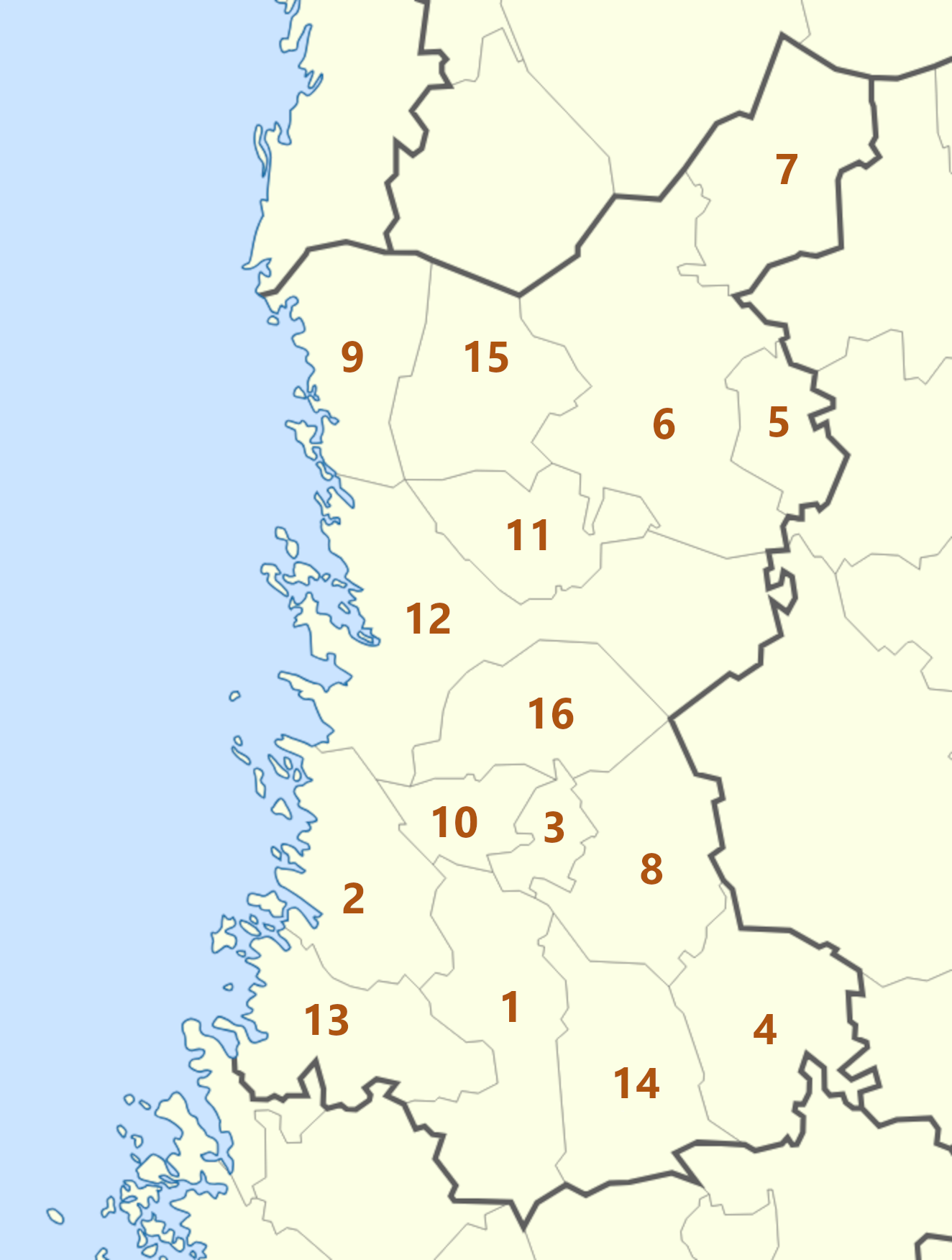
the municipalities as of 2021 (14 Säkylä, 15 Siikainen)

Coat of arms	Municipality	Population	Land area (km^{2})	Density (/km^{2})	Finnish speakers	Swedish speakers	Other speakers
coat of arms of Eura	Eura	11,005	579	19	95 %	0.2 %	5 %
Coat of arms of Eurajoki	Eurajoki	8,920	515	17	96 %	0.4 %	3 %
coat of arms of Harjavalta	Harjavalta	6,565	123	53	94 %	0.2 %	5 %
coat of arms of Huittinen	Huittinen	9,546	533	18	94 %	0.2 %	6 %
Coat of arms of Jämijärvi	Jämijärvi	1,663	215	8	97 %	0 %	3 %
coat of arms of Kankaanpää	Kankaanpää	12,508	1,021	12	92 %	0.1 %	8 %
coat of arms of Karvia	Karvia	2,133	502	4	94 %	0 %	6 %
Coat of arms of Kokemäki	Kokemäki	6,583	480	14	96 %	0.2 %	4 %
Coat of arms of Merikarvia	Merikarvia	2,834	446	6	95 %	0.4 %	4 %
Coat of arms of Nakkila	Nakkila	4,890	183	27	97 %	0.6 %	2 %
Coat of arms of Pomarkku	Pomarkku	1,893	301	6	98 %	0 %	2 %
Coat of arms of Pori	Pori	83,010	1,156	72	93 %	0.6 %	6 %
Coat of arms of Rauma	Rauma	38,773	496	78	90 %	0.3 %	10 %
coat of arms of Siikainen	Siikainen	1,229	463	3	98 %	0 %	2 %
Coat of arms of Säkylä	Säkylä	6,221	407	15	94 %	0.3 %	6 %
Coat of arms of Ulvila	Ulvila	12,339	401	31	96 %	0.3 %	3 %
	Total	210,112	7,823	27	93 %	0.4 %	6 %

== Demographics ==
Population size 1990–2025
Year	Population
1990	240,777
1995	239,255
2000	232,569
2005	228,675
2010	225,762
2015	222,957
2020	215,416
2025	210,112

== Politics ==
For parliamentary elections, the region of Satakunta forms a single constituency, Satakunta. As of 2023, the constituency elects eight of the 200 members of the Parliament of Finland.

== Geography ==
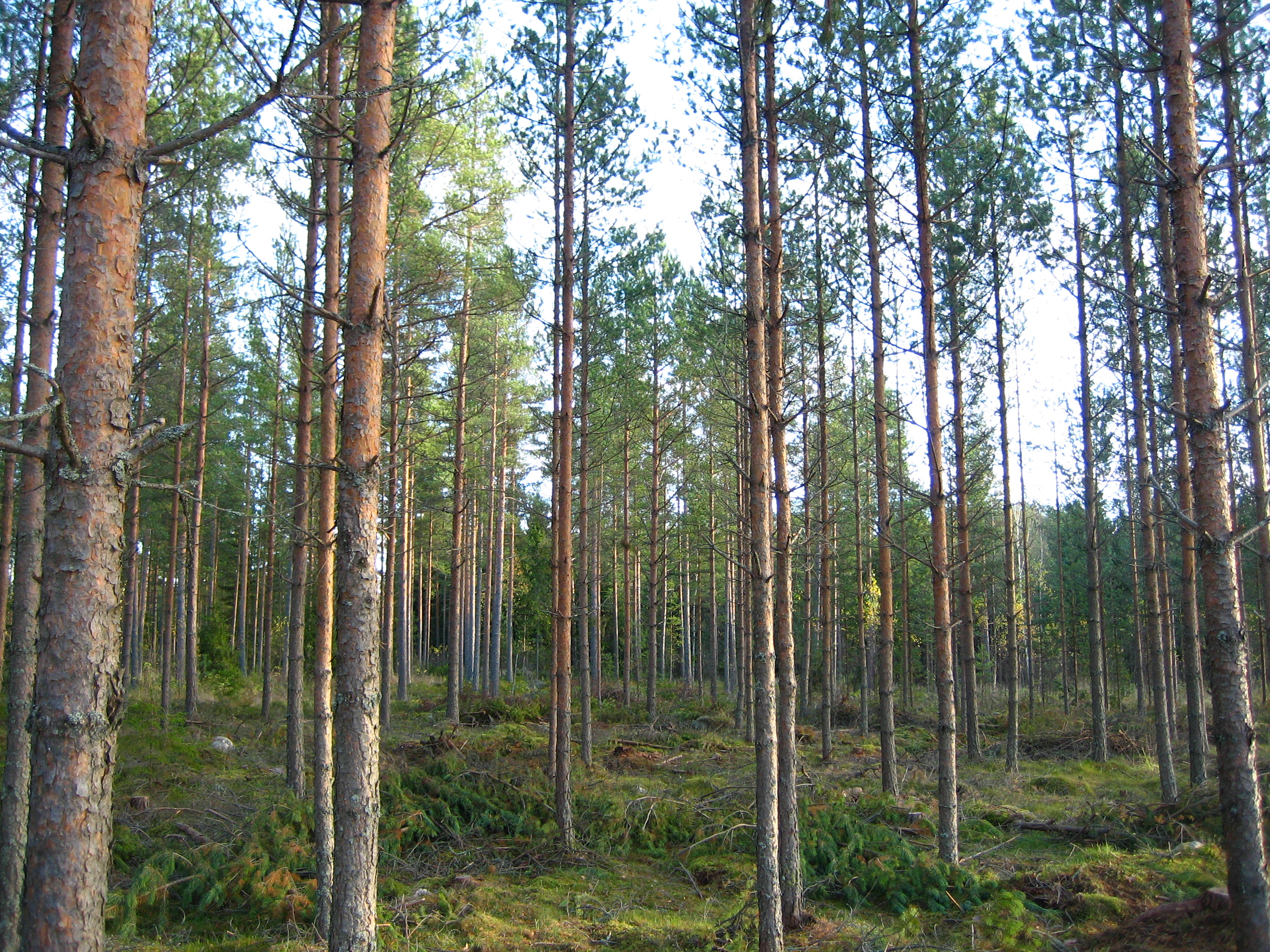
A young stand of pine forest in Northern Satakunta.

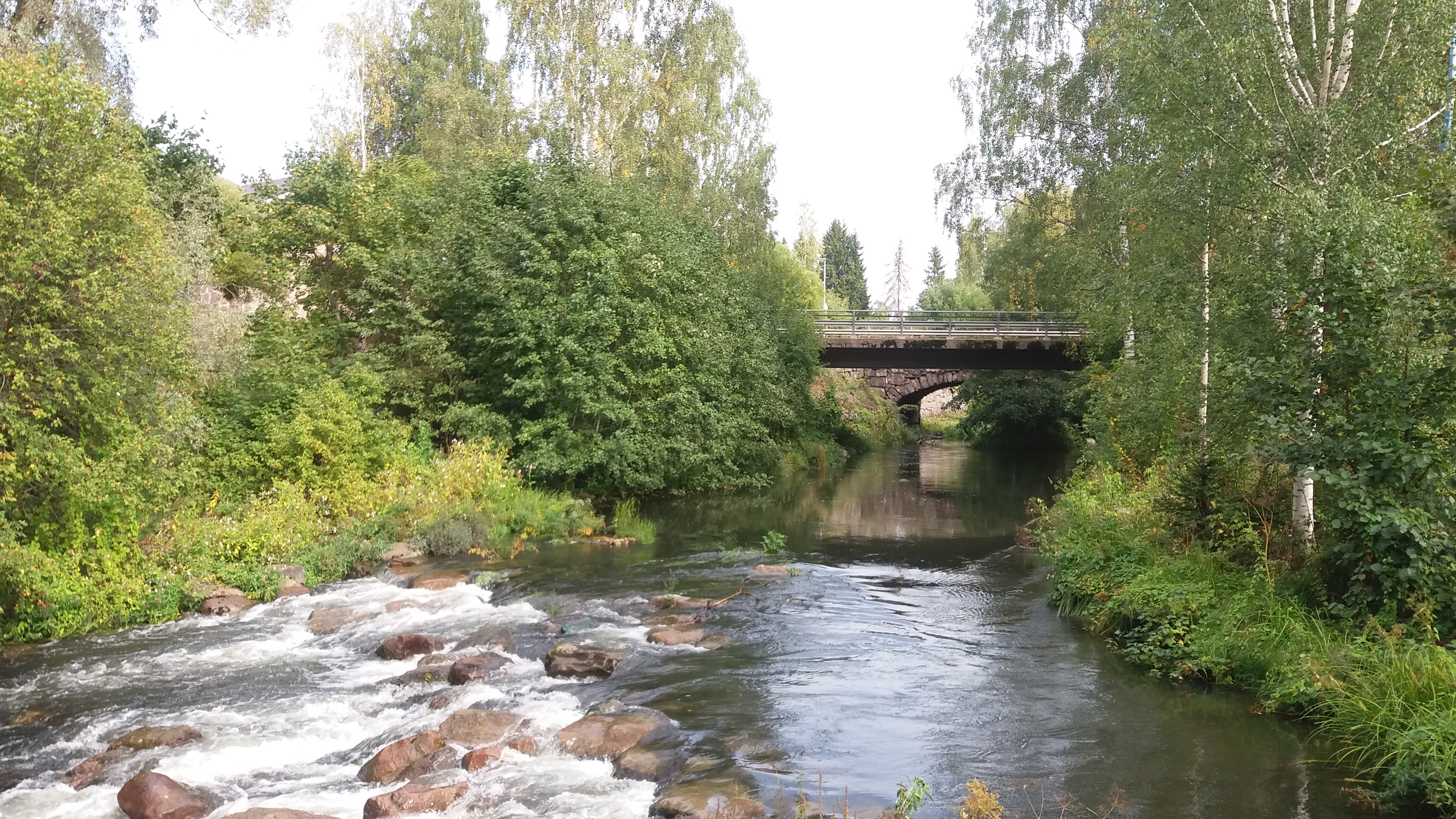
The Eura River in Panelia, Eura.

The exact borders of Satakunta towards Southwest Finland, Ostrobothnia and Southern Tavastia are rather well-defined. However, this is not the case with the Northern Tavastia, i.e. in the modern day region of Pirkanmaa. This is because northern parts of Pirkanmaa were only sparsely inhabited wilderness and the borders of the provinces were never well defined before the introduction of county system in 1634. In that year, the border between Turku and Pori County which included Satakunta, and Uusimaa and Tavastia county was rather arbitrarily drawn in Tammerkoski. To further complicate matters, Tampere with her surroundings was transferred to Tavastia Province in the 19th century. As a result, the region around Ikaalinen and Parkano is variously described as being part of Satakunta, Tavastia, Sata-Häme or Pirkanmaa.

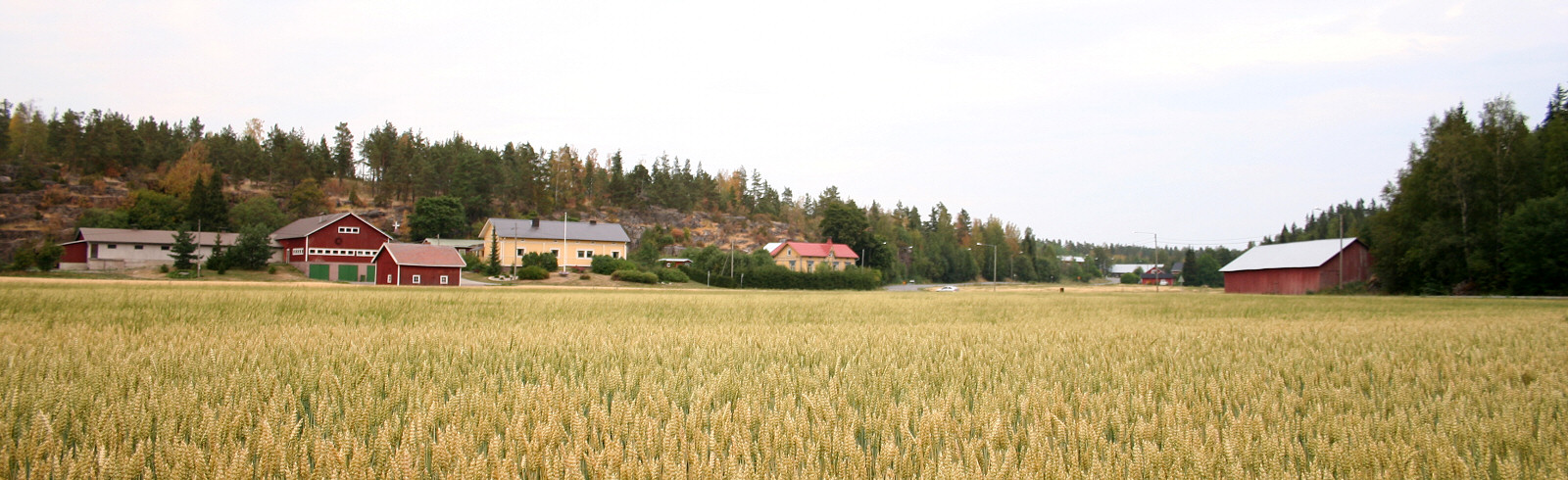
Village of Sorkka in Rauma with typical coastal plain countryside of Satakunta

Satakunta is characterized by a strong contrast of coast and inland areas. The southernmost part of the coast is flanked by the archipelago of Rauma but towards north, the number of coastal islands decreases markedly. The seabed is flat and due to this, the still-continuing post-glacial rising is perceivable even during a single person's lifetime. The dominating feature of the northern coast of Satakunta is the delta of Kokemäenjoki northwest of the town of Pori.

The valley of river Kokemäenjoki and the area south of it form one of the most important agricultural regions of Finland. The main crops are rye, barley, potato and sugar beet. On the other hand, north of Kokemäenjoki valley, forests dominate the landscape and population density is much lower than in southern Satakunta. Towards inland, the flat agricultural plain gives way to a more hilly landscape blotted by lakes. In this area, the population centers are located along the most important waterways, as a result of the original inhabitation period.

== Economy ==
In 2019, the biggest tax payers in Satakunta were Boliden Harjavalta, Raumaster, Forchem, Länsi-Suomen Osuuspankki, Oras, Alfa Laval Aalborg and LähiTapiola Lännen.
