= Eura =

- Municipality
- Euran kunta Eura kommun
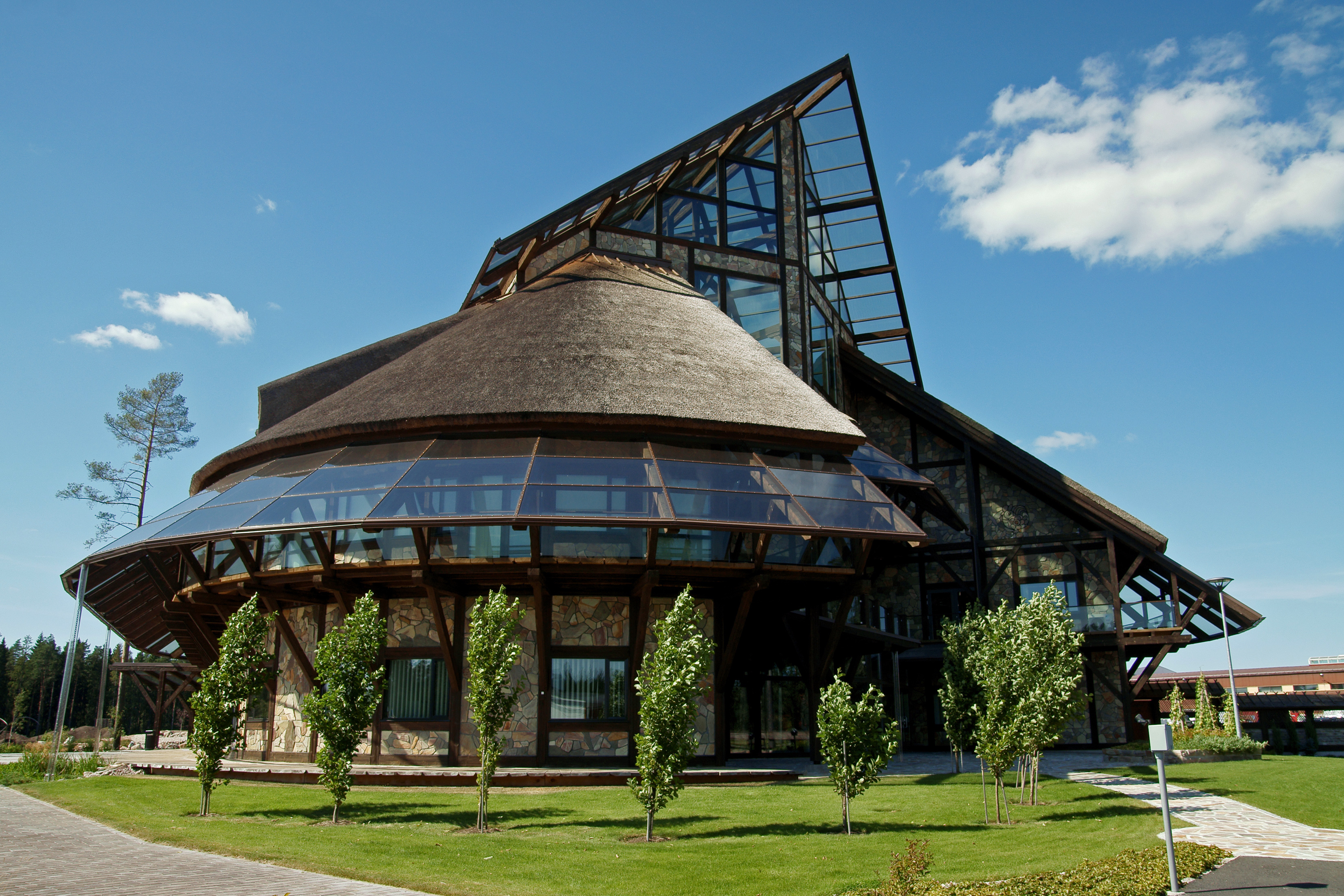
- Biolan headquarters in Eura

- Coat of arms

- Location of Eura in Finland
- Interactive map of Eura
- Coordinates: 61°08′N 022°08′E
- Country: Finland
- Region: Satakunta
- Sub-region: Rauma
- First records: 1445
- Charter: 1866

Government
  - Municipality manager: Kari Kankaanranta

Area (2018-01-01)
  - Total: 630.20 km^{2} (243.32 sq mi)
  - Land: 578.88 km^{2} (223.51 sq mi)
  - Water: 51.33 km^{2} (19.82 sq mi)
  - Rank: 146th largest in Finland

Population (2025-12-31)
  - Total: 11,005
  - Rank: 89th largest in Finland
  - Density: 19.01/km^{2} (49.2/sq mi)

Population by native language
  - Finnish: 94.8% (official)
  - Swedish: 0.2%
  - Others: 5%

Population by age
  - 0 to 14: 15.2%
  - 15 to 64: 56.4%
  - 65 or older: 28.4%
- Time zone: UTC+02:00 (EET)
  - Summer (DST): UTC+03:00 (EEST)
- Climate: Dfc
- Website: www.eura.fi

Eura (Finnish pronunciation: [ˈeu̯rɑ]) is a municipality of Finland. It is located in the province of Western Finland and is part of the Satakunta region. The municipality has a population of 11,005 (31 December 2025) and covers an area of 630.20 square kilometres (243.32 sq mi) of which 51.33 km^{2} (19.82 sq mi) is water. The population density is 19.01 inhabitants per square kilometre (49.2/sq mi).

The municipality is unilingually Finnish. The municipality of Kiukainen was consolidated with Eura on 1 January 2009.

The municipality is one of the most distinguished places in Finland in terms of pre-historical findings. The archaeological findings are mainly from the Iron Age and include e.g. ancient dress "Euran Emännän Puku".

Local tradition had it still in the 18th century that a decisive battle against invading Sweden was held in Eura's Big Meadow (Iso Niitty) in the Middle Ages. According to the story, there was blood up to man's ankles on the meadow.

== Politics ==
Results of the 2011 Finnish parliamentary election in Eura:

- Social Democratic Party 32.9%
- Centre Party 22.8%
- True Finns 16.1%
- Left Alliance 12.2%
- National Coalition Party 10.9%
- Christian Democrats 2.5%
- Green League 2.0%

== Twin towns - Sister cities ==
Eura is twinned with:

- Harku Parish, Estonia
- Askersund Municipality, Sweden

== Notable people ==
- Carl Oscar Malm, founder of Finnish Sign Language
- Darude (real name Toni-Ville Henrik Virtanen), DJ and record producer
- Elias Valtonen, basketball player

== See also ==
- Bad Boys – 2003 Finnish film about "the Daltons of Eura"
- Eurajoki
- Panelia
