= Irreligion in Finland =

Irreligion in Finland: according to Statistics Finland in 2020, 29.4% of the population in Finland were non-religious, or about 1,628,000 people. The Union of Freethinkers of Finland and other organisations have acted as interest organisations, legal protection organisations and cultural organisations for non-religious people. In a 2018 ISSP survey, 40% of the Finnish population said they did not believe in God, 34% said they believed in God and 26% did not know. Nearly one out of every five people in the country is not a member of a religious organisation, and the number of people with no religious affiliation has doubled in two decades.

== History ==
In Finland, the Enlightenment mainly influenced the educated classes. In the late 19th century, Darwinism came to Finland. The secularist philosophy of materialism was represented solely by Wilhelm Bolin, a friend of Ludwig Feuerbach, who worked as a librarian at the University of Helsinki, and who had a doctorate in Spinoza's philosophy. Bolin was one of the pioneers of cremation in Finland. Naturalistic evolutionary theory inspired, among others, Hjalmar Neiglick and Edvard Westermarck in Finland as early as the 1880s.

In 1887, Viktor Heikel and 50 other citizens attempted to found the Finnish Association for Religious Freedom and Tolerance (Finnish: Suomen Uskonnonvapaus- ja Suvaitsevaisuusyhdistyksen, Swedish: Föreningen för religionsfrihet och tolerans i Finland). The Senate sent the association's statutes to the Lutheran Church's chapter for approval, which rejected the proposal. In 1889, the newspaper Keski-Suomi, edited by Eero Erkko, published a series of articles on evolution. It led to a heated debate, involving Juhani Aho and Minna Canth, among others. The same year, Canth and A.B. Mäkelä began publication of the magazine Vapaita Aatteita ('Free Ideas') in Kuopio, which presented development theory. The magazine was discontinued because censors removed a number of the articles in the magazine.

At the turn of the 20th century, the labor movement was headed by several critics of religion. The labour movement in Finland adopted the program of Marxist atheism as a challenge to the State Church. The 1903 Forssa Program of the Finnish Social Democratic Party stated:

Religion must be declared a private matter. The Church must be separated from the State and ecclesiastical and religious communities must be regarded as private associations which organise their own affairs. Religious education must be abolished in schools.

The magazine Euterpe, published between 1902 and 1905, was written by Rolf Lagerborg, Gunnar Castrén and Georg Schauman, among others. From 1909 to 1917, S.E. Kristiansson published Vapaa Ajatus. A.B. Sarlin wrote a series of books critical of religion under the pseudonym Asa Jalas.

In 1905, the Prometheus Society, a student society, was founded at the University of Helsinki with the aim of promoting freedom of thought. The association (1905–1914) included Edvard Westermarck, Rafael Karsten, Rolf Lagerborg, Knut Tallqvist, Wilhelm Bolin, Yrjö Hirn, Georg Schauman, Hjalmar Magnus Eklund, Harry Federley, Alma Söderhjelm, Gunnar Castrén, K.H. Wiik, Viktor Heikel and Ernst Lampén. The association demanded the abolition of confessional religious education in schools and the acceptance of civil marriage. Westermarck was also a member of the English Freethinkers' Association. The tense social situation in the mid-1910s contributed to the decline of the society's activities. Civil marriage was made legal in Finland by a separate law passed in 1917.

Freethinkers had high expectations of the Freedom of Religion Act of the independent Republic of Finland, enacted in 1922. The law came into force at the beginning of 1923 and allowed citizens not to belong to religious communities. The law gave full civil rights to atheists as well. People began to leave the church. The demand for separation of church and state did not materialise, which Jussi Pikkusaari has interpreted in his dissertation as a defeat for the Social Democrats' policy on religion.

== Civil registration ==
Disappointed with the Freedom of Religion Act, freethinkers began to form civil register organisations in the late 1920s. The associations additionally set up their own cemeteries. In the early 1930s, it became more difficult for civil registrars to organise, but by the end of the decade they could continue to do so. In 1937, the Union of Civil Register Associations (Finnish: Siviilirekisteriläisyhdistysten keskusliitto) was founded as a national collective body. Following the international, 65-year-old federation, the organisation took the name the Union of Freethinkers of Finland (Finnish: Vapaa-ajattelijain liitto, Swedish: Fritänkarnas Förbund) in 1945. The union's publication appeared in 1937 under the name Ajatuksen vapaus, now Vapaa ajattelija.

As the Winter War approached, the government was called upon to disband organisations deemed suspicious. The dissolution of the key association in Tampere almost ended the civil register movement shortly before the Winter War. It was not until 1945, after the Continuation War ended, that activities resumed in earnest. The Union's headquarters were moved to Helsinki. After the Second World War, the Union of Freethinkers of Finland continued to grow and resigning one's membership in the church also became more common.

== Union of Freethinkers ==
The aim of the Union of Freethinkers is the separation of church and state and the promotion of a scientific understanding of reality. The union has around 1,500 members. According to its statutes, the union is the central organisation of associations of non-religious and non-denominational persons. Its aim is to promote the interests, rights and legal protection of non-religious people and to promote the dissemination of a scientifically based non-religious understanding of reality, criticism of religion and freedom of thought. It aims to improve the social and legal position of non-religious people by taking initiatives before the public authorities and by acting as an advocate for non-religious people in public debate. It also aims to provide information about the rights and duties of non-religious people and to educate people about non-religious customs such as naming ceremonies, civil confirmations and celebrations, marriage and funerals.

Freethinkers believe that public authorities should be neutral with respect to religion. The aim is to dismantle the state church system through legislative changes and to abolish religious education in schools, daycare centres and state universities. The two state churches, the Evangelical Lutheran Church of Finland and the Orthodox Church of Finland, should be transformed into ordinary associations which collect their membership fees like other associations and not through a church tax. The churches should have no public status and no privileges.

Leading Finnish atheist freethinkers have included V.T. Aaltonen, Väinö Voipio, Erkki Hartikainen and Kari Saari. In the 1970s and early 1980s, Erkki Hartikainen, the union's secretary-general, wanted to have a separate subject for non-religious students in Finnish schools. In 1978, Hartikainen filed a complaint with the United Nations Human Rights Committee about the curriculum of the history of religion and the history of ethics in Finnish primary schools. The complaint was resolved in 1981 and the subject of life-religion studies was introduced in Finnish schools. Since 1985, Hartikainen has headed the Finnish Atheists' Association (Finnish: Suomen ateistiyhdistystä), which he said was set up as a reserve organisation in case other organisations gave up defending the human rights of atheists.

== In public ==
From an atheistic point of view, intellectuals in Finland such as Eino Kaila, Ilkka Niiniluoto and Raimo Tuomela have contributed to the debate on the critique of religion and the scientific conception of reality.

The Union of Freethinkers has been awarding the Väinö Voipio Prize, named after its former president, judge and writer Väinö Voipio, since 1993. The purpose of the prize is to give public recognition to a person who has promoted the scientific understanding of reality and promoted the non-religiousness of ethics and society. Professor Jorma Palo was awarded the prize for his writings on humanistic ethics. Kari Cantell was awarded the prize in 1997 for his book Tiedemiehen mietteitä uskosta ('A Scientist's Reflections on Faith'). Anneli Aurejärvi-Karjalainen was awarded a prize in 1999 for her book on religion-free traditional culture, Perheen omat juhlat: Siviiliseremoniat häistä hautajaisiin ('Family celebrations: civil ceremonies from weddings to funerals') (1999). Kari Enqvist and Esko Valtaoja were awarded the prize in 2004 and 2005 for defending and disseminating a scientific and non-religious view of reality. The 2007 prize was awarded to Kimmo Pietiläinen, founder of Terra Cognita, a publishing house that publishes books on science and popular culture.

== Legislation ==
=== Evolution of social status ===
In 1959, the Advance Tax Act was adopted. From 1960 onwards, church tax was no longer withheld separately at the end of the year, but was paid in advance with each salary payment. This made the church tax more discreet and the number of people leaving the church was instantly reduced to a fraction.

In 1968, it became possible to leave the church through the population register office instead of only through the church office. Civil marriage also became possible outside the office of the marriage registrar and the civil register became the population register.

In 2003, Parliament adopted a new law on freedom of religion. The law made it possible to resign from a religious community in writing, and the resignation takes effect immediately, whereas previously the law required a personal visit to a church and a one-month reflection period. The religious status of a child aged 12 or over could no longer be changed without the child's own consent.

Atheism and leaving the church in Finland has been more characteristic of males and those living in urban areas. Men leave the church more often than women, and leaving is more common in cities than in rural areas. The value of religiosity has been found to be better preserved in rural areas than in large cities, and girls have been found to be more religious than boys.

=== Early childhood education ===
In Finland, religious education is provided at day care for children. Religious education is regulated by the Child Day Care Act and its second article, which was added to the Act in 1983. Education must respect the beliefs of the child's guardians. An alternative to religious education is education in a life philosophy. The right to freedom of thought, guaranteed by Article 11 of the Constitution, is exercised for pre-school children by the guardian, who chooses either religious education or education in a life philosophy.

The Union of Freethinkers has criticised the practice of children praying aloud in school. According to freethinkers, prayer is a violation of a child's fundamental human right to freedom of thought, which must be respected.

=== School ===
Under Article 11(2) of the Finnish Constitution, no one may be compelled to participate in the practice of a religion contrary to his or her convictions. On this basis, a pupil may not be obliged to attend a religious service, religious morning ceremony or other religious event.

The current practice is that the pupil's guardian notifies the school if the pupil does not participate in religious practices. This can be done on a one-off basis, for example when registering at school, or on a case-by-case basis. After the notification, the school must ensure that the pupil does not take part in the activities in question. The school is responsible for the safety of the pupil even if the pupil does not attend a religious event organised by the school. The school will arrange other activities for the pupil during the event. In secondary schools, the notification is made by the pupil.

Part of the opening of the school day is a religious practice. Erkki Hartikainen, former Secretary General of the Union of Freethinkers, complained to the UN Human Rights Committee that the morning ceremonies in secondary schools, as well as the morning ceremonies in primary schools, violate the rights of non-church members.

When the new law on freedom of religion was enacted, the government proposed that a new code of conduct should be written into the law; the education provider would have been obliged to inform the parents of pupils about religious services and other events considered to be religious practices, and to organise other activities during these events for children who do not participate in religious practice. Parliament deleted these articles from the bill.

=== Separation of church and state ===
In the opinion of the Union of Freethinkers, the Finnish Evangelical Lutheran Church and the Finnish Orthodox Church should be transformed into ordinary associations that do not have the right to levy taxes. The Union of Freethinkers and the Finnish Atheists' Association demand legislation regarding, among other things:

1. the dismantling of the state church system so that no religious activity is required or practised in any social activity
2. an end to social support for religious denominations
3. the abolition of religious education in kindergartens, schools and theology departments in state universities
4. the repeal of the laws on religious peace and blasphemy
5. the transfer of general funeral services to the state and municipalities.
6. abolition of the right to tax religious denominations and the right to marry

According to freethinkers, the main reason for Finns to belong to a church is the maintenance of cemeteries, although in many European countries, municipalities take care of funeral services. According to freethinkers, the church has been given a virtual monopoly on funeral services, since it receives about twice as much in community tax each year as it spends on funeral services. In their view, the discriminatory special status of religion is illustrated by the fact that companies in Finland pay tax to the church. According to the union, this is unique internationally.

Free-thinkers argue that church holidays should be removed from the list of official holidays.

=== Freedom of expression ===
In Finland, the Penal Code of 1734 provided for the death penalty for blasphemy. The Criminal Code of 1889 included a section on blasphemy. From 1890 onwards, the maximum penalty for blasphemy was four years' imprisonment, and from 1970 onwards two years.

In 1999, Chapter 17, Section 10 of the Finnish Criminal Code came into force, regarding the offence of breach of the religious peace. According to this law, a breach of the religious peace is punishable by a fine or imprisonment for up to six months. A person is guilty of breach of religious peace if one "publicly blasphemes God or, with intent to insult, publicly slanders or defames what the church or religious community referred to in the Freedom of Religion Act otherwise considers sacred, or disturbs a religious service, church service, other such religious exercise or funeral service with noise, threatening behaviour or otherwise." According to Article 2 of the Freedom of Religion Act, a religious community means an Evangelical Lutheran or Orthodox Church or a registered religious community. The Union of Freethinkers has criticised the criminal offence as unnecessary, as other laws protect the practice of religion from harassment.

=== Discrimination against the non-religious ===
When Finland joined the Council of Europe in the early 1990s, fundamental rights had to be enshrined in the Constitution, as required by the European Convention on Human Rights (ECHR). The ECHR mentions freedom of thought, conscience and religion as fundamental rights. The Finnish Constitution mentions "freedom of religion and conscience". In its 1994 report, the Constitutional Committee of the Parliament mentioned that if the proposed expression "freedom of belief" had been written into the law, it would have meant freedom of "non-religious belief". According to the Union of Freethinkers, the law has thus been left with a flaw that favours religions.

The number of students studying life-religious studies was 7.8% of all comprehensive school pupils in Finland in 2018, up from 3.3% in 2010. Although this number is increasing, it is still lower than the proportion of non-religious pupils among all pupils, which is around 10-15%.

According to non-religious organisations, the irreligious are a large and growing minority group in Finnish society, but they often face discrimination. Kaisa Virkkunen states in her 2009 PhD thesis that many irreligious people may feel unequal to others. Non-religious people may feel discriminated against in schools in terms of bullying, religious services in schools, religious education in schools, lack of religious education, preferential treatment of people of other faiths and opportunities for traditional culture. Virkkunen says that even as adults, non-religious people may face prejudice in society because of their lack of religion. It may also have an impact on their ability to find a job.

According to Kimmo Sundström of the Capital Region Atheists' Association (2009), discrimination against non-religious people has already decreased, but it will only end when Finland becomes a legally non-religious state.

== Non-religion in governmental bodies ==
When taking an oath as a witness or expert in court, one can choose between a religious oath or a religion-neutral affirmation. However, the European Court of Human Rights has not considered it acceptable for a person to have to declare their religious beliefs when taking an oath. The government's proposal for a religion-neutral affirmation was adopted and came into force in January 2016.

Previously, the military oath in the Finnish Defence Forces was also sworn "before an almighty and omniscient God", but since 2000 it has also been possible to make a religion-neutral affirmation. Since July 2015, the Defence Forces are also not obliged to attend religious services, even if they belong to a church.

== Non-religious customs ==
Non-religious customs include seasonal celebrations and life celebrations such as weddings, naming ceremonies, coming of age ceremonies, funerals and annual festivals.

In Finland, marriage can be legally performed by certain religious denominations or by a civil marriage, i.e. a marriage confirmed by a civil authority. Civil marriages are performed by a magistrate, a district judge or a registrar. The proportion of civil marriages has increased in the 2000s. The majority of civil marriages in Finland take place at the registry office during office hours, but many couples have requested the possibility of marrying outside the registry office and outside office hours.

After the birth of a child, a naming ceremony can be organised to introduce the child to family and friends.

Since the 19th century, non-religious organisations have been providing education to prepare young people for adulthood. In Germany, a secular alternative to religious confirmation, Jugendweihe, ends with a celebration. Participants are given a certificate of honour and a gift, such as a brooch. According to the Norwegian Humanist Association, in 2016 about 17% of Norwegian teenagers took part in civil confirmation.

In Finland, the Prometheus Camp Association was founded in 1990 to organise adult camps for non-religious young people. The camp usually takes place after the eighth or ninth grade, between the ages of 14 and 15. In 2008, almost 1,000 young people attended the camp, representing about 1.5% of the age group. The Prometheus camp takes its name from the Greek goddess Prometheus, who stole fire from the gods and gave it to the people. The aim of the camp is to encourage young people to reflect on issues, to understand and develop their own outlook on life, to respect themselves and others, and to take responsibility for themselves and the world. At the end of the camp, a celebration is organised in which the campers' family members can participate. At the party, campers receive a wreath made of fresh twigs or flowers and a silver Prometheus bracelet on their neck, engraved with the camper's name, the camp site and the date of the camp.

An international survey of young people's thoughts before confirmation in 2008 and afterwards in 2013 showed that Finnish young people's criticism of the church and religious traditions has increased significantly. Follow-up of the 2013 respondents will continue.

Non-religious funerals traditionally include music, a eulogy and floral tributes. The difference between a religious funeral and a non-religious funeral is that religious features such as crosses, hymns and religious speech are absent. In obituaries, the symbols of non-religious funerals are not the Christian cross but other images, such as flowers and birds, in addition to the traditional flame symbol of freethinkers. There are a few private cemeteries for non-religious people in Finland.

In 1999, Prometheus Ceremonies Oy (Pro-seremoniat) was founded, with the cooperation of the Union of Freethinkers, the Finnish Humanist Association and the Prometheus Camp. It provides information and services for civil celebrations.

== See also ==
- Atheism
- Erkki Hartikainen
- Eroakirkosta.fi
- Religion in Finland
- Secular humanism

== Bibliography ==
- Heinimäki, Jaakko & Niemelä, Jussi K.: Kamppailu Jumalasta: 12 erää uskosta. Helsinki: Helsinki-kirjat, 2011. ISBN 978-952-5874-17-4.
