= Prometheus Society =

Finnish student society

- Swedish: Studentföreningen Prometheus; Finnish: Prometheus-seura
- Formation: 1905; 121 years ago
- Founded at: University of Helsinki
- Dissolved: 1914; 112 years ago
- Type: Student society
- Purpose: Freedom of religion
- Location: Finland

The Prometheus Society (Swedish: Studentföreningen Prometheus, Finnish: Prometheus-seura) was a Finnish student society at the University of Helsinki from 1905 to 1914, whose main purpose was to promote religious freedom.

== Views ==
Its program included the abolition of compulsory baptism, confirmation and communion, the abolition of compulsory religious oaths, the abolition of compulsory religious education in schools, the introduction of civil marriage and the introduction of the right to leave the state church without the obligation to join another religious denomination at the same time, as well as the separation of church and state.

The society was an early expression of the anti-clericalism that existed among Finnish-Swedish intellectuals. Most of the reforms promoted by the society were achieved during the first few years of Finland's independence.

The Finnish-Swedish journal Studentbladet presented the Prometheus as a society in which an agnostic worldview had a repulsion for any deeper world view and which did not aim at freedom of religion but freedom from religion. In fact, the aspiration to full freedom of religion had first appeared in 1887 when the lecturer Viktor Heikel and Mathilda Asp founded Suomen uskonvapaus ja suvaitsevaisuusyhdistys ("The Finnish Society for Religious Freedom and Tolerance").

— Ilona Salomaa, Rafael Karsten (1879–1956) as a Finnish scholar of religion: the life and career of a man of science

== Members ==
The chairman of the Prometheus Society, who came under fierce attack from church circles, was Edvard Westermarck; the vice-chairman was Georg Schauman and the longest-serving secretary was historian Svante Dahlström. Other members of the society included Rafael Karsten, Rolf Lagerborg, Gunnar Landtman, Knut Tallqvist, Wilhelm Bolin, Yrjö Hirn, Hjalmar Magnus Eklund, Harry Federley, Alma Söderhjelm, Gunnar Castrén, K. H. Wiik, Viktor Heikel, Ernst Lampén and Hermann Friedmann.

== History ==
The society was founded by students of the University of Helsinki, including members of the Euterpe Society, on 20 October 1905, shortly before the beginning of the general strike. The society was ideologically secularist, humanist and liberal. Its principles were rooted in the pan-European revolution in which empiricism, evolution, and liberalism were gaining ground in the scholarly world. The society's adherents were not united in their social positions. Westermarck himself thought that the Prometheus meetings were more popular than those of any other learned society. The Prometheus Society gave lectures not only on humanistic subjects but also on theology and theosophy, with future Archbishop Erkki Kaila, among others.

In the mid-1910s, the society's activities waned as the social situation in Finland became more tense. The society was dissolved after the Civil War, when the state authorities found its activities to be propagandistic. Civil marriage was made legal in Finland by a separate law passed in 1917.

The Finnish Freedom of Religion Act was passed in 1922 and was enacted at the beginning of 1923. The new law allowed citizens not to belong to religious communities. It was only this law that gave atheists in Finland full civil rights. However, the demand for separation of church and state was not fully met.

== See also ==
- Conventicle Act
- Religion in Finland
- Irreligion in Finland
