= Jean-Baptiste Bouvier =

French theologian

- Roman Catholic Bishop of Le Mans
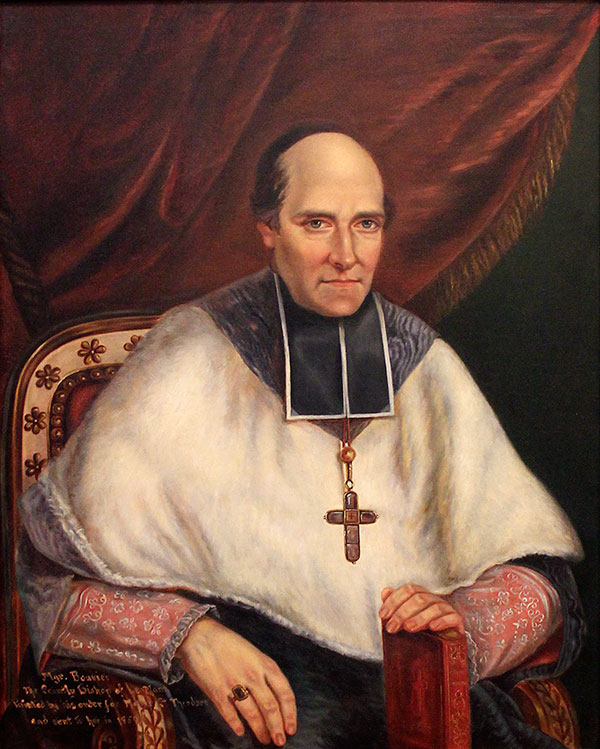
- See: Le Mans
- Appointed: November 22, 1833
- Predecessor: Philippe-Marie-Thérèse-Guy Carron
- Successor: Jean-Jacques Nanquette

Orders
- Ordination: 1808

Personal details
- Born: January 16, 1783 Saint-Charles-la-Forêt, Mayenne
- Died: December 29, 1854 (aged 71) Rome
- Buried: Le Mans
- Denomination: Roman Catholic

Jean-Baptiste Bouvier (16 January 1783 – 29 December 1854) was a French theologian and Bishop of Le Mans.

== Life ==
Bouvier was born at Saint-Charles-la-Forêt, Mayenne.

Having received merely an elementary education, he learned his father's trade of carpentry, but he gave his spare time to the study of the classics under the direction of the parish priest. In 1805 he entered the seminary of Angers, where he made rapid progress. He was ordained priest in 1808 and appointed professor of philosophy at the College of Château-Gontier. In 1811 he was transferred to the seminary of Le Mans, where he taught philosophy and moral theology. In 1819 he was made superior of that institution and vicar-general of the diocese, a position which he held until 1834, when he was raised to the episcopal see of Le Mans.

Bouvier was a confidant of Théodore Guérin, who left his diocese in 1840 to go to Indiana and begin the Sisters of Providence of Saint Mary-of-the-Woods. The two corresponded by letter frequently until his death.

During his episcopate, Prosper Guéranger revived the Benedictine Order with his foundation at Solesmes.

Pope Pius IX invited him to be present at the definition of the dogma of the Immaculate Conception in 1854. While in Rome for the Council, he fell ill and died three days later, December 29, in the presence of numerous bishops and staff. His body was returned to Le Mans, where final funeral rites were celebrated on January 23, 1856.

== Works ==
The influence exerted by his Institutiones Theologicæ (in fifteen editions), which was in use in almost all the seminaries of France, as well as in the United States and Canada, gives Bouvier a position in the history of theology during the nineteenth century. His compendium had the distinction of being the first manual, and for many years the only one well adapted to that period of transition (1830–70), marked on the one hand by the death struggles of Gallicanism and Jansenism, and on the other by the work of reform undertaken by all departments of ecclesiastical learning.

At first, Bouvier published separate theological treatises, which formed a collection of thirteen volumes (1818–33), reduced in 1834 to six, and published in that form until 1852. The author endeavoured to improve his work in the successive editions, but his failure to remove from it all traces of Gallicanism provoked criticism. A Gallican, through prejudices derived from his early training rather than from personal conviction, Bouvier readily consented to submit his work to the corrections of the theologians appointed by Pius IX. Their revision resulted in the eighth edition (1853).

Bouvier died in Rome in 1854. Subsequently, the professors of the seminary of Le Mans eliminated many imperfections which had been overlooked by the revisers of 1853. The manual was shortly afterwards adopted in more than sixty seminaries. In his work, Bouvier took a decided stand against Jansenism and adopted the doctrines of Alphonsus Maria de' Liguori.

Bouvier also composed Les mysteres du Confessional. Pyotr Ilyich Tchaikovsky mentions the book in his diary entry for May 10, 1886 (old-style calendar, see Old Style and New Style dates), "The captain gave me the suppressed book Les mysteres du Confessional."

== Commentary on Bouvier ==
In The Origin and Development of the Moral Ideas, Edward Westermarck wrote that "[a]s late as the nineteenth century the right of enslaving captives was defended by Bishop Bouvier." Bouvier, however, had written on that subject several years before attaining episcopal rank.

== Bibliography ==
- Sebaux, Alexandre-Léopold (1889). Vie de Mgr Jean-Baptiste Bouvier, évêque du Mans (in French). Paris: Retaut-Bray.
- Manuel secret des confesseurs, ISBN 2-86959-486-0
