= Ethical Relativity =

1932 book by Edvard Westermarck

- Author: Edvard Westermarck
- Subject: Ethics
- Published: 1932
- Media type: Print
- Pages: 320 (2010 Routledge edition)
- ISBN: 978-0415613712

Ethical Relativity is a 1932 book by the Finnish philosopher Edvard Westermarck, one of his main works.

== Summary ==
Westermark attacks the idea that moral principles express objective value, writing "I am not aware of any moral principle which can be said to be self-evident," and asserting that (no) "moral statements are anything more than the opinions of those who express them." The book argues for both psychological relativism (the verifiable observation that norms differ between cultures) and ethical relativism, and attempts to base ethics on the biological basis for emotions. Westermarck argues for ethical relativism by emphasizing that there is no empirical basis for objective standards in ethical theory.

== Scholarly reception ==
Ethical Relativity was a widely noted contribution to international discussion of its subject. The book was perceived as the most polemical expression of Westermarck's views, which remained little changed since he published The Origin and Development of the Moral Ideas in 1906.
