= Svante Dahlström =

Finnish historian (1883–1965)

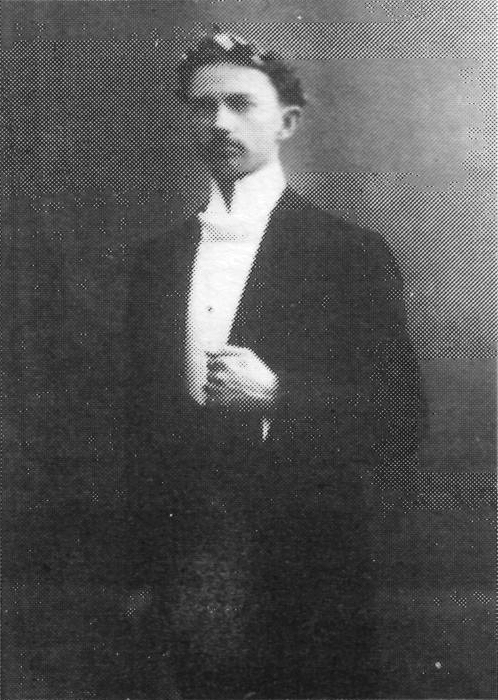
- Born: 14 October 1883; Turku, Grand Duchy of Finland, Russian Empire
- Died: 21 January 1965 (aged 81); Turku, Finland
- Occupation: Historian

Svante Dahlström (14 October 1883 – 21 January 1965) was a Finland-Swedish historian. He married music educator Greta Dahlström in 1925 and was the father of musicologist Fabian Dahlström.

Dahlström was born in Turku, Finland, in 1883 to Johan Edvard Dahlström and Augusta Charlotta Hallqvist. After graduating in 1901, he received his bachelor of philosophy in 1910 and worked for the national archive from 1912 to 1917. He was the first administrative director of the Åbo Akademi Foundation from 1917 to 1920 and secretary of the academy's consistory from 1918 to 1944. At the University of Helsinki, Dahlström was the secretary of the student society Prometheus, an organization promoting freedom of religion; he worked together with philosopher and sociologist Edvard Westermarck. He was awarded a licentiate of philosophy in 1929; his thesis was on the Great Fire of Turku and the history of the city's buildings. He was docent (associate professor) of Nordic history from 1930 to 1944, an associate professor from 1944 to 1950 and a doctor of philosophy in 1948.

Dahlström founded the Turku-Area Song and Music Society (Åbolands sång- och musikförbund) in 1922, of which he was long chairman, and he was the initiator of the Finnish Swedish Song and Music Society (Finlands svenska sång- och musikförbund) in 1929. He was also a leading figure in the organization Svenska Bildningens Vänner. Among his historical works are Åbo brand (1929) and Runsala (1942). Under the pseudonym Père Noble he published Sommar (stories, 1917) and Bokslut (poetry, 1939).

He died in Turku, Finland, in 1965.
