= Arne Runeberg =

Finnish anthropologist and linguist

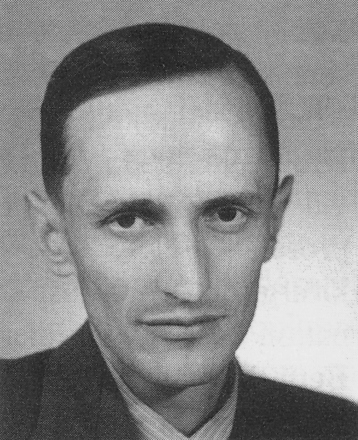
Arne Runeberg.

Sven Arne Runeberg (7 April 1912 — 15 November 1979) was a Finnish anthropologist and linguist, best known for his studies on magic, witchcraft, and sociolinguistics.

== Biography ==
Arne Runeberg was born in Helsinki into the Swedish-speaking cultural family Runeberg; his great grandfather was Finland's national poet J. L. Runeberg. Arne Runeberg attained his B.A. degree at the University of Helsinki in 1939, but World War II made a stop to his postgraduate studies. In 1947, however, he was the first student to defend his doctoral thesis, Witches, Demons and Fertility Magic, at the new Faculty of Social Sciences in Helsinki University.

Representing evolutionary anthropology, Arne Runeberg was trained by two students of Edvard Westermarck, namely Gunnar Landtman and Rafael Karsten.

After his doctoral degree, Arne Runeberg had a versatile career at several colleges in Denmark, Sweden, the United Kingdom, including London School of Economics (1961) and Umeå Social College (1964–1971). The last tenure was at his alma mater, as he was appointed the associate professor of social anthropology in Helsinki (1971–1979).

In addition to his doctoral thesis, Arne Runeberg wrote two substantial studies: Jesu korsfästelse i religionshistorisk belysning (1952) situates Jesus Christ in a long tradition of so-called carnival kings, and Some Observations on Linguistic Patterns in a Bilingual Society (1951–1954) discusses bilinguality. Runeberg himself was a bilingual Finn par excellence, using both Swedish and Finnish.

Arne Runeberg died in Helsinki, aged 67, soon after he was retired from the University.

== Writings ==
- Kortfattad finsk ordböjningslära (1945)
- Witches, Demons and Fertility Magic: Analysis of Their Significance and Mutual Relations in West-European Folk Religion (1947)
- Some Observations on Linguistic Patterns in a Bilingual Society I–II (1951–1954)
- Jesu korsfästelse i religionshistorisk belysning (1952)
- Pikku Oppikirja (1954)
- Kortfattad finsk satslära (1954)
- Finsk grammatik för mellanskolan 1–2 (1957)

== Sources ==
- Gothóni, René (2006). "Runeberg, Arne (1912–1979)". Suomen kansallisbiografia 8. Studia Biographica, 3 (in Finnish). Helsinki: Suomalaisen Kirjallisuuden Seura. pp. 401–403. ISBN 951-746-449-5. ISSN 1456-2138. Archived from the original on 2017-05-12.
- Runeberg, Arne in Uppslagsverket Finland (in Swedish).
