= Church of Finland =

The Church of Finland refers to one of Finland's two national churches:

- Evangelical Lutheran Church of Finland, the country's largest church by number of adherents
- Orthodox Church of Finland, an autonomous Eastern Orthodox archdiocese

== See also ==
- Religion in Finland
