= The History of Human Marriage =

Book by Edvard Westermarck

- The second edition
- Author: Edvard Westermarck
- Subject: Marriage
- Publication date: 1891
- Media type: Print
- Pages: 670 (2012 Forgotten Books edition)
- ISBN: 978-1297574238

The History of Human Marriage is an 1891 book by the Finnish philosopher and anthropologist Edvard Westermarck that, in the three-volume 1922 edition, 'attempt(s) a grand synthesis ... an overview of the entire world history of the institution, ...'

The Finnish philosopher Jaakko Hintikka calls the work a monumental study and a classic in its field, but notes that it is now antiquated.

== Summary ==
In the book, Westermarck defined marriage as "a more or less durable connection between male and female lasting beyond the mere act of propagation till after the birth of the offspring."

Westermarck argues that marriage is a social institution that rests on a biological foundation, and developed through a process in which human males came to live together with human females for sexual gratification, companionship, mutual economic aid, procreation, and the joint rearing of offspring.

Besides other observations and propositions, Westermarck also proposes that people who live in close domestic proximity during the first few years of their lives become desensitized to sexual attraction, and as one explanation for the incest taboo. This hypothesis has come to be known as the Westermarck effect, named after him, or as reverse sexual imprinting.

== Reception ==
David Blankenhorn calls the book one of the best histories of human marriage, and considers it deservedly famous. He comments, however, that it leaves out a great deal of material while "skimming too quickly over too much." Blankenhorn believes, however, that scholarship subsequent to Westermarck's has tended to support his conclusions.

Bertrand Russell extensively used citations from the book in Marriage and Morals.

== Bibliography ==
- Blankenhorn, David (2007). The Future of Marriage. New York: Encounter Books. ISBN 978-1-59403-081-9.
- Hintikka, Jaakko (2005). Honderich, Ted (ed.). The Oxford Companion to Philosophy. Oxford: Oxford University Press. ISBN 0-19-926479-1.
