= Ragnar Numelin =

Finland-Swedish diplomat and non-fiction writer

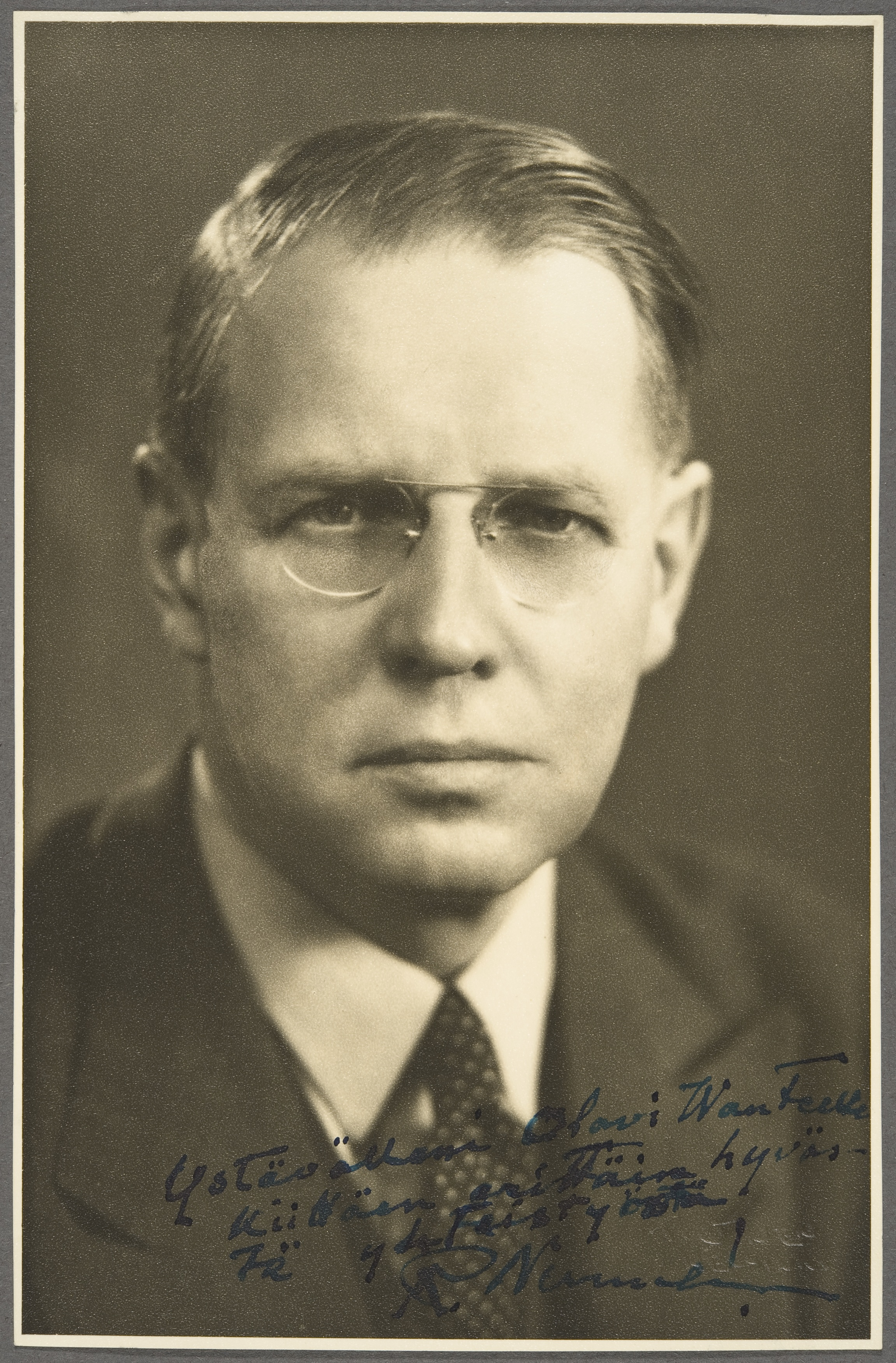
- Ragnar Numelin in the late 1930s
- Born: Ragnar Julius Nummelin; 28 September 1890; Turku, Grand Duchy of Finland
- Died: October 12, 1972 (aged 82); Helsinki, Finland
- Occupations: Diplomat, sociologist, non-fiction writer
- Spouse: Mary Adèle Alfthan (m. 1918)

Ragnar Julius Numelin (28 September 1890 – 12 October 1972) was a Finland-Swedish diplomat, sociologist and non-fiction writer. He served for 35 years in the Finnish foreign service, including as Consul General in Gothenburg and as head of mission in Brussels and Prague. Alongside his diplomatic career he was an active scholar within the Westermarck school of social anthropology and published widely on sociology, ethnology, geography and the history of diplomacy. His best-known work in English is The Beginnings of Diplomacy (1950).

== Early life and education ==
Numelin's father, Gustaf Julius Ferdinand Nummelin, was a justice of the Turku Court of Appeal and from 1900 a member of the justice department of the Senate of Finland. He was dismissed from the Senate in 1901 after refusing to accept the conscription law that the Russian imperial government sought to impose during the first period of Russification, but returned to the Senate from 1906 to 1909. His mother was Anna Emilia Sourander. As an adult, Ragnar shortened the family name Nummelin by one letter to Numelin.

Numelin matriculated in 1911 and took a Bachelor of Philosophy degree in 1913. He studied under Edvard Westermarck, and in 1918 completed a doctoral dissertation in social anthropology on migration patterns among so-called primitive peoples.

== Career ==
At the start of the First World War, Numelin became involved in the Finnish activist movement, which sought to detach Finland from Russia by armed means if necessary. He took part in the founding meeting of the Jäger Movement in November 1914, and from 1916 worked within the foreign delegation of the Finnish independence movement in Stockholm. After Finland's declaration of independence he was among the first persons sent on diplomatic assignments to Sweden. He was also an assistant at the University of Helsinki Library from 1914 to 1918. In 1918 he married Mary Adèle Alfthan, daughter of Max Theodor Alfthan, governor of the Province of Uusimaa.

After completing his doctorate, Numelin committed to a diplomatic career and served in the Finnish Ministry for Foreign Affairs for 35 years. During the Winter War and the early stage of the Continuation War he was responsible for Finland's foreign information service; the German press attaché in Finland at the time, Hans Metzger, later recalled in his memoirs that Numelin was nicknamed "Sir Ragnar". In 1945 he was appointed Consul General in Gothenburg, moving from the post of deputy head of the Foreign Ministry's political department. The transfer was understood at the time as a form of internal exile, in a period when the Finnish political left sought to place its own people in central positions within the foreign service. He nevertheless became head of mission in Brussels in 1947 and in Prague in 1950.

Numelin had been posted to Prague against his wishes, and his Western orientation led him to sharply criticise the country's then-current political system. After criticism from home, ultimately rooted in the Finnish communists' wish to install one of their own as envoy, he was recalled in 1953 and placed on inactive duty, receiving no further postings. According to "Ragnar Numelin". Biografiskt lexikon för Finland (in Swedish). Helsingfors: Svenska litteratursällskapet i Finland. urn:NBN:fi:sls-4411-1416928957017., his standing as a diplomat was held back by his versatility – his scholarly work was felt to detract from his official duties – as well as by his well-known activist background and Western orientation.

== Scholarly work ==
Numelin published widely on diplomacy, sociology, ethnology, geography and graphology. His doctoral research on migration shaped his later work, notably The Wandering Spirit (1936). His most influential book, The Beginnings of Diplomacy (1950), was translated into several languages and remains his best-known work in English-language scholarship.
