= Greta Dahlström =

Finnish music teacher and composer

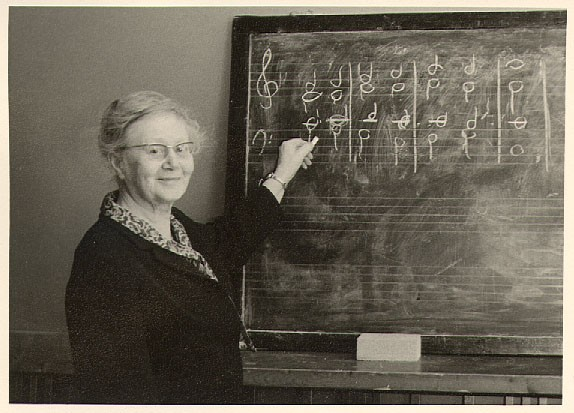
Greta Dahlström

Greta Dahlström (21 August 1887 – 23 March 1978) was a Finnish music teacher and composer. She extensively worked on composing Finnish folk music, and assisted Otto Andersson in editing Swedish folk poetry.

== Biography ==
Born on 21 August 1887 in Tyrvää, Finland, Greta Dahlström was the daughter of Edvard Otto Stenbäck and Sofia Fransiska Ramsay. After completing her studies at the Helsinki Music Institute, she taught vocal music in public schools in Helsinki and Turku.

For more than a decade, she served as secretary of the Åboland Singing and Music Association. In 1953 she became conductor of Turku Swedish Women's Choir. She also collected folk songs for the Swedish Literature Society.

In 1925 she married Svante Dahlström, a Finnish historian, and was the mother of Fabian Dahlström, musicologist.

She died in Turku, Finland on 23 March 1978.
