= Erkki Hartikainen =

Finnish atheism activist (1942–2021)

- Born: Erkki Juhani Hartikainen; 24 June 1942
- Died: 11 July 2021 (aged 79)

Erkki Juhani Hartikainen (24 June 1942, in Finland – 11 July 2021) was the chairman of Atheist Association of Finland ("Suomen Ateistiyhdistys" in Finnish, an atheistic association in Finland). He qualified for a Master of Science in the University of Helsinki in 1967. His subjects were mathematics, theoretical philosophy and computer science. Hartikainen has been the chairman of Atheist Association of Finland since 1985. Hartikainen has served as the actuary since the late 1960s, for nearly 20 years as a teacher of mathematics and science in schools, and after that, since 1989, as teacher of information technology at a college in Vantaa. From 1994–1998, he worked as a statistician in Vantaa. Hartikainen retired in 2005.

In Union of Freethinkers of Finland ("Vapaa-ajattelijan liitto" in Finnish, the biggest atheist association in Finland) Hartikainen operated for 40 years, as a chairman in 1999–2005. He was one of the leading atheist freethinkers in Finland. He was the editor in chief of the Freethinkers Union's Vapaa Ajattelija magazine for several periods since 1969. In 1982–1983 as secretary general of the Union of Freethinkers his objective was get to Finland the teaching of the "elämänkatsomustieto" ("life stance education", an alternative to religion teaching in schools), which indeed came true later.

Hartikainen complained to the human rights committee of the United Nations from the curriculum of the comprehensive school subject of the "uskontojen historia ja siveysoppi" (history of religions and ethics) in 1978. The complaint was successful and "elämänkatsomustieto" was adopted by schools as a subject.

Hartikainen was the chairman of Finland's Atheist Association (Suomen Ateistiyhdistys) since its establishment on 16 May 1985. The Atheist Association was founded as an allowance organisation in case other organisations give up the defending of the Atheist's human rights. Hartikainen was one of the head organisers of The Third World Atheist Conference with Madalyn Murray O'Hair and other of American Atheists. Conference was held in Helsinki in 1983.

In addition to the domestic operation, Hartikainen participated in the operation of the Atheist business through the foreign countries visits and corresponded regularly with other foreign atheist activists. In the 1980s he delivered the doctrine material of the "elämänkatsomustieto" of the irreligious (the history of religions and ethics of that time) into use. It was intended for WSOY to publish it but the project was cancelled. Nowadays the material is available freely on the Internet.

As a thinker, Hartikainen supported atheism and ontological materialism. He favoured the words 'reality research', 'realityconception' (conception of reality) and 'lifeconception' as better alternatives for words 'science', 'world view' and 'philosophy of life' (life stance). He supported Finnish physicist Kari Enqvist's view, that emergence means 'coarsening' and the losing of information relating to the description of reality (examples: statistical thermodynamics, classical electrodynamics, thinking of an animal etc.) Hartikainen was a modern logical empiricist and he recommended not using words "a priori truth" and saying "correct by definition" or "derivable from axioms" instead.

Hartikainen was member of Social Democratic Party of Finland.

== Bibliography ==
- Hartikainen, Erkki (1980): Tieteellinen maailmankatsomus. Helsinki: Vapaa-ajattelijain liitto ry.
- Hartikainen, Erkki (Editor in chief) (1982): Yläasteen etiikka: Peruskoulun uskontojen historian ja etiikan oppikirja 1–3. (Experiment hand-out accepted by the national board of education for school years 1982–83, 1983–84, 1984–85.) Additional edition in 1985. Helsinki: Vapaa ajatus.
- Hartikainen, Erkki, Kyösti Kiiskinen & Jussi Rastas (Editors) (2005): Suomalaisen filosofian 'enfant terrible': Kriittinen ajattelija ja tiedepoliittinen keskustelija: Juhlakirja tohtori Pertti Lindforsin 75-vuotispäivänä: Monitieteinen antologia. Contains texts in Finnish, English and German. Helsinki: Luonnonfilosofian seura. ISBN 951-98191-1-8.

== Translations into Finnish ==
- Shibles, Warren (1979): Etiikkaa lapsille ja nuorille. (Original work: Ethics, 1978.) Translator into Finnish: Erkki Hartikainen. Helsinki: Vapaa-ajattelijain liitto ry.
- Shibles, Warren (1979): Emootiot: Lisää etiikkaa lapsille ja nuorille. (Original work: Emotion, 1978.) Translator into Finnish: Erkki Hartikainen. Helsinki: Vapaa-ajattelijain liitto ry.
- Baggini, Julian (2005): Ateismi: Lyhyt johdanto. (Original work: Atheism: A Very Short Introduction, 2003.) Translators into Finnish: Erkki Hartikainen, Suvi Laukkanen ja Paula Vasama. Kustannus Oy Vapaa Ajattelija. ISBN 951-98702-1-0.
