= Warren Shibles =

American writer

Warren A. Shibles was an American philosopher, historian and professor. His B.A. is from the University of Connecticut and his M.A. from the University of Colorado. He was head of the department of philosophy of the University of Wisconsin–Whitewater. He is the author of numerous articles in history and philosophy and of many books, including children's books in philosophy and ethics. A number of his books have been translated into German, Finnish and Spanish languages.

== Bibliography ==
- Analysis of Metaphor in the Light of W.M. Urban's Theories Softcover, Language Press, ISBN 0-912386-12-6
- Good and Bad Are Funny Things: A Rhyming Book Ethics for Children Softcover, Language Pr, ISBN 0-912386-14-2
- Lying: a Critical Analysis Hardcover, Language Pr, ISBN 0-912386-20-7
- Metaphor: An Annotated Bibliography and History Hardcover, Language Pr, ISBN 0-912386-00-2
- Rational Love Softcover, Language Pr, ISBN 0-912386-13-4
- Time: A Critical Analysis for Children Softcover, Language Pr, ISBN 0-912386-17-7
- Death: An Interdisciplinary Analysis Hardcover, Language Press, ISBN 0-912386-05-3 Hardcover, Language Press, ISBN 0-912386-06-1
- Emotion in Aesthetics Hardcover, Kluwer Academic Pub, ISBN 0-7923-3618-6
- Emotion: The Method of Philosophical Therapy Hardcover, Language Press, ISBN 0-912386-07-X Hardcover, Language Press, ISBN 0-912386-08-8
- Essays on Metaphor Softcover, Language Press, ISBN 0-912386-01-0 Hardcover, Language Press, ISBN 0-912386-04-5
- Ethics: A Critical Analysis for Children Hardcover, Language Press, ISBN 0-912386-15-0
- Humor, a Critical Analysis for Young People Hardcover, Language Press, ISBN 0-912386-18-5
- Models of Ancient Greek Philosophy Hardcover, Vision, ISBN 0-85478-152-8
- Philosophical Pictures Hardcover, Kendall Hunt Pub Co, ISBN 0-8403-0562-1
- Humor Reference Guide: A Comprehensive Classification and Analysis (Hardcover) 1998 ISBN 0-8093-2097-5
- Wittgenstein Language & Philosophy (Soft cover) Wm. C. Brown Book Co., 1969 ISBN 0840303181, ISBN 978-0840303189

=== In German ===
- Lügen und lügen lassen. Softcover, ISBN 3-927223-54-9
- Ethik für alle. Lermann Verlag, Mainz. 1999.
- Was ist Zeit? Lermann Verlag, Mainz. 1997.
- Unsere Gefühlswelt. Dr. Gisela Lermann Verlag, Mainz. 1995.

=== In Finnish ===
- Etiikkaa lapsille ja nuorille. (Ethics, 1978.) Translator: Erkki Hartikainen. Helsinki: Vapaa-ajattelijain liitto ry. 1979.
- Emootiot: Lisää etiikkaa lapsille ja nuorille. (Emotion, 1978.) Translator: Erkki Hartikainen. Helsinki: Vapaa-ajattelijain liitto ry. 1979.

== See also ==
- American philosophy
- List of American philosophers
