= Gunnar Landtman =

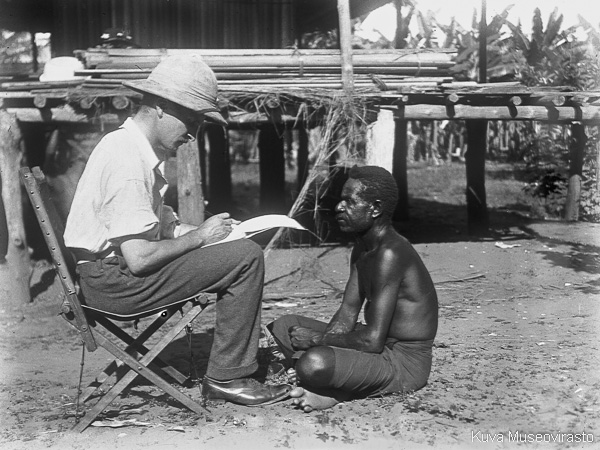
Gunnar Landtman (to the left) doing fieldwork in Papua New Guinea.

Gunnar Landtman (6 May 1878, Helsinki – 30 October 1940, Helsinki) was a Finnish philosopher as well as a sociology and philosophy professor. A pupil of Edvard Westermarck, he graduated from the University of Helsinki in 1905. He later became an associate professor there from 1910 to 1927 and then a temporary professor until his death in 1940. At the university, Landtman was a member of the Prometheus Society, a student society promoting freedom of religion.

Landtman was the first modern sociological anthropologist. He spent two years in Papua New Guinea, where he lived with Kiwai Island Papuans from 1910 to 1912. From 1922 to 1924, he served as a member of the Parliament of Finland, representing the Swedish People's Party of Finland (SFP).

== Bibliography ==
- The Origin of Priesthood (1905)
- The Primary Causes of Social Inequality (1909)
- Wanderings of the Dead in the Folk-Lore of the Kiwai-speaking Papuans (1912)
- The Poetry of the Kiwai Papuans (1913)
- The folk-tales of the Kiwai Papuans (1917)
- The Pidgin English of British New Guinea (1918)
- Papuan Magic in the Building of Houses (1920)
- The Kiwai Papuans of British New Guinea: A Nature-born Instance of Rousseau's Ideal Community (1927)
- A Descriptive Survey of the Material Culture of the Kiwai People (1937)
- The Origin of the Inequality of the Social Classes (1938)
- Nya Guinea-färden (1913)
- Papualaisten parissa (1914)
- Samhällsklassernas uppkomst (1916)
- Ur sagans barndom (1917)
- Kulturens ursprungsformer (1918)
- Finlands väg till oavhängighet (1919)
- Inledning till det filosofiska tänkandet (1920)
- Johdatus filosofiseen ajatteluun (1921)
- Immanuel Kant, hans liv och filosofi (1922)
- Naturfolkens diktning och dess betydelse (1925)
- Ett sagoland och dess infödingar (1931)
- Ethnographical collection from Kiwai district of British New Guinea in the National Museum of Finland Helsingfors (Helsinki) (1933)
- Det rättas värde (1937)
- Edv. Westermarck (1940)
- Studenter under Finlands kampår 1898-1909 (1940)
