= Rafael Karsten =

Finnish author (1879–1956)

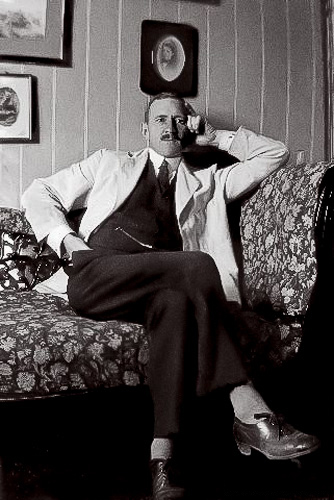
Rafael Karsten in the 1920s

Sigfrid Rafael Karsten (16 August 1879 — 21 February 1956) was a Finnish social anthropologist and philosopher of religion, known especially for his work among the indigenous people of Southern America.

== Career ==
Rafael Karsten was born in Kvevlax, Grand Duchy of Finland, to a very religious family, and his native language was Swedish. He studied philosophy at the University of Helsinki in 1899–1902 and had his first job at the British Museum.

A student of Edvard Westermarck, Karsten was critical of theological explanations of religions. He was a critic of Christianity and state religion, and a proponent of freedom of religion. Karsten defended his doctoral thesis, The Origin of Worship: A Study in Primitive Religion, in 1905 at the University of Helsinki. He was a member of the Prometheus Society, a student society promoting freedom of thought and freedom of religion.

In total, Karsten travelled six times in Southern America and studied the indigenous people and their religions — in Bolivia and Argentine, 1911–1913, in Ecuador, 1916–1918, and in the Amazonas, 1946–1947, and others — and published extensively on them in Swedish, Finnish, German, English, and Spanish. He also authored several academic course books on sociology and social anthropology.

Karsten served as the professor of practical philosophy at the University of Helsinki in 1922–1946. His pupils included Arne Runeberg.

Karsten died in Helsinki, aged 76.

== Publications in English (selection) ==
- The Origin of Worship: A Study in Primitive Religion (1905)
- Studies in Primitive Greek Religion (1907)
- Indian Dances in the Gran Chaco (South America) (1915)
- The Couvade, or Male-childbed among the South-American Indians (1915)
- Contributions to the Sociology of the Indian Tribes of Ecuador (1920)
- Studies in South American Anthropology (1920)
- The Religion of the Jibaro Indians of eastern Ecuador (1922)
- The Toba Indians of the Bolivian Gran Chaco (1925)
- Civilization of the South American Indians, with Special Reference to Magic and Religion (1926)
- Ceremonial Games of the South American Indians (1930)
- Indian Tribes of the Argentine and Bolivian Gran Chaco (1932)
- The Headhunters of Western Amazonas (1935)
- The Origins of Religion (1935)
- A Totalitarian State of the Past: The Civilization of the Inca Empire in Ancient Peru (1949)
- Studies in the Religion of the South-American Indians East of the Andes (1964)
