= Hjalmar Magnus Eklund =

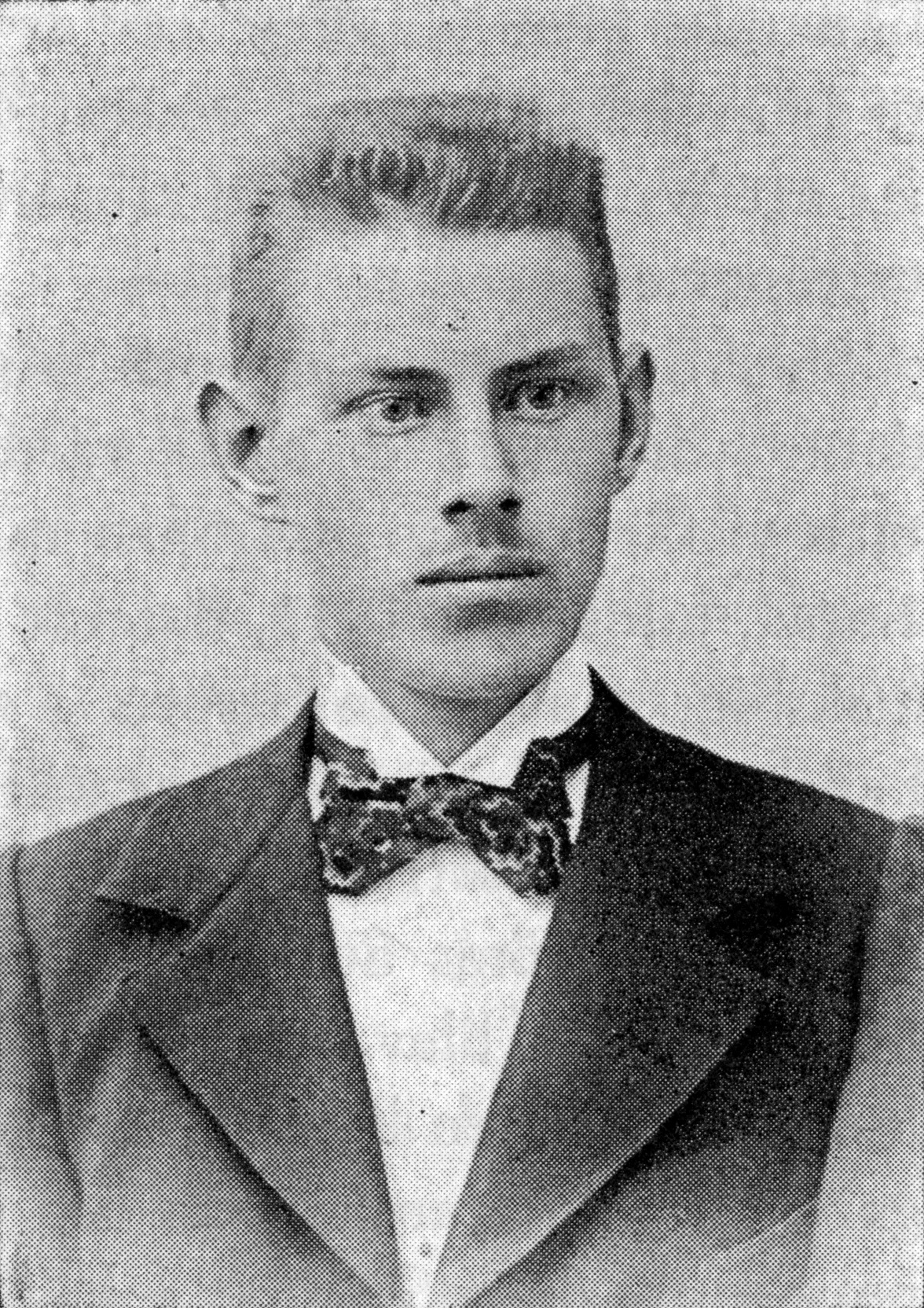
Hjalmar Magnus Eklund

Hjalmar Magnus Eklund (12 January 1880 – 10 June 1937) was the first Finnish expert in mathematical logic and philosophy and also a pioneer in the Ido language.

== Life and career ==
Eklund was born in Turku in 1880, the son of a sea captain. He was very talented in many areas. He studied mathematics, physics and philosophy at the University of Helsinki, and graduated MA in 1903. He focused on set theory, and became the first Finnish expert in logic, which was then a new area. In 1906, he worked at the linguistic department of the university where he became interested in languages.

From 1906 to 1918, Eklund worked as a teacher in different high schools in Turku and Pori. Around the same time he continued his studies and graduated with a master's degree in philosophy in 1911. He also studied in Germany in 1909 and 1910 in Göttingen, mathematics, philosophy in Leipzig in 1913 and 1914 again philosophy in Göttingen. His most important works of that time were “Russells antimoni och andra paradoxala motsägelser. Logiska undersökningar” (1916), and “Über Mengen, die Elemente ihrer selbst sind” (1918).

Immanuel Kant's philosophy in ethical thinking was a major influence on Eklund. The members of the Vienna Circle, Rudolf Carnap, Moritz Schlick, and Ludwig Wittgenstein's philosophy was familiar to him. Hjalmar Eklund was an atheist. He wrote critically but objectively in anti-religious articles. In 1906, he was involved in founding the Student Association Prometheusta and later became a member of the Committee of statehood, freedom of religion.

In addition, Hjalmar Eklund was a socialist and a journalist. In the 1918 Finnish Civil War, Eklund was imprisoned for participation in the rebellion, but he was released in November 1918. In 1919, Eklund became a Democrat in Turku, later a Socialist. There he wrote several articles on artificial languages including Ido.

Later in 1919, Eklund formed the Finnish Workers' Educational Association (STL), and became its secretary. In 1926 he returned to Helsinki and worked for an insurance company until 1933. Hjalmar Eklund died in 1937 in Pargas, only 57 years old.
