= Union of Freethinkers of Finland =

- Vapaa-ajattelijain Liitto ry
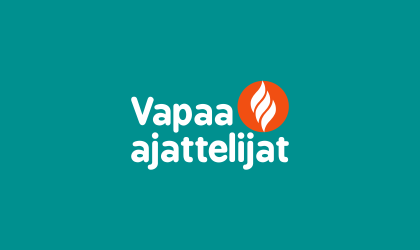
- Formation: 1937; 88 years ago
- Headquarters: Helsinki
- President: Jori Mäntysalo
- Publication: Vapaa Ajattelija

The Union of Freethinkers of Finland (Finnish: Vapaa-ajattelijain Liitto ry, Swedish: Fritänkarnas Förbund rf) is the largest secularist and freethought organisation in Finland. The organisation supports the rights of those Finns who hold no religious affiliation, and promotes a science-based, rational and critical world view and humanistic ethics.

The organisation was founded in 1937 under the name the Union of Civil Register Associations (Finnish: Siviilirekisteriläisyhdistysten keskusliitto).

The Tampere section of the organisation created the Eroakirkosta.fi website in 2003, which offers an electronic service for resigning from Finland's state churches.
