= The Origin and Development of the Moral Ideas =

Book by Edvard Westermarck

- The second edition (1924)
- Author: Edvard Westermarck
- Language: English
- Subject: Ethics
- Publisher: Macmillan Publishers
- Publication date: 1906
- Media type: Print (Hardcover and Paperback)
- Pages: 852
- ISBN: 978-1298546562

The Origin and Development of the Moral Ideas is a book by the Finnish philosopher Edvard Westermarck, published between 1906 and 1908. One of his main works, it is a monumental study and a classic in its field, though now antiquated.

== Summary ==
Westermarck, in the preface to The Origin and Development of the Moral Ideas, describes the background to his work. Having concluded that there is a close connection between moral opinions and religious beliefs, he decided to acquire first-hand knowledge of the folklore of a non-European people, and to that end spent four years in Morocco collecting anthropological data, familiarizing himself with the native way of thinking, and gaining an understanding of local customs. He was also indebted to British science and thought.

In his introduction, Westermarck asks why different cultures have different moral views. Throughout the book, he attacks the idea that moral principles express objective value.

== Reception ==
Wainwright Churchill criticizes Westermarck's claim that the Greeks of the Homeric era were unaware of or repudiated pederasty, citing the contrary view of classical scholar Hans Licht. Westermarck's use of the expression "homosexual love" has been given as an early example of the use of the word "homosexual" in English. The classicist David M. Halperin writes in One Hundred Years of Homosexuality (1990) that Westermarck's book formed part of a trend to interpret Greek sexual conventions in an anthropological and ethological context, an approach that contrasts with earlier scholarly studies that proceeded from the assumption that classical Greek society was virtually unique in its acceptance of pederasty.
