= Karl Wiik =

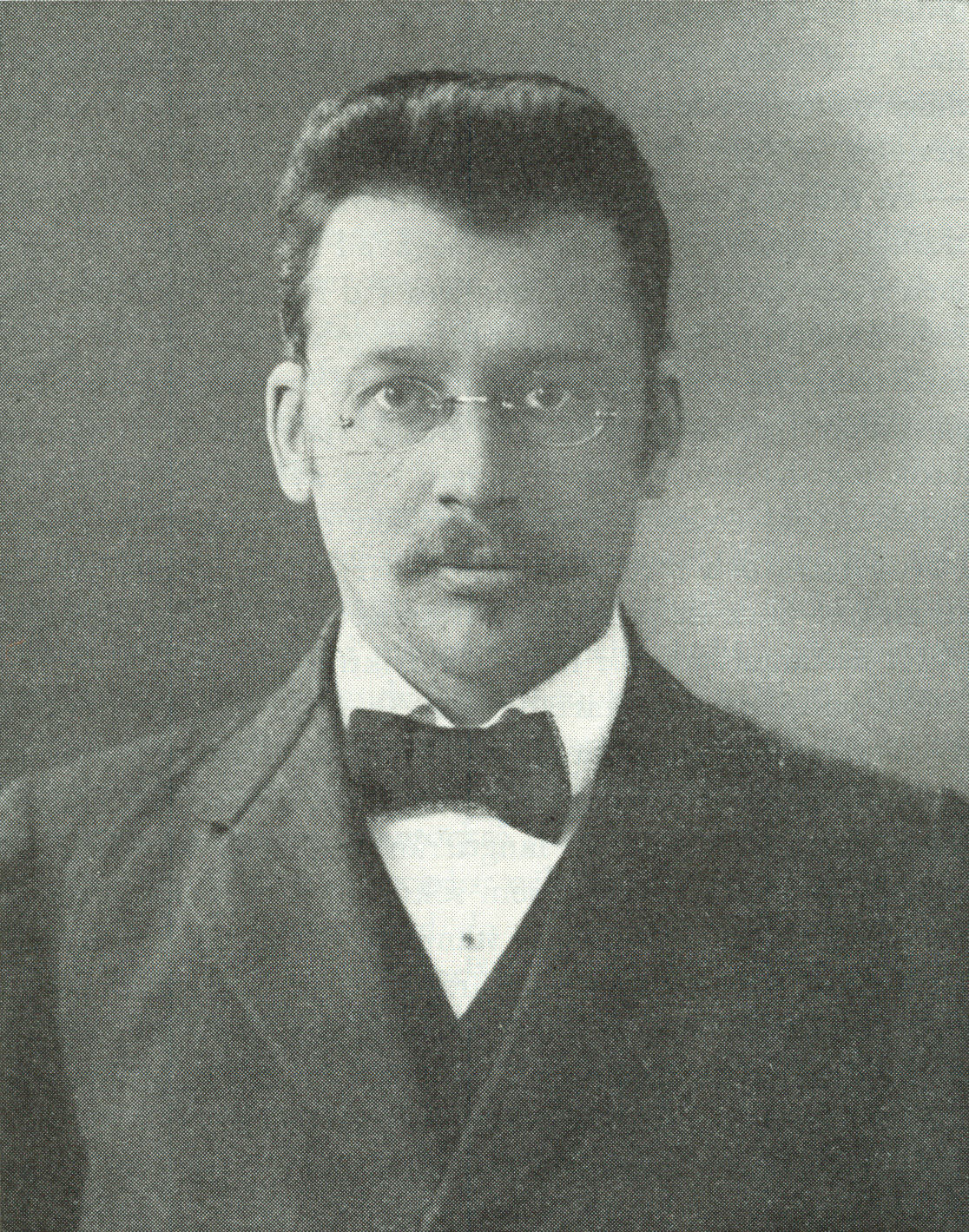
- K. H. Wiik c. 1910

Member of the Parliament of Finland
- In office 1911 – 1918 (SDP), 1922 – 1929 (SDP), 1933 – 1941 (SDP > Soc.), 1944 – 1946 (SKDL)

Personal details
- Born: Karl Harald Wiik; April 13, 1883 Helsinki, Finland
- Died: July 26, 1946 (aged 63) Helsinki
- Party: Social Democratic Party of Finland
- Other political affiliations: Finnish People's Democratic League

Karl Harald Wiik (13 April 1883 – 26 June 1946) was a Finnish journalist and politician. Elected to parliament numerous times between 1911 and the time of his death and Secretary of the Social Democratic Party of Finland (SDP) for more than a decade, Wiik is remembered as one of six radical SDP members of parliament expelled from the SDP in the aftermath of the Winter War with the Soviet Union.

Imprisoned during the years of World War II, Wiik was released in 1944, becoming a leader of the Finnish People's Democratic League (SKDL), a left wing political organization dominated by the registered Communist Party of Finland (SKP).

== Biography ==
=== Early years ===
Karl Harald Wiik was born 13 April 1883 to a Swedish-speaking Finnish family in Helsinki.

=== Political activity ===
Wiik was a Member of the Finnish Parliament representing the SDP in 1911–1918, 1922–1929, 1933–1941 and representing the SKDL in 1944–1946, to his death.

=== Revolutionary period ===
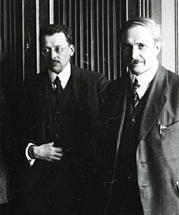
SDP politicians K. H. Wiik and Yrjö Sirola in 1917

An influential member of the Party's left wing, he was imprisoned for a time after the Finnish Civil War for having participated in the rebel government, Finnish People's Delegation of the Red Guard of Finland.

=== Interwar years ===
After the Civil War, Wiik emerged as a leader of the left wing of the SDP, taking an uneasy view of the successful effort of the influential SDP centrist Väinö Tanner to cobble together a coalition government late in 1926. Wiik and others on the SDP left felt that an overly reformist orientation and efforts to build alliances with non-socialist moderates would have the effect of driving radical Finnish workers away from SDP and into the arms of Otto Kuusinen and the illegal Finnish Communist Party.

Wiik was elected Secretary of the SDP in 1926 and served in that capacity until 1936, working during that time to maintain the organization's commitment to establishment of an explicitly socialist government elected by mobilization of the wage earners and radicalized farmers. Wiik was unsuccessful in building a radical mass political organization, however, with SDP membership falling from a peak of just over 67,000 in 1919 to about 25,000 during the last half of the 1920s and early 1930s, with three of the party's main constituencies — workers, small farmers and young people — each largely unenthusiastic about the party, its program, and its prospects.

=== Expulsion and imprisonment ===
In 1940 he and five other Social Democratic MPs were expelled from the Social Democratic Party over their agitation for civil liberties and support for friendlier relations with the Soviet Union. The six expelled MPs formed the short-lived Socialist Parliamentary Group. All of whose members spent the years 1941 to 1944 in prison, because they were convicted of treason against the Nazi collaborationist government during the Continuation War.

Upon their release from prison in September 1944 after the armistice with the Soviet Union, Wiik and the other formerly jailed members of the Socialist Parliamentary Group were among the founders of the SKDL, a united front organization of the Finnish radical left dominated in practice by the SKP. Shortly after joining the SKDL, Wiik came into conflict with the SKP over his open advocacy of socialism, as the SKP feared that mentioning socialism in the programme could drive away voters. Wiik, in contrast, wrote that "For me, Socialism is the most important thing; one must not sell it in order to win a few bourgeois votes."

=== Death and legacy ===
K. H. Wiik died on 26 June 1946 in Helsinki. He was 63 years old at the time of his death. Wiik's papers, including an extensive diary, are housed by the People's Archive.

== Works ==
- Arbeterskor!. Skrifter utgifna af Finlands Svenska Arbetareförbund n:o 5. Helsingfors 1907.
- Till Marx’ minne. Tvänne uppsatser [To Marx's Memory: Two Essays]. With Runar C. Öhman. Helsingfors: Folktribunens förlag, 1908.
- Berättelse över Helsingfors' svenska arbetarförenings värksamhet 1898-1908. Helsingfors: 1908.
- Kovan kokemuksen opetuksia: sananen Suomen työväelle.Helsinki: Kansanvalta, 1918.
- "Die demokratisierung Deutschlands und die baltischen länder" [The Democrats of Germany and the Baltic States], Der Sozialist, 1921; pg. 38.
- "Finnland auf dem wege zur demokratie" [Finland on the Road to Democracy], Der Sozialist, 1922; pg. 6.
- Die Arbeiterbewegung in Finnland [The Workers' Movement in Finland]. With N.R. Ursin. Leipzig: 1926.
- Eri maiden sos.-dem. puolueiden keskuselinten kokoonpano: selostus. Helsinki: Social Democratic Party Committee, 1930.
- Väkivaltaa ja taantumusta vastaan!. Sos.-dem. Puolueen vaalikirjanen 1930, n:o 1. Sos.-dem. puoluetoimikunta, Helsinki: 1930.
- Mot våld och förtryck! [Against Violence and Oppression!] Helsinki: Social Democratic Party, 1930.
- Keskustelua kuolemanrangaistuksesta: piirteitä kysymyksen vaiheista eduskunnassamme; koonnut K. W. Tekijä, Helsinki 1935.
- Finnland in der Krisenzeit [Finland in the Crisis Period]. n.c.: n.p, 1934.
- Raittiusliike työväenliikkeen kasvattajana. Helsinki: Finnish Social Democratic Publishing House, 1937.
- Työväki ja varusteluvimma: uuden perushankintaohjelman johdosta. Helsinki: 1938.
- En finsk justitieförbrytelse: K. H. Wiiks brev till en bemärkt riksdagskollega, i vilket han fastslår att han och hans kamrater blivit oskyldigt dömda, ingår i denna skrift [A Finnish Criminal Offense: K.H. Wikk's Letter to a Noted Parliamentary Colleague, Finding that His Comrades Have Been Innocently Convicted]. With Viktor Brand (pseudonym of Anders Viktor Johansson). Stockholm: Hjälpkommitén för Finlands politiska fångar, 1944.
- Karl H. Wiiks dagbok: från storstrejken till upproret 1917-1918 [Karl H. Wiik's Diary: From the Great Strike Till the Uprising of 1917-1918]. Sven Lindman, ed. Turku: Turku Academy, 1978.
