= Eroakirkosta.fi =

Finnish website

- Website: eroakirkosta.fi
- Launched: 2003
- Current status: Active

Eroakirkosta.fi is a Finnish website which offers an electronic service for resigning from Finland's state churches; the Evangelical Lutheran Church of Finland and the Finnish Orthodox Church. "Eroa kirkosta" translates to "resign from the church".

The website was created by Freethinkers of Tampere, an organisation that supports a formal separation of church and state, and opened on 21 November 2003. The Finnish law on freedom of religion was updated on 1 August 2003 and then allowed resigning from religions without a visit to a bureau. Because eroakirkosta.fi is not maintained by magistrates, the website can not directly resign a person from a church. Instead, the website forwards the filled-in resignation forms to magistrates who then complete the resignation. Resignations through e-mail are allowed because the Finnish law requires resignations to be "in writing" but not "signed". Eroakirkosta.fi also gives the user the alternative to print the resignation form and send it through regular mail.

Eroakirkosta.fi became popular very quickly. Within ten weeks over 1,400 people had resigned through the website. In 2004, almost 39% of all resignations in the country were done through eroakirkosta.fi. In 2005, the percentage increased to 68.9. In 2006, almost four out of five persons resigned through the website. The total resignation rates in Finland have also increased. The number of people resigning from the state churches has tripled in six years (2000–2006), and the 2005 and 2006 resignation numbers both break the old record of 30,710 from 1992. 47 300 members left the church through the service in 2008, that is 91% of all resignations (52,200). In 2011, 46,502 resignations and in 2012, 41,261 resignations were registered at the Eroakirkosta.fi site.

== Publicity ==
The web service received publicity in October 2010, after a gay rights panel discussion on TV on 12 October was followed by thousands of people resigning from the Evangelical Lutheran Church by using the service.

== Resignation statistics ==
From inception through the end of 2017 more than 700 000 Finns out of a total population of 5.5 million resigned using the Eroa Kirkosta website, for the number of resignations by year refer table below.

Year	All resignations	Through eroakirkosta.fi	Percentage
2003	26,857	~1,000	~3.7
2004	27,009	10,459	38.7
2005	33,043	22,770	68.9
2006	34,952	27,672	79.2
2007	37,879	32,418	85.6
2008	52,203	47,333	90.7
2009	43,650	39,200	89.8
2010	83,097	79,200	95.3
2011	46,177	45,000	97.5
2012	41,079	40,200	97.9
2013	58,965	54,300	92.1
2014	78,300	79,393	101.4
2015	45,241	45,029	99.5
2016	50,119	48,927	97.6
2017	52,292	50,535	96.4
2018	58,338	56,897	97.2
2019		51,837	
