= Edvard Westermarck =

Finnish sociologist (1862–1939)

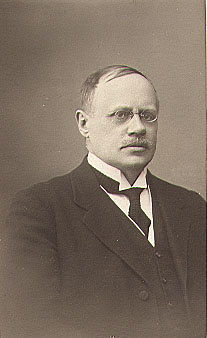
- Born: 20 November 1862; Helsinki, Finland
- Died: 3 September 1939 (aged 76); Tenala, Finland
- Education: University of Helsinki
- Known for: Westermarck effect First rector of Åbo Akademi University; First professor of sociology in England; Ethical relativism
- Scientific career
- Fields: Sociology, social anthropology, philosophy
- Workplaces: London School of Economics, University of Helsinki, Åbo Akademi University
- Doctoral students: Ragnar Numelin; Rafael Karsten; Gunnar Landtman; Hilma Granqvist

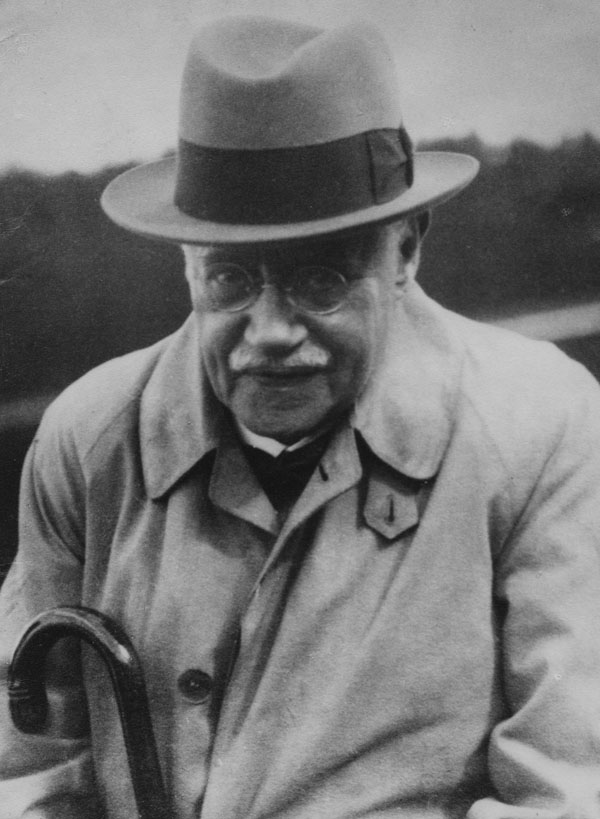
Portrait of Westermarck

Edvard Alexander Westermarck (20 November 1862 – 3 September 1939) was a Finnish social anthropologist, sociologist and philosopher. He was the most internationally prominent Finnish scholar of his time, known for his work on the history of marriage and the origin of moral ideas. He was the first to lecture on sociology in both England and the Nordic countries, and held professorships at the London School of Economics, the University of Helsinki and Åbo Akademi University, where he also served as the first rector. He is perhaps best remembered today for the Westermarck effect, the hypothesis that children raised in close proximity develop a natural aversion to sexual relations with each other. His scholarly interest in human sexuality and marriage has been linked by some biographers to his own presumed homosexuality.

In the UK, his name is often spelled Edward. His sister, Helena Westermarck, was a writer and artist.

== Biography ==
=== Early life and education ===
Westermarck was born in 1862 in a well-off Lutheran family, part of the Swedish-speaking population of Finland. His father worked at the University of Helsinki as a bursar, and his maternal grandfather was a professor at the same university. It was thus natural for Edvard to study there. He enrolled in 1881, initially studying aesthetics, literature and history before turning to philosophy, and obtained his degree in 1886. During his studies he also developed an interest in anthropology and read the works of Charles Darwin.

During his student years, he was exposed to the naturalistic and evolutionist ideas of the time, with Herbert Spencer and Darwin as key influences. Among the most prominent local representatives of these naturalistic and evolutionist ideas was the promising young researcher Hjalmar Neiglick, who died prematurely but had a significant influence on Westermarck during his student years. He participated in the Philosophical Society founded by professor Thiodolf Rein, where he received the impulse for his later work on the development of moral ideas. While Rein and much of the academic establishment were strongly influenced by the German idealist tradition, Westermarck was drawn instead to British empiricism and the emerging discipline of empirical sociology.

Westermarck's doctoral thesis, The Origin of Human Marriage (1889), was shortly afterwards expanded into The History of Human Marriage, published in 1891 and later substantially revised in 1921.

=== Academic career ===
In 1892, Westermarck became a lecturer in sociology at the University of Helsinki. In 1904, he was appointed lecturer in sociology at the London School of Economics, and in 1907 promoted to professor, becoming one of the first Martin White Professors of Sociology (with Leonard Trelawny Hobhouse). He was the first to lecture on sociology in England, as well as in the Nordic countries.

In Helsinki, Westermarck applied for the philosophy chair vacated by Rein. Both the historico-philological section and the consistory placed him in the first position on the shortlist, but acting vice-chancellor J. R. Danielson-Kalmari intervened, apparently on language-political grounds, and appointed the Finnish-minded Arvi Grotenfelt instead. The subject was then split into theoretical and practical philosophy, and in 1906 Westermarck was called to the chair of practical philosophy, which also encompassed sociology. He occupied that chair until 1918, when he moved to Åbo Akademi University in Turku. An arrangement allowed him to hold his London and Helsinki (later Turku) professorships in parallel, and to spend part of each year in Morocco. In 1898 Westermarck first visited Morocco, and was immediately captivated by the country. At a later visit he bought a house in Tangier and learned the local Arabic dialect. He spent several extended periods in Morocco throughout the rest of his life, conducting fieldwork that gave his anthropological research a new direction — from broad comparative studies towards in-depth investigation of a single society.

While at Helsinki University, in 1905, he became the first chairman of the newly founded student association Prometheus, which worked for religious freedom. His students included Ragnar Numelin.

While still teaching philosophy in Turku, he helped found academic sociology in the United Kingdom, becoming the first Martin White Professor of Sociology (with Leonard Trelawny Hobhouse) in 1907 in the University of London.

Westermarck also served for some years, between 1918 and 1921, as Rector of the Åbo Akademi University. The rectorship passed to mathematics professor Severin Johansson in 1921, reportedly due to disagreements over the university's direction: Westermarck wanted Åbo Akademi to develop into a high-quality research university, while Johansson was supported by a faction that emphasised vocational training.

=== Later years ===
He retired in 1932, and spent the rest of his life completing and publishing his major works, Ethical Relativity (1932), Three Essays on Sex and Morals (1934), The Future of Marriage in Western Civilization (1936) and Christianity and Morals (1939), the latter published in the year when he died. In 1929, he had published the English version, Memories of My Life of his autobiography, originally published in Swedish in 1927.

Westermarck died in Tenala on 3 September 1939, two days after the German invasion of Poland. According to his biographer Rolf Lagerborg it was the outbreak of war that broke his will to live.

== Views ==
=== Marriage and the Westermarck effect ===
He has been described as "first Darwinian sociologist" or "the first sociobiologist", as well as "an authority in the history of morals and of marriage customs." He denied the then prevailing view that early human beings lived in sexual promiscuity, arguing that in fact historically monogamy preceded polygamy. He maintained that "Marriage is rooted in the family rather than the family in the marriage".

The phenomenon of reverse sexual imprinting, the diminution in sexual attraction between persons who lived in close domestic proximity during the first few years in the life of either one, now known as the Westermarck effect, was first formally described in his thesis The History of Human Marriage (1891).

=== Morocco ===
Westermarck was also a scholar of Morocco and offered a positivist view of how its folk religion was formed in his two-volume work Ritual and Belief in Morocco (1926). He also studied marriage in Morocco, publishing Marriage Ceremonies in Morocco in 1914.

=== Moral philosophy ===
Westermarck critiqued Christian institutions and Christian ideas on the grounds that they lacked foundation. He was also a moral relativist and in his two-volume The Origin and Development of Moral Ideas (1906–1908) he argued that moral judgements are not rational but are based on emotions and on social approval or disapproval. As a consequence, he also denied the existence of general or universal moral truth.

== Political engagement ==
In 1899, Westermarck mobilised support among Western European intellectuals against Emperor Nicholas II's Russification policies, in defence of Finland's cultural autonomy. One of the original reasons he spent time in London was that he did not feel safe in Helsinki or Turku because of this advocacy.

When the League of Nations considered the Åland question in 1920–1921, Westermarck represented the Swedish Assembly of Finland before the assembly. Although the Ålanders almost unanimously favoured joining Sweden, Westermarck argued that it was vital for the Finland-Swedish minority that Åland remain part of Finland.

He also worked for popular education in Finland, notably in connection with the founding of the Västankvarn folk high school in Ingå.

== Influence and legacy ==
Westermarck had a considerable influence on the development of anthropology. Bronisław Malinowski, his student in London and one of the most prominent anthropologists of the 20th century, credited Westermarck as a model for his classical fieldwork on the Trobriand Islands. Claude Lévi-Strauss described Westermarck as the last and most notable representative of the English anthropological school. Among his Finnish students were Rafael Karsten, Gunnar Landtman, Hilma Granqvist and K. Rob. V. Wikman. He also influenced the art theorist Yrjö Hirn and the philosopher Rolf Lagerborg.

After World War II, anthropology's qualitative descriptions of foreign cultures gave way in the West to a sociology oriented towards quantitative studies of one's own society. The last representative of the scholarly paradigm Westermarck had introduced in Finland was Arne Runeberg. The Finnish sociologists' learned society still bears Westermarck's name. In certain respects, Westermarck's ideas anticipated the sociobiological and evolutionary psychological currents that became dominant in the behavioural sciences a century later, after a period during which scholars had emphasised the uniqueness of individual cultures. His insistence on seeking direct biological explanations for human behavioural patterns, and his use of evidence from the animal kingdom, place him as a forerunner of these later developments. Paradoxically, it was the fieldwork methodology he developed in his Moroccan studies that proved more lastingly influential than the comparative method of his early works.

== Books ==
- 1891: The History of Human Marriage. 3 Vol, Macmillan, London.
- 1906: The Origin and Development of the Moral Ideas. 2 Vol, MacMillan, London
- 1907: Siveys ja kristinusko: Esitelmä. Ylioppilasyhdistys Prometheus, Helsinki.
- 1914: Marriage Ceremonies in Morocco. Macmillan, London.
- 1919: Tapojen historiaa: Kuusi akadeemista esitelmää: Pitänyt Turussa syksyllä 1911 Edward Westermarck. 2nd edition. Suomalaisen kirjallisuuden seura, Helsinki.
- 1920: Religion och magi (Religion and magick), Studentföreningen Verdandis Småskrifter 149, Albert Bonniers Förlag, Stockholm
- 1926: Ritual and Belief in Morocco. 2 Vol.
- 1926: A short History of Human Marriage. Macmillan, London.
- 1929: Memories of My Life.
- 1930: Wit and Wisdom in Morocco. Routledge, London.
- 1932: Ethical Relativity.
- 1932: Avioliiton historia. WSOY, Helsinki.
- 1932: Early Beliefs and Their Social Influence. London: Macmillan.
- 1933: Pagan Survivals in Mohammedan Civilisation. London: Macmillan.
- 1933: Moraalin synty ja kehitys. WSOY, Helsinki.
- 1934: Three Essays on Sex and Marriage. Macmillan, London.
- 1934: Freuds teori on Oedipuskomplexen i sociologisk belysning. Vetenskap och bildning, 45. Bonnier, Stockholm.
- 1936: The future of Marriage in Western Civilisation. Macmillan, London.
- 1937: "Forward" in The Wandering Spirit: A Study of Human Migration. Macmillan, London
- 1939: Kristinusko ja moraali (Christianity and Morals). Otava, Helsinki.
