= List of lakes of Finland =

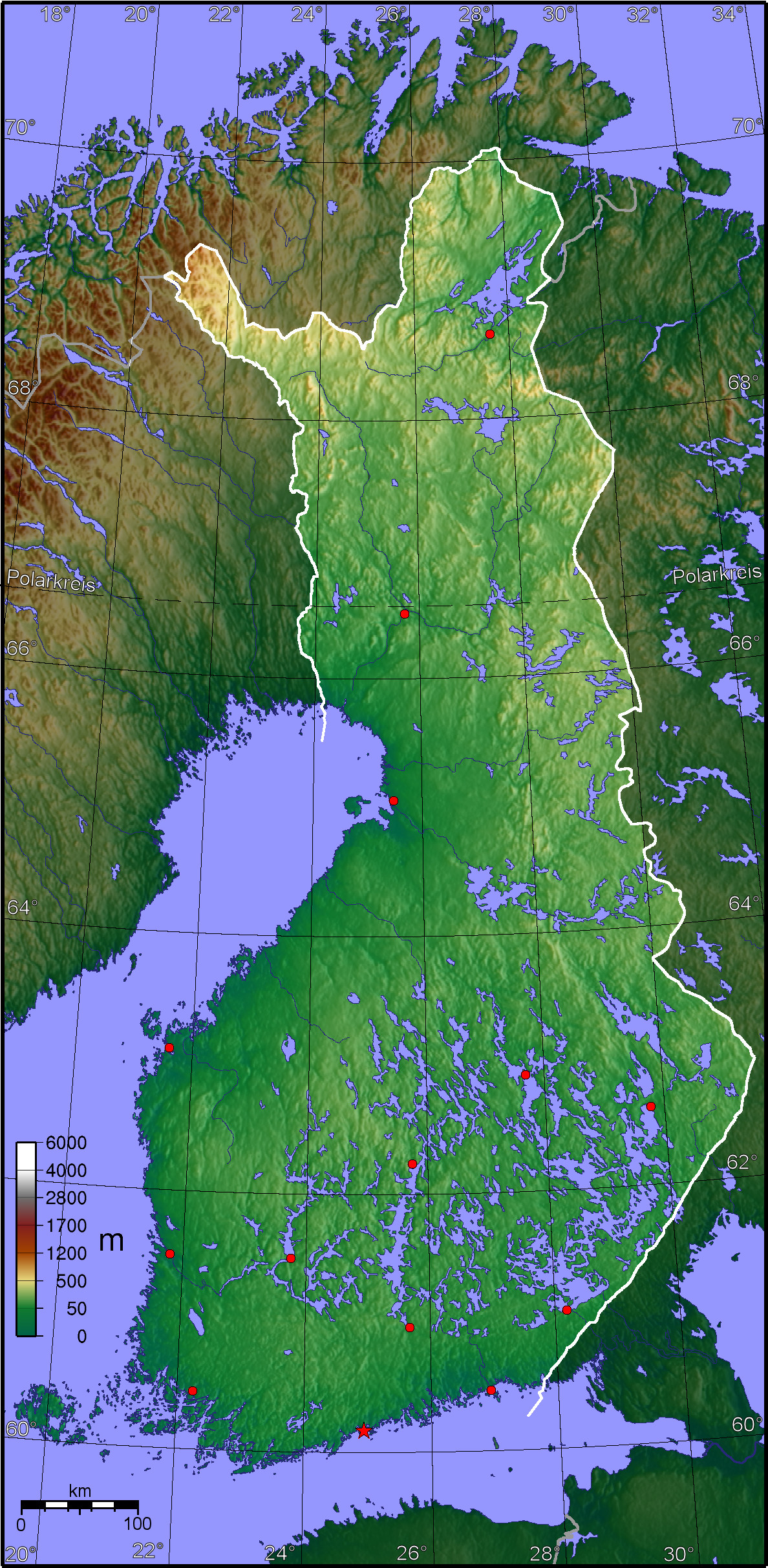
Topographic and hydrographic map of Finland.

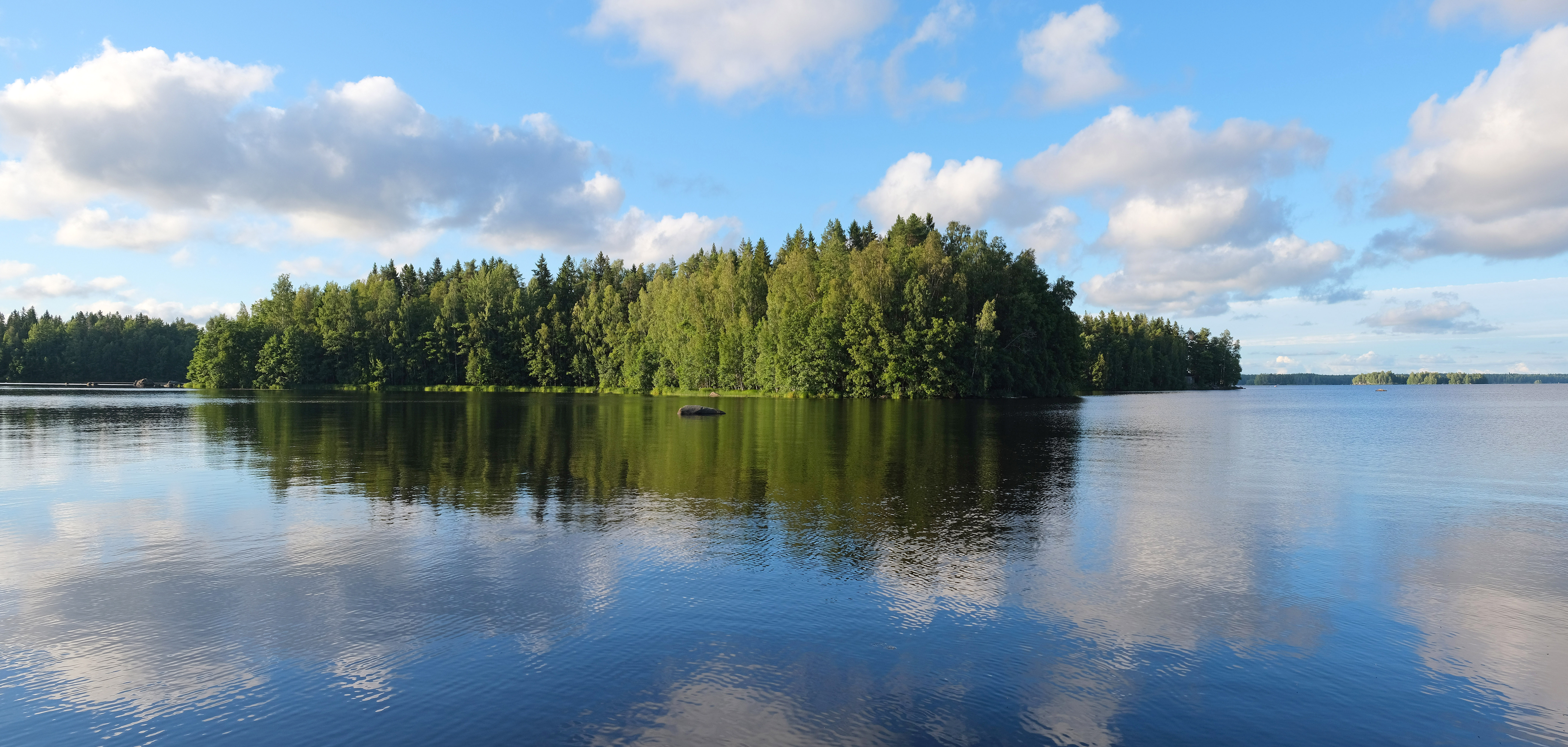
Summer view of Isojärvi, the 97th largest lake in Finland.

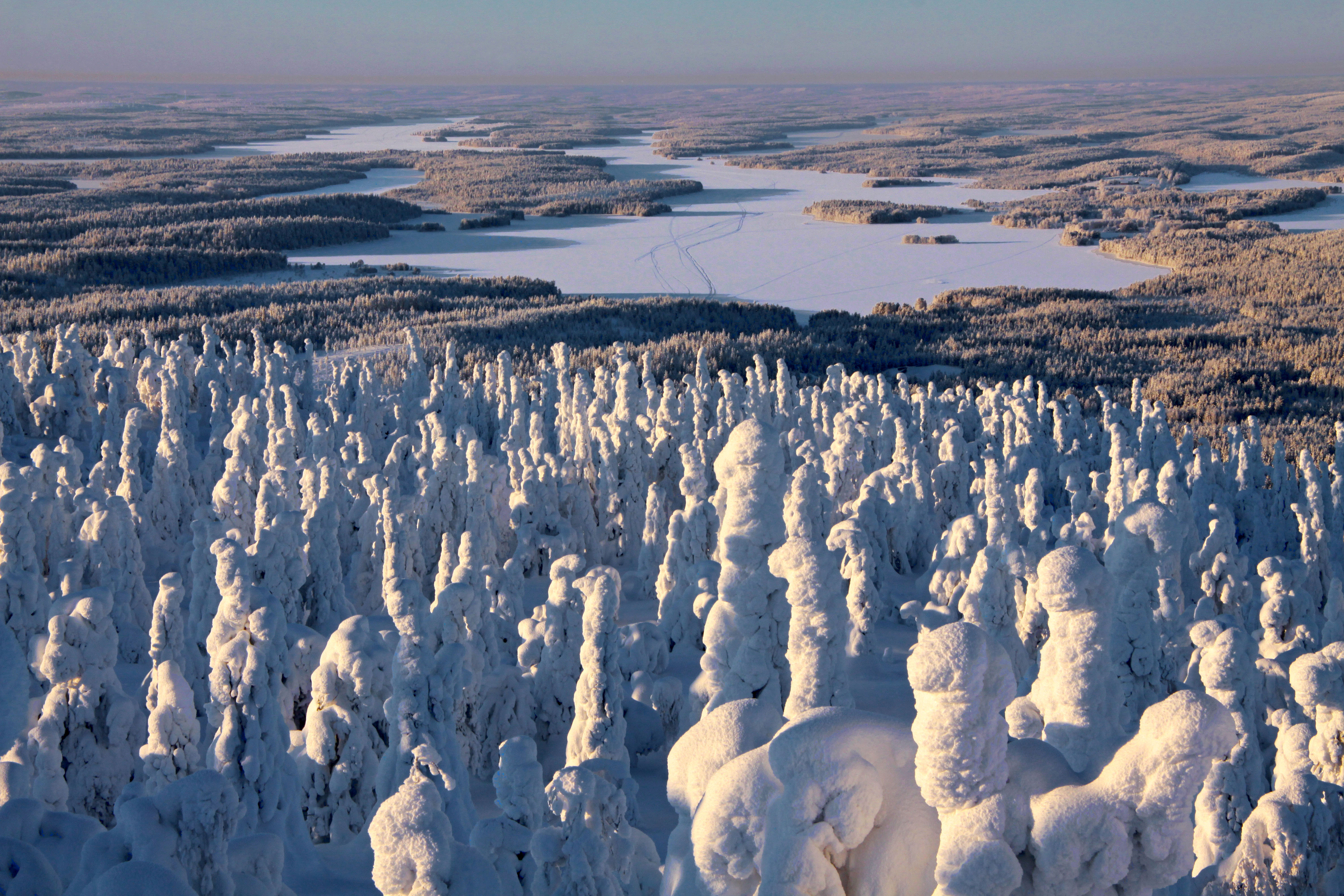
Winter view of Lake Iijärvi seen from Iivaara in Kuusamo, Finland

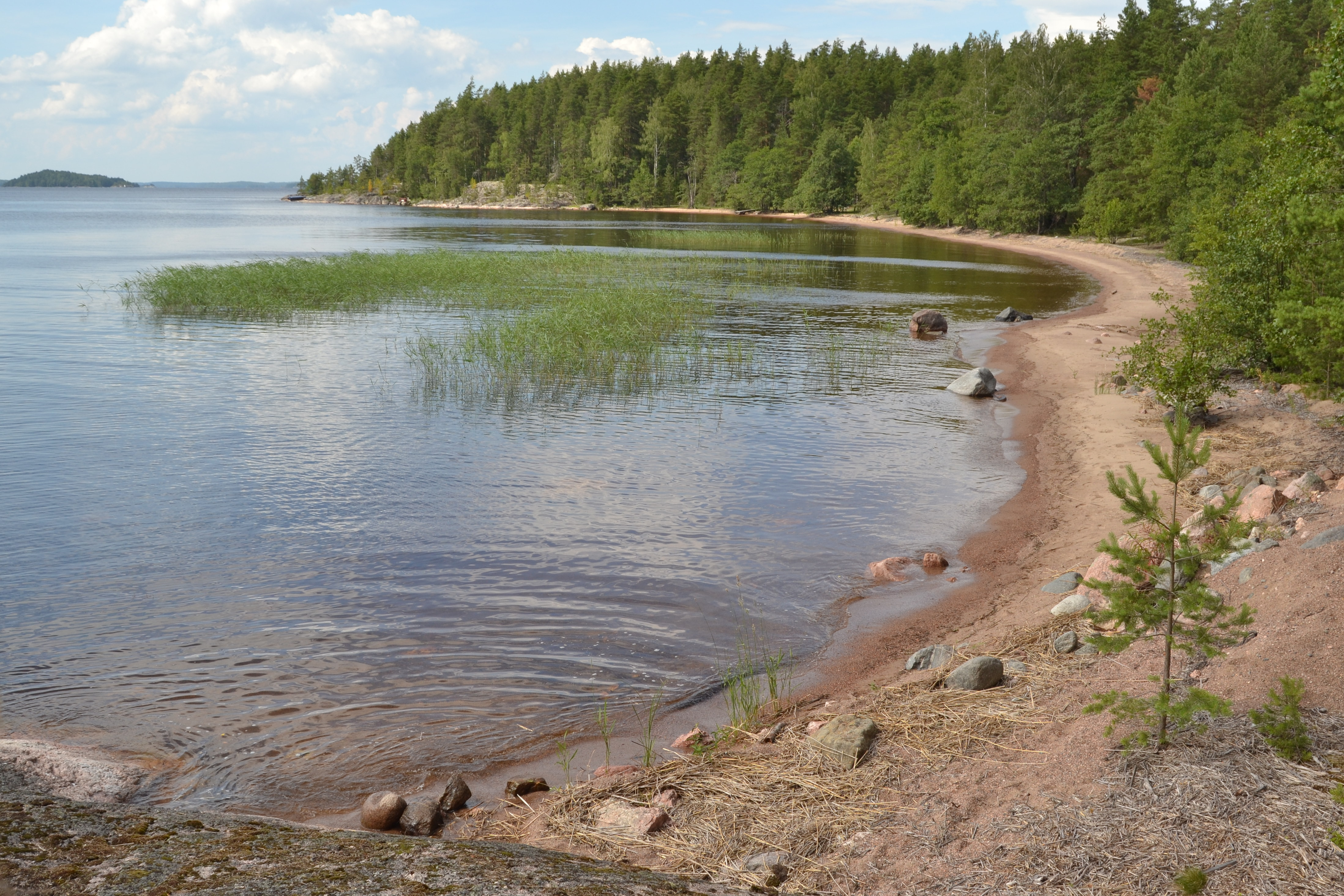
Lake Saimaa

Most lakes in Finland are small, but there are 309 lakes or reservoirs with a surface area larger than 10 km². There are about 5,600 lakes in Finland that are larger than 0.1 km² (10 hectares or 100,000 square metres), and 187,888 lakes larger than five ares (500 square metres / 5,382 sq.ft.). There is no standard unambiguous definition of the size requirements for a water body to be classified as a lake. Saimaa is the largest lake in Finland, and the fourth-largest natural freshwater lake in Europe.

They are listed here along with some smaller noteworthy lakes.

== Alphabetical listing ==
=== A ===
Aapajärvi, Ala-Kintaus, Ala-Kitka, Alvajärvi

=== B ===
Bodominjärvi

=== E ===
Elämäjärvi, Enäjärvi, Enijärvi, Enonvesi, Evijärvi

=== H ===
Haapajärvi, Hankavesi, Hankavesi – Lonkari, Hankavesi-Välivesi, Hauhonselkä, Haukivesi, Hiidenvesi, Hiirenvesi, Hirvijärvi Reservoir, Hirvijärvi – Kalliovesi, Höytiäinen, Hyrynjärvi

=== I ===
Iijärvi (1), Iijärvi (2), Iijärvi (3), Iijärvi (4), Iisvesi, Iivantiira – Juttuajärvi, Ilmoilanselkä, Immalanjärvi, Inari, Irnijärvi – Ala-Irni, Iso and Pieni Tipasjärvi, Iso Lamujärvi, Iso Lohijärvi, Iso- and Keski-Kero, Lake Ii, Iso-Kiimanen, Iso-Naakkima, Iso-Pyhäntä, Iso-Roine, Iso-Vietonen, Isojärvi (1), Isojärvi (2)

=== J ===
Jääsjärvi, Jämsänvesi–Petäjävesi, Jäsys – Retujärvi, Jerisjärvi, Jonkeri, Jonku, Jormasjärvi, Joukamojärvi, Joutjärvi, Joutsijärvi, Joutsjärvi, Juojärvi, Juolasvesi – Sarkavesi, Juurusvesi–Akonvesi, Jyväsjärvi

=== K ===
Kaavinjärvi, Kalajärvi Reservoir, Kallavesi (1), Kallavesi (2), Kangasjärvi, Kangasvesi, Kankareenjärvi, Kankarisvesi, Kannonselkä, Karankajärvi, Karhijärvi, Karijärvi, Karikkoselkä, Kaukajärvi, Kaukuanjärvi, Keitele, Kellojärvi – Korpijärvi, Kelontekemäjärvi, Kemijärvi, Kermajärvi, Keurusselkä, Kevatoinen, Keyritty, Kiantajärvi (1), Kiantajärvi (2), Kiesimä, Kiitämä, Kilpisjärvi – Alajärvi, Kiteenjärvi, Kiuruvesi, Kivesjärvi, Kivijärvi (1), Kivijärvi (2), Köhniönjärvi, Koitere, Koivujärvi, Kolima, Koljonselkä, Kolkonjärvi, Konnevesi, Konnivesi, Korpijärvi, Korpijärvi – Verijärvi, Korvuanjärvi, Koskelovesi – Miekkavesi, Koskikeskinen, Kostonjärvi, Koveroinen, Köyliönjärvi, Kukkia, Kulovesi, Kuohattijärvi, Kuohijärvi, Kuolimo, Kuorasjärvi, Kuorevesi, Kuorinka, Kuortaneenjärvi, Kurkijärvi – Tuuliainen, Kuttajärvi, Kuuhankavesi, Kuusamojärvi, Kuusvesi, Kuvansi, Kynsijärvi – Kynsilampi, Kynsivesi – Leivonvesi, Kyrösjärvi, Kyyjärvi, Kyyvesi

=== L ===
Lämsänjärvi, Laakajärvi, Lahnajärvi, Lahnavesi, Lammasjärvi, Lampaanjärvi, Längelmävesi, Lannevesi, Lapinjärvi, Lappajärvi, Lappalanjärvi, Lentiira, Lentua, Leppävesi, Lestijärvi, Liesvesi, Lievestuoreenjärvi, Livojärvi, Lohjanjärvi, Lokka Reservoir, Loppijärvi, Luirojärvi, Lummene, Luonetjärvi

=== M ===
Maaninkajärvi, Maavesi, Mahnalanselkä – Kirkkojärvi, Mallasvesi, Mallos, Melakko – Loitimo, Miekojärvi, Muojärvi – Kirpistö, Mutusjärvi, Muurasjärvi, Muuratjärvi, Muuruejärvi

=== N ===
Näläntöjärvi, Nammijärvi, Näsijärvi, Nerkoonjärvi (1), Nerkoonjärvi (2), Niemisvesi – Pemu, Niinivesi, Nilakka, Niskajärvi, Nitsijärvi, Nolimojärvi, Norvajärvi, Nuorajärvi, Nuoramoisjärvi

=== O ===
Oijärvi, Olkkajärvi – Matkalampi, Onkamojärvi, Onkivesi, Ontojärvi – Nurmesjärvi, Orajärvi, Orivesi, Osmankajärvi, Otermanjärvi, Oulujärvi

=== P ===
Pääjärvi (1), Pääjärvi (2), Paatari (Paadaar), Päijänne, Paljavesi, Pälkänevesi, Pallasjärvi – Pallaslompolo, Palokkajärvi, Palovesi – Jäminginselkä, Pankajärvi, Pautujärvi, Peruvesi, Pesiöjärvi, Petruma, Pieksänjärvi, Pielavesi, Pielinen, Pieni-Kiimanen, Pieni-Onkamo, Pihlajavesi (Saimaa), Pihlajavesi (Keuruu), Piispajärvi, Pirttijärvi – Kaitainjärvi, Pirttilampi, Pohjois- and Etelä-Virmas, Porovesi, Porttipahta Reservoir, Posionjärvi, Pöyrisjärvi, Pöyrysjärvi Puhosjärvi, Pulmankijärvi, Puruvesi, Puula, Pyhäjärvi (1), Pyhäjärvi (2), Pyhäjärvi (3), Pyhäjärvi (4), Pyhäjärvi (5), Pyhäjärvi (6), Pyhäjärvi (7), Pyhäjärvi (8), Pyhäjärvi (9), Pyhäselkä, Pyhävesi, Pyyvesi, Puujärvi

=== R ===
Raanujärvi, Rahajärvi (Raahajärvi), Ranuanjärvi, Rapojärvi – Haukkajärvi, Rauhajärvi, Rautavesi (1), Rautavesi (2), Rehja – Nuasjärvi, Repovesi – Luujärvi, Riistavesi, Rikkavesi, Roine, Ruotsalainen, Ruovesi, Rutajärvi (1), Rutajärvi (2), Ruunaanjärvi, Ryökäsvesi – Liekune

=== S ===
Sääksjärvi (1), Sääksjärvi (2), Saanijärvi, Saarijärvi (1), Saarijärvi (2), Saarijärvi (3), Saarijärvi (4), Saimaa, Sälevä, Sapsojärvet, Saraavesi, Särkijärvi, Savivesi, Sevettijärvi, Simojärvi, Simpelejärvi, Sonkari – Riitunlampi, Sorsavesi, Suininki, Summasjärvi, Suolijärvi (1), Suolijärvi (2), Suolisjärvi, Suontee, Suontienselkä – Paasvesi, Surnujärvi, Suuri-Onkamo, Suuri-Pieksä, Suurijärvi, Suvasvesi, Synsiä, Sysmä (1), Sysmä (2), Syvänsi, Syväjärvi 108, Syväri, Syysjärvi

=== T ===
Tallusjärvi, Tampaja, Tarjanne, Tohmajärvi, Toisvesi, Torsa – Pieni-Torsa, Tuomiojärvi, Tuusjärvi, Tuusulanjärvi, Tyräjärvi,

=== U ===
Ukonvesi, Uljua Reservoir, Ullavanjärvi, Unari, Unnukka, Urajärvi, Uurainen

=== V ===
Vaalajärvi, Vahvajärvi, Vajukoski basin, Vanajavesi, Vallonjärvi, Vanttausjärvi, Vaskivesi – Visuvesi, Vehkajärvi, Venetjoki Reservoir, Vesankajärvi, Vesijako, Vesijärvi (1), Vesijärvi (2), Viekijärvi, Viheri, Viiksinselkä, Viinijärvi, Virmajärvi (1), Virmajärvi (2), Vuohijärvi, Vuokalanjärvi, Vuokkijärvi, Vuontisjärvi, Vuosanganjärvi – Hyötyjärvi, Vuosjärvi, Vuotjärvi

=== Y ===
Ylä-Enonvesi, Ylä-Rieveli, Yli-Kitka, Yli-Suolijärvi

=== Ä ===
Ähtärinjärvi, Äkäsjärvi

== Ten largest lakes ==
| Rank | Name | Area (km^{2}) |
|---|---|---|
| 1 | Saimaa | 1,377.05 |
| 2 | Päijänne | 1,080.63 |
| 3 | Inari | 1,040.28 |
| 4 | Pielinen | 894.21 |
| 5 | Oulujärvi | 887.09 |
| 6 | Pihlajavesi | 712.59 |
| 7 | Orivesi | 601.30 |
| 8 | Haukivesi | 562.31 |
| 9 | Keitele | 493.59 |
| 10 | Kallavesi | 472.76 |

== See also ==
- Finnish Lakeland
