= Kolkonjärvi =

- Location within Finland
- Coordinates: 61.997°N 28.155°E
- Type: Lake
- Primary outflows: Kolkonjoki
- Catchment area: Vuoksi
- Basin countries: Finland
- Surface area: 20.921 km^{2} (8.078 sq mi)
- Shore length^{1}: 42.23 km (26.24 mi)
- Surface elevation: 98.2 m (322 ft)
- Frozen: December–April
- Settlements: Rantasalmi
- ^{1} Shore length is not a well-defined measure.

Kolkonjärvi is a medium-sized lake in the Vuoksi main catchment area. It is located in the region Southern Savonia of Finland.

In Finland there are 8 lakes that are called Kolkonjärvi. This is the biggest of them.

== See also ==
- List of lakes in Finland
