= Joutsijärvi =

Lake of Ulvila, Finland

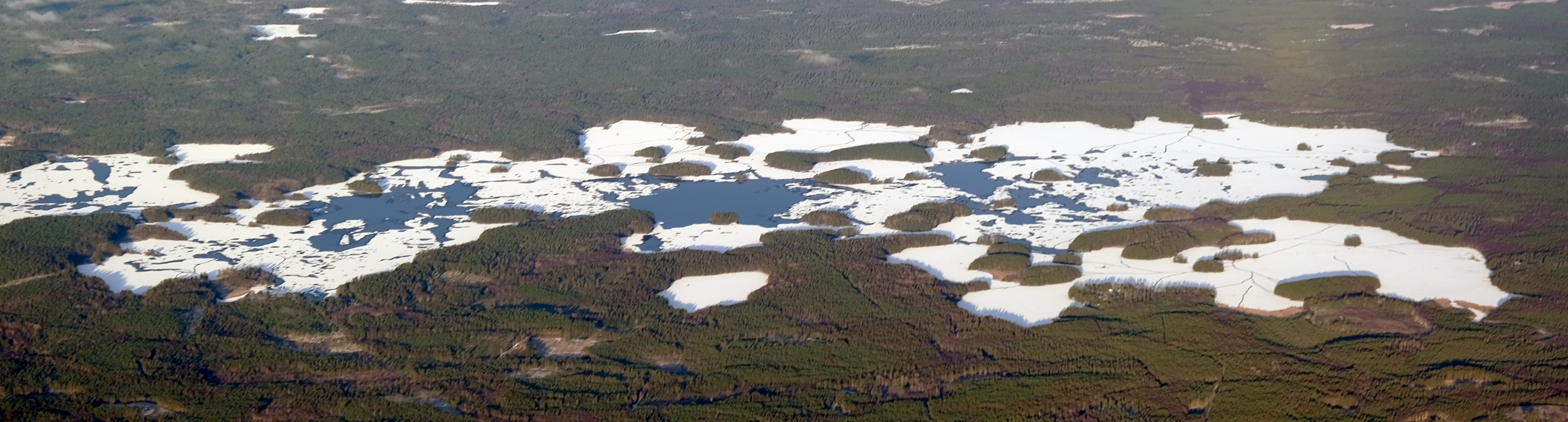
- Joutsijärvi lake, Ulvila, Finland

- Location within Finland
- Location: Ulvila
- Coordinates: 61°30′59″N 22°10′09″E
- Catchment area: Kokemäenjoki
- Basin countries: Finland
- Surface area: 10.388 km^{2} (4.011 sq mi)
- Average depth: 2.17 m (7 ft 1 in)
- Max. depth: 6.49 m (21.3 ft)
- Water volume: 0.0225 km^{3} (18,200 acre⋅ft)
- Shore length^{1}: 63.12 km (39.22 mi)
- Surface elevation: 44.5 m (146 ft)
- Frozen: December–April
- Islands: Iso-Nokee
- Settlements: Ulvila
- ^{1} Shore length is not a well-defined measure.

Joutsijärvi is a medium-sized lake in the Kokemäenjoki main catchment area. It is located in the region Satakunta in Finland.

== See also ==
- List of lakes in Finland
