= Pirttilampi =

Lake in Finland

- Location within Central Finland Location within Finland Location within Scandinavia Location within Europe
- Coordinates: 62°29′50″N 24°47′42″E
- Type: Lake
- Basin countries: Finland
- Average depth: 1.62 m (5 ft 4 in)
- Max. depth: 3 m (9.8 ft)
- Water volume: 0.000074 km^{3} (60 acre⋅ft)
- Islands: none

Pirttilampi is a medium-sized lake in Finland. It is located in Central Finland, to the north of Multia.

== See also ==
- List of lakes in Finland
