= Lake Unari =

- Location within Lapland
- Coordinates: 67°10′N 25°44′E
- Type: Lake
- Primary inflows: Moulusjoki, Uilingasjoki
- Primary outflows: Meltausjoki
- Catchment area: Kemijoki
- Basin countries: Finland
- Surface area: 28.808 km^{2} (11.123 sq mi)
- Shore length^{1}: 73.01 km (45.37 mi)
- Surface elevation: 179.8 m (590 ft)
- Islands: Porosaari, 3.21 km^{2}
- ^{1} Shore length is not a well-defined measure.

Lake Unari is a medium-sized lake in Finnish Lapland, in the municipality of Sodankylä. It belongs to Kemijoki main catchment area.

== See also ==
- List of lakes in Finland
