= Iso-Vietonen =

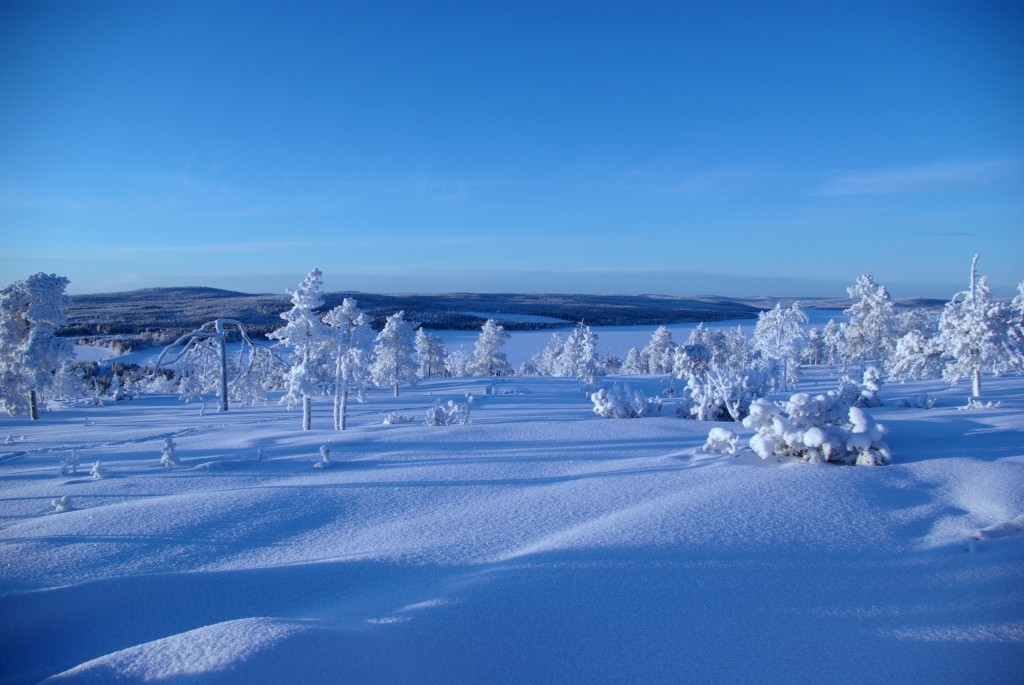

- Location within Lapland
- Location: Ylitornio
- Coordinates: 66°37′01″N 24°37′56″E
- Type: Lake
- Primary inflows: Jolmankoski
- Primary outflows: Kaaraneskoski
- Catchment area: Tornionjoki
- Basin countries: Finland
- Surface area: 35.377 km^{2} (13.659 sq mi)
- Average depth: 6.36 m (20.9 ft)
- Max. depth: 20.39 m (66.9 ft)
- Water volume: 0.225 km^{3} (182,000 acre⋅ft)
- Shore length^{1}: 51 km (32 mi)
- Surface elevation: 91.8 m (301 ft)
- Frozen: December–May
- Islands: Himotussaari, koivusaari
- ^{1} Shore length is not a well-defined measure.

Iso-Vietonen is a medium-sized lake in the Tornionjoki main catchment area. It is located in Ylitornio municipality, in the Lapland region in Finland.

== See also ==
- List of lakes in Finland
