= Kalajärvi Reservoir =

- Location within Finland
- Coordinates: 62°33′37″N 023°07′59″E
- Type: Reservoir
- Catchment area: Kyrönjoki
- Basin countries: Finland
- Built: 1977
- Surface area: 11.038 km^{2} (4.262 sq mi)
- Shore length^{1}: 43.36 km (26.94 mi)
- Surface elevation: 105.5 m (346 ft)
- Settlements: Seinäjoki
- ^{1} Shore length is not a well-defined measure.

Kalajärvi Reservoir (Finnish: Kalajärven tekojärvi) is a medium-sized lake of Finland. It is located in the city of Seinäjoki in South Ostrobothnia. The reservoir was built on the site of a smaller lake, and finished in 1977.

== See also ==
- List of lakes in Finland
