= Lannevesi =

- Location within Finland
- Coordinates: 62°34′N 25°27′E
- Type: Lake
- Primary outflows: Lannejoki
- Catchment area: Kymijoki
- Basin countries: Finland
- Surface area: 11.016 km^{2} (4.253 sq mi)
- Average depth: 6.27 m (20.6 ft)
- Max. depth: 27 m (89 ft)
- Water volume: 0.0685 km^{3} (55,500 acre⋅ft)
- Shore length^{1}: 35.29 km (21.93 mi)
- Surface elevation: 111.3 m (365 ft)
- Frozen: November–April
- Islands: Karankasaari, Hirvisaari, Mankkisaari
- ^{1} Shore length is not a well-defined measure.

Lannevesi is a medium-sized lake of Central Finland in the Kymijoki main catchment area. It is situated in Saarijärvi municipality. Lannevesi flows its water to the north, Summasjärvi by Lannejoki River.

Near the lake there is Lannevesi village.

== See also ==
- List of lakes in Finland
