= Keyritty =

Lake in Northern Savonia region, Finland

- Location within Finland
- Coordinates: 63°27′N 28°18′E
- Catchment area: Vuoksi
- Basin countries: Finland
- Surface area: 18.292 km^{2} (7.063 sq mi)
- Average depth: 4.29 m (14.1 ft)
- Max. depth: 30.8 m (101 ft)
- Water volume: 0.0785 km^{3} (63,600 acre⋅ft)
- Shore length^{1}: 74.97 km (46.58 mi)
- Surface elevation: 120.1 m (394 ft)
- Frozen: December–April
- Islands: Tulisaari, Honkasaari
- Settlements: Rautavaara
- ^{1} Shore length is not a well-defined measure.

Keyritty is a medium-sized lake in the Vuoksi main catchment area. It is located in the region of Northern Savonia in Finland.

== See also ==
- List of lakes in Finland
