= Tyräjärvi =

Lake in Finland

- Location within Finland
- Coordinates: 65°28′N 28°42′E
- Type: Lake
- Primary inflows: Hutunsalmi strait, lake Koviojärvi
- Primary outflows: river Tyräjoki
- Catchment area: Iijoki
- Basin countries: Finland
- Surface area: 23.868 km^{2} (9.215 sq mi)
- Average depth: 4.02 m (13.2 ft)
- Max. depth: 15.64 m (51.3 ft)
- Water volume: 0.096 km^{3} (78,000 acre⋅ft)
- Shore length^{1}: 64.5 km (40.1 mi)
- Surface elevation: 223.8 m (734 ft)
- Frozen: December–April
- Settlements: Taivalkoski
- ^{1} Shore length is not a well-defined measure.

Tyräjärvi is a medium-sized lake in the Iijoki main catchment area. It is located in the region Northern Ostrobothnia. In Finland there are three lakes with the name Tyräjärvi, of which this one is the largest.

== See also ==
- List of lakes in Finland
