= Kelontekemäjärvi =

Lake in Kittilä, Finland

- Location within Lapland
- Location: Kittilä
- Coordinates: 67°31′N 25°33′E
- Primary inflows: Kievanaoja
- Primary outflows: river Kelontekemäjoki to the river Jeesiöjoki
- Catchment area: Kemijoki
- Basin countries: Finland
- Surface area: 16.432 km^{2} (6.344 sq mi)
- Average depth: 2.7 m (8 ft 10 in)
- Max. depth: 5.1 m (17 ft)
- Water volume: 0.0444 km^{3} (36,000 acre⋅ft)
- Shore length^{1}: 26.21 km (16.29 mi)
- Surface elevation: 197.5 m (648 ft)
- ^{1} Shore length is not a well-defined measure.

Kelontekemäjärvi is a medium-sized lake in the Kemijoki main catchment area. It is located in Kittilä municipality in the region Lapland in Finland. Historically the lake has been a border mark between the Sami villages of Kittilä and Sodankylä.

== See also ==
- List of lakes in Finland
