= Karijärvi =

Lake in the country of Finland

- Location within Finland
- Coordinates: 61.1523°N 26.41952°E
- Primary outflows: Myllyjoki
- Catchment area: Kymijoki
- Basin countries: Finland
- Surface area: 20.558 km^{2} (7.937 sq mi)
- Average depth: 9.26 m (30.4 ft)
- Max. depth: 33 m (108 ft)
- Water volume: 0.19 km^{3} (150,000 acre⋅ft)
- Shore length^{1}: 71.79 km (44.61 mi)
- Surface elevation: 77.3 m (254 ft)
- Frozen: December–April
- Islands: Lammassaari, Herransaari
- Settlements: Jaala
- ^{1} Shore length is not a well-defined measure.

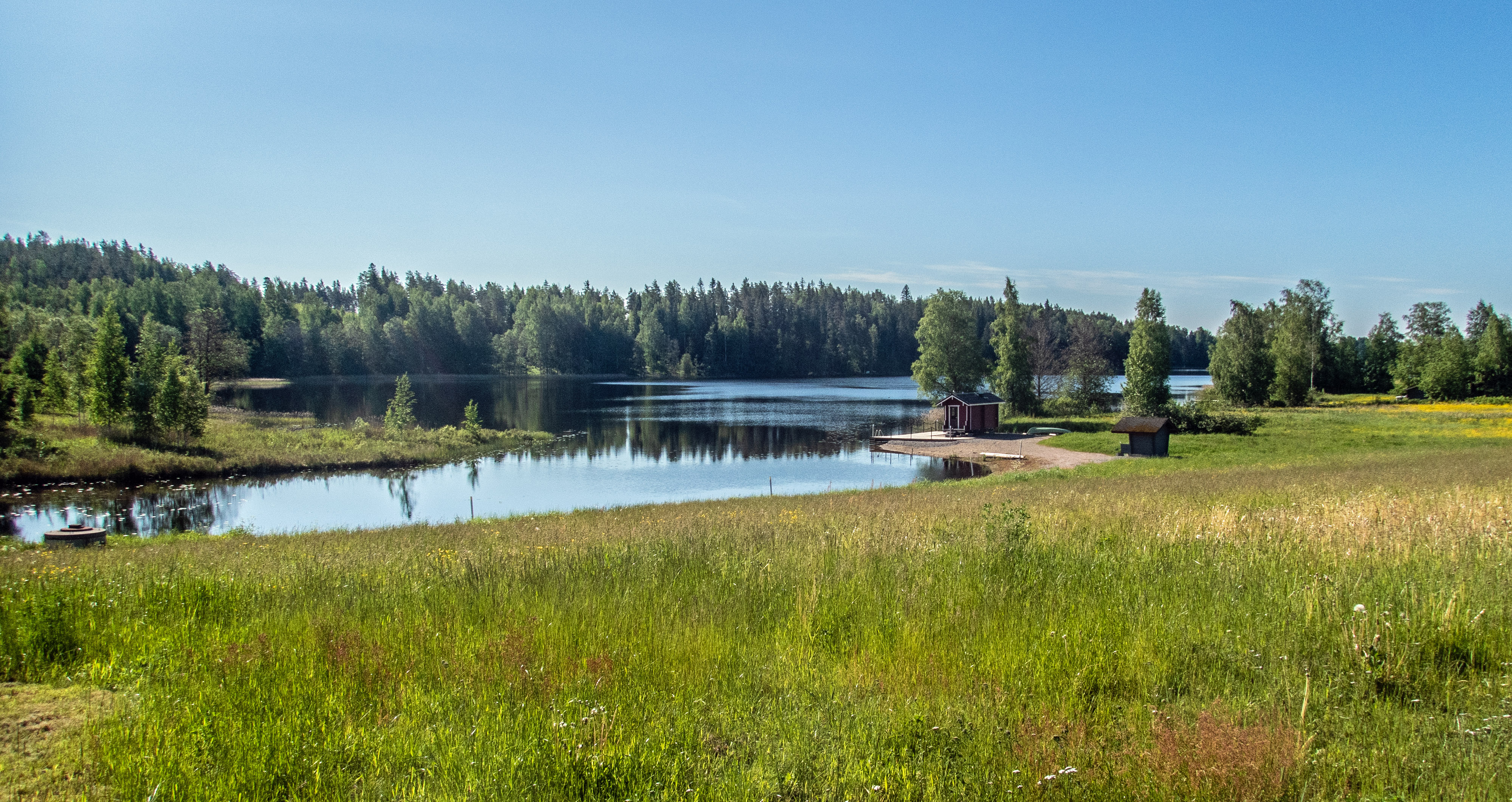

Karijärvi is a medium-sized lake of Finland in the Kymijoki main catchment area. It is located in the municipality of Kouvola, in region of Kymenlaakso. In the north-eastern shore of the lake there is an area of Uutelanvuori rock paintings.

== See also ==
- List of lakes in Finland
