= Raanujärvi =

Lake in Finland

- Location within Lapland
- Location: Ylitornio
- Coordinates: 66°41′N 24°42′E
- Type: Lake
- Catchment area: Tornionjoki
- Basin countries: Finland
- Surface area: 25.431 km^{2} (9.819 sq mi)
- Average depth: 6.26 m (20.5 ft)
- Max. depth: 25.93 m (85.1 ft)
- Water volume: 0.16 km^{3} (130,000 acre⋅ft)
- Shore length^{1}: 49.1 km (30.5 mi)
- Surface elevation: 96.3 m (316 ft)
- Frozen: December–May
- Islands: Raanusaari
- ^{1} Shore length is not a well-defined measure.

Raanujärvi is a medium-sized lake in the Tornionjoki main catchment area. It is located in the region Lapland in Finland.

== See also ==
- List of lakes in Finland
