= Lampaanjärvi =

- Location within Finland
- Location: Pielavesi
- Coordinates: 63°23′N 26°56′E
- Type: Lake
- Catchment area: Kymijoki
- Basin countries: Finland
- Surface area: 15.49 km^{2} (5.98 sq mi)
- Average depth: 3.13 m (10.3 ft)
- Max. depth: 15 m (49 ft)
- Water volume: 0.0485 km^{3} (39,300 acre⋅ft)
- Shore length^{1}: 82.31 km (51.15 mi)
- Surface elevation: 128.3 m (421 ft)
- Frozen: December–April
- Islands: Hiidensaari, Sipolansaari
- ^{1} Shore length is not a well-defined measure.

Lampaanjärvi is a medium-sized lake in the Kymijoki main catchment area. It is located in the North Savo region in Finland.

== See also ==
- List of lakes in Finland
