= Pankajärvi =

Lake in Finland

- Location within Finland
- Location: Lieksa, North Karelia, Finland
- Coordinates: 63°21.5′N 30°13.5′E
- Primary inflows: Yläjoki
- Primary outflows: Pudasjoki
- Catchment area: Vuoksi
- Basin countries: Finland
- Surface area: 23.755 km^{2} (9.172 sq mi)
- Average depth: 3.8 m (12 ft)
- Max. depth: 17.55 m (57.6 ft)
- Water volume: 0.0904 km^{3} (73,300 acre⋅ft)
- Shore length^{1}: 121.14 km (75.27 mi)
- Surface elevation: 115.2 m (378 ft)
- Frozen: December–April
- Islands: Kääntämö, Suokkolansaari
- Settlements: Lieksa
- ^{1} Shore length is not a well-defined measure.

Pankajärvi is a medium-sized lake in the Vuoksi main catchment area. It is located in the North Karelia region, in the municipality of Lieksa in Finland.

== See also ==
- List of lakes in Finland
