= Kuorasjärvi =

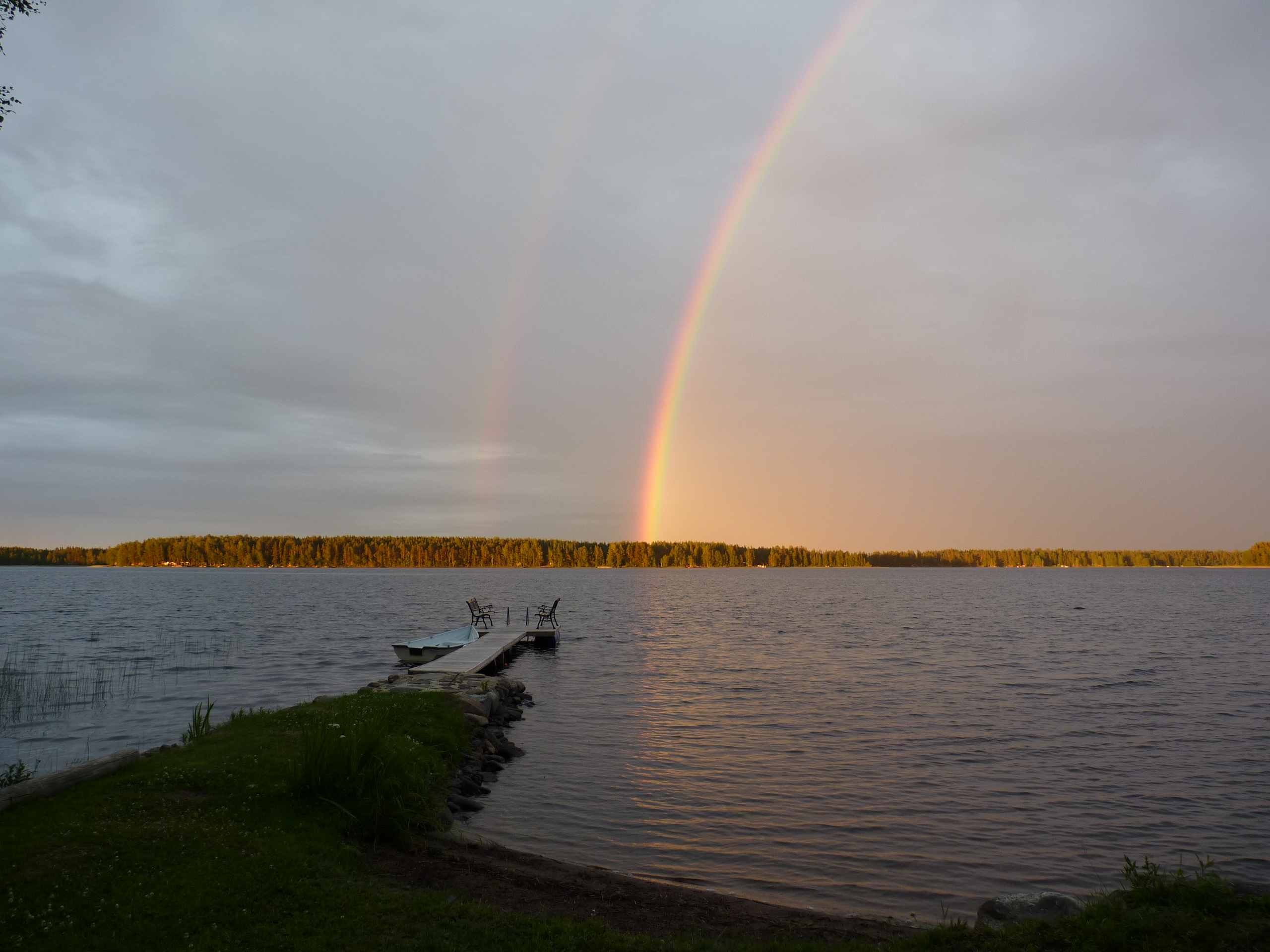
- Lake Kuorasjärvi in Alavus, Finland.

- Location within Finland
- Location: Alavus
- Coordinates: 62°41′N 23°15′E
- Type: Lake
- Catchment area: Lapuanjoki
- Basin countries: Finland
- Surface area: 12.284 km^{2} (4.743 sq mi)
- Average depth: 1.53 m (5 ft 0 in)
- Max. depth: 6.38 m (20.9 ft)
- Water volume: 0.0188 km^{3} (15,200 acre⋅ft)
- Shore length^{1}: 50.96 km (31.67 mi)
- Surface elevation: 106 m (348 ft)
- Frozen: December–April
- Islands: Etelä-Majasaari
- ^{1} Shore length is not a well-defined measure.

Kuorasjärvi is medium-sized lake in the Lapuanjoki main catchment area. It is located in the region South Ostrobothnia, in the municipality of Alavus, Finland.

== See also ==
- List of lakes in Finland
