= Korpijärvi =

- Location within Finland
- Coordinates: 61.249°N 27.104°E
- Type: Lake
- Catchment area: Vuoksi
- Basin countries: Finland
- Surface area: 31.219 km^{2} (12.054 sq mi)
- Average depth: 10.04 m (32.9 ft)
- Max. depth: 41.27 m (135.4 ft)
- Water volume: 0.313 km^{3} (254,000 acre⋅ft)
- Shore length^{1}: 101.06 km (62.80 mi)
- Surface elevation: 82.3 m (270 ft)
- Frozen: December–April
- Islands: Korpisaari, Ilkonsaari
- Settlements: Mäntyharju
- ^{1} Shore length is not a well-defined measure.

Korpijärvi is a medium-sized lake in the Vuoksi main catchment area. It is located in the region Southern Savonia of Finland.

Korpijärvi is divided in two parts, which are called Valtolanselkä and Halmeniemenselkä. Between them is Tommolansalmi strait, and the Finnish National Road 15 crosses the lake there.

In Finland there are 40 lakes that are called Korpijärvi. This is the biggest of them.

== See also ==
- List of lakes in Finland
