= Jonku =

- Location within Finland
- Coordinates: 65°17′30″N 27°16′00″E
- Type: Lake
- Catchment area: Iijoki
- Basin countries: Finland
- Surface area: 25.261 km^{2} (9.753 sq mi)
- Average depth: 1.31 m (4 ft 4 in)
- Max. depth: 3.8 m (12 ft)
- Water volume: 0.033 km^{3} (27,000 acre⋅ft)
- Shore length^{1}: 73.07 km (45.40 mi)
- Surface elevation: 118.9 m (390 ft)
- Settlements: Jonku
- ^{1} Shore length is not a well-defined measure.

Jonku is a medium-sized lake in the Iijoki main catchment area. It is located in Pudasjärvi municipality, in the region of Northern Ostrobothnia in Finland. Jonku is also a village in the Pudasjärvi municipality.

== See also ==
- List of lakes in Finland
