= Hankavesi =

Lake in Hankasalmi, Finland

- Location within Finland
- Location: Jyväskylä, Central Finland
- Coordinates: 62°25.5′N 26°27′E
- Basin countries: Finland
- Surface area: 7.87 km^{2} (3.04 sq mi)

Hankavesi is a lake in Hankasalmi, Central Finland, Finland. The lake is middle sized and quite low; the form is like a labyrinth, with many islands and spits. Oksalansaari is one of its islands. The lake gets its water from Armisvesi lake.

== See also ==
- List of lakes in Finland
