= Kaukuanjärvi =

Lake in Posio, Finland

- Location within Lapland
- Location: Posio
- Coordinates: 65°56′N 28°18′E
- Catchment area: Iijoki
- Basin countries: Finland
- Surface area: 13.02 km^{2} (5.03 sq mi)
- Average depth: 2.62 m (8 ft 7 in)
- Max. depth: 14 m (46 ft)
- Water volume: 0.0344 km^{3} (27,900 acre⋅ft)
- Shore length^{1}: 33.47 km (20.80 mi)
- Surface elevation: 223.4 m (733 ft)
- Frozen: November–May
- ^{1} Shore length is not a well-defined measure.

Kaukuanjärvi is a medium-sized lake in the Iijoki main catchment area. It is located in Posio municipality, in the Lapland region in Finland.

== See also ==
- List of lakes in Finland
