= Vuokalanjärvi =

Lake in Finland

- Location within Finland
- Location: Savonlinna
- Coordinates: 62.235°N 29.151°E
- Catchment area: Vuoksi
- Basin countries: Finland
- Surface area: 17.605 km^{2} (6.797 sq mi)
- Shore length^{1}: 145.07 km (90.14 mi)
- Surface elevation: 90.4 m (297 ft)
- Frozen: December–April
- Islands: Vuokalansaari, Risusaari, Mustasaari
- Settlements: Savonranta
- ^{1} Shore length is not a well-defined measure.

Vuokalanjärvi is a medium-sized lake in the Vuoksi main catchment area. It is located in the region Southern Savonia and the municipality of Savonlinna.

== See also ==
- List of lakes in Finland
