= Paljavesi =

Lake in Finland

- Location within Finland
- Coordinates: 61°33.5′N 27°29.5′E
- Type: Lake
- Primary inflows: via Parkkilankoski from the lake Keskimmäinen
- Primary outflows: via Outulanvirta strait to the small lake Niinivesi
- Catchment area: Vuoksi
- Basin countries: Finland
- Surface area: 10.603 km^{2} (4.094 sq mi)
- Average depth: 6.89 m (22.6 ft)
- Max. depth: 36.65 m (120.2 ft)
- Water volume: 0.0729 km^{3} (59,100 acre⋅ft)
- Shore length^{1}: 77.91 km (48.41 mi)
- Surface elevation: 75.7 m (248 ft)
- Frozen: December–April
- Islands: Paljasaari
- ^{1} Shore length is not a well-defined measure.

Paljavesi is a medium-sized lake in Finland. It is located in the Southern Savonia region in Finland, in the municipality of Mikkeli. The lake belongs to the Vuoksi main catchment area.

== See also ==
- List of lakes in Finland
