= Osmankajärvi =

Lake in Puolanka, Finland

- Location within Finland
- Coordinates: 64°32′N 27°33′E
- Basin countries: Finland
- Surface area: 11.485 km^{2} (4.434 sq mi)
- Average depth: 2.44 m (8 ft 0 in)
- Max. depth: 11 m (36 ft)
- Water volume: 0.0281 km^{3} (22,800 acre⋅ft)
- Shore length^{1}: 24.49 km (15.22 mi)
- Surface elevation: 167.3 m (549 ft)
- Frozen: November–May
- Islands: none
- Settlements: Paltamo
- ^{1} Shore length is not a well-defined measure.

Osmankajärvi is a medium-sized lake in the Oulujoki main catchment area. It is located in the region Kainuu in Finland.

== See also ==
- List of lakes in Finland
