= Petruma =

Lake in Finland

- Location within Finland
- Location: Heinävesi
- Coordinates: 62.498°N 28.814°E
- Catchment area: Vuoksi
- Basin countries: Finland
- Surface area: 11.024 km^{2} (4.256 sq mi)
- Shore length^{1}: 44.64 km (27.74 mi)
- Surface elevation: 89.4 m (293 ft)
- Frozen: December–April
- ^{1} Shore length is not a well-defined measure.

Petruma is a medium-sized lake in the Vuoksi main catchment area. It is located in the region of North Karelia in Finland. Petruma is also the name of a nearby village in the municipality of Heinävesi.

== See also ==
- List of lakes in Finland
