= Lake Kiuruvesi =

Lake in Kiuruvesi, Finland

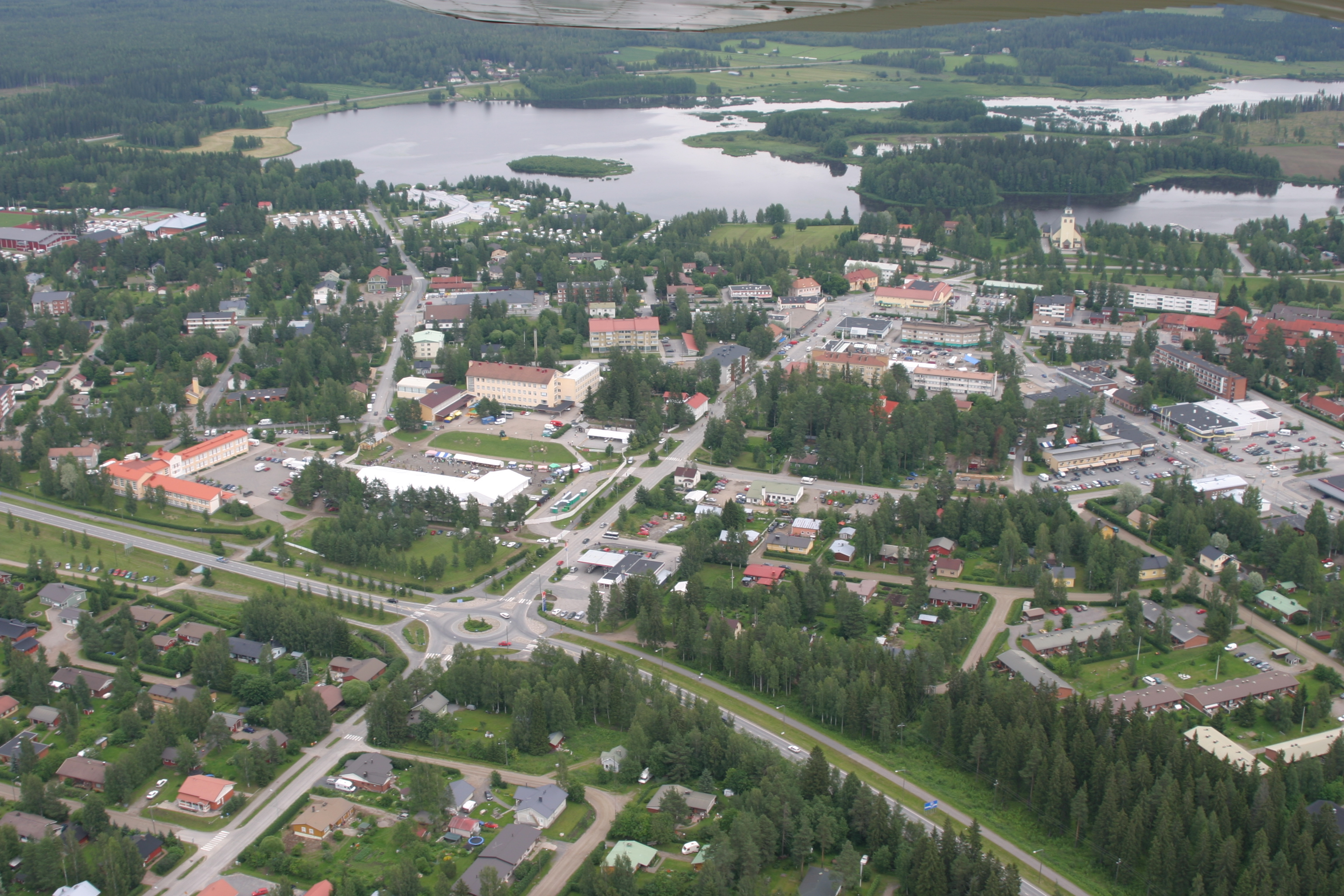
- An aerial view of Lake Kiuruvesi

- Location within Finland
- Coordinates: 63.6221°N 26.717°E
- Primary outflows: Ryönänjoki
- Catchment area: Vuoksi
- Basin countries: Finland
- Surface area: 14.316 km^{2} (5.527 sq mi)
- Average depth: 1.4 m (4 ft 7 in)
- Water volume: 0.0201 km^{3} (16,300 acre⋅ft)
- Shore length^{1}: 65.44 km (40.66 mi)
- Surface elevation: 88.4 m (290 ft)
- Frozen: December–April
- Islands: Syväinsaari
- Settlements: Kiuruvesi
- ^{1} Shore length is not a well-defined measure.

Lake Kiuruvesi is a medium-sized lake in the Vuoksi main catchment area. It is located in the North Savo region in Finland. The lake is very shallow.

== See also ==
- List of lakes in Finland
