= Puhosjärvi =

Lake in North Ostrobothnia, Finland

- Location within Finland
- Coordinates: 65°19′N 27°55′E
- Catchment area: Iijoki
- Basin countries: Finland
- Surface area: 23.685 km (14.717 mi)
- Average depth: 2.99 m (9 ft 10 in)
- Max. depth: 11.5 m (38 ft)
- Water volume: 0.707 km^{3} (573,000 acre⋅ft)
- Shore length^{1}: 59.18 km (36.77 mi)
- Surface elevation: 176.4 m (579 ft)
- Frozen: November–May
- Settlements: Pudasjärvi
- ^{1} Shore length is not a well-defined measure.

Puhosjärvi is a medium-sized lake in the Iijoki main catchment area. It is located in Pudasjärvi municipality, in the region of Northern Ostrobothnia in Finland.

== See also ==
- List of lakes in Finland
