= Viiksinselkä =

Lake in Finland and Russia

- Interactive map of Viiksinselkä
- Coordinates: 62°29′N 31°09′E
- Primary inflows: Tolvajoki, Volgajoki
- Primary outflows: Niemenjoki
- Catchment area: Vuoksi
- Basin countries: Finland, Russia
- Surface area: 37.008 km^{2} (14.289 sq mi)
- Shore length^{1}: 173.44 km (107.77 mi)
- Surface elevation: 145.4 m (477 ft)
- Frozen: December–April
- Islands: Ostronsaari, Tervansaari
- Settlements: Ilomantsi, Loimola
- ^{1} Shore length is not a well-defined measure.

Viiksinselkä (Russian: Виксинселькя, romanized: Viksinselkya) is a medium-sized lake in the Vuoksi main catchment area. It is located partly in the municipality of Ilomantsi in Finland and partly in Loimola municipality in Russia.

Viiksinselkä has an area of 37 square kilometers (14 sq mi), of which 16.39 km^{2} (6.33 sq mi) belongs to Finland and 20.62 km^{2} (7.96 sq mi) to Russia. Its surface elevation is 145.4 metres (477 ft) above sea level. The biggest island is Ostronsaari on the Finnish side, on which a village by the same name is located. The villages of Mutalahti and Nehvonniemi are also located by the lake.

== See also ==
- List of lakes in Finland
