= Enijärvi =

Lake in Kemijärvi, Finland

- Location within Lapland
- Coordinates: 66°51′N 26°47′E
- Basin countries: Finland

Enijärvi is a lake of Finland. It is located near the town of Kemijärvi in the Lapland region in northern Finland. The lake is part of Kemijoki basin.

== See also ==
- List of lakes in Finland
