= Jormasjärvi =

Lake in Sotkamo, Finland

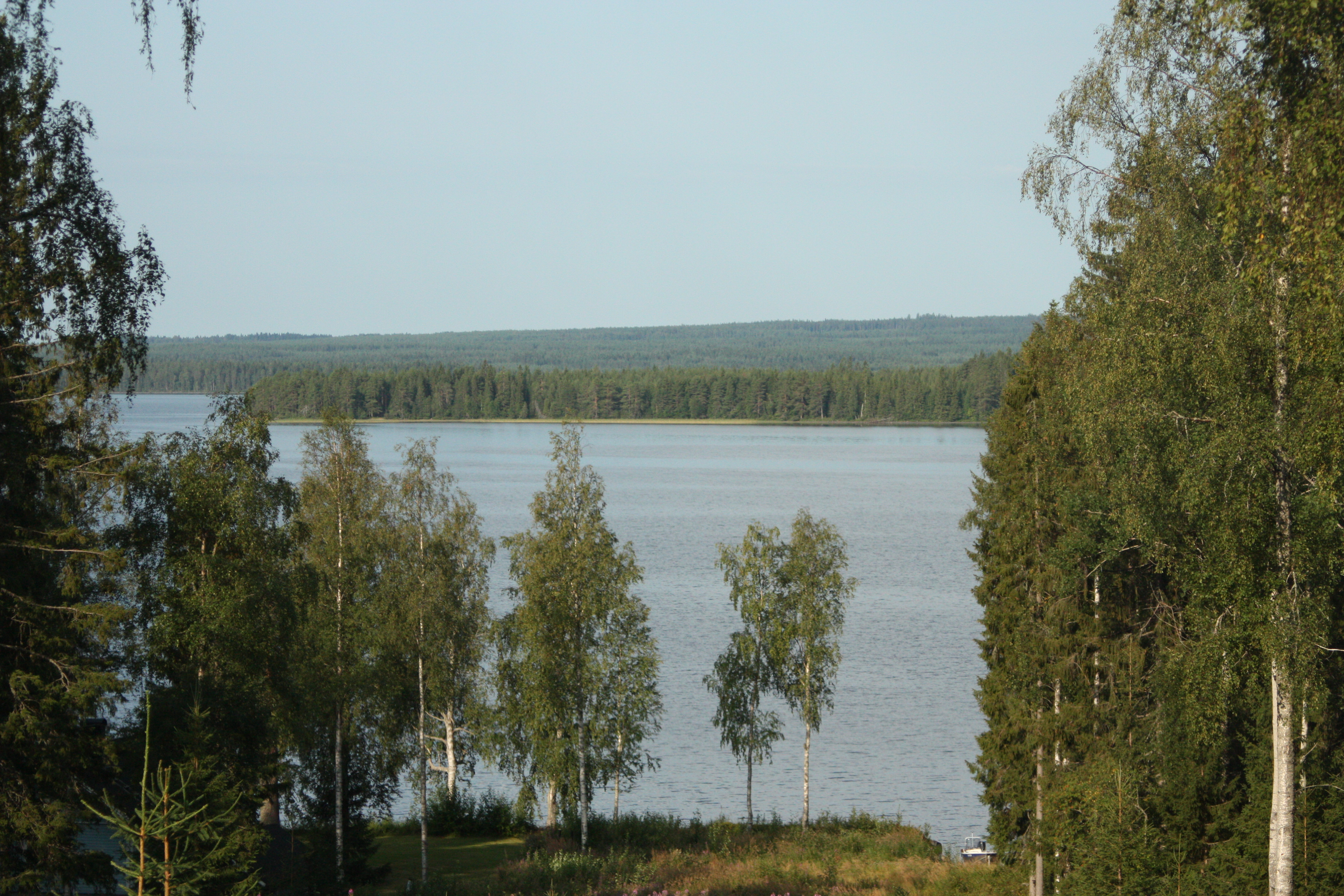

- Location within Finland
- Coordinates: 64°03′N 28°09′E
- Catchment area: Oulujoki
- Basin countries: Finland
- Max. length: 9 km (5.6 mi)
- Max. width: 4.5 km (2.8 mi)
- Surface area: 20.5 km^{2} (7.9 sq mi)
- Average depth: 5.8 m (19 ft)
- Max. depth: 28 m (92 ft)

Jormasjärvi is a lake in Sotkamo, eastern Finland. It is part of the Oulujoki basin, which drains west to the Bothnian Bay.

The area of the lake is 20.5 km^{2}, and maximum depth 28 m.

== See also ==
- List of lakes in Finland
