= Lämsänjärvi =

Small lake in Oulu, Finland

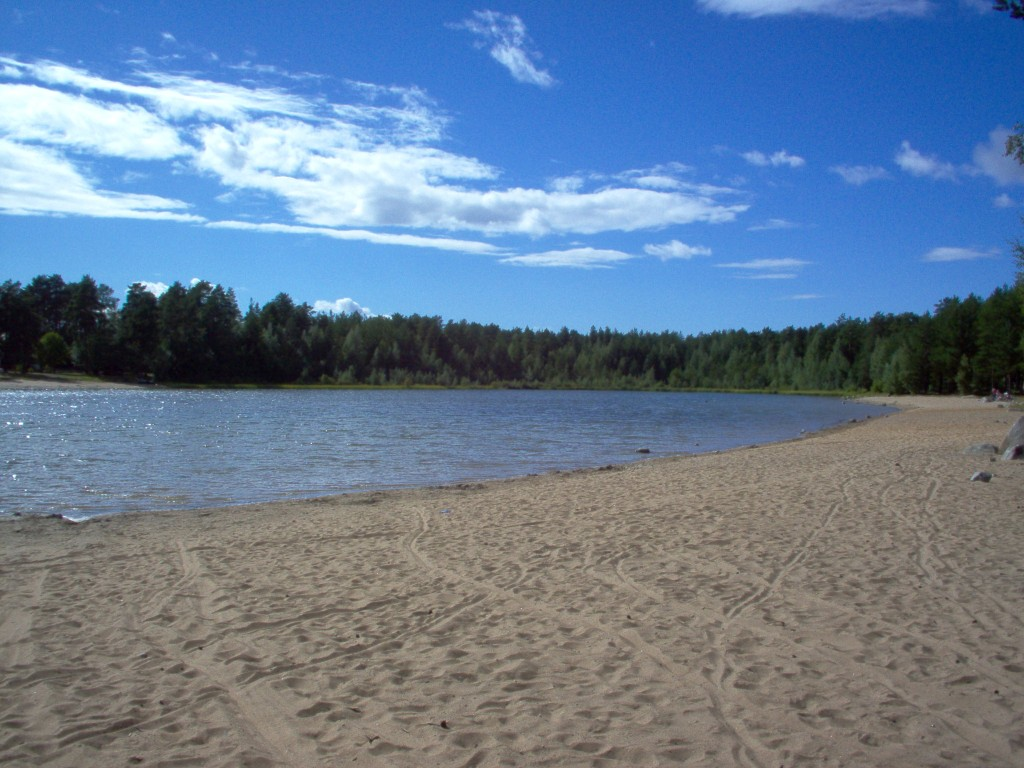
- Lämsänjärvi in July 2006

- Location within Finland
- Location: Oulunsuu, Oulu, Finland
- Coordinates: 64°59′46″N 25°32′46″E
- Type: Small lake
- Surface area: 0.0293 km^{2} (0.0113 sq mi)
- Average depth: 0.5 m (1 ft 8 in)
- Shore length^{1}: 0.7 km (0.43 mi)
- Surface elevation: 18.5 m (61 ft)
- ^{1} Shore length is not a well-defined measure.

Lämsänjärvi is a small lake located in the district of Oulunsuu in Oulu, Finland. There is a public beach on the northeast side of the lake which is maintained by the city and a church operated camp building on the west side which was built in 1936. The lake used to be very shallow overgrown swamp water but it was dredged in the early 1980s and converted in to its current form. Pedestrian and bicycle paths go around the lake as well as skiing and snowmobile trails in the winter. In 2014 the beach was closed after an outbreak of diarrhea and vomiting amongst the swimmers and samples of the water were confirmed to have contained norovirus and adenoviridae which tend to spread easily in smaller bodies of water. The water quality is monitored closely and tested every year before the swimming season begins.

== See also ==
- List of lakes of Finland
