= Kiitämä =

Lake in Kuusamo, Finland

- Location within Finland
- Location: Kuusamo, North Ostrobothnia, Finland
- Coordinates: 65°59.5′N 29°43′E
- Catchment area: Koutajoki
- Basin countries: Finland
- Surface area: 18.895 km^{2} (7.295 sq mi)
- Average depth: 6.69 m (21.9 ft)
- Max. depth: 21.71 m (71.2 ft)
- Water volume: 0.126 km^{3} (102,000 acre⋅ft)
- Shore length^{1}: 58.42 km (36.30 mi)
- Surface elevation: 252.8 m (829 ft)
- Frozen: December–May
- Islands: Sonnisaari
- ^{1} Shore length is not a well-defined measure.

Kiitämä is a large lake in the Koutajoki (73) main catchment area. It is located in the Pohjois-Pohjanmaan maakunta region. It falls under the environmental responsibility area of the Pohjois-Pohjanmaan ELY Centre.

== See also ==
- List of lakes in Finland
