= Kuortaneenjärvi =

Lake in Kuortane, Finland

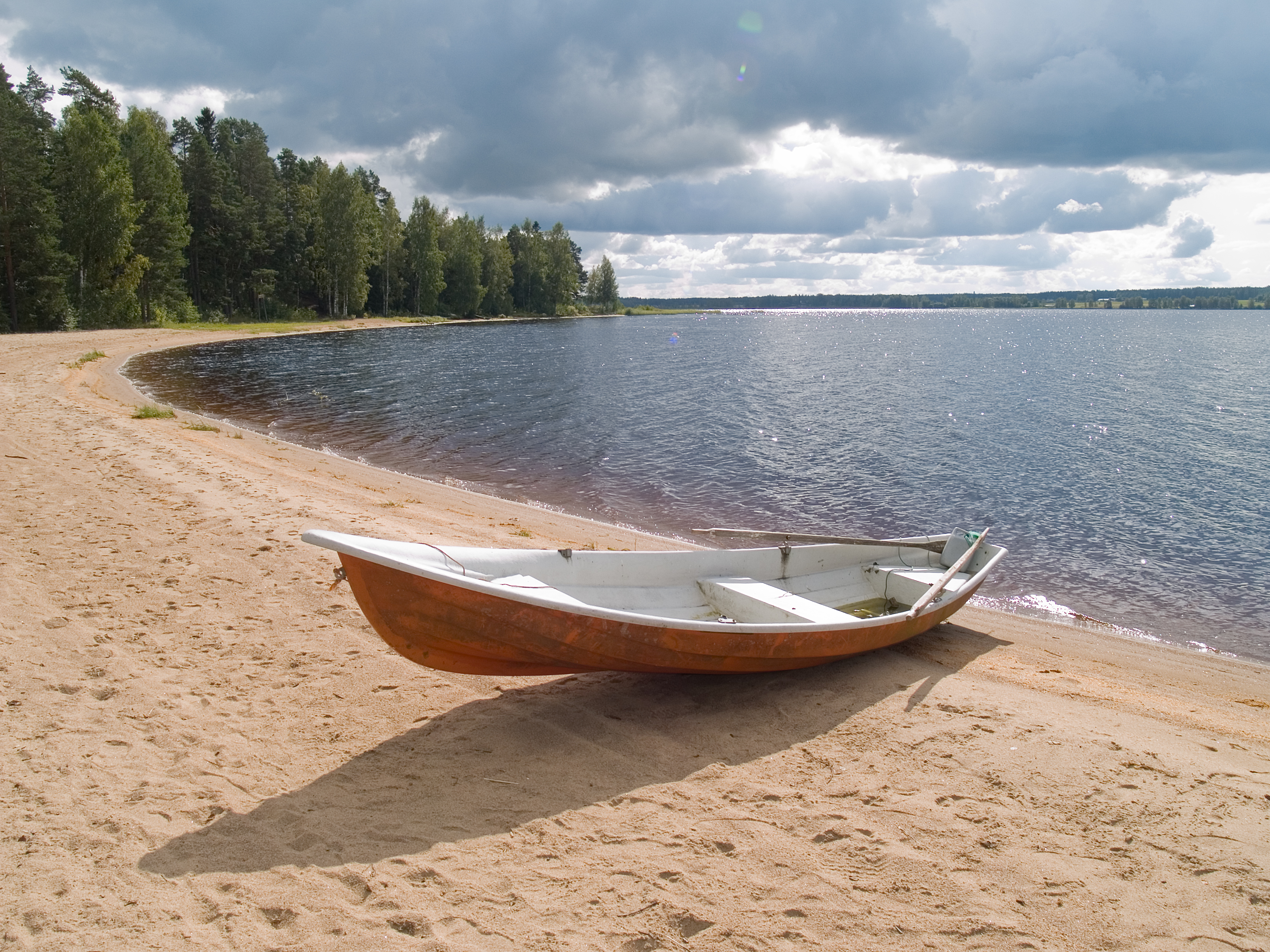

- Location within Finland
- Location: Kuortane, Finland
- Coordinates: 62°49′N 023°27′E
- Primary inflows: Kuhajärvi
- Primary outflows: Lapuanjoki
- Catchment area: 1,266 km^{2} (489 sq mi)
- Basin countries: Finland
- Surface area: 14.88 km^{2} (5.75 sq mi)
- Average depth: 3.34 m (11.0 ft)
- Max. depth: 16.2 m (53 ft)
- Water volume: 0.050 km^{3} (41,000 acre⋅ft)
- Shore length^{1}: 33.8 km (21.0 mi)
- Surface elevation: 75.50 m (247.7 ft)
- Frozen: December-April
- Islands: Honkisaari
- ^{1} Shore length is not a well-defined measure.

Kuortaneenjärvi is a medium-sized lake in the Lapuanjoki main catchment area. It is located in the South Ostrobothnia region in Kuortane, Finland.

== See also ==
- List of lakes in Finland
