= Äkäsjärvi =

- Location within Finland
- Location: Muonio
- Coordinates: 67°49′N 24°08′E
- Type: Lake
- Catchment area: Tornionjoki
- Basin countries: Finland
- Surface area: 13.09 km^{2} (5.05 sq mi)
- Average depth: 2.95 m (9 ft 8 in)
- Max. depth: 12 m (39 ft)
- Water volume: 0.039 km^{3} (32,000 acre⋅ft)
- Shore length^{1}: 49.31 km (30.64 mi)
- Surface elevation: 263.4 m (864 ft)
- Frozen: November–May
- ^{1} Shore length is not a well-defined measure.

Äkäsjärvi is a lake of Finland located in the province of Lapland.

== See also ==
- List of lakes in Finland
