= Enäjärvi =

Lake in Finland

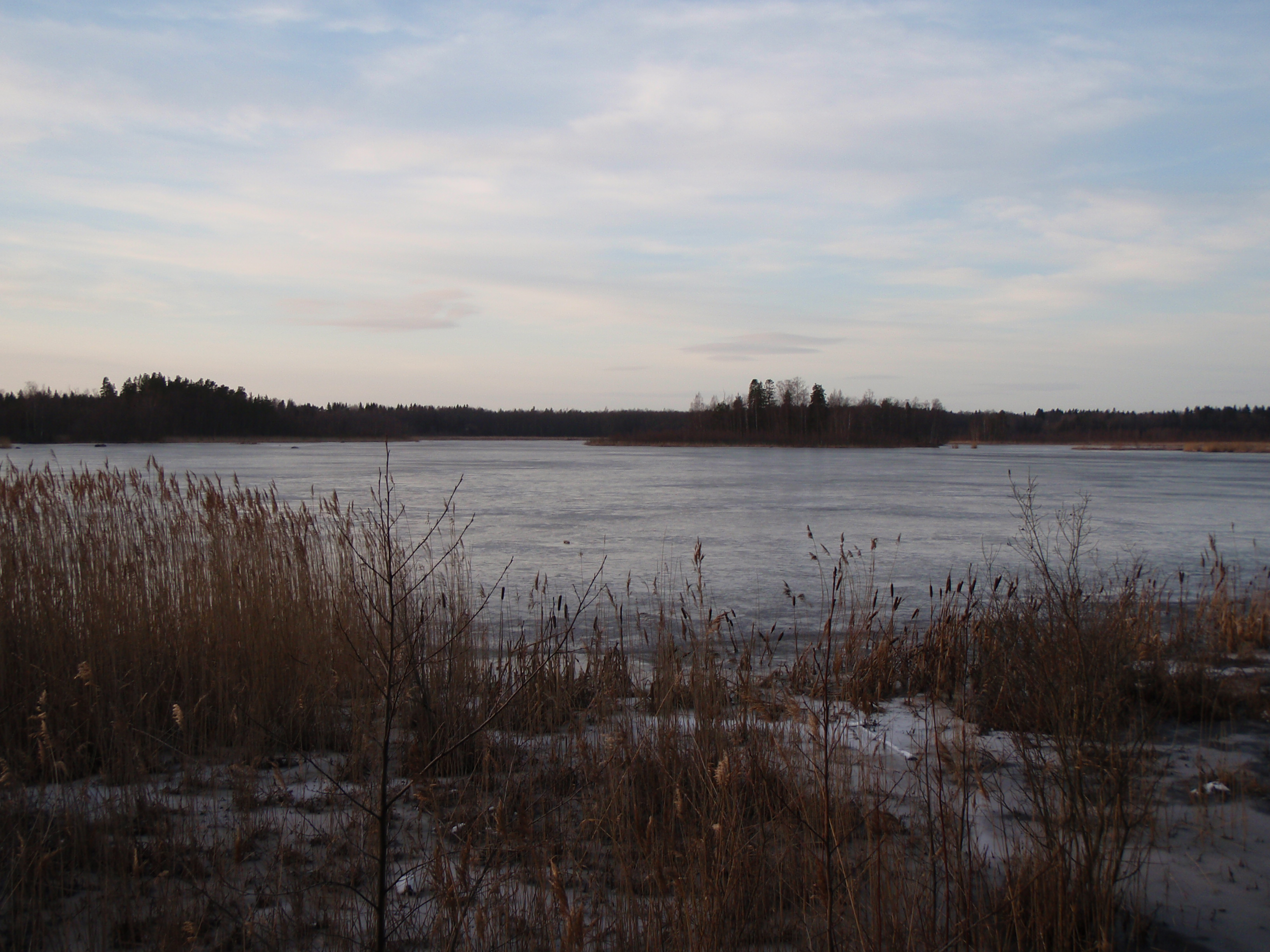
- Lake Enäjärvi seen from the northeast.

- Location within Finland
- Location: Vihti
- Coordinates: 60.3472°N 24.375°E
- Catchment area: 35.54 km^{2} (13.72 sq mi)
- Basin countries: Finland
- Max. depth: 9.1 m (30 ft)
- Surface elevation: 49.4 m (162 ft)

Enäjärvi is a lake in Finland. It is located in the municipality of Vihti in Uusimaa region. The lake is part of Sjundeå å (Finnish: Siuntionjoki) basin that drains into the Gulf of Finland.

In Finland there are also four other lakes with the name Enäjärvi.

== See also ==
- List of lakes in Finland
