= Tuusjärvi =

Lake in Finland

- Location within Finland
- Location: Rantasalmi
- Coordinates: 61°58′N 28°2′E
- Catchment area: Vuoksi
- Basin countries: Finland
- Surface area: 15.61 km^{2} (6.03 sq mi)
- Shore length^{1}: 43.7 km (27.2 mi)
- Surface elevation: 87.9 m (288 ft)
- Frozen: December–May
- Settlements: Rantasalmi
- ^{1} Shore length is not a well-defined measure.

Tuusjärvi is a medium-sized lake in the Vuoksi main catchment area. It is located in the region Southern Savonia in Finland.

== See also ==
- List of lakes in Finland
