= Mutusjärvi =

Lake in the country of Finland

- Location within Lapland
- Coordinates: 68°58′48″N 26°46′54″E
- Catchment area: Paatsjoki
- Basin countries: Finland
- Surface area: 50.446 km^{2} (19.477 sq mi)
- Average depth: 8.5 m (28 ft)
- Max. depth: 74 m (243 ft)
- Water volume: 0.429 km^{3} (348,000 acre⋅ft)
- Shore length^{1}: 160.15 km (99.51 mi)
- Surface elevation: 146.2 m (480 ft)
- Frozen: December–April
- ^{1} Shore length is not a well-defined measure.

Mutusjärvi is a medium-sized lake in the Paatsjoki main catchment area in Lapland region in Finland. Lake is Oligotroph.

== See also ==
- List of lakes in Finland
