= Tipasjärvi =

Lake in Finland

- Location within Finland
- Coordinates: 63°57′N 29°05′E
- Type: Lake
- Primary inflows: Myllyjoki
- Catchment area: Oulujoki
- Basin countries: Finland
- Surface area: 10.972 km^{2} (4.236 sq mi)
- Average depth: 3.83 m (12.6 ft)
- Max. depth: 25 m (82 ft)
- Water volume: 41.4 hm^{3} (33,600 acre⋅ft)
- Shore length^{1}: 57.35 km (35.64 mi)
- Surface elevation: 193.1 m (634 ft)
- Frozen: December–April
- Islands: Vuorissaari, Huuskonsaari
- Settlements: Sotkamo
- ^{1} Shore length is not a well-defined measure.

Tipasjärvi, is a medium-sized lake including two lakes (Iso Tipasjärvi and Pieni Tipasjärvi) in the Oulujoki main catchment area. It is located in the region Kainuu. This contains many small islands, including Vuorissaari and Huuskonsaari.

== See also ==
- List of lakes in Finland
