= Hiirenvesi =

- Location within Finland
- Coordinates: 62°49′N 30°13′E
- Type: Lake
- Catchment area: Vuoksi
- Basin countries: Finland
- Surface area: 12.983 km^{2} (5.013 sq mi)
- Average depth: 3.58 m (11.7 ft)
- Max. depth: 30.97 m (101.6 ft)
- Water volume: 0.0464 km^{3} (37,600 acre⋅ft)
- Shore length^{1}: 63.16 km (39.25 mi)
- Surface elevation: 93.5 m (307 ft)
- Frozen: December–April
- Islands: Häihänsaaret, Putaansaari, Suurisaari
- Settlements: Eno, Finland
- ^{1} Shore length is not a well-defined measure.

Hiirenvesi is a medium-sized lake of eastern Finland. It is located in the Joensuu in the North Karelia region. The lake is part of Vuoksi basin in eastern Finland, that drains into the Lake Ladoga, which in turn is part of the Neva River basin in Russia.

== See also ==
- List of lakes in Finland
