= Kuvansi =

- Location within Finland
- Coordinates: 62°33′N 27°24′E
- Type: Lake
- Primary outflows: Kuivataipale
- Catchment area: Vuoksi
- Basin countries: Finland
- Surface area: 16.029 km^{2} (6.189 sq mi)
- Average depth: 7.54 m (24.7 ft)
- Max. depth: 41 m (135 ft)
- Water volume: 0.121 km^{3} (98,000 acre⋅ft)
- Shore length^{1}: 105.28 km (65.42 mi)
- Surface elevation: 98.5 m (323 ft)
- Frozen: December–April
- Islands: Markkalansaari
- Settlements: Suonenjoki
- ^{1} Shore length is not a well-defined measure.

Kuvansi is a medium-sized lake of Finland in the Vuoksi main catchment area. It is located in the North Savo region and in the municipality of Suonenjoki.

== See also ==
- List of lakes in Finland
