= Luirojärvi =

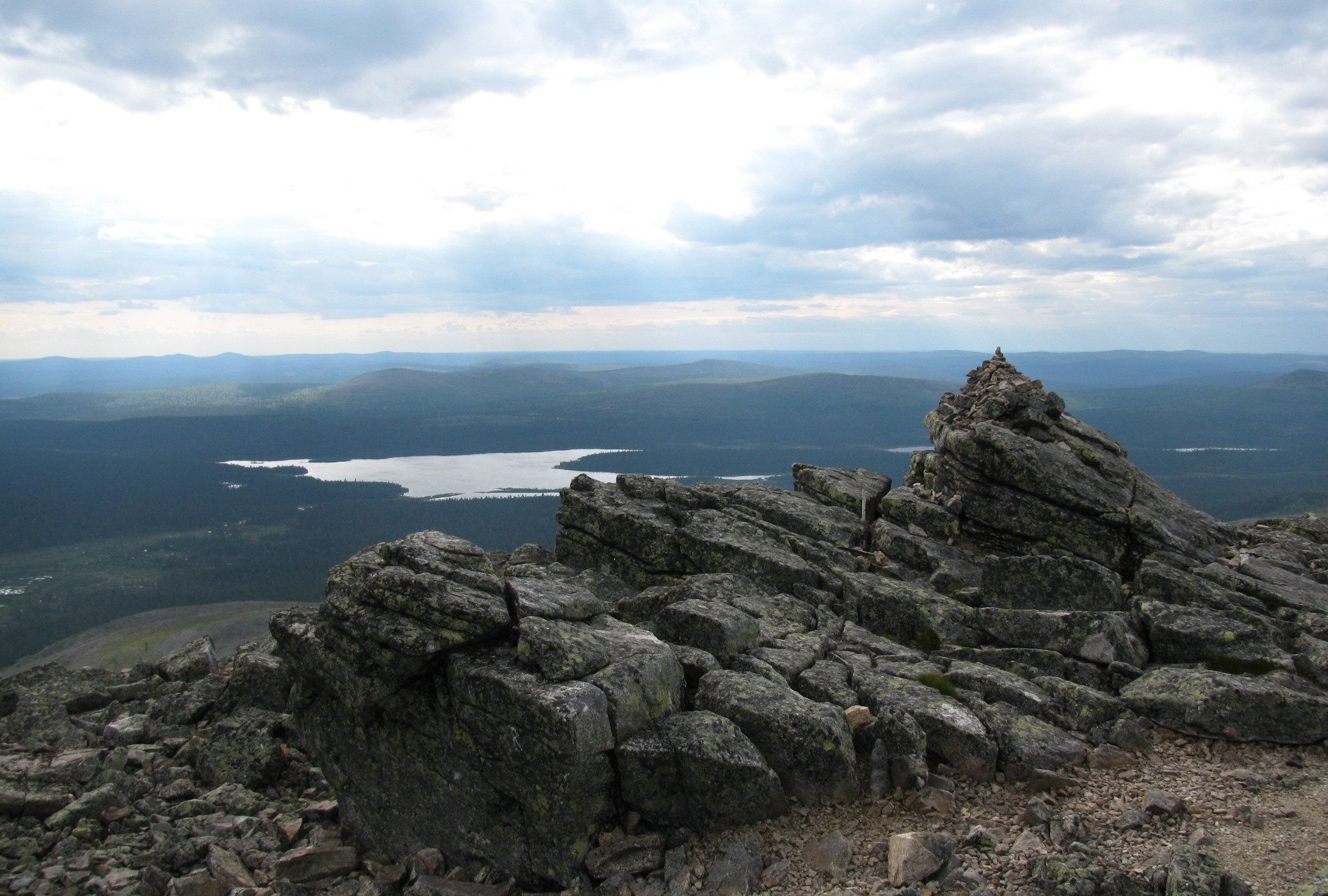
- View from the Sokosti westward to the Luirojärvi

- Location within Lapland
- Coordinates: 68°13′N 28°03′E
- Type: Lake
- Catchment area: Kemijoki
- Basin countries: Finland
- Surface area: 1.443 km^{2} (0.557 sq mi)
- Shore length^{1}: 9.4 km (5.8 mi)
- Surface elevation: 282.9 m (928 ft)
- ^{1} Shore length is not a well-defined measure.

Luirojärvi is a rather small lake of Finland. It is located in Urho Kekkonen National Park in Lapland region.

== See also ==
- List of lakes in Finland
