= Pieni-Kiimanen =

Lake in Finland

- Location within Finland
- Coordinates: 64.152°N 28.51°E
- Primary inflows: Pajusalmi
- Primary outflows: Kusianjoki
- Catchment area: Oulujoki
- Basin countries: Finland
- Surface area: 10.368 km^{2} (4.003 sq mi)
- Average depth: 2.4 m (7 ft 10 in)
- Max. depth: 27 m (89 ft)
- Water volume: 0.0249 km^{3} (20,200 acre⋅ft)
- Shore length^{1}: 36.97 km (22.97 mi)
- Surface elevation: 137.9 m (452 ft)
- Frozen: December–April
- Islands: Salonsaari
- Settlements: Sotkamo
- ^{1} Shore length is not a well-defined measure.

Pieni-Kiimanen is a medium-sized lake in Kainuu region in northern Finland. It is located in Sotkamo and it belongs to the Oulujoki main catchment area. Pieni-Kiimanen is separated from another lake Iso-Kiimanen with strait Pajusalmi.

== See also ==
- List of lakes in Finland
