= Nammijärvi =

Lake in Inari municipality, Finland

- Location within Lapland
- Location: Inari
- Coordinates: 69°08′N 28°42′E
- Basin countries: Finland
- Surface area: 14.999 km^{2} (5.791 sq mi)
- Shore length^{1}: 75.74 km (47.06 mi)
- Surface elevation: 158.5 m (520 ft)
- Frozen: November–May
- ^{1} Shore length is not a well-defined measure.

Nammijärvi is a medium-sized lake in the Paatsjoki main catchment area. It is in Lapland, Finland. The lake is in the Vätsäri Wilderness Area.

== See also ==
- List of lakes in Finland
