= Suuri-Pieksä =

Lake in Finland

- Location within Finland
- Location: Juankoski
- Coordinates: 63°04′39″N 27°59′46″E
- Type: Lake
- Primary outflows: Pieksänjoki, Pieksänkoski
- Catchment area: Vuoksi
- Basin countries: Finland
- Surface area: 12.509 km^{2} (4.830 sq mi)
- Shore length^{1}: 43.12 km (26.79 mi)
- Surface elevation: 85.8 m (281 ft)
- Frozen: December–April
- Islands: Selkäsaari
- ^{1} Shore length is not a well-defined measure.

Suuri-Pieksä is a medium-sized lake of Finland. It belongs to the Vuoksi main catchment area. It is located in the North Savo region and Juankoski municipality.

== See also ==
- List of lakes in Finland
