= Vanttausjärvi =

Lake in Finland

- Location within Lapland
- Coordinates: 66°28′N 26°38′E
- Type: Lake
- Catchment area: Kemijoki
- Basin countries: Finland
- Surface area: 10.29 km^{2} (3.97 sq mi)
- Average depth: 4.59 m (15.1 ft)
- Max. depth: 10 m (33 ft)
- Water volume: 0.0472 km^{3} (38,300 acre⋅ft)
- Shore length^{1}: 29.86 km (18.55 mi)
- Surface elevation: 153.3 m (503 ft)
- Frozen: December–May
- Islands: Isosaari
- Settlements: Rovaniemi
- ^{1} Shore length is not a well-defined measure.

Vanttausjärvi is a medium-sized lake in the Kemijoki main catchment area. It is located in Rovaniemi town in the region of Lapland in Finland.

== See also ==
- List of lakes in Finland
