= Oijärvi =

Lake in Finland

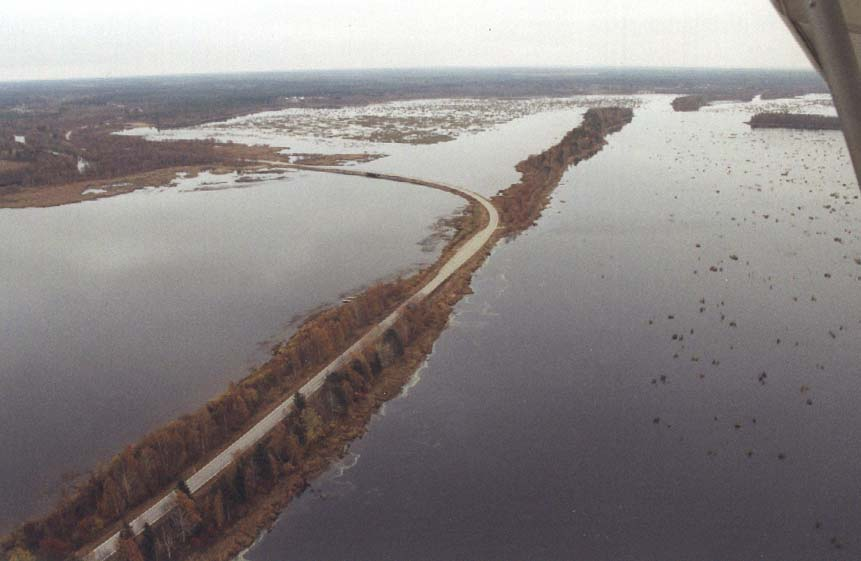

- Location within Finland
- Coordinates: 65°38′N 25°54′E
- Primary inflows: Kivijoki
- Primary outflows: Oijärvi Canal
- Catchment area: Kuivajoki
- Basin countries: Finland
- Surface area: 21.049 km^{2} (8.127 sq mi)
- Average depth: 1.11 m (3 ft 8 in)
- Max. depth: 2.42 m (7 ft 11 in)
- Water volume: 0.0234 km^{3} (19,000 acre⋅ft)
- Shore length^{1}: 60.26 km (37.44 mi)
- Surface elevation: 89.8 m (295 ft)
- Frozen: December–May
- ^{1} Shore length is not a well-defined measure.

Oijärvi is a medium-sized lake of northern Finland in the Kuivajoki main catchment area. It is located in the Northern Ostrobothnia region and Ii municipality. A big part of the lake belongs to the Natura 2000 protection program due to its good environment for birds.

== See also ==
- List of lakes in Finland
