= Kostonjärvi =

Lake in the Northern Ostrobothnia region of Finland

- Location within Finland
- Location: Taivalkoski
- Coordinates: 65°47′N 28°27′E
- Primary inflows: Kynsijoki river
- Primary outflows: Kostonjoki river
- Catchment area: Iijoki
- Basin countries: Finland
- Surface area: 43.69 km^{2} (16.87 sq mi)
- Average depth: 5.09 m (16.7 ft)
- Max. depth: 17 m (56 ft)
- Water volume: 0.222 km^{3} (180,000 acre⋅ft)
- Shore length^{1}: 71.1 km (44.2 mi)
- Surface elevation: 231.6 m (760 ft)
- Frozen: November–May
- ^{1} Shore length is not a well-defined measure.

Kostonjärvi is a medium-sized lake in the Iijoki main catchment area. It is located in Taivalkoski municipality, in the Northern Ostrobothnia region in Finland. The surface elevation on the lake varies almost 5 meter due to the power production.

== See also ==
- List of lakes in Finland
