= Hirvijärvi Reservoir =

Lake in Finland

Hirvijärvi Reservoir (Finland)
- Location within Finland
- Coordinates: 62°48′N 23°06′E
- Type: Reservoir
- Catchment area: Lapuanjoki
- Basin countries: Finland
- Surface area: 15.272 km^{2} (5.897 sq mi)
- Shore length^{1}: 41.8 km (26.0 mi)
- Surface elevation: 88.6 m (291 ft)
- ^{1} Shore length is not a well-defined measure.

Hirvijärvi Reservoir (Finnish: Hirvijärven tekojärvi) is medium-sized lake in the Lapuanjoki main catchment area. It is located in the region South Ostrobothnia, in the municipality of Seinäjoki, Finland.

== See also ==
- List of lakes in Finland
