= Ullavanjärvi =

Lake in Finland

- Location within Finland
- Location: Kokkola
- Coordinates: 63°39′N 24°04′E
- Basin countries: Finland
- Surface area: 13.069 km^{2} (5.046 sq mi)
- Shore length^{1}: 72.8 km (45.2 mi)
- Surface elevation: 112.6 m (369 ft)
- Frozen: December–April
- Islands: Talvisaari, Iso Hiidenluoto
- ^{1} Shore length is not a well-defined measure.

Ullavanjärvi is a medium-sized lake in the Perhonjoki main catchment area. It is located in the region of Central Ostrobothnia in Finland.

== See also ==
- List of lakes in Finland
