= Vuokkijärvi =

Lake in Finland

- Location within Finland
- Location: Suomussalmi
- Coordinates: 64°46′N 29°21′E
- Primary outflows: Niipaskoski
- Catchment area: Oulujoki
- Basin countries: Finland
- Max. length: 30 km (19 mi)
- Surface area: 51.241 km^{2} (19.784 sq mi)
- Average depth: 5.42 m (17.8 ft)
- Max. depth: 24 m (79 ft)
- Water volume: 0.278 km^{3} (225,000 acre⋅ft)
- Shore length^{1}: 192.16 km (119.40 mi)
- Surface elevation: 188.9 m (620 ft)
- Frozen: November–May
- Islands: Selkäsaari, Siikasaari
- ^{1} Shore length is not a well-defined measure.

Vuokkijärvi is a medium-sized lake in the Oulujoki main catchment area. It is located in the region of Kainuu, eastern Finland. The surface level of the lake is strongly regulated due to power production. Elevation can vary between 183.72 and 189.72 meters.

== See also ==
- List of lakes in Finland
