= Suolisjärvi =

Lake in Finland

- Location within Lapland
- Coordinates: 69°24′N 28°42′E
- Basin countries: Finland
- Surface area: 19.419 km^{2} (7.498 sq mi)
- Shore length^{1}: 111.65 km (69.38 mi)
- Surface elevation: 120.9 m (397 ft)
- Frozen: December–April
- Islands: Isosaari
- Settlements: Inari
- ^{1} Shore length is not a well-defined measure.

Suolisjärvi is a medium-sized lake in the Paatsjoki main catchment area. It is located in the eastern Lapland region in Finland. The lake is in the border of Vätsäri Wilderness Area.

== See also ==
- List of lakes in Finland
