= Maavesi =

- Location within Finland
- Coordinates: 62°12′N 27°32′E
- Type: lake
- Primary outflows: Kiekka power station
- Basin countries: Finland
- Surface area: 32.715 km^{2} (12.631 sq mi)
- Average depth: 5.78 m (19.0 ft)
- Max. depth: 26.8 m (88 ft)
- Water volume: 0.189 km^{3} (153,000 acre⋅ft)
- Shore length^{1}: 147.12 km (91.42 mi)
- Surface elevation: 99 m (325 ft)
- Frozen: November–April
- ^{1} Shore length is not a well-defined measure.

Maavesi is a medium-sized lake of Southern Savonia, in eastern Finland.

== See also ==
- List of lakes in Finland
