= Suininki =

Lake in Finland

- Location within Finland
- Coordinates: 66°04′N 29°39′E
- Type: Lake
- Primary inflows: Kurikkajoki
- Primary outflows: Varisjoki
- Catchment area: Koutajoki
- Basin countries: Finland
- Surface area: 21.713 km^{2} (8.383 sq mi)
- Average depth: 6.76 m (22.2 ft)
- Max. depth: 26.12 m (85.7 ft)
- Water volume: 0.147 km^{3} (119,000 acre⋅ft)
- Shore length^{1}: 72.19 km (44.86 mi)
- Surface elevation: 252 m (827 ft)
- Frozen: December–May
- Settlements: Kuusamo
- ^{1} Shore length is not a well-defined measure.

Suininki is a medium-sized lake in the Koutajoki main catchment area. It is located in Kuusamo municipality the region of Northern Ostrobothnia in Finland. Lake Suininki is a part of the Kuusinki catchment area.

== See also ==
- List of lakes in Finland
