= Posionjärvi =

Lake in Finland

- Location within Lapland
- Coordinates: 66°08′N 28°02′E
- Type: Lake
- Primary inflows: Karisalmi strait, lake Posionperä
- Primary outflows: Ahvensalmi strait, lake Yli-Kitka
- Catchment area: Koutajoki
- Basin countries: Finland
- Surface area: 18.89 km^{2} (7.29 sq mi)
- Average depth: 2.42 m (7 ft 11 in)
- Max. depth: 11 m (36 ft)
- Water volume: 0.045 km^{3} (36,000 acre⋅ft)
- Shore length^{1}: 146.46 km (91.01 mi)
- Surface elevation: 240.2 m (788 ft)
- Frozen: November–May
- Islands: Halkosaaret, Maaninkasaaret
- Settlements: Posio
- ^{1} Shore length is not a well-defined measure.

Posionjärvi is a medium-sized lake in the Koutajoki main catchment area. It is located in Posio municipality, in the region Lapland in Finland.

There are 187 islands in the lake.

== See also ==
- List of lakes in Finland
