= Synsiä =

Lake in Finland

- Location within Finland
- Coordinates: 62°05′N 26°30.5′E
- Catchment area: Kymijoki
- Basin countries: Finland
- Surface area: 19.273 km^{2} (7.441 sq mi)
- Shore length^{1}: 84.35 km (52.41 mi)
- Surface elevation: 110.4 m (362 ft)
- Frozen: December–April
- ^{1} Shore length is not a well-defined measure.

Synsiä is a medium-sized lake in Southern Savonia, Finland. The lake is quite shallow. It is located in Kangasniemi municipality near the Finnish National Road 13. From the road there is a nice scenery to the lake and the farms around it.

== See also ==
- List of lakes in Finland
