= Surnujärvi =

Lake in Finland

- Location within Lapland
- Location: Inari
- Coordinates: 69°23′N 29°04′E
- Type: Lake
- Catchment area: Paatsjoki
- Basin countries: Finland
- Surface area: 14.436 km^{2} (5.574 sq mi)
- Shore length^{1}: 78.35 km (48.68 mi)
- Surface elevation: 160.2 m (526 ft)
- Frozen: November–May
- ^{1} Shore length is not a well-defined measure.

Surnujärvi is a medium-sized lake in the Paatsjoki main catchment area. It is located in the region Lapland in Finland. Almost the whole lake is situated in Vätsäri Wilderness Area.

== See also ==
- List of lakes in Finland
