= Sorsavesi =

Body of water in Finland

- Location within Finland
- Coordinates: 62°30′N 027°33′E
- Basin countries: Finland
- Surface area: 54.984 km^{2} (21.229 sq mi)
- Average depth: 9.56 m (31.4 ft)
- Max. depth: 61.5 m (202 ft)
- Water volume: 0.526 km^{3} (426,000 acre⋅ft)
- Shore length^{1}: 386.79 km (240.34 mi)
- Surface elevation: 98 m (322 ft)
- Frozen: December–April
- Islands: Virtasalo, Lamposaari, Havukkasaari, Viitasaari
- Settlements: Sorsakoski, Tihusniemi, Jäppilä
- ^{1} Shore length is not a well-defined measure.

Sorsavesi is a medium-sized lake in the southeast of Finland, in the regions of South Savo and North Savo. It belongs to Vuoksi main catchment area.

== See also ==
- List of lakes in Finland
