= Maaninkajärvi =

- Location within Finland
- Coordinates: 63°10′N 27°16′E
- Type: Lake
- Basin countries: Finland
- Surface area: 24.353 km^{2} (9.403 sq mi)
- Average depth: 10.58 m (34.7 ft)
- Max. depth: 70.42 m (231.0 ft)
- Water volume: 0.258 km^{3} (209,000 acre⋅ft)
- Shore length^{1}: 108.36 km (67.33 mi)
- Surface elevation: 81.9 m (269 ft)
- Frozen: December–April
- Islands: Keskisaari, 0,224 km^{2}
- Settlements: Maaninka
- ^{1} Shore length is not a well-defined measure.

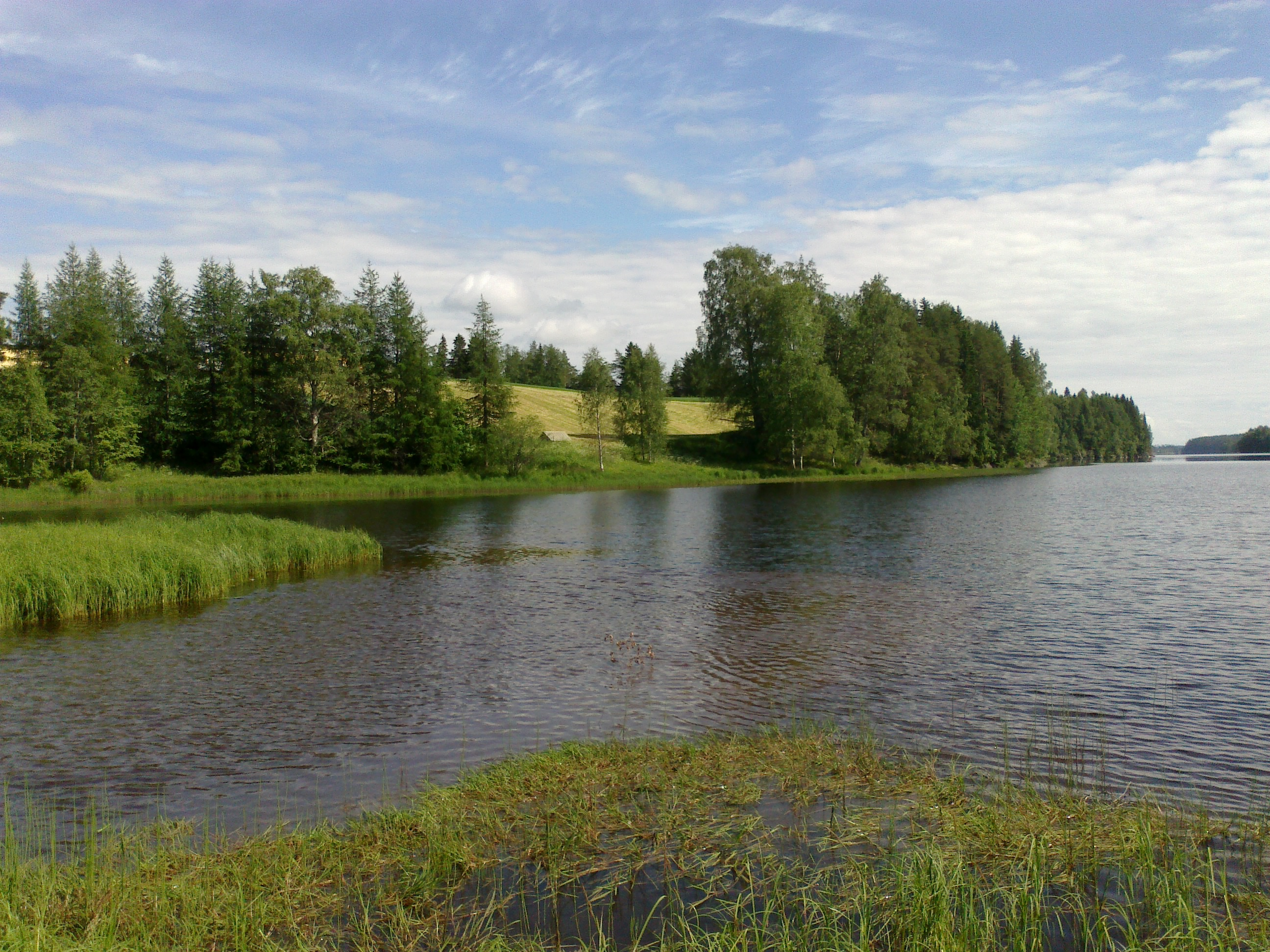
Lake Maaninkajärvi

Maaninkajärvi is a medium-sized lake of Finland. It belongs to the Vuoksi main catchment area. It is located in the North Savo region and in Maaninka municipality. Is it quite a deep lake: in the southern part the mean depth is 24 meters.

== See also ==
- List of lakes in Finland
