= Iso Lohijärvi =

- Location within Lapland
- Coordinates: 66°26′N 24°21′E
- Type: Lake
- Primary inflows: Lialompolo
- Primary outflows: Lohiniva
- Catchment area: Tornionjoki
- Basin countries: Finland
- Surface area: 14.608 km^{2} (5.640 sq mi)
- Average depth: 1.48 m (4 ft 10 in)
- Max. depth: 5.8 m (19 ft)
- Water volume: 0.0214 km^{3} (17,300 acre⋅ft)
- Shore length^{1}: 33.94 km (21.09 mi)
- Surface elevation: 74 m (243 ft)
- Frozen: December–May
- Islands: none
- ^{1} Shore length is not a well-defined measure.

Iso Lohijärvi is a medium-sized lake in the Tornionjoki main catchment area. It is located in Ylitornio municipality, in the Lapland region in Finland.

== See also ==
- List of lakes in Finland
