= Otermanjärvi =

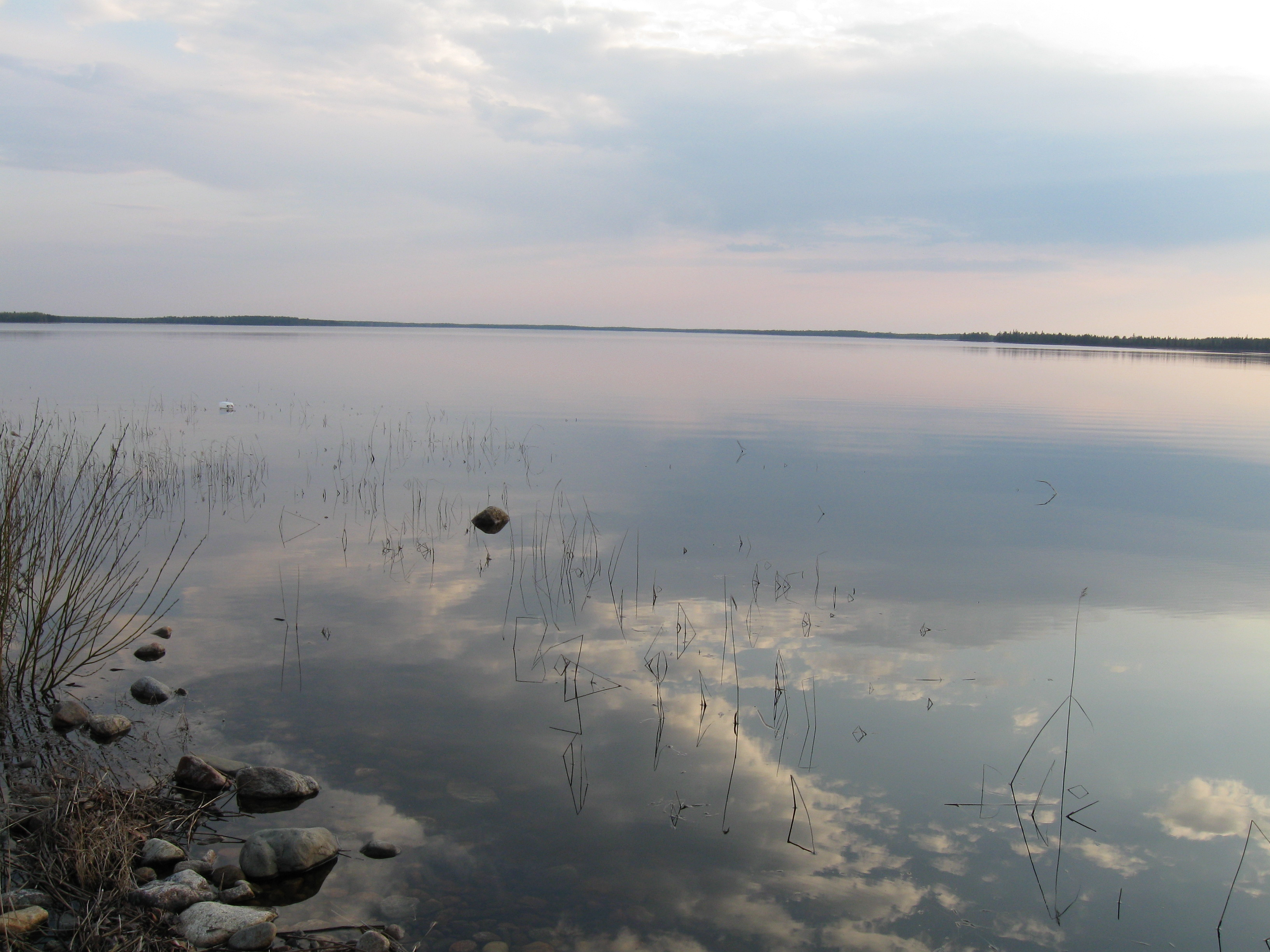

- Location within Finland
- Location: Vaala
- Coordinates: 64°39′N 027°05′E
- Type: Lake
- Catchment area: Oulujoki
- Basin countries: Finland
- Surface area: 21.124 km^{2} (8.156 sq mi)
- Average depth: 2 m (6 ft 7 in)
- Max. depth: 5.47 m (17.9 ft)
- Water volume: 0.0422 km^{3} (34,200 acre⋅ft)
- Shore length^{1}: 52.46 km (32.60 mi)
- Surface elevation: 140.6 m (461 ft)
- Frozen: December–April
- Islands: Holapansaari
- ^{1} Shore length is not a well-defined measure.

Otermanjärvi is a medium-sized lake in Vaala municipality, in Finland. It belongs to the Oulujoki main catchment area.

== See also ==
- List of lakes in Finland
