= Norvajärvi =

Lake in the country of Finland

Coordinates: 66°37′N 25°45′E

- Location within Lapland
- Location: Rovaniemi
- Type: Lake
- Primary outflows: Pitkäkoski rapids
- Catchment area: Kemijoki
- Basin countries: Finland
- Surface area: 11.8 km^{2} (4.6 sq mi)
- Average depth: 5.16 m (16.9 ft)
- Max. depth: 16 m (52 ft)
- Water volume: 0.0609 km^{3} (49,400 acre⋅ft)
- Shore length^{1}: 29.33 km (18.22 mi)
- Surface elevation: 116.8 m (383 ft)
- Frozen: November–April
- Settlements: Rovaniemi
- ^{1} Shore length is not a well-defined measure.

Norvajärvi is a medium-sized lake in the Kemijoki main catchment area. It is located in the region Lapland in Finland.

== See also ==
- List of lakes in Finland
