= Rahajärvi =

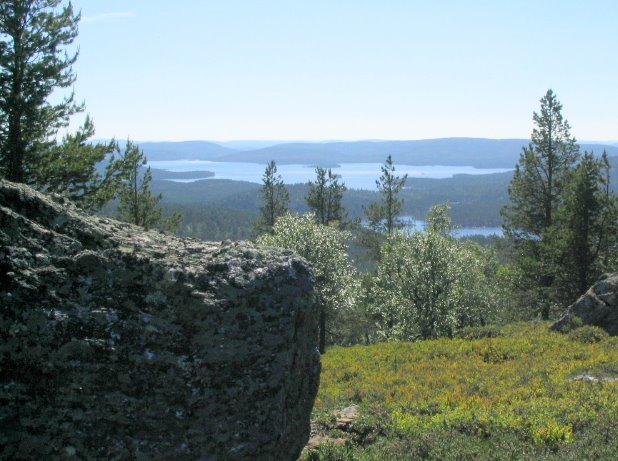
- The view from above Rahajärvi

- Location within Lapland
- Coordinates: 68°45′N 27°25′E
- Type: Lake
- Basin countries: Finland
- Surface area: 22.136 km^{2} (8.547 sq mi)
- Shore length^{1}: 74.52 km (46.30 mi)
- Surface elevation: 132 m (433 ft)
- Frozen: November–May
- Islands: Kenkisaari
- ^{1} Shore length is not a well-defined measure.

Rahajärvi (also: Raahajärvi) is a medium-sized lake in the Paatsjoki main catchment area. It is located in the municipality of Inari in the region Lapland in Finland. The lake has major and minor part. It is situated near the Finnish National Road 4.

== See also ==
- List of lakes in Finland
