= Tallusjärvi =

Lake in Finland

- Location within Finland
- Coordinates: 63°00′N 26°58′E
- Type: Lake
- Catchment area: Kymijoki
- Basin countries: Finland
- Surface area: 22.104 km^{2} (8.534 sq mi)
- Average depth: 2.06 m (6 ft 9 in)
- Max. depth: 11.67 m (38.3 ft)
- Water volume: 0.0456 km^{3} (37,000 acre⋅ft)
- Shore length^{1}: 138.69 km (86.18 mi)
- Surface elevation: 104.7 m (344 ft)
- Settlements: Tervo
- ^{1} Shore length is not a well-defined measure.

Tallusjärvi is a medium-sized lake in the Kymijoki main catchment area. It is located in the region North Savo in Finland.

== See also ==
- List of lakes in Finland
