= Syvänsi =

Lake in South Savonia, Finland

- Location within Finland
- Coordinates: 62.345°N 27.52°E
- Catchment area: Vuoksi
- Basin countries: Finland
- Surface area: 14.935 km^{2} (5.766 sq mi)
- Average depth: 6.92 m (22.7 ft)
- Max. depth: 38.62 m (126.7 ft)
- Water volume: 0.103 km^{3} (84,000 acre⋅ft)
- Shore length^{1}: 78.15 km (48.56 mi)
- Surface elevation: 102.2 m (335 ft)
- Frozen: December–April
- Settlements: Jäppilä
- ^{1} Shore length is not a well-defined measure.

Syvänsi is a medium-sized lake in the Vuoksi main catchment area. It is located in the region Southern Savonia.

== See also ==
- List of lakes in Finland
