= Aapajärvi =

Lake in Finland

- Location within Finland
- Coordinates: 66°04′38″N 24°10′08″E
- Basin countries: Finland
- Average depth: 1.4 m (4 ft 7 in)
- Max. depth: 4.7 m (15 ft)

Aapajärvi is the biggest lake in Tornio, Finland. The deepest point of the lake is 4.7 meters and the coastal perimeter is 10.1 kilometers.

Aapajärvi is also the name of a village with a population of about 130 (2014). The village is 38 km away from Tornio. People in the village live near the west and north coasts of lake Aapajärvi.

In Finish Lapland there are two Aapajärvi lakes; another is in Pelkosenniemi.

== See also ==
- List of lakes in Finland

== Bibliography ==
- Finnish Environment Institute: Lakes in Finland
- Etelä-Savon ympäristökeskus: Saimaa, nimet ja rajaukset (in Finnish)
