= Vaalajärvi =

Lake in Finland

- Location within Lapland
- Location: Sodankylä, Finland
- Coordinates: 67°25′N 026°10′E
- Primary outflows: Vaalajoki
- Basin countries: Finland
- Surface area: 13.065 km^{2} (5.044 sq mi)
- Average depth: 1.53 m (5 ft 0 in)
- Max. depth: 2.8 m (9 ft 2 in)
- Water volume: 0.0198 km^{3} (16,100 acre⋅ft)
- Shore length^{1}: 25.46 km (15.82 mi)
- Surface elevation: 201.3 m (660 ft)
- Settlements: Vaalajärvi village
- ^{1} Shore length is not a well-defined measure.

Vaalajärvi is a medium-sized lake in the Kemijoki main catchment area. It is located in Sodankylä municipality in the region Lapland in Finland. In the area there is a canoeing route lake Vaalajärvi–river Jeesiöjoki–river Kitinen.

== See also ==
- List of lakes in Finland
