= Karankajärvi =

Lake in Saarijärvi, Finland

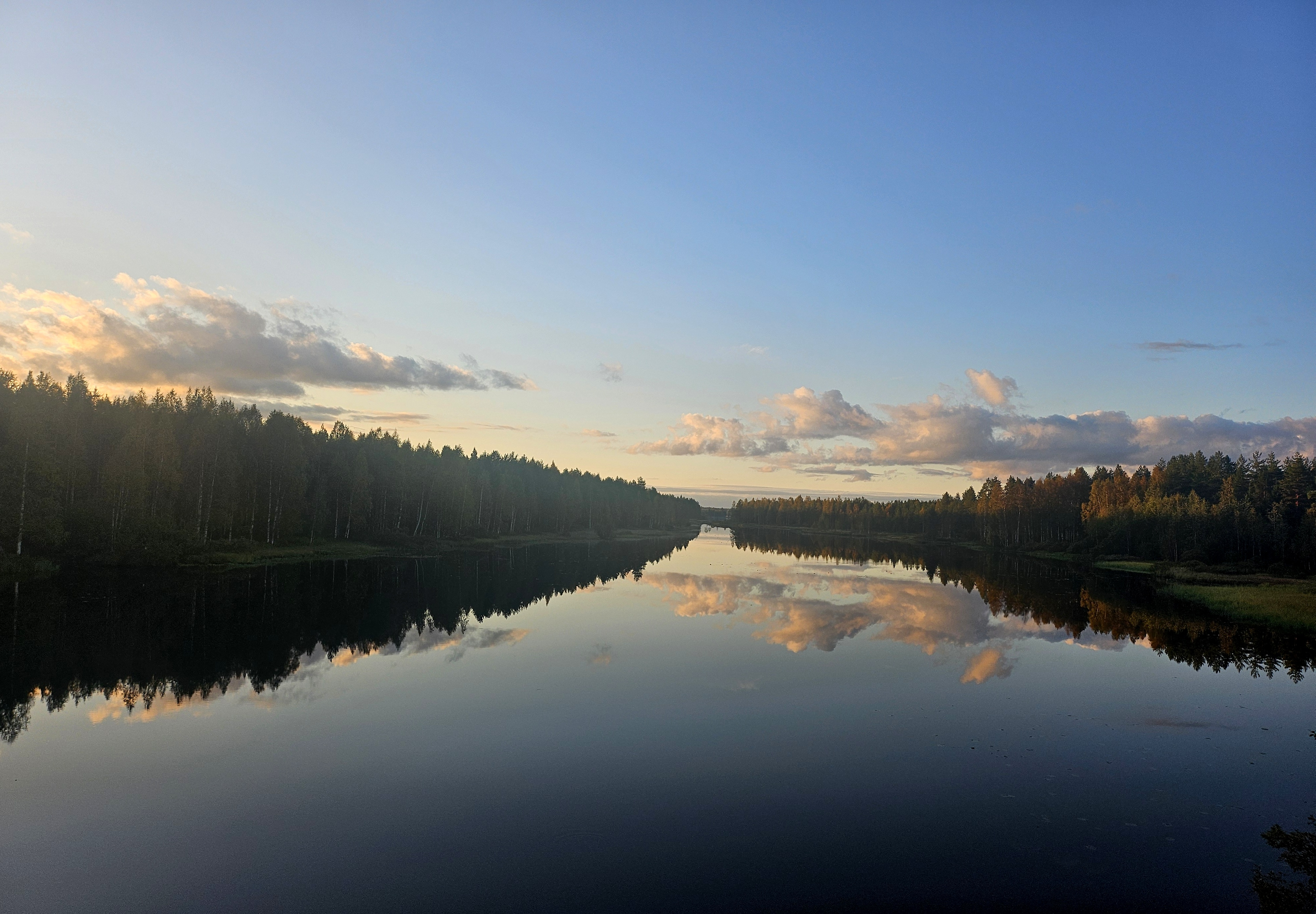
- Karankajarvi Lake

- Location within Finland
- Coordinates: 62°43′30″N 24°50′30″E
- Primary inflows: Vihanninjoki
- Primary outflows: Karajoki
- Basin countries: Finland
- Surface area: 11.012 km^{2} (4.252 sq mi)
- Average depth: 4 m (13 ft)
- Max. depth: 23 m (75 ft)
- Water volume: 0.044 km^{3} (36,000 acre⋅ft)
- Shore length^{1}: 46.08 km (28.63 mi)
- Surface elevation: 148.7 m (488 ft)
- Frozen: December–April
- Settlements: Saarijärvi
- ^{1} Shore length is not a well-defined measure.

Karankajärvi is a medium-sized lake in the Kymijoki main catchment area. It is located in the region Central Finland and in Saarijärvi municipality. A strait divides the lake in two parts, Ala-Karanka and Ylä-Karanka.

In Finland there are 4 lakes that are called Karankajärvi. This is the biggest of them.

== See also ==
- List of lakes in Finland
