= Nuoramoisjärvi =

Lake in Finland

- Location within Finland
- Coordinates: 61°26′N 25°47′E
- Type: Lake
- Basin countries: Finland
- Surface area: 13.41 km^{2} (5.18 sq mi)
- Average depth: 3.98 m (13.1 ft)
- Max. depth: 18.9 m (62 ft)
- Water volume: 0.0534 km^{3} (43,300 acre⋅ft)
- Shore length^{1}: 41.44 km (25.75 mi)
- Surface elevation: 82.4 m (270 ft)
- Frozen: December−April
- Islands: Selkäsaari, Kaarnesaari
- Settlements: Sysmä
- ^{1} Shore length is not a well-defined measure.

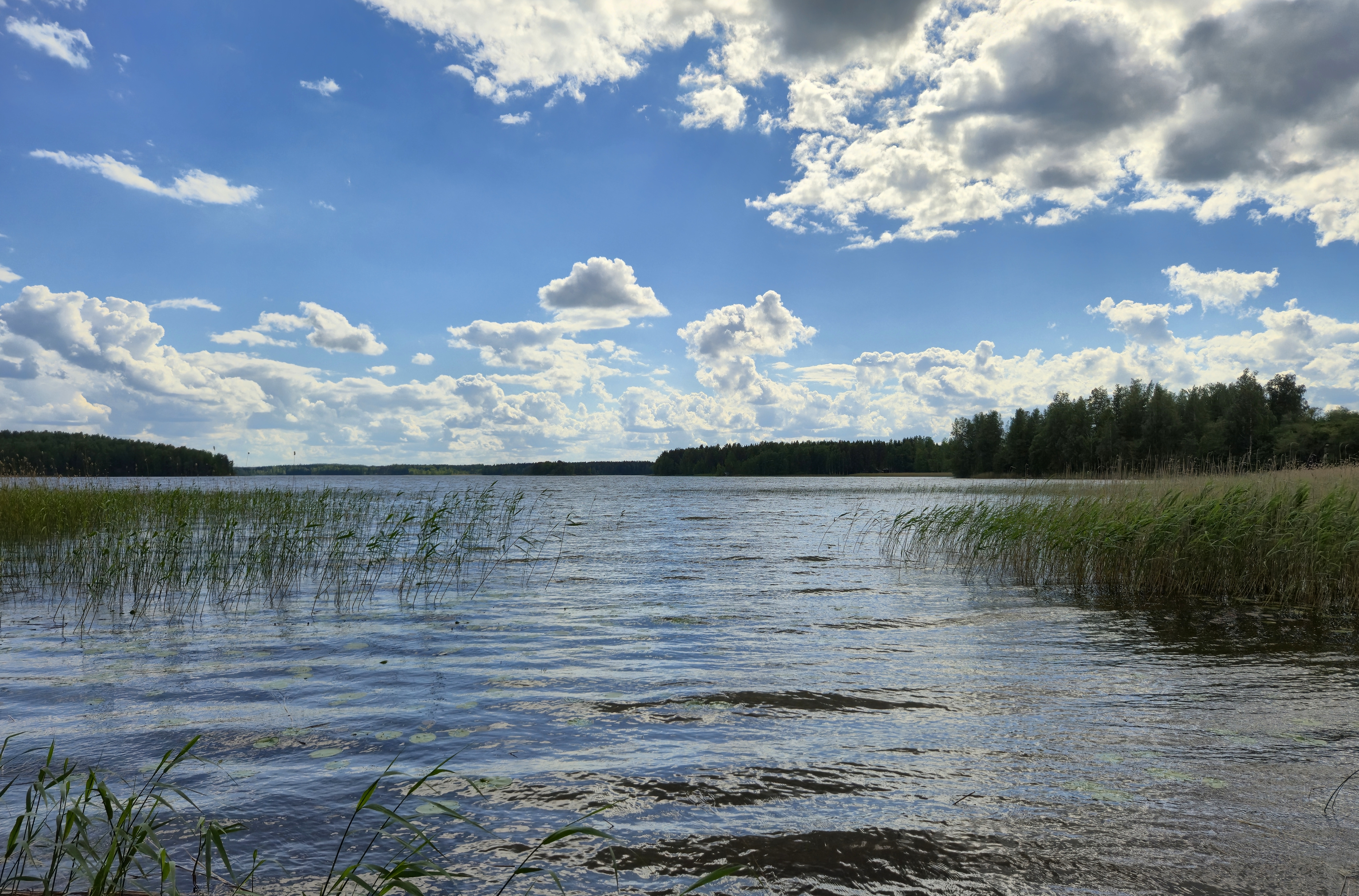

Nuoramoisjärvi is a medium-sized lake in the Kymijoki main catchment area. It is located in Sysmä, Päijät-Häme region.

== See also ==
- List of lakes in Finland
