= Pulmankijärvi =

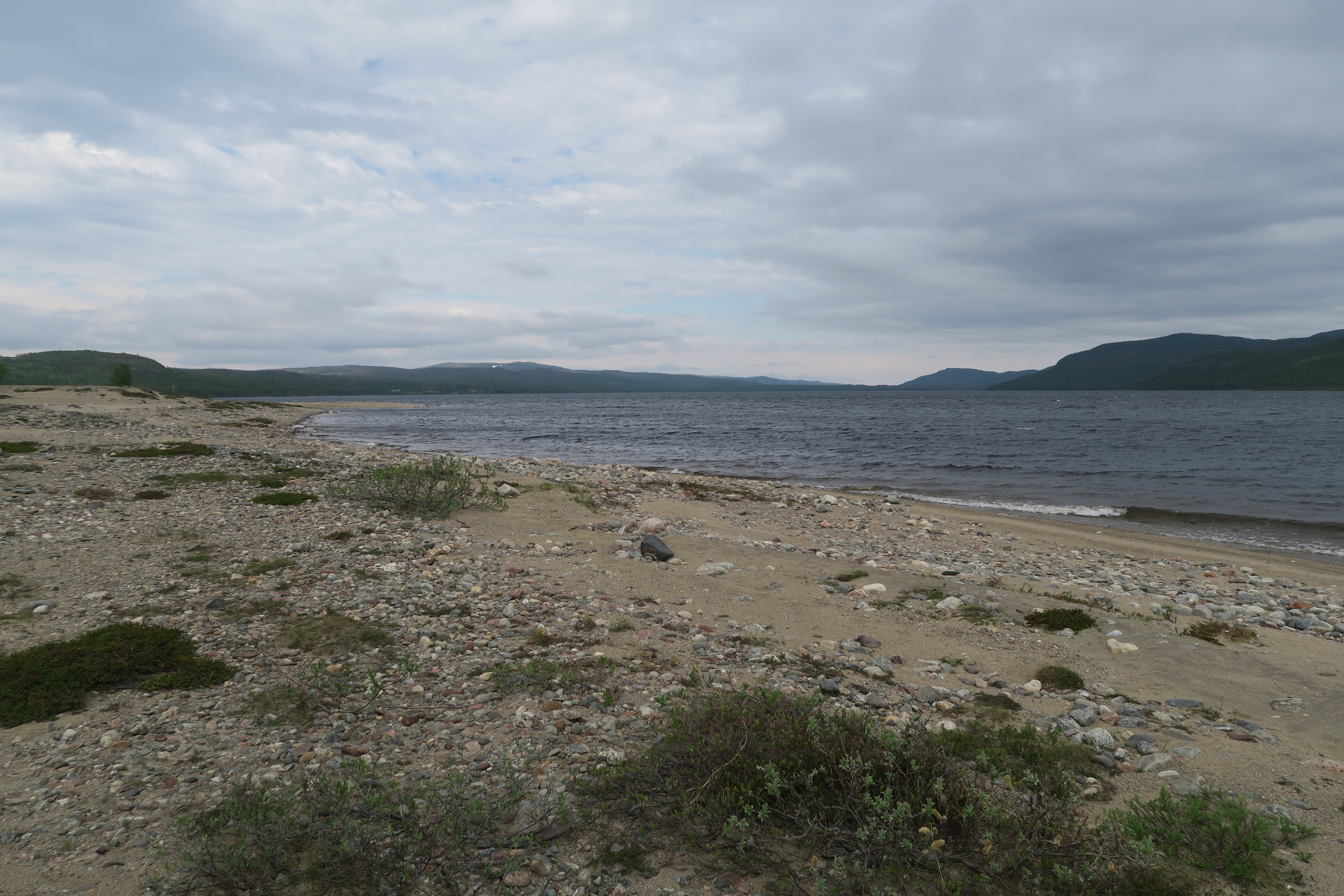
- Pulmankijärvi

- Location within Lapland
- Coordinates: 70°00′N 28°00′E
- Type: Lake
- Catchment area: Teno main catchment
- Basin countries: Finland
- Surface area: 12.186 km^{2} (4.705 sq mi)
- Max. depth: 35 m (115 ft)
- Shore length^{1}: 24.42 km (15.17 mi)
- Surface elevation: 14.6 m (48 ft)
- ^{1} Shore length is not a well-defined measure.

Pulmankijärvi (Norwegian Bokmål: Polmakvannet, Norwegian Nynorsk: Polmakvatnet, Northern Sami: Buolbmátjávri or Buolbmatjávri) is a medium-sized lake in the region of Lapland in Finland. The northern part of the lake belongs to Norway. The integer coordinates point 70°N 28°E lies within the lake on the Finnish side of the border.

== See also ==
- List of lakes in Finland
