= Joutsjärvi =

Lake in Sysmä, Finland

- Joutsjärvi

- Location within Finland
- Coordinates: 61°31′N 25°50′E
- Basin countries: Finland
- Surface area: 10.123 km^{2} (3.909 sq mi)
- Average depth: 3.79 m (12.4 ft)
- Max. depth: 23.66 m (77.6 ft)
- Water volume: 0.0384 km^{3} (31,100 acre⋅ft)
- Shore length^{1}: 53.6 km (33.3 mi)
- Surface elevation: 85.6 m (281 ft)
- Settlements: Sysmä
- ^{1} Shore length is not a well-defined measure.

Joutsjärvi is a medium-sized lake in the Kymijoki main catchment area. It is located in the region Päijät-Häme in Finland.

== See also ==
- List of lakes in Finland
