= Puujärvi =

Lake in Finland

Kuohijärvi
- Location within Finland
- Location: Lohja
- Coordinates: 60°15′00″N 23°42′00″E
- Basin countries: Finland
- Surface area: 6.44 km^{2} (2.49 sq mi)
- Average depth: 8.33 km^{2} (3.22 sq mi)
- Max. depth: 21.68 km^{2} (8.37 sq mi)

Puujärvi is a lake in Lohja, southern Finland. It is located to the west of Lohjanjärvi. The center of Karjalohja is located by a cane that separates the lakes from each other. Puujärvi is part of the main water area of Karjaanjoki.

The wood lake is rugged, clear and deep. Its ecological and chemical status is good. Of the eleven islands of the lake, the largest are the Pussisars (Selkäsaari) and Tupassaari. The shores of Lake Puujärvi are rather dense and the lake gets diffused from both agriculture and housing.

In the vicinity of Puujärvi, there are several nature complexes, such as Heponiemi Tammisto and Rautlammi and Sikasuo.

== See also ==
- List of lakes in Finland
