= Lappalanjärvi =

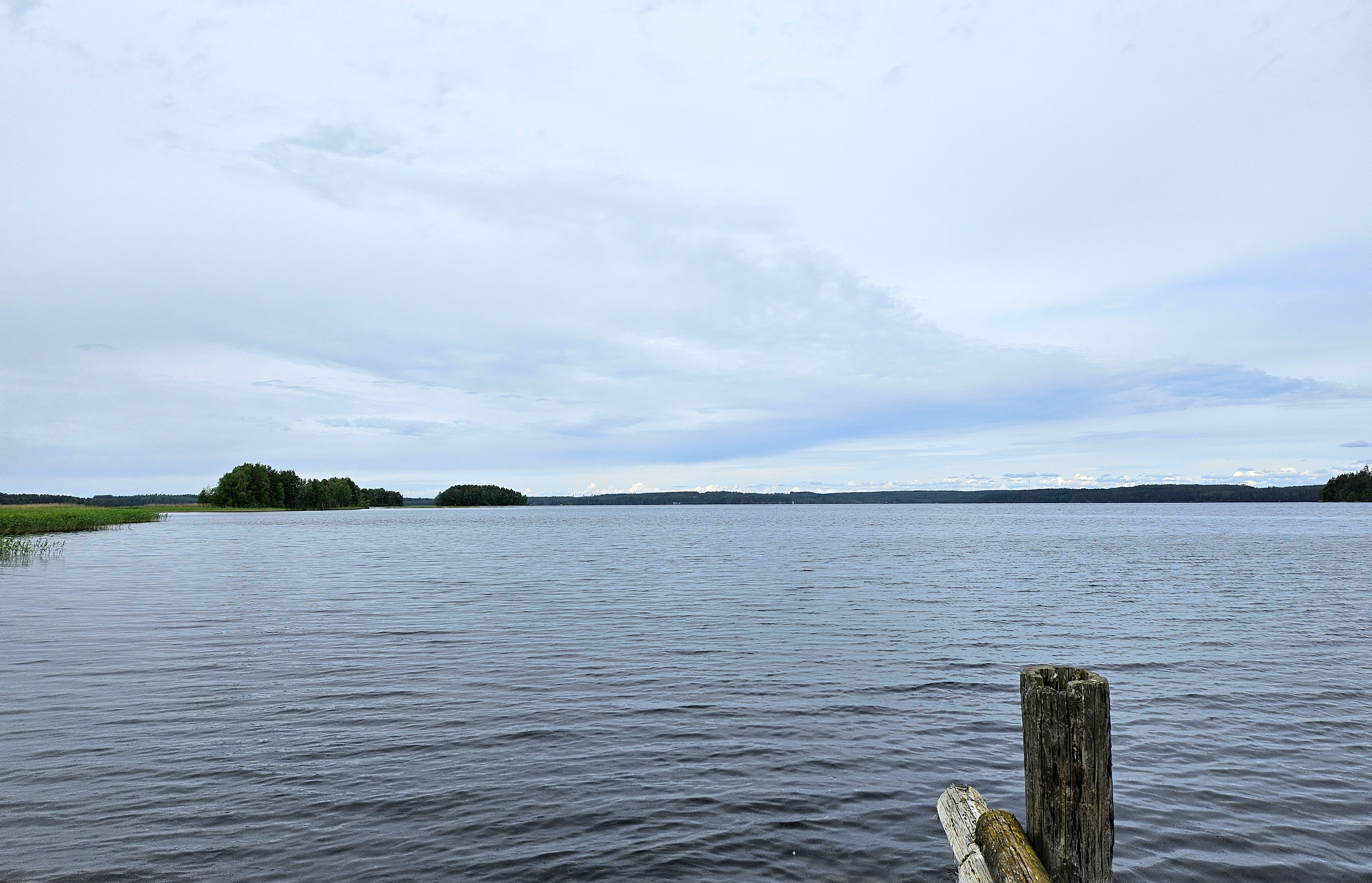
- Lappalanjärvi lake

- Location within Finland
- Coordinates: 60°56′N 26°45′E
- Type: Lake
- Primary inflows: Jokelanjoki
- Primary outflows: Harjunjoki
- Catchment area: Kymijoki
- Basin countries: Finland
- Surface area: 12.857 km^{2} (4.964 sq mi)
- Average depth: 4.57 m (15.0 ft)
- Max. depth: 16.67 m (54.7 ft)
- Water volume: 0.0587 km^{3} (47,600 acre⋅ft)
- Shore length^{1}: 29.66 km (18.43 mi)
- Surface elevation: 56.1 m (184 ft)
- Frozen: December–April
- Settlements: Kouvola
- ^{1} Shore length is not a well-defined measure.

Lappalanjärvi is a medium-sized lake of Finland in the Kouvola municipality in the region Kymenlaakso. It belongs to the Kymijoki main catchment area.

== See also ==
- List of lakes in Finland
