= Nitsijärvi =

- Location within Lapland
- Coordinates: 69°14′N 28°03′E
- Type: Lake
- Catchment area: Paatsjoki
- Basin countries: Finland
- Surface area: 42.283 km^{2} (16.326 sq mi)
- Average depth: 6.45 m (21.2 ft)
- Max. depth: 32.25 m (105.8 ft)
- Water volume: 0.273 km^{3} (221,000 acre⋅ft)
- Shore length^{1}: 206.04 km (128.03 mi)
- Surface elevation: 119.6 m (392 ft)
- Settlements: Näätämö
- ^{1} Shore length is not a well-defined measure.

Nitsijärvi (Skolt Sami: Njeʹǯǯjäuʹrr) is a medium-sized lake in the Lapland of Finland. It is situated only 68 km from the Norwegian border, in the village of Näätämö. It belongs to the Paatsjoki main catchment area.

== See also ==
- List of lakes in Finland
