= Ukonvesi =

Lake in Finland

- Location within Finland
- Location: Mikkeli
- Coordinates: 61°36′N 27°18′E
- Primary inflows: Siikasalmi strait
- Primary outflows: Juurisalmi strait, Haapakaarre
- Catchment area: Vuoksi
- Basin countries: Finland
- Surface area: 24.233 km^{2} (9.356 sq mi)
- Average depth: 5.91 m (19.4 ft)
- Max. depth: 30.44 m (99.9 ft)
- Water volume: 0.143 km^{3} (116,000 acre⋅ft)
- Shore length^{1}: 162.84 km (101.18 mi)
- Surface elevation: 75.7 m (248 ft)
- Frozen: December–April
- Islands: Papinsaari
- ^{1} Shore length is not a well-defined measure.

Ukonvesi is a medium-sized lake in the Vuoksi main catchment area. It is located in the Southern Savonia region in Finland.

== See also ==
- List of lakes in Finland
