= Immalanjärvi =

Lake in South Karelia region, Finland

- Location within Finland
- Coordinates: 61°13′N 28°55′E
- Basin countries: Finland
- Surface area: 19.957 km^{2} (7.705 sq mi)
- Shore length^{1}: 45.07 km (28.01 mi)
- Surface elevation: 69.8 m (229 ft)
- Frozen: December–April
- Settlements: Imatra
- ^{1} Shore length is not a well-defined measure.

Immalanjärvi is a medium-sized lake of Finland. It is situated between Imatra and Ruokolahti settlements in South Karelia. It belongs to the Vuoksi main catchment area. It is situated very close to the Finnish-Russian border, and the eastern part of the lake is on the Russian side.

== History ==
Archaeological findings indicate that the shores of Immalanjärvi have been inhabited since the 4000s BCE. Artifacts such as fragments of clay pots, burnt bones, and stone tools have been discovered, shedding light on the daily lives of ancient communities that once resided in the area.

== See also ==
- List of lakes in Finland
