= Viheri =

Lake in Joutsa, Finland

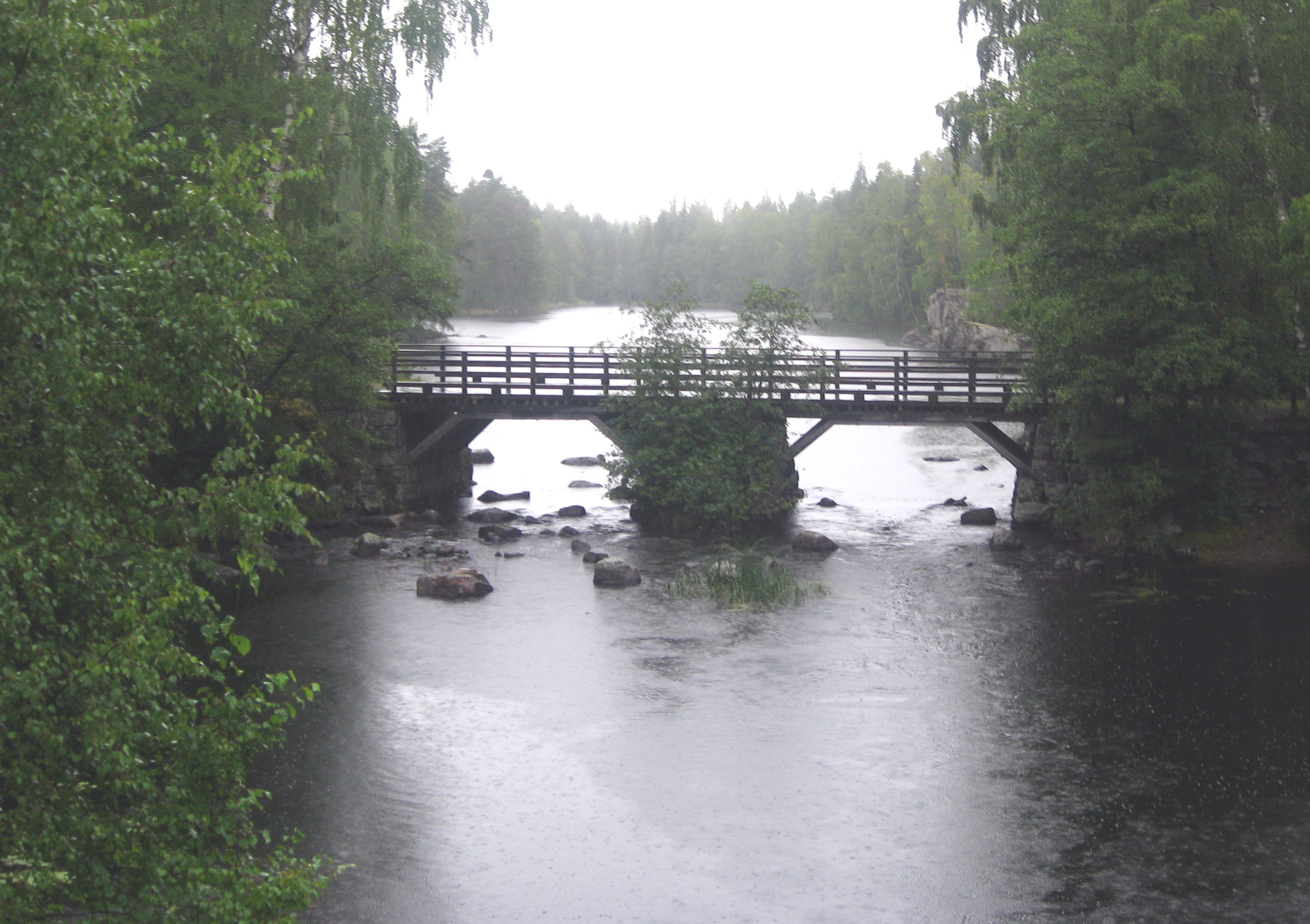
- Bridge, Viheri

- Location within Finland
- Coordinates: 61°43′N 26°11′E
- Basin countries: Finland
- Max. length: 6 km (3.7 mi)
- Max. width: 1 km (0.62 mi)
- Surface area: 4.3 km^{2} (1.7 sq mi)
- Average depth: 5.6 m (18 ft)
- Max. depth: 37.5 m (123 ft)

Viheri is a lake. It is located in the area of Joutsa municipality, in the Central Finland region in Finland. It is an almost totally open water area, with only a couple small islands.
