= Kangasjärvi =

Lake in Isojoki, Finland

- Location within Finland
- Location: Isojoki
- Coordinates: 62°9′50″N 22°0′20″E
- Basin countries: Finland

Kangasjärvi is a small clear lake in Isojoki, Finland. It has camping ground and a small beach where people can sunbathe, swim or fish during the summer, though a wetsuit is recommended in cooler weather. There is also a sauna, shop and accommodation services available. In winter ice fishing and winter swimming is possible.

== Fish ==
Kangasjärvi have numerous whitefish, but there are also perches, pikes, graylings and eels.

== See also ==
- Kangasjärven leirintäalue
- Isojoen Kalastuskunta
- Isojoki
