= Hyrynjärvi =

- Location within Finland
- Coordinates: 64°43′N 28°34′E
- Type: Lake
- Catchment area: Oulujoki
- Basin countries: Finland
- Surface area: 18.016 km^{2} (6.956 sq mi)
- Average depth: 6.18 m (20.3 ft)
- Max. depth: 23.52 m (77.2 ft)
- Water volume: 0.111 km^{3} (90,000 acre⋅ft)
- Shore length^{1}: 48.51 km (30.14 mi)
- Surface elevation: 156.4 m (513 ft)
- Frozen: November–May
- Islands: Vuorisaari
- ^{1} Shore length is not a well-defined measure.

Hyrynjärvi is a medium-sized lake of Finland. It is situated in Kainuu region and in Hyrynsalmi municipality. Vuorisaari island, about 30 meters high, is located in the lake, being famous place, including signs from Stone Age.
