= Kevatoinen =

Lake in Konnevesi, Finland

- Location within Finland
- Location: Konnevesi
- Coordinates: 62°47′35″N 26°19′48″E
- Catchment area: 14.42 km^{2} (5.57 sq mi)
- Basin countries: Finland
- Max. length: 2.9 km (1.8 mi)
- Max. width: 1.2 km (0.75 mi)
- Surface area: 76.894 ha (190.01 acres)
- Average depth: 2.71 m (8 ft 11 in)
- Max. depth: 14 m (46 ft)
- Water volume: 0.00208363 km^{3} (0.00049989 cu mi)
- Shore length^{1}: 9.404 km (5.843 mi)
- ^{1} Shore length is not a well-defined measure.

Kevatoinen is a lake in the Konnevesi municipality of central Finland. It is part of the main basin of the Kymi river and is located 64 km north of Jyväskylä and about 300 km north of Helsinki.

The lake has an area of 77 hectares, a coastline length of 9.4 kilometers, an average depth of 14 meters, and an elevation of 101 meters above sea level.
