= Vallonjärvi =

Lake in Valkeakoski, Finland

Coordinates: 61°14′44″N 24°01′21″E

Vallonjärvi is a lake in Valkeakoski, Finland, and it belongs to the Kokemäenjoki water system, which is one of the largest water systems in Finland.

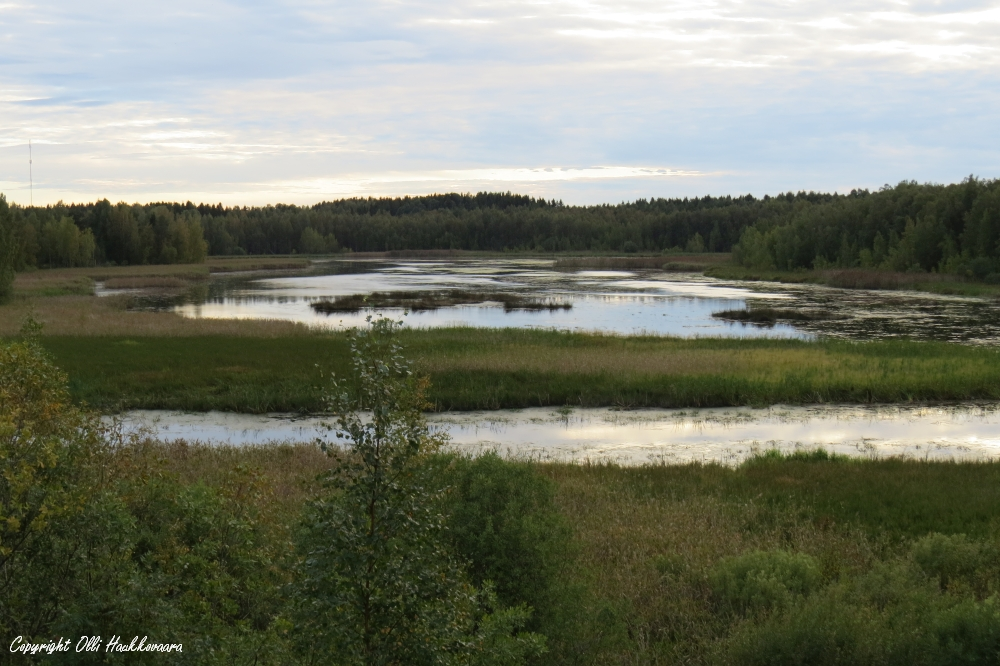
View from north to south from Vallonjärvi bird observation tower

== Geography ==
The lake is 1.1 kilometres (1,200 yd) long and 300 metres (330 yd) wide and covers an area of 25 hectares (62 acres). The lake is located on the southwest side of Valkeakoski town. The River Vallonjoki flows through the northern end of the lake to Yrjölänlahti Bay, which is part of the much larger Vanajavesi lake. The forests on the east side of the lake belong to Heikkilänmetsä nature reserve, where there is a bird observation tower on the shoreline. As a wetland, Vallonjärvi is biologically diverse of all ecosystems, serving as home to a wide range of plant and animal life.
