= List of rivers of Finland =

This is a list of rivers of Finland. Listing begins with rivers flowing into the Baltic Sea, from the north, that is from the Swedish border. Tributaries are listed down the page in an upstream direction.

Water flows from Finland directly to the Baltic Sea, which is divided here into the Gulf of Bothnia, the Gulf of Finland, and the Archipelago Sea between them. Some rivers flow to Russia, eventually ending in either the Gulf of Finland or the White Sea, and a few flow to the Arctic Ocean through Russia or Norway.

There are many lakes in Finland, and this listing also includes several lakes through which the rivers flow or where they begin. Due to the great number of lakes especially in the Finnish Lakeland, where watercourses tend to consist of chains of lakes rather than long rivers, some rivers with a large catchment area can also be quite short, or there may only be a short rapid between large lakes, like for example Tammerkoski in Tampere.

== Rivers flowing to the Gulf of Bothnia ==
- Torne (Swedish: Torne älv, Finnish: Tornionjoki, in Tornio and Haparanda) - border with Sweden
  - Tengeliönjoki (in Aavasaksa)
  - Muonionjoki (Swedish: Muonio älv, near Pajala) - border with Sweden
    - Könkämäeno (Swedish: Könkämäälven, near Kaaresuvanto) - border with Sweden
      - Lätäseno (near Kaaresuvanto)
- Kemijoki (in Kemi)
  - Ounasjoki (in Rovaniemi)
    - Näkkäläjoki (near Hetta)
    - Käkkälöjoki (near Hetta)
  - Raudanjoki (near Oikarainen)
  - flows through lake Kemijärvi
  - Kitinen (near Pelkosenniemi)
    - Luiro (near Pelkosenniemi)
    - Jeesiöjoki (in Sodankylä)
  - Tenniöjoki (near Savukoski) – flows from Russia
    - Kuolajoki (in Salla) – flows from Russia
  - Värriöjoki (in Martti)
- Simojoki (in Simo)
- Iijoki (in Ii)
  - Siuruanjoki (in Yli-Ii)
  - Livojoki (near Pudasjärvi)
- Kiiminkijoki (in Haukipudas)
- Oulujoki (in Oulu)
  - lake Oulujärvi
    - Kiehimänjoki (in Paltamo)
    - Kajaaninjoki (near Kajaani)
- Pyhäjoki (near Pyhäjoki municipality)
- Kalajoki (near Kalajoki municipality)
- Lestijoki (in Himanka)
- Perhonjoki (Swedish: Perho å, in Kokkola)
- Lapuanjoki (Swedish: Lappo å, in Nykarleby)
- Esse å (Finnish: Ähtävänjoki, near Jakobstad)
- Kyrönjoki (Swedish: Kyro älv, near Vaasa)
- Närpes å (Finnish: Närpiönjoki, near Närpes)
- Lappfjärds å (Finnish: Isojoki or Lapväärtinjoki, near Kristinestad)
- Karvianjoki (in Merikarvia and at two different points in Ahlainen, Pori, due to river bifurcation)
- Kokemäenjoki (in Pori)
  - Loimijoki (in Huittinen)
  - lakes Rautavesi and Kulovesi
    - Nokianvirta (in Nokia)
      - Lake Pyhäjärvi (south of Tampere)
        - Tammerkoski (in Tampere)
          - Lake Näsijärvi (north of Tampere)
        - Kuokkalankoski rapids (in Lempäälä)
          - Lake Vanajavesi (between Lempäälä, Valkeakoski and Hämeenlinna)
            - Valkeakoski rapids (in Valkeakoski)
              - Lake Mallasvesi (north of Valkeakoski)
- Eurajoki (in Eurajoki)
- Lapinjoki (in Eurajoki)

== Rivers flowing to the Archipelago Sea ==
- Laajoki (in Mynämäki)
- Mynäjoki (in Mynämäki)
- Aurajoki (in Turku)
- Paimionjoki (in Paimio)
- Halikonjoki (in Halikko, Salo)
- Uskelanjoki (in Salo)
- Perniönjoki (in Perniö, Salo)
  - Kiskonjoki (in Kisko, Salo)

== Rivers flowing to the Gulf of Finland ==
- Svartån (Finnish: Karjaanjoki, in Karis, Raseborg)
- Vantaanjoki (Swedish: Vanda å, in Helsinki)
  - Keravanjoki (in Vantaa)
- Porvoonjoki (Swedish: Borgå å, in Porvoo)
- Kymijoki (in Kotka and near Ruotsinpyhtää)
  - from Päijänne
    - Jämsänjoki (in Jämsä)
      - Könkköjoki (in Petäjävesi)
      - Pengerjoki (in Petäjävesi and Multia)
    - Vaajanvirta (in Jyväskylä) from lake Leppävesi
    - To lake Jyväsjärvi in Jyväskylä, on the same level as Päijänne:
      - Köyhänoja from lake Köhniönjärvi
      - Tourujoki from lake Palokkajärvi
        - Löylyjoki from lake Tuomiojärvi

== Rivers flowing to Russia, to the Gulf of Finland ==
Water from these rivers flows through Lake Ladoga and Neva River to the sea.

- Vuoksi (Russian: Вуокса, in Imatra)
  - lake Saimaa
    - To the interconnected lakes on the same level as Saimaa (for example Lake Pyhäselkä near Joensuu):
      - Höytiäisenkanava (in Joensuu) from lake Höytiäinen
      - Pielisjoki (in Joensuu) from lake Pielinen
        - Koitajoki (near Eno) from lake Koitere, flows partly in Russia
        - from lake Pielinen
          - Lieksanjoki, in Lieksa) from Lake Leksozero (Russian: Лексозеро, Finnish: Lieksajärvi) in Russia, through a chain of lakes
            - Tuulijoki (Russian: Тула) from Lake Tulos (Russian: Тулос, Finnish: Tuulijärvi) in Russia
- Jänisjoki (Russian: Янисйоки, in Värtsilä)
- Tohmajoki (Russian: Тохмайоки, in Tohmajärvi
  - Kiteenjoki (Russian: Китеенъёки), in Kitee
- Hiitolanjoki (Russian: Кокколанйоки), in Rautjärvi

== Rivers flowing to Russia, to the White Sea ==
- Pistojoki (south-east of Kuusamo) - flows to the Kem River in Russia
  - Lakes Muojärvi and Kuusamojärvi in Kuusamo
- Oulankajoki (north-east of Kuusamo) - flows to the Kovda River in Russia
  - Kitkanjoki (near the Russian border) - flows to Oulankajoki in Finland near the Russian border
  - Kuusinkijoki (near the Russian border - flows to Oulankajoki in Russia near the Finnish border
- Tuntsajoki (Russian: Тунтсайоки, in Salla) - flows to the Kovda River in Russia

== Rivers flowing to Russia or Norway, to the Arctic Ocean ==
- Luttojoki (Russian: Лотта) - flows to the Tuloma River in Russia
- Paatsjoki (Norwegian: Pasvikelva, Russian: Паз or Патсойоки) - border between Norway and Russia
  - Lake Inari (Finnish: Inarijärvi)
    - Ivalojoki (near Ivalo)
    - Juutuanjoki (in the village of Inari)
      - Lake Paatari
        - Lemmenjoki
        - Vaskojoki
- Näätämöjoki (Norwegian: Neidenelva) - flows to Norway
- Tana (Finnish: Teno, Norwegian: Tanaelva) - flows to Norway, border between Finland and Norway
  - Utsjoki (near Utsjoki municipality)
  - Inarijoki (Norwegian: Anarjohka) near Karigasniemi) - border between Finland and Norway

== By length ==
This is a list of the rivers, exceeding 100 km, that are wholly or partly located within the borders of Finland.

River	Lengths in km			Notes
River	Within Finland	On border	Total length	Notes
Kemijoki	550		550	
Iijoki	330		330	
Ounasjoki	298		298	Tributary of Kemijoki
Kitinen	278		278	Tributary of Kemijoki
Muonionjoki		230	230	Tributary of Tornionjoki, following the Finnish-Swedish border in its entirety
Luiro	227		227	Tributary of Kemijoki
Kymijoki	180		180	
Tornionjoki		180	522	Border river between Finland and Sweden, partly in Sweden
Simojoki	172		172	
Ivalojoki	170		170	
Kiiminkijoki	170		170	
Pyhäjoki	162		162	
Perhonjoki	155		155	
Tenojoki		152	344	Partly a border river between Finland and Norway, other part is in Norway
Siikajoki	152		152	
Kokemäenjoki	150		150	
Raudanjoki	150		150	Tributary of Kemijoki
Lapuanjoki	147		147	
Porvoonjoki	130		130	
Kalajoki	130		130	
Kyrönjoki	127		127	
Livojoki	125		125	Tributary of Iijoki
Siuruanjoki	120		120	Tributary of Iijoki
Loimijoki	114		114	Tributary of Kokemäenjoki
Karvianjoki	110		110	
Vaskojoki	110		110	
Oulujoki	107		107	
Oulankajoki	105		135	Partly in Russia
Nuorittajoki	105		105	
Kiehimänjoki	105		105	
Paimionjoki	105		105	
Vantaanjoki	101		101	
Lieksanjoki	80		132	Beginning on the Russian side of the border
Tenniöjoki	62		126	Tributary of Kemijoki; about half of its length is in Russia.
Vuoksi	15		150	The majority is on the Russian side of the border.

== See also ==
- Category:Drainage basins of the Baltic Sea
- Category:Drainage basins of the Barents Sea
