= Iijärvi =

Iijärvi is a common name of lakes in Finland. It may refer to

- Lake Iijärvi (Inari) in Inari, Finnish Lapland
- Lake Iijärvi (Kuusamo), North-eastern Finland
- Lake Iijärvi (Suomussalmi), North-eastern Finland
- Lake Iijärvi (Ristijärvi), Kainuu, Finland
- Lake Iijärvi (Sulkava), Finland
