= Lake Iijärvi =

Lake Iijärvi may refer to:

- Lake Iijärvi (Inari)
- Lake Iijärvi (Ristijärvi)
- Lake Iijärvi (Suomussalmi)
