= Vaskojoki =

River in the country of Finland

- Native name: Vaskojoki (Finnish); Fašku (Northern Sami); Vášku (Inari Sami)

Location
- Country: Finland
- Region: Lapland
- Municipality: Inari

Physical characteristics
- Mouth: Lake Paatari
  - coordinates: 68°53′46.7″N 026°38′38.6″E
  - elevation: 144.9 m (475 ft)
- Length: 110 km (68 mi)

Vaskojoki (Northern Sami: Fašku, Inari Sami: Vášku) is a river of Finland. It is located in Lemmenjoki National Park in Inari, Finnish Lapland. Its length is 110 kilometres (68 mi) and it flows into Lake Paatari, which in turn flows through the river Juutuanjoki into Lake Inari, part of the Paatsjoki River basin that flows into the Barents Sea. Various recreational facilities exist in the area, such as rental huts for short-term camping.

== See also ==
- List of rivers of Finland
