= Laurukainen =

Laurukainen (Inari Sami: Lavrukkâš, Skolt Sami: Laarikaž, Laareek, Northern Sami: Lavrukaš, Karelian: Larikka) is a folk hero in Finnish, Sámi and Karelian folklore. In Sámi stories, he has the position of a national hero. He defeats his enemies with cunning instead of physical strength.

Other variants of his name include Laurikainen, Lauri, Lari, Larikainen, Larinen and Valkeapääpoika (Finnish: White-head boy). He has been compared to William Tell.

== Legend ==
Laurukainen's home is attacked by raiders. In Finnish stories, these raiders are Russians or Karelians; in Karelian stories, Russians; and in Sámi stories, Karelians or "Chudes". He is captured and forced to work as a guide to the attackers.

In the most common version, he guides the attackers to stay the night on an island. In the middle of the night, he pushes their boats away and escapes, and the attackers starve on the island. In North Karelian stories, the island in question is Raatosaari in Höytiäinen or an island in Kuohattijärvi lake, while in Kainuu stories, the island is Ärjä in Oulujärvi.

In another version, he tricks the attackers into a dangerous rapid where they drown. This version is mostly known from North Ostrobothnia, Kainuu and Rear Bothnia.

In the third version, which is common among Sámi, the attackers are travelling by skiing or reindeer sleighs. Laurukainen tricks them into sliding down a fell into a ravine by throwing his torch down the cliff, the attackers mistakenly following it. In Skolt Sámi stories, he is able to turn the eyes of the enemies so they start attacking haystacks.
