= Venetjoki Reservoir =

Lake in Finland

- Location within Finland
- Coordinates: 63.535°N 24.233°E
- Type: Reservoir
- Primary inflows: Pahkajoki
- Primary outflows: Kivioja
- Catchment area: Perhonjoki
- Basin countries: Finland
- Surface area: 15.213 km^{2} (5.874 sq mi)
- Shore length^{1}: 63.66 km (39.56 mi)
- Surface elevation: 133.6 m (438 ft)
- ^{1} Shore length is not a well-defined measure.

Venetjoki Reservoir (Finnish: Venetjoen tekojärvi) is a medium-sized lake in the Perhonjoki main catchment area. It is located in the Central Ostrobothnia region in Finland. The purpose of the reservoir is to prevent spring flooding in the lower parts of the river. On the river Perhonjoki there are also two smaller reservoirs, Patana Reservoir and Vissavesi Reservoir.

== See also ==
- List of lakes in Finland
