= Lokka =

Lokka may refer to:

- Alternate form of Loki
- Lokka Tattur
- Lokka Reservoir
- Lokka massacre
- Sven Lokka, Finnish writer and artist
