= Aanaar (restaurant) =

Restaurant in Inari, Finland

Coordinates: 68°54′22″N 027°00′24″E

Restaurant Aanaar is a restaurant in Inari, Finland at the Hotel Kultahovi, which was on the list of the 50 best restaurants in Finland in 2019. The Finnish Gastronomical Society has named it as the restaurant of the year in Finland in 2020. The chef of the restaurant is Heikki Nikula. The hotel and the restaurant are located on the banks of the Juutuanjoki River. Nikula has taken correspondence courses with the Helsinki Culinary School Perho.

== History ==
Hotel Kultahovi ("Gold Court") was founded in 1937. It was closed in September 1944, during the Lapland War, and the Germans burnt it down in November of the same year. A new hotel building was completed in 1956. During 1966–86 the hotel's director was Maija Nikula. She became the owner in 1987, when the Finnish Tourism Association decided to give up the hotel. For the next 20 years, Nikula led the hotel until it was taken over by the next generation. Nikula's daughter Kaisu Nikula became the director, and her brother Heikki Nikula became the chef of the restaurant. The restaurant has been working on the present principles since 2008.

== The restaurant today ==
The restaurant follows a Nordic style, and its models include Noma and Fäviken. It also draws from the Inari Saami tradition and comes up with innovative dishes. It serves local fishes, such as various species belonging to the salmonidae, whitefish and pike, brown trout and arctic charr. Ingredients also include lichen, usnea pine bark, spruce beer, hierochloe and marinated pine cones. For a dessert called "Forest", bark bread is used along with berries, spruce twig granite and boletus edulis ice cream. According to the Finnish Gastronomical Society the unique ingredients are the strength of the restaurant. In addition to the ingredients listed above the restaurant also uses oxyria digyna, angelica archangelica, inonotus obliquus, of which tea is made, and birch leaves, with which sorbet is made. Naturally the restaurant also uses local berries, such as blueberry, lingonberry, cloudberry, mountain ash berries, as well as various local mushrooms and wild herbs.

Some of the ingredients are found right outside the restaurant’s back door, and some from elsewhere in Lapland, some from the Arctic Ocean. "This restaurant has to be located in Inari, somewhere else it would not be the same", says chef Heikki Nikula.

In the restaurant hall there is a TV screen, on which one can see underwater life of the fish in Juutuanjoki River. Aurora borealis can be observed from the restaurant’s windows.
