= Kiehimänjoki =

River in Paltamo, Finland

Coordinates: 64°24′N 27°51′E

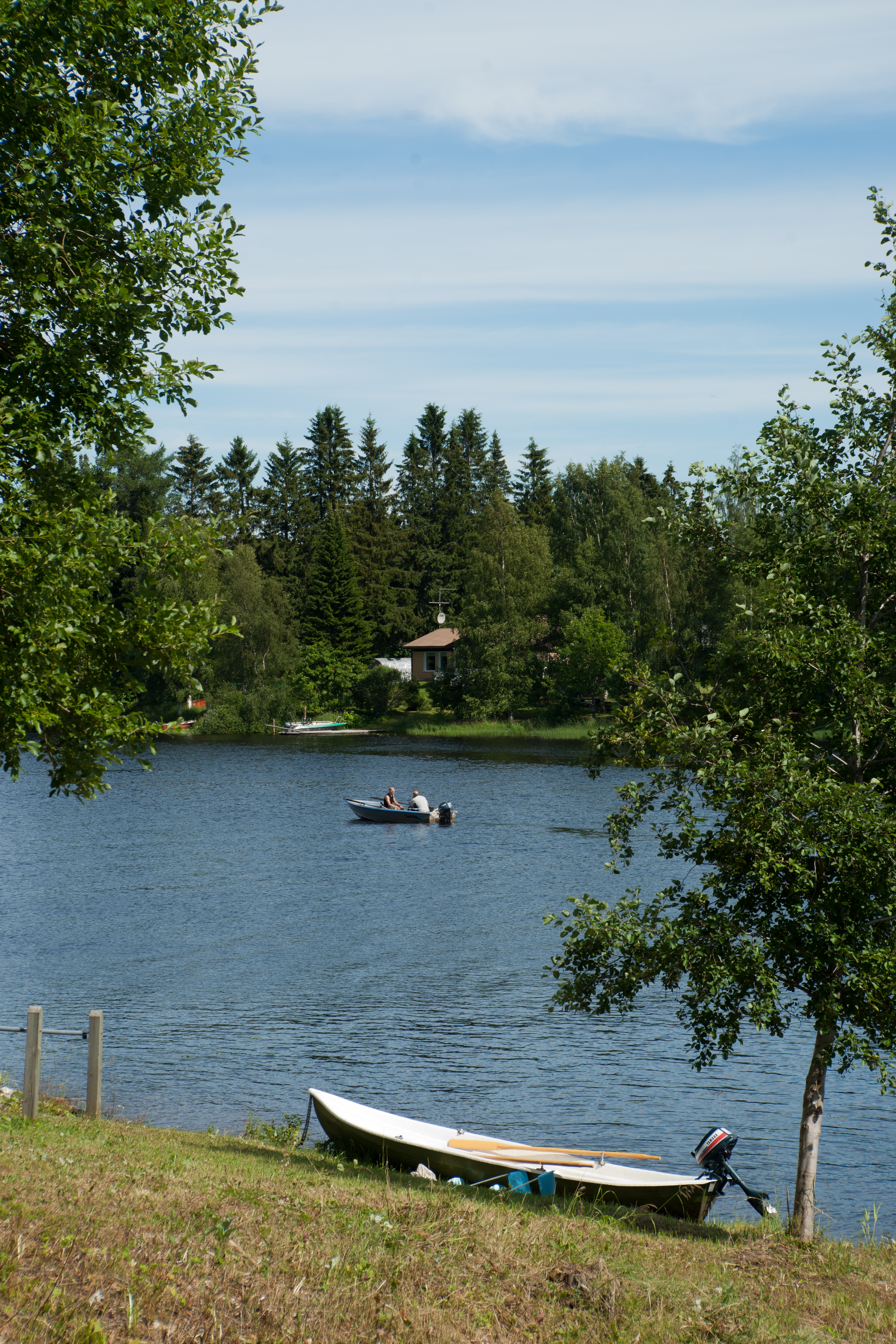
The Kiehimänjoki river

Kiehimänjoki is a river of Finland. It flows for 16 kilometres (10 mi). The river begins from lake Iijärvi in Paltamo in Kainuu region and ends to the lake Oulujärvi, from which the waters flow through the Oulujoki River into the Gulf of Bothnia. The river drains a chain of lakes that originates in the municipalities of Suomussalmi and Hyrynsalmi in Kainuu (Finnish: Hyrynsalmen reitti).

== See also ==
- List of rivers in Finland
