= Tikankaivanto Canal =

Canal in Liperi, Finland

Coordinates: 62°25′20″N 029°42′21″E

Tikankaivanto Canal (Finnish: Tikankaivannon kanava) is a canal between Pyhäselkä and Tikanselkä in Liperi, Finland. It was built in 1972 and its length is over 100 metres (330 ft). Maximum width of ships is 11.8 metres (39 ft) and draft 2.4 metres (7.9 ft).
