= Höytiäisenkanava =

Höytiäisen kanava
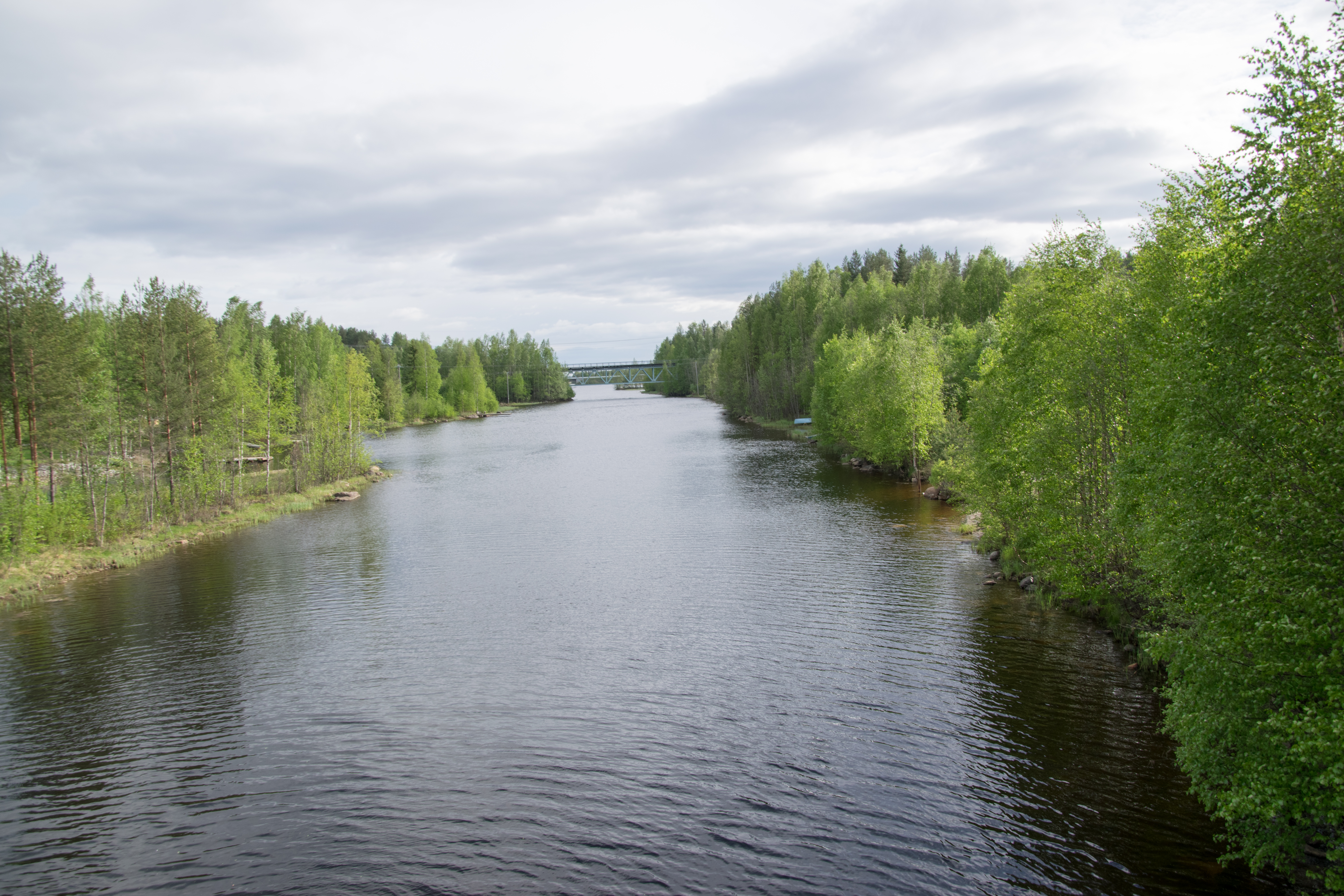

Location
- Country: Finland

Physical characteristics
- Source: Lake Höytiäinen
- Mouth: Lake Pyhäselkä
  - coordinates: 62.6202°N 29.6675°E

Höytiäisen kanava is a river of Finland, or actually an artificial channel that was formed as a result of a mismanaged drainage attempt of the Lake Höytiäinen in Northern Karelia, Finland, in 1859. It flows from the lake Höytiäinen to the Lake Pyhäselkä in Northern Karelia. The river and the adjacent lakes are parts of the Vuoksi River basin in Finland, which in turn is part of Neva basin that flows into the Gulf of Finland in Russia.

== See also ==
- List of rivers of Finland
