= Muojärvi =

Lake in Kuusamo, Finland

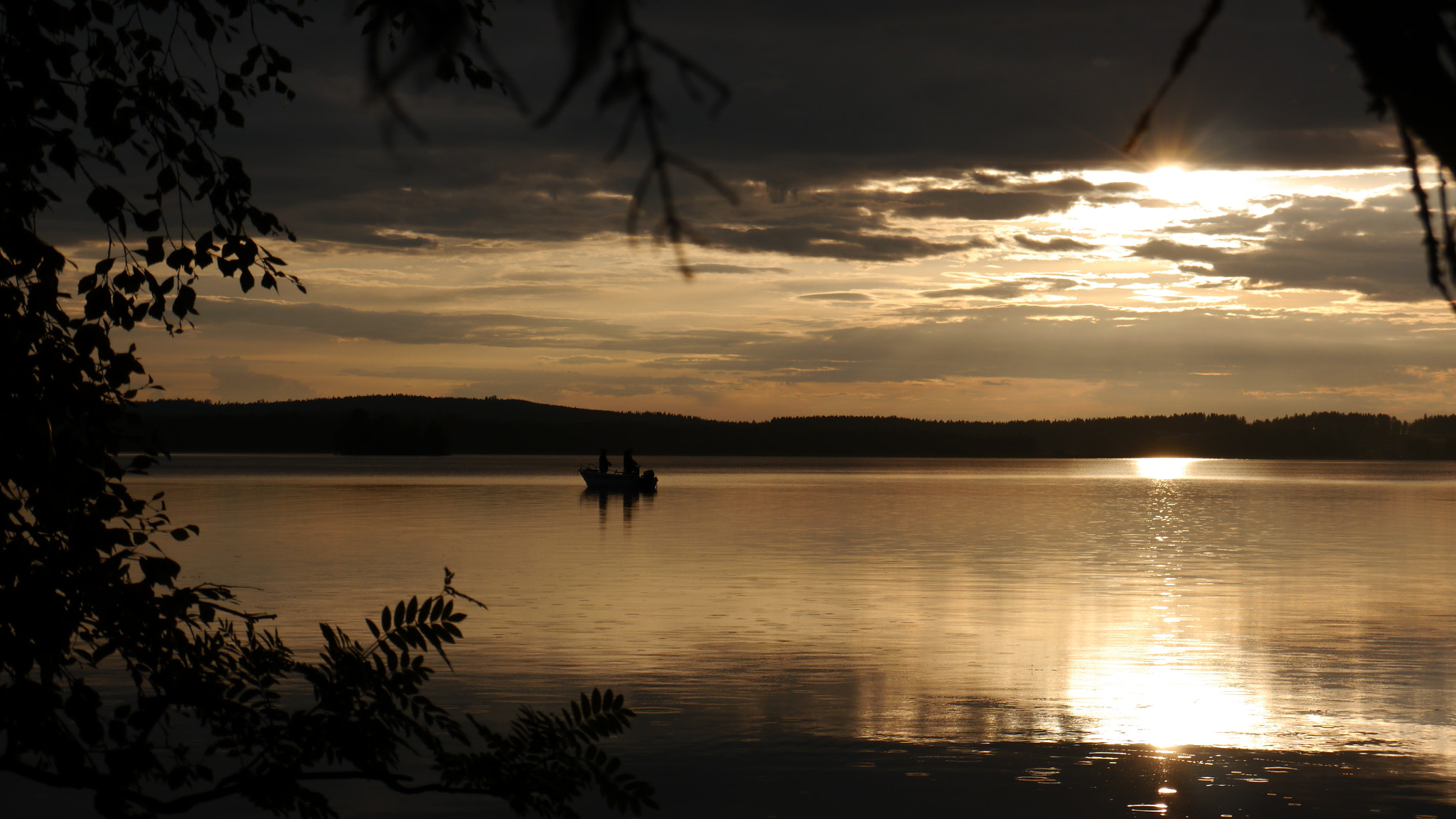
- Interactive map of Muojärvi
- Location: North Ostrobothnia
- Coordinates: 65°56′N 29°43′E
- Basin countries: Finland
- Surface area: 76.16 km^{2} (29.41 sq mi)
- Max. depth: 535 m (1,755 ft)
- Surface elevation: 2,412 m (7,913 ft)

Muojärvi or Muojärvi–Kirpistö is a lake located in Kuusamo, Finland.

The lake has an area of 76.16 square kilometers and an elevation of 253 meters. Lake Muojärvi is a bifurcated lake. Most of it is part of the Kem basin, flows through the Pistojoki river into Lake Joukamojärvi. It is fed by lakes Kirpistö and Kuusamojärvi. In addition, approximately five percent of its waters flow into the Kuusinkijoki waterway, which is part of the Kovda watershed.
