= Korvuanjärvi =

Lake in Finland

- Location within Finland
- Coordinates: 65°22′N 28°38′E
- Primary inflows: river Kontaisenjoki
- Primary outflows: river Särkisensuvanto to the lake Vääräjärvi
- Catchment area: Iijoki
- Basin countries: Finland
- Surface area: 15.403 km^{2} (5.947 sq mi)
- Average depth: 6.03 m (19.8 ft)
- Max. depth: 37 m (121 ft)
- Water volume: 0.0929 km^{3} (75,300 acre⋅ft)
- Shore length^{1}: 43.75 km (27.18 mi)
- Surface elevation: 241.8 m (793 ft)
- ^{1} Shore length is not a well-defined measure.

Korvuanjärvi is a medium-sized lake of Finland. It is situated partly in Taivalkoski municipality in Northern Ostrobothnia region and partly in Suomussalmi municipality in Kainuu region. It belongs to the Iijoki main catchment area.

== See also ==
- List of lakes in Finland
