= Raudanjoki =

Coordinates: 66°28′N 26°05′E

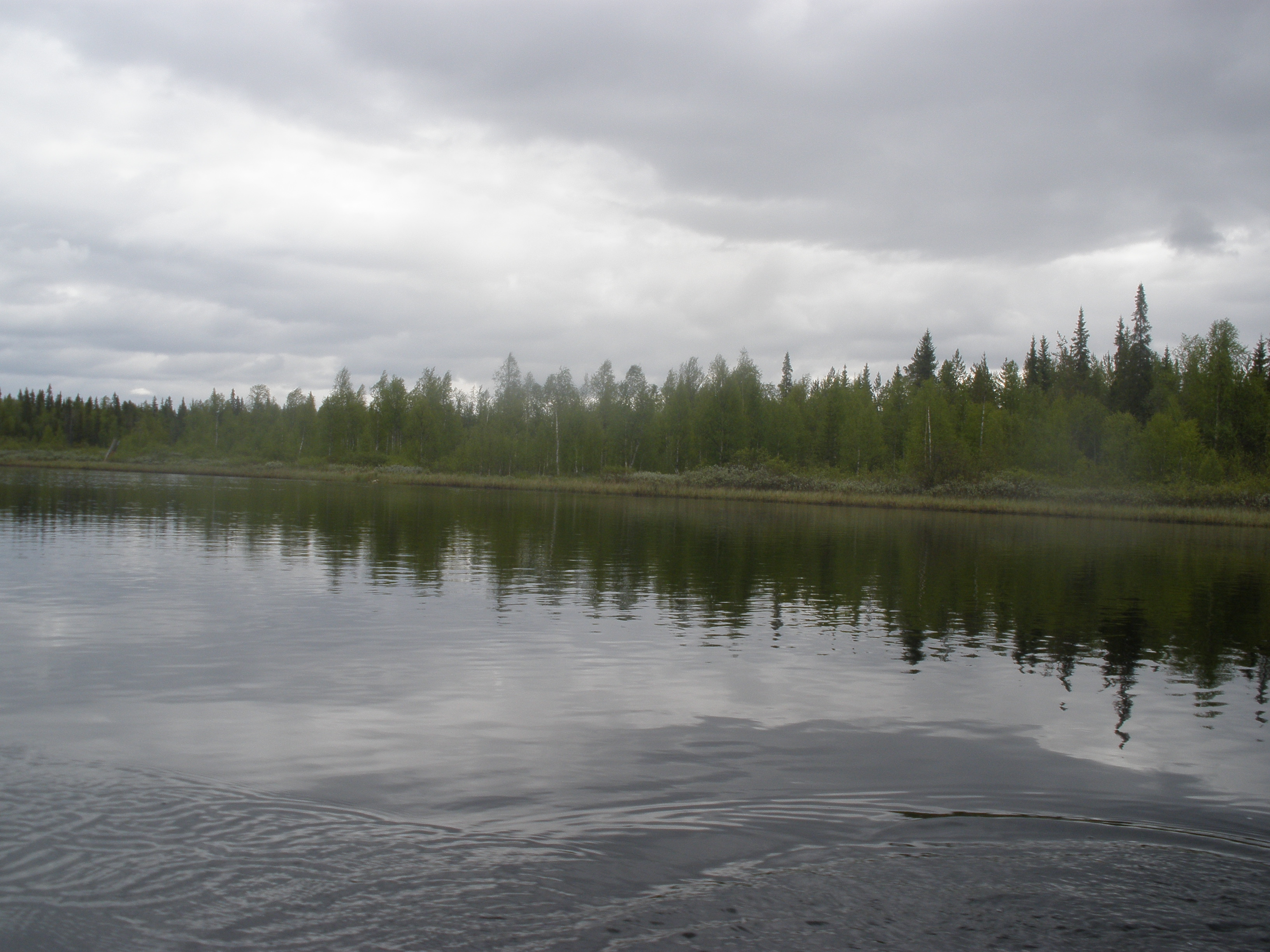

Location
- Country: Finland

Physical characteristics
- Length: 150 km (93 mi)

Raudanjoki is a river in Rovaniemi, Finland. It is a tributary of Kemijoki in Finnish Lapland.

== See also ==
- List of rivers in Finland
