= Kitinen =

Coordinates: 67°08′N 027°29′E

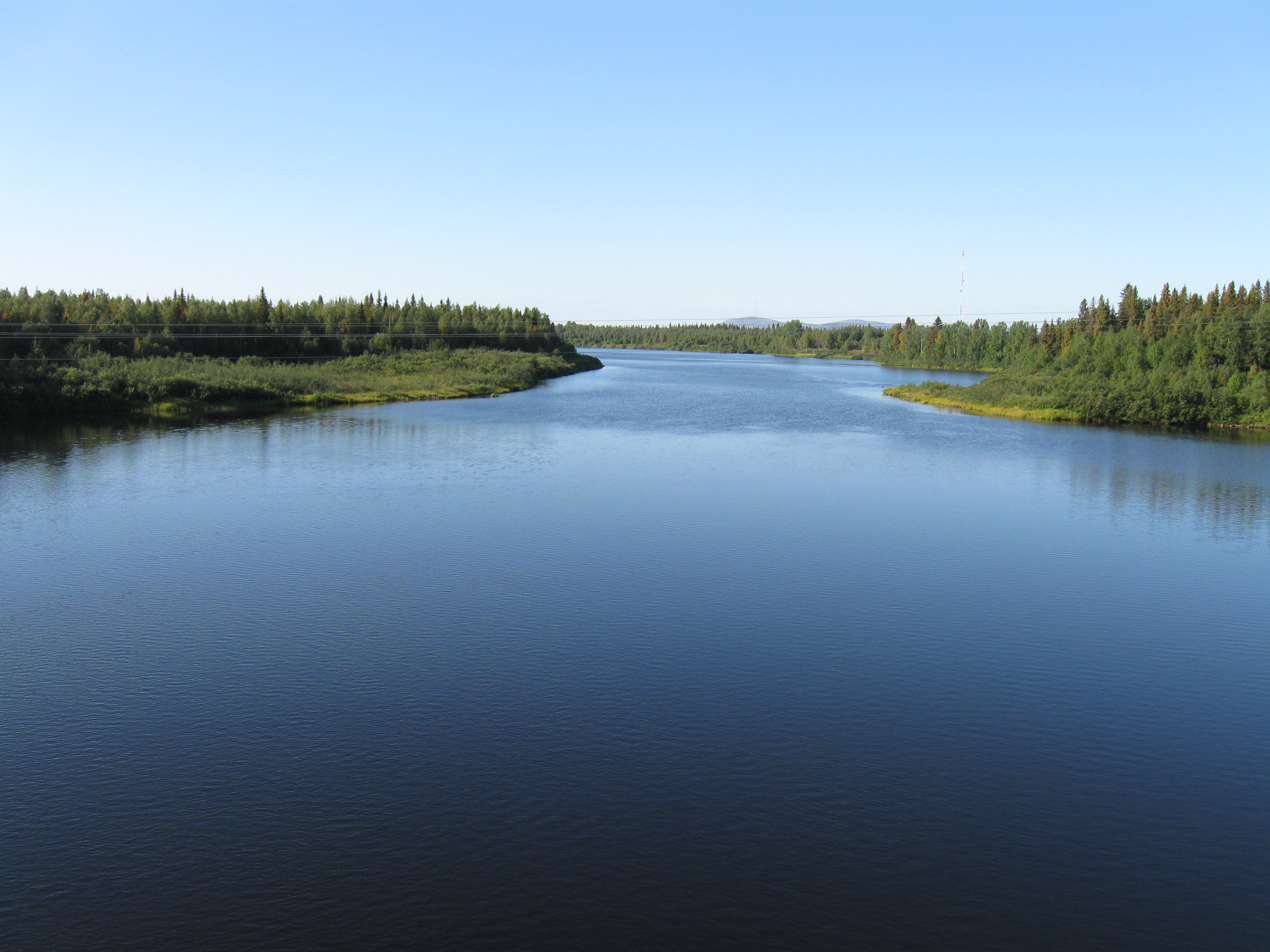
- The Kitinen River in Pelkosenniemi, Finland

Location
- Country: Finland
- Municipality: Kittilä, Pelkosenniemi, Sodankylä

Physical characteristics
- Length: 235 km (146 mi)

Kitinen is a river in Finland. It flows for 235 kilometres (146 mi), making it the fourth longest river in Finland. The river flows through the municipalities of Kittilä, Pelkosenniemi, and Sodankylä in the Finnish region of Lapland. The Porttipahta Reservoir and a hydroelectric power plant are located on the upper course of the river. Tributaries of Kitinen are Kemijoki, Luiro, and Sattanen.

== See also ==
- List of rivers in Finland
