= Tenniöjoki =

River in Finland and Russia

Tenniöjoki Russian: Тенниёйоки
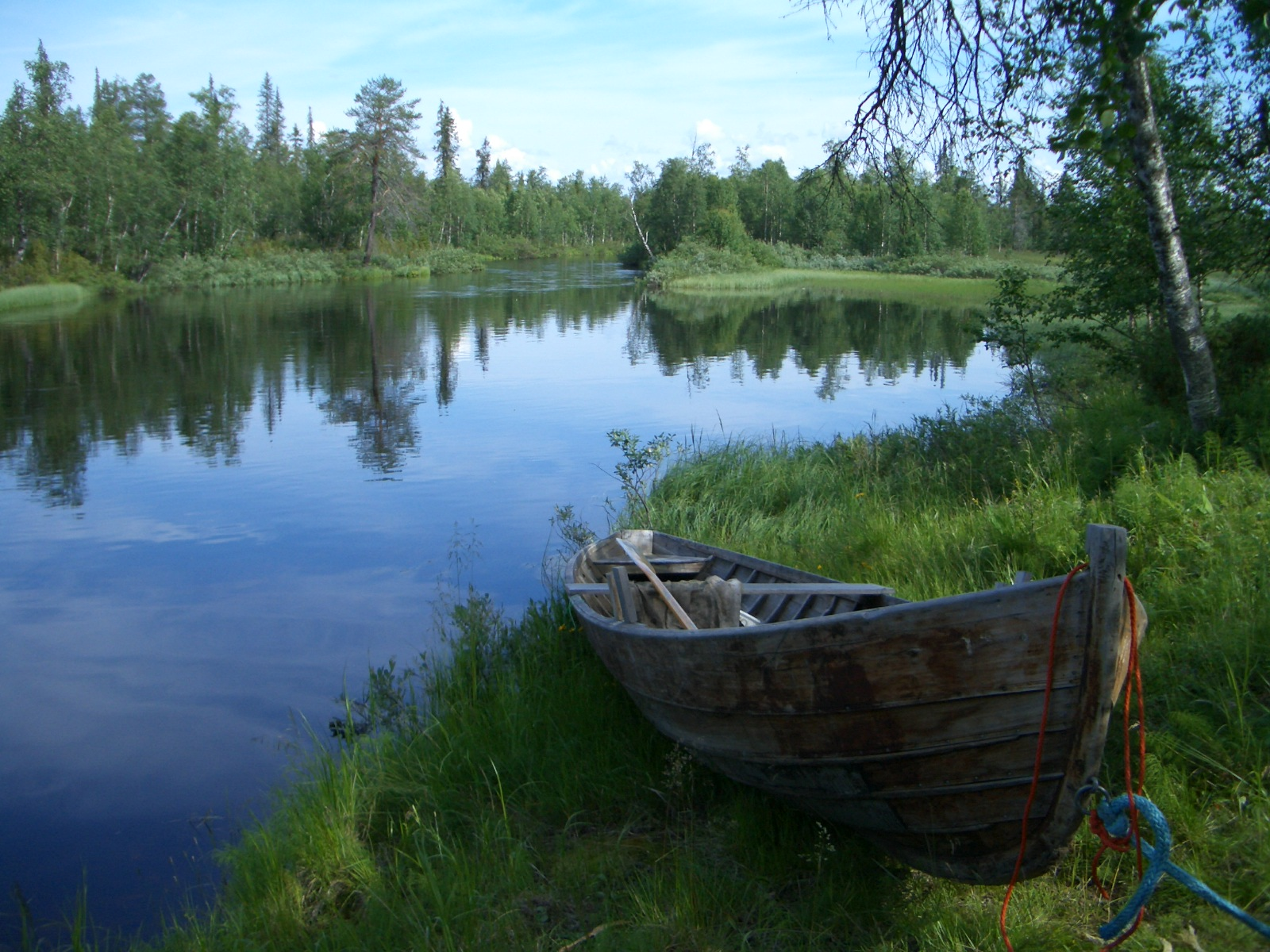
- The Tenniöjoki in Finland

Location
- Countries: Finland; Russia
- Region: Lapland
- Municipality: Salla
- Oblast: Murmansk
- District: Kandalakshskiy

Physical characteristics
- Source
  - location: Minkelimunturi, Russia
  - coordinates: 67.346667°N 29.703889°E
- Mouth
  - location: Finland
  - coordinates: 67.279444°N 28.247222°E
- Length: 73 km (45 mi)
- Basin size: 725 km^{2} (280 sq mi)
- Discharge
  - location: Kemijoki

Basin features
- Progression: Kemijoki→ Gulf of Bothnia

The Tenniöjoki is a river in Russia and Finland. It begins in Murmansk Oblast in Russia from where it flows into Finnish territory in Lapland region. It is a tributary of Kemijoki and one of its tributaries is Kuolajoki which also begins on the Russian side of the border and ends in Finland.

The river is 73 kilometres (45 mi) long and the area of its watershed is 725 square kilometres (280 sq mi). It starts in a swampy area by the slopes of the Minkeliminturi mountain.

== See also ==
- List of rivers in Finland
