= Tengeliönjoki =

River in Finland

Coordinates: 66°23′N 23°42′E

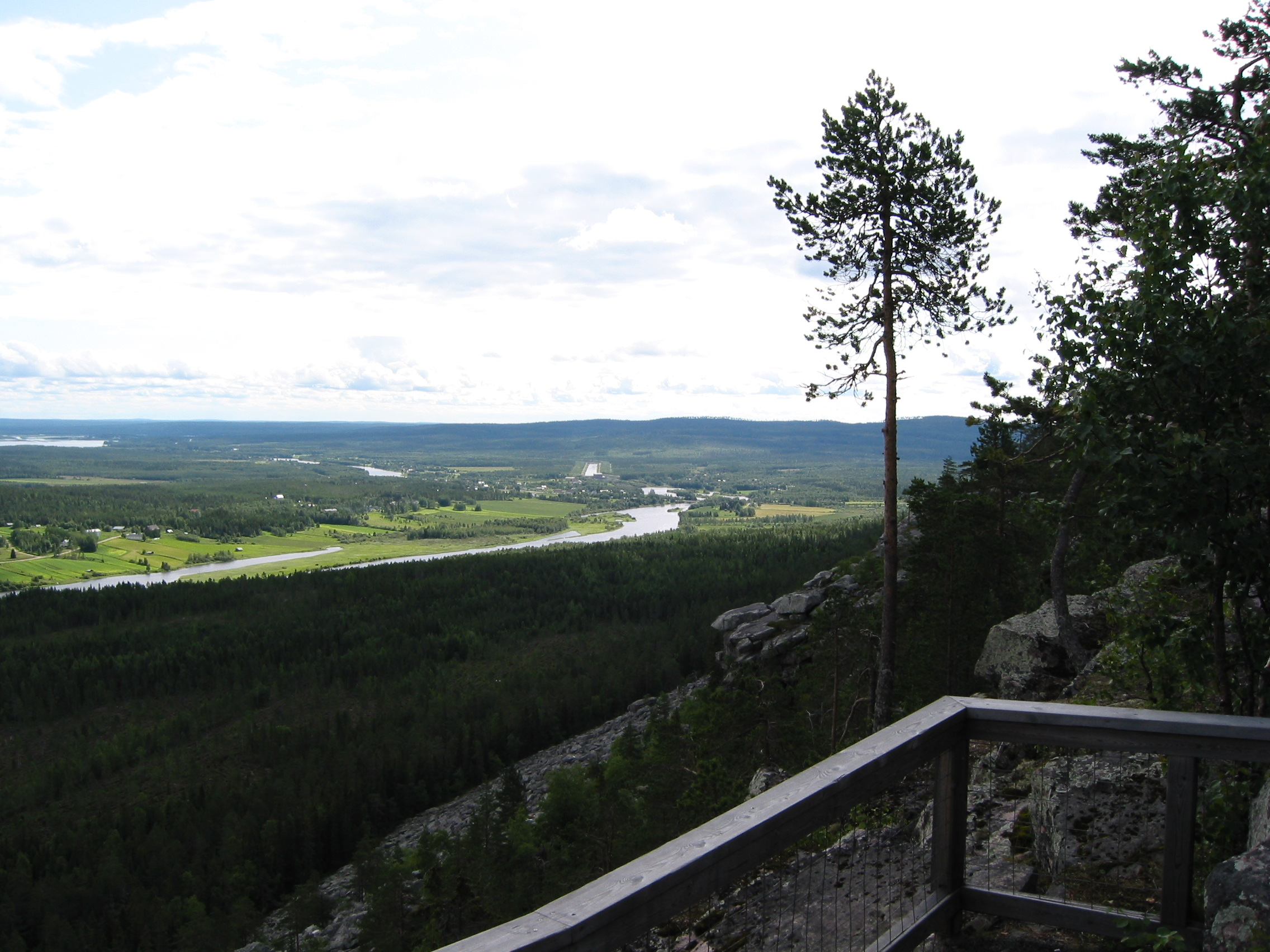

Physical characteristics
- Source
  - location: Miekojärvi
- Mouth
  - location: Torne (Finnish and Swedish river)
- Length: 51 km (32 mi)

Tengeliönjoki is a river of Finland. It is 51 kilometres (32 mi) long. It is a tributary of the Torne in Finnish Lapland.

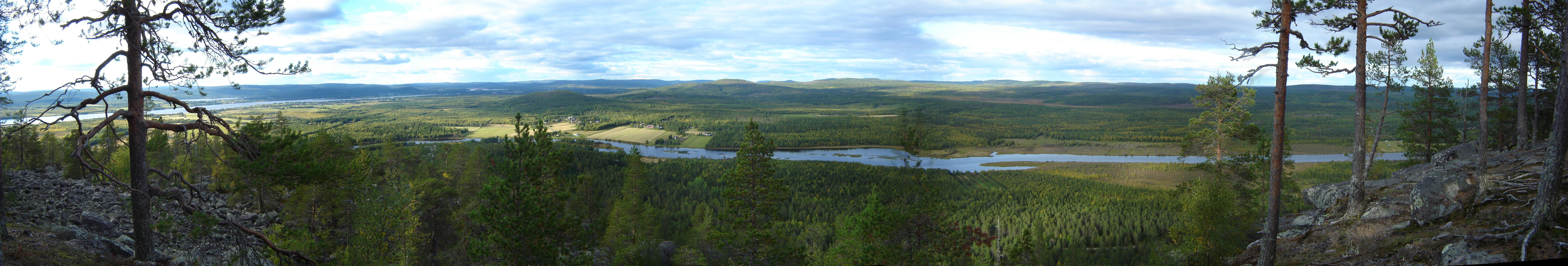
Tengeliönjoki

== See also ==
- List of rivers in Finland
