= Lieksanjoki =

River in the countries of Finland and Russia

Lieksanjoki, Lenderka
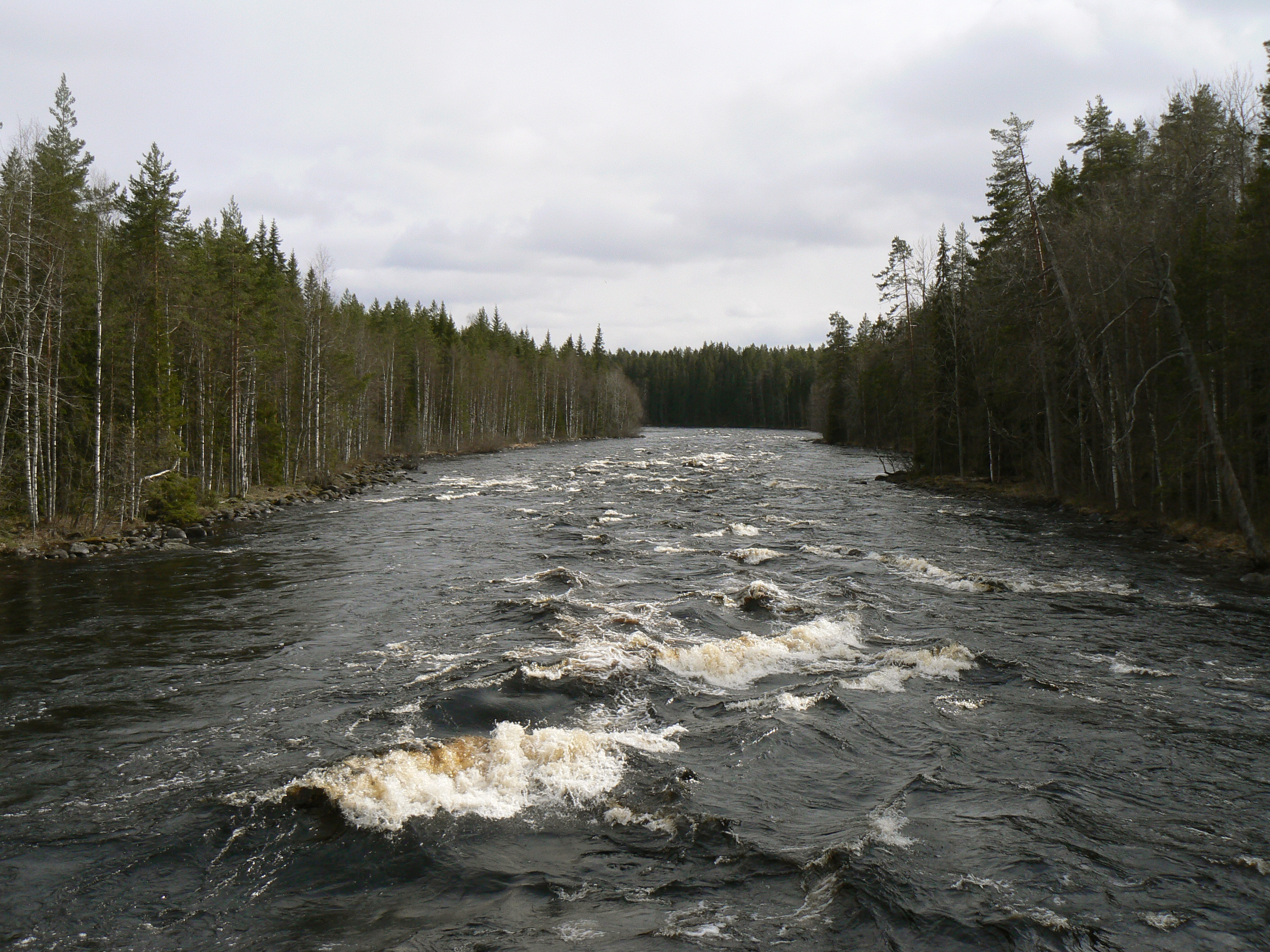

Location
- Countries: Russia; Finland

Physical characteristics
- Source: Lake Sula
- Mouth: Lake Pielinen
  - coordinates: 63.3316°N 30.4642°E

Lieksanjoki or Lenderka (Russian: Лендерка) is a river of Finland and Russia that begins in the Republic of Karelia in Russia. It flows into the Lake Pielinen in Northern Karelia, Finland. Parts of its basin in Russia are the lakes Lake Leksozero and Lake Tulos in the Republic of Karelia. The river itself is a part the Vuoksi River basin in Finland and Russia, which in turn is a part of the Neva basin in Russia.

== See also ==
- Lieksa
- List of rivers of Finland
