= Siuruanjoki =

Coordinates: 65°22′N 25°51′E

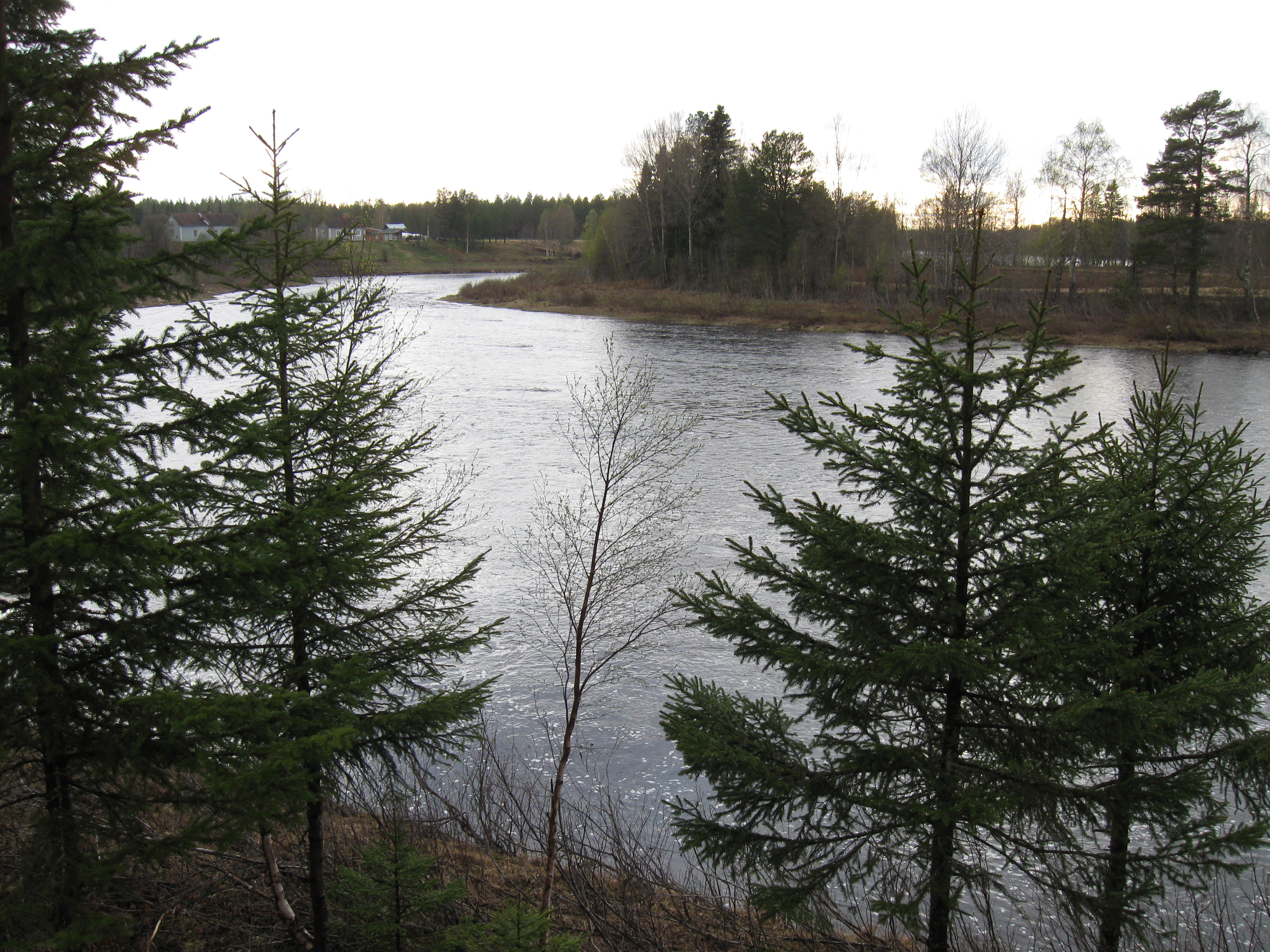

Location
- Country: Finland

Physical characteristics
- Length: 155 km (96 mi)

Siuruanjoki is a river of Finland. It is a most western notable tributary of the Iijoki.

== See also ==
- List of rivers in Finland
