= Pieni Laitasaari =

Island in North Karelia, Finland

Geography
- Coordinates: 62.45288°N 29.61245°E
- Area: 0.02 km^{2} (0.0077 sq mi)

Administration
- Finland
- City: Joensuu
- Municipality: Liperi
- Region: North Karelia

Pieni Laitasaari is an island in Finland. It is located in Lake Pyhäselkä and in the municipality of Liperi in the economic region Joensuu economic region and the province of North Karelia, in the southeastern part of the country, 300 km northeast of the capital Helsinki.
