= Lokka Reservoir =

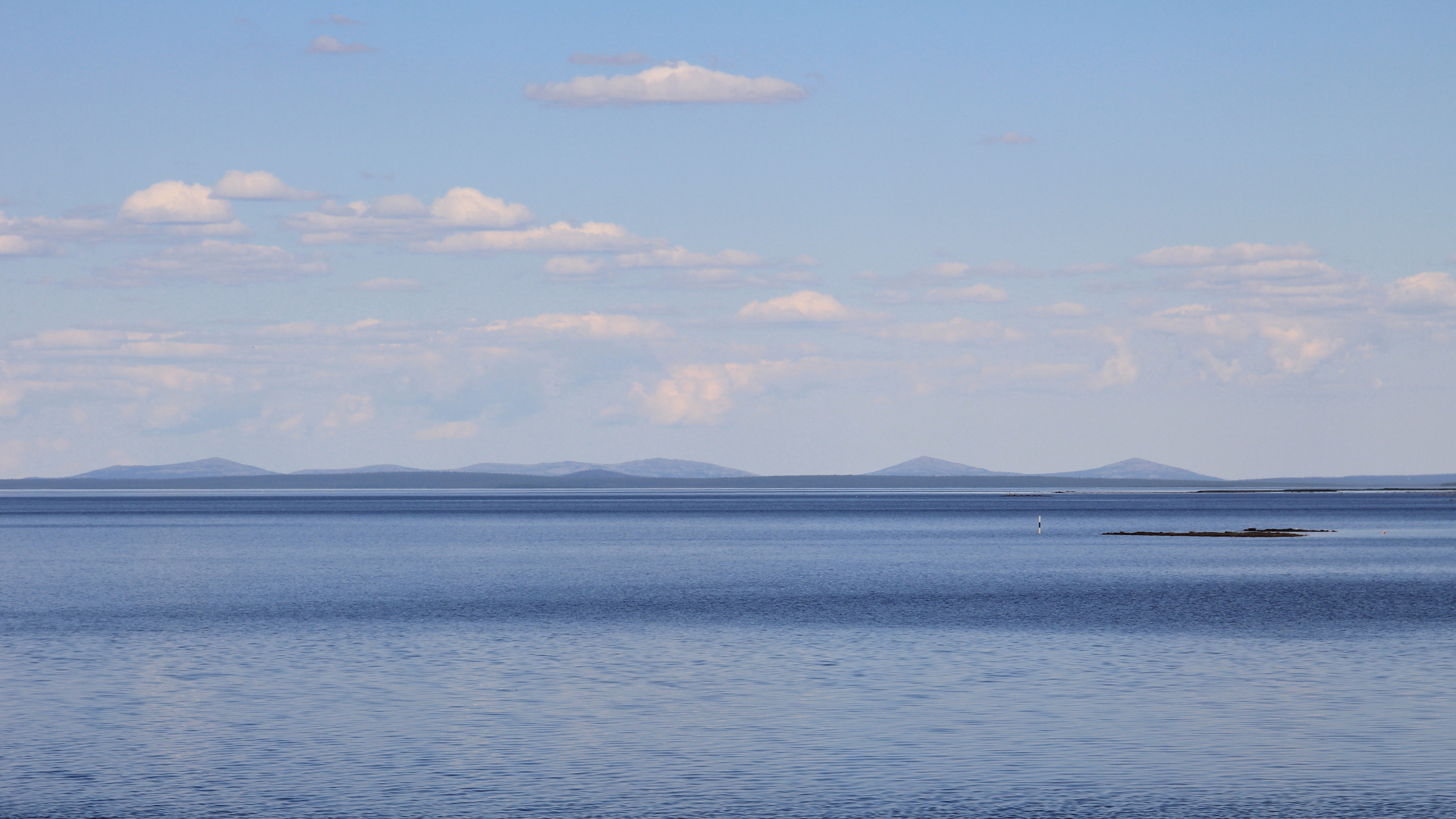
- Lokka reservoir seen from embankment dam in Lokka village.

- Location within Finland

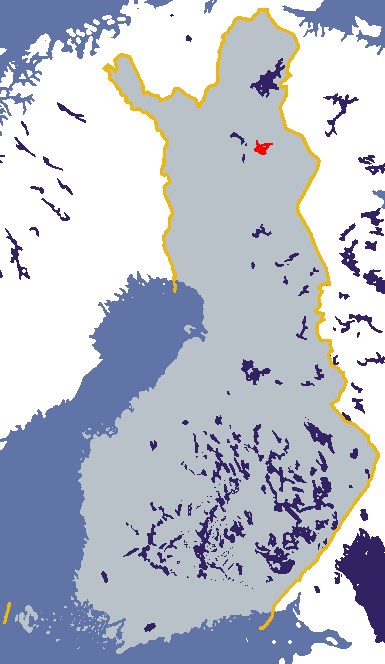
- Location of the lake in Finland
- Location: Sodankylä
- Coordinates: 67°49′12″N 27°45′00″E
- Type: reservoir
- Primary inflows: Luiro
- Primary outflows: Luiro
- Basin countries: Finland
- Surface area: 216–418 km^{2} (83–161 sq mi)
- Surface elevation: 240–245 m (787–804 ft)

The Lokka Reservoir (in Finnish: Lokan tekojärvi, Lokan allas, short form Lokka), is a reservoir, upstream of the Luiro River in Sodankylä, in northern Finland. Depending on the water level, its area ranges from 216 to 418 km². The corresponding water levels above mean sea level are 240–245 meters. The filling of the reservoir Lokka began in 1967, and with this reservoir, the amount of water coming to the power plants in Kemijoki could be regulated. Lokka has also been famous for its rich fish population. There are also populations of white-tailed eagles at the reservoir. These do not migrate south for the winter, instead they stay at Lokka to feed on fish left by local fishermen.

Lokka is connected to the Porttipahta Reservoir through the Vuotso Canal.

== Climate ==
Lokka has a Subarctic climate (Köppen: Dfc) with long, severely cold winters and short, mild summers.

Climate data for Sodankylä Lokka, 1991-2020 normals, extremes 1959-present
Month	Jan	Feb	Mar	Apr	May	Jun	Jul	Aug	Sep	Oct	Nov	Dec	Year
Record high °C (°F)	5.4 (41.7)	5.6 (42.1)	8.8 (47.8)	16.5 (61.7)	27.1 (80.8)	31.5 (88.7)	30.8 (87.4)	30.3 (86.5)	21.8 (71.2)	14.5 (58.1)	9.7 (49.5)	6.4 (43.5)	31.5 (88.7)
Mean maximum °C (°F)	0.7 (33.3)	1.0 (33.8)	4.0 (39.2)	9.9 (49.8)	19.1 (66.4)	23.9 (75.0)	25.5 (77.9)	23.6 (74.5)	17.0 (62.6)	8.9 (48.0)	3.1 (37.6)	1.7 (35.1)	26.6 (79.9)
Mean daily maximum °C (°F)	−8.5 (16.7)	−8.4 (16.9)	−3.5 (25.7)	2.3 (36.1)	8.6 (47.5)	15.3 (59.5)	18.8 (65.8)	16.0 (60.8)	10.0 (50.0)	2.2 (36.0)	−3.3 (26.1)	−6.2 (20.8)	3.6 (38.5)
Daily mean °C (°F)	−12.7 (9.1)	−12.5 (9.5)	−8.3 (17.1)	−2.1 (28.2)	4.0 (39.2)	10.6 (51.1)	14.1 (57.4)	11.6 (52.9)	6.5 (43.7)	−0.2 (31.6)	−6.3 (20.7)	−10.0 (14.0)	−0.4 (31.3)
Mean daily minimum °C (°F)	−17.7 (0.1)	−17.6 (0.3)	−14 (7)	−7.2 (19.0)	−0.4 (31.3)	6.0 (42.8)	9.2 (48.6)	7.0 (44.6)	2.7 (36.9)	−3.1 (26.4)	−9.9 (14.2)	−14.5 (5.9)	−5.0 (23.0)
Mean minimum °C (°F)	−34.2 (−29.6)	−33.5 (−28.3)	−29.6 (−21.3)	−21.6 (−6.9)	−8.4 (16.9)	−0.4 (31.3)	2.4 (36.3)	−1.1 (30.0)	−5.2 (22.6)	−15.6 (3.9)	−24.0 (−11.2)	−30.4 (−22.7)	−36.5 (−33.7)
Record low °C (°F)	−48 (−54)	−48 (−54)	−41.4 (−42.5)	−31.5 (−24.7)	−21.8 (−7.2)	−4.0 (24.8)	−2.4 (27.7)	−6.6 (20.1)	−17.4 (0.7)	−30 (−22)	−35.2 (−31.4)	−40.6 (−41.1)	−48 (−54)
Average precipitation mm (inches)	37 (1.5)	33 (1.3)	31 (1.2)	31 (1.2)	41 (1.6)	59 (2.3)	69 (2.7)	58 (2.3)	54 (2.1)	49 (1.9)	45 (1.8)	42 (1.7)	549 (21.6)
Average precipitation days (≥ 0.1 mm)	19	17	15	14	14	14	16	15	15	18	20	20	197
Source 1: FMI normals for Finland 1991-2020
Source 2: Record highs and lows
