= Kyrönjoki =

River of Finland

Coordinates: 63°13′N 021°46′E

Kyrönjoki Kyro älv
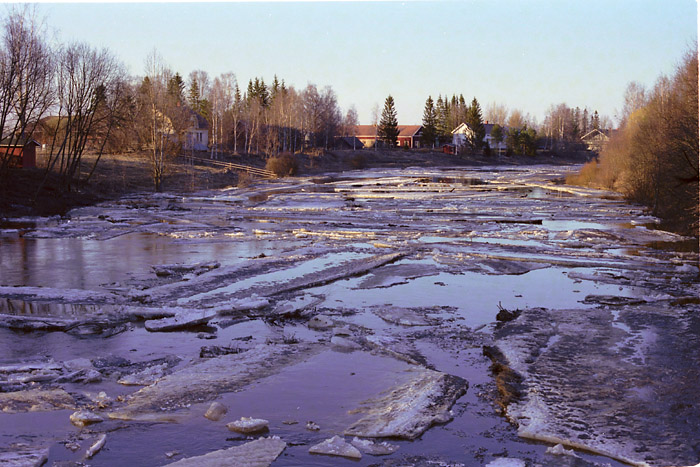

Location
- Country: Finland

Physical characteristics
- Length: 80 - 200 km

Kyrönjoki (Swedish: Kyro älv) is a river of Finland. It is located in Southern Ostrobothnia region and flows into the Gulf of Bothnia.

By the river is the Nikkola and Pirilä riverside settlement that is a cultural heritage site of national significance.

== See also ==
- List of rivers of Finland
