= Miekojärvi =

Lake in Pello and Ylitornio, Finland

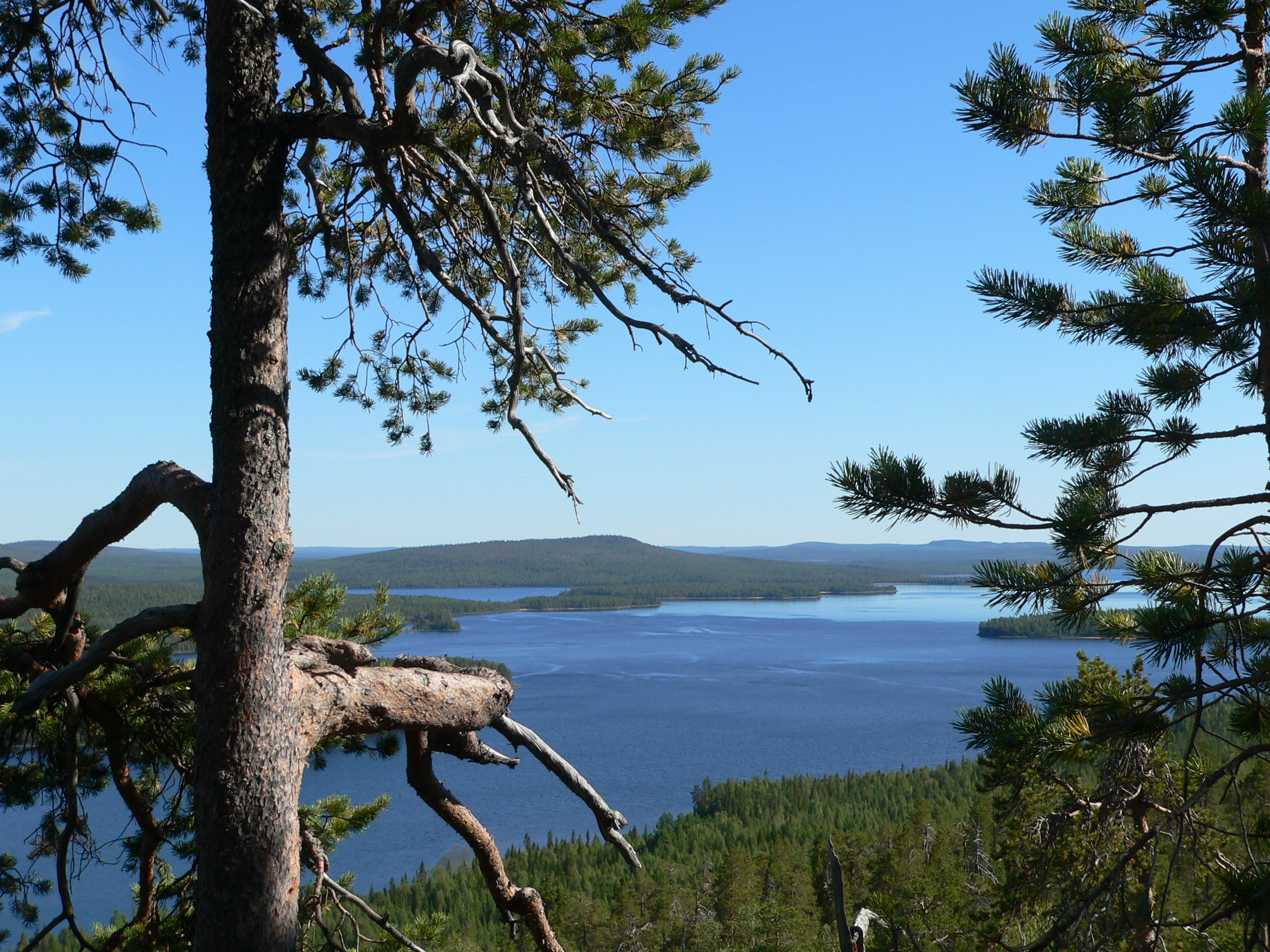

- Location within Lapland
- Coordinates: 66°36′N 24°23′E
- Catchment area: Tornionjoki
- Basin countries: Finland
- Surface area: 53.339 km^{2} (20.594 sq mi)
- Max. depth: 22.84 m (74.9 ft)
- Water volume: 0.349 km^{3} (283,000 acre⋅ft)
- Shore length^{1}: 107.7 km (66.9 mi)
- Surface elevation: 76.9 m (252 ft)
- Frozen: November–May
- Islands: Vaarasaari, 8.43 km^{2}
- Settlements: Pello, Ylitornio
- ^{1} Shore length is not a well-defined measure.

Miekojärvi is medium-sized lake in the Tornionjoki main catchment area in Finland. It is located in Pello and Ylitornio municipalities, in the western Lapland region. Miekojärvi flows through Tengeliönjoki to Torne (Finnish and Swedish river).

== See also ==
- List of lakes in Finland
