= Luiro =

Coordinates: 67°10′N 27°30′E

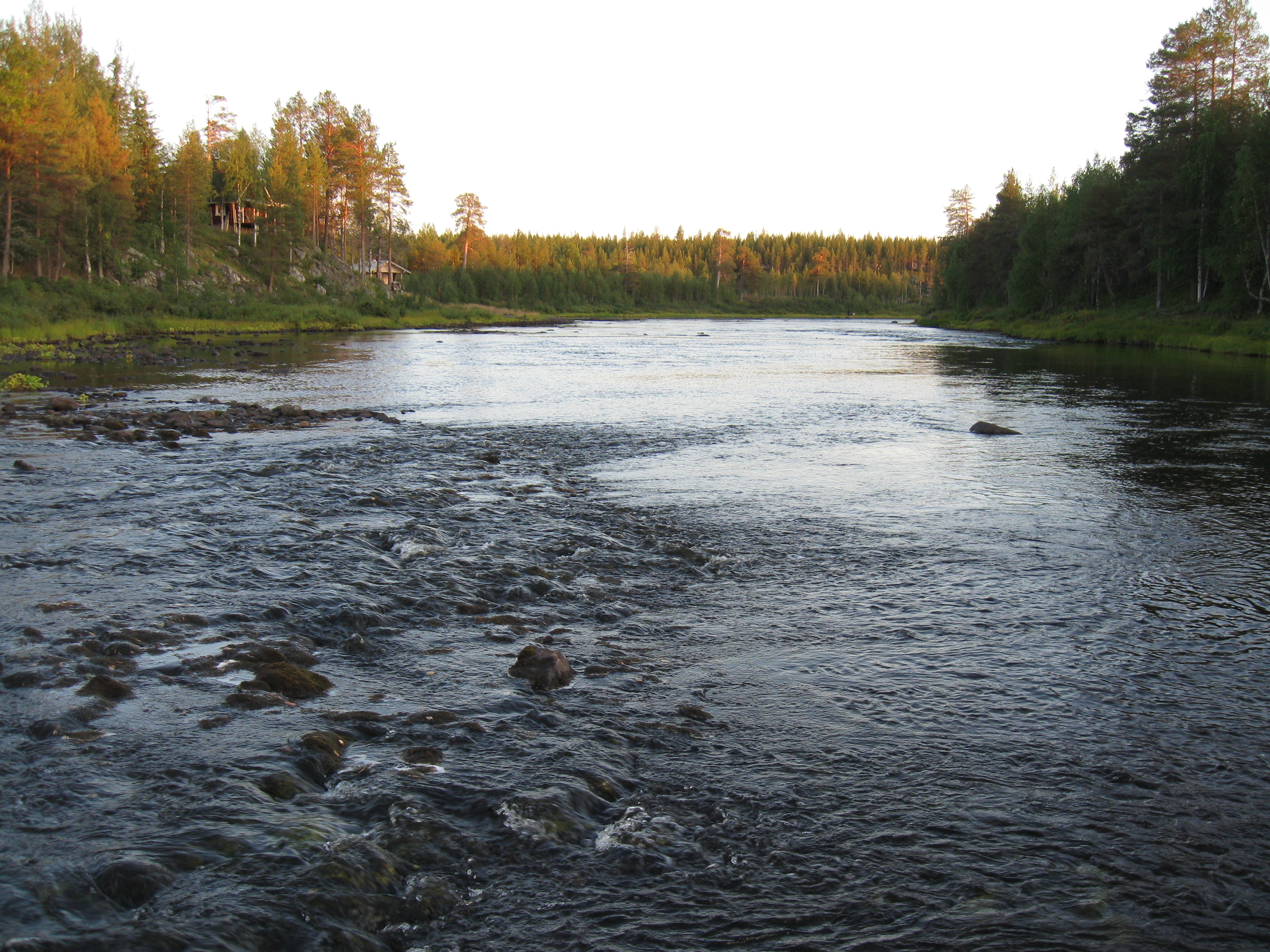

Location
- Country: Finland

Luiro is a river of Finland. It is a tributary of Kitinen, that itself is a tributary of Kemijoki. The river flows through the municipalities of Sodankylä, Savukoski and Pelkosenniemi in Finnish Lapland. The Lokka Reservoir is located in the middle course of the river.

== See also ==
- List of rivers in Finland
