= Lake Paatari =

Lake in the country of Finland

- Location within Finland
- Location: Inari, Finland
- Coordinates: 68°51′30″N 026°33′00″E
- Primary inflows: Lemmenjoki, Vaskojoki
- Primary outflows: Matkatjoki
- Basin countries: Finland
- Max. length: 9 km (5.6 mi)
- Surface area: 20.5 km^{2} (7.9 sq mi)
- Shore length^{1}: 47.1 km (29.3 mi)
- Surface elevation: 144.9 m (475 ft)
- Settlements: Inari
- ^{1} Shore length is not a well-defined measure.

Lake Paatari is a lake in the Inari municipality, Lapland region, Finland. It drains through the Matkatjoki river into Solojärvi. Its main inflows are the rivers Lemmenjoki and Vaskojoki.
