= Joukamojärvi =

- Location within Finland
- Location: Kuusamo
- Coordinates: 65°53′N 29°54′E
- Type: Lake
- Catchment area: Koutajoki
- Basin countries: Finland
- Surface area: 24.487 km^{2} (9.454 sq mi)
- Average depth: 3.17 m (10.4 ft)
- Max. depth: 15.53 m (51.0 ft)
- Water volume: 0.0776 km^{3} (62,900 acre⋅ft)
- Shore length^{1}: 131.44 km (81.67 mi)
- Surface elevation: 252.2 m (827 ft)
- Frozen: December–May
- Islands: Räisäsensaari, Ontreinsaari
- ^{1} Shore length is not a well-defined measure.

Joukamojärvi is a medium-sized lake in the Koutajoki main catchment area. It is located in Kuusamo municipality, in the region Northern Ostrobothnia in Finland.

== See also ==
- List of lakes in Finland
