= Kuolajoki =

River in the countries of Finland and Russia

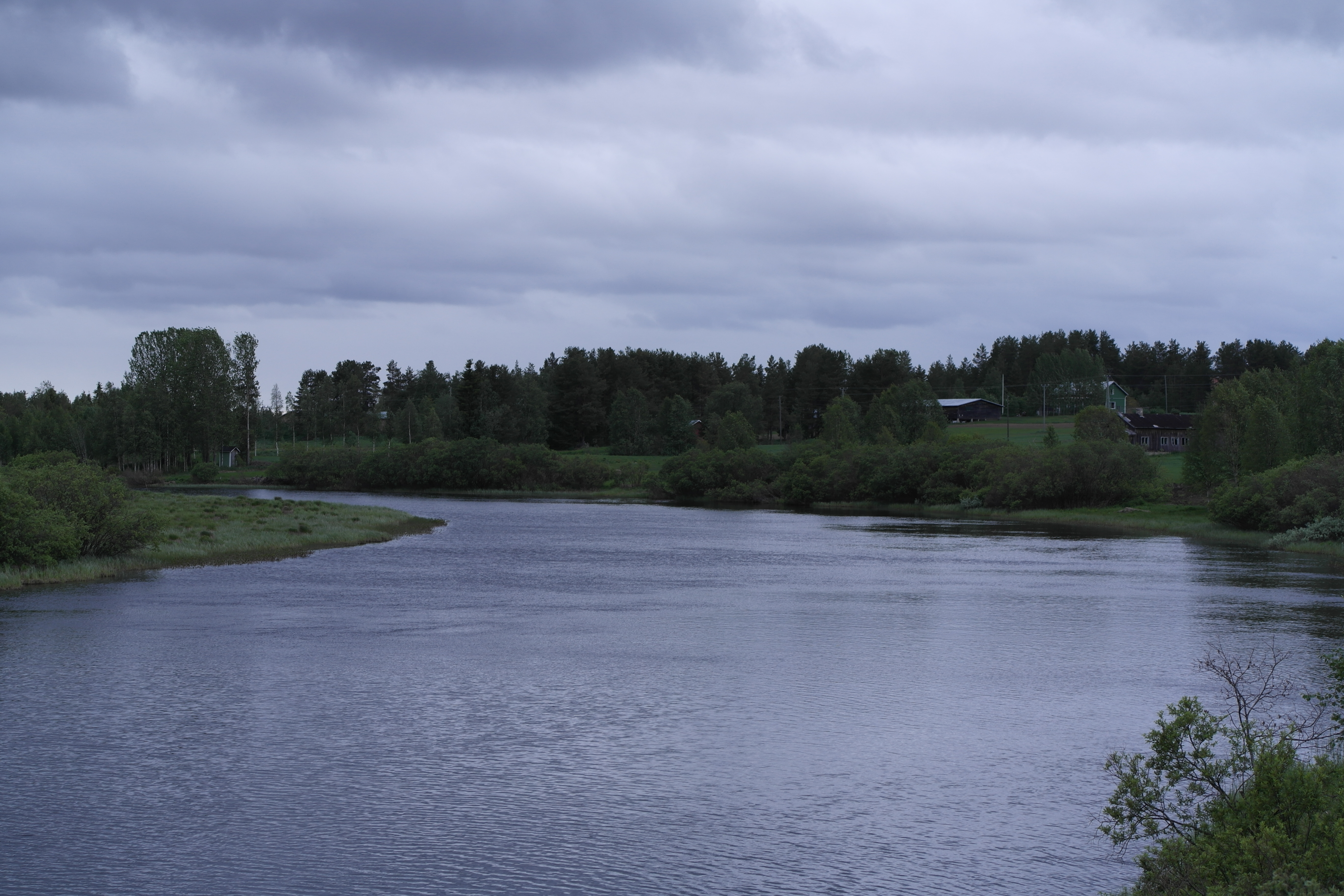
- Kuolajoki in Kotala, Salla, Finland
- Native name: Куолайоки (Russian)

Location
- Countries: Russia; Finland
- Region: Murmansk Oblast, Lapland (Finland)

Physical characteristics
- Source: Lake Kuolayarvi
  - elevation: 207 m (679 ft)
- Mouth: Tenniöjoki
  - coordinates: 67.1049°N 28.8173°E
- Length: 30 km (19 mi)
- Basin size: 1,635 km^{2} (631 sq mi)

Basin features
- Progression: Tenniöjoki→ Kemijoki→ Gulf of Bothnia

The Kuolajoki (Russian: Куолайоки, Finnish: Kuolajoki) is a river in Murmansk Oblast, Russia and in Lapland, Finland. It is 30 kilometres (19 mi) long. The area of its basin is 1,635 square kilometres (631 mi^{2}). The Kuolajoki originates in the Lake Kuolayarvi in Russia and flows into the river Tenniöjoki in Finland. Its biggest tributary is the Kolsanoya.
