= Iijärvi (Kuusamo) =

Lake in Kuusamo, Finland

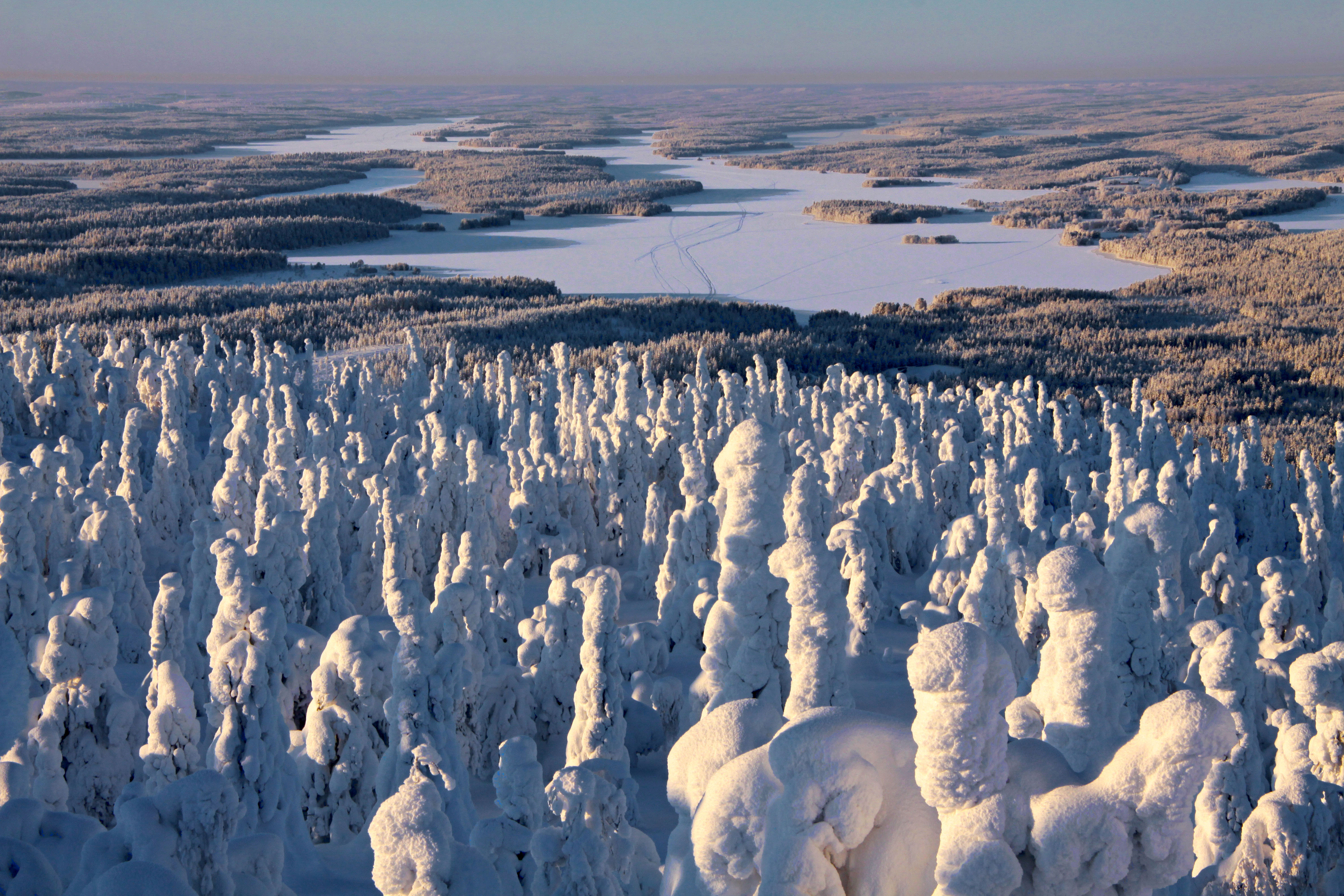

- Location within Finland
- Coordinates: 65.814°N 29.485°E
- Lake type: Natural
- Primary inflows: Perjakkakoski, Rajajoki, Penikkajoki, Tamppikoski
- Catchment area: Iijoki
- Basin countries: Finland
- Surface area: 20.537 km^{2} (7.929 sq mi)
- Average depth: 5.09 m (16.7 ft)
- Max. depth: 20 m (66 ft)
- Water volume: 0.105 km^{3} (0.025 cu mi)
- Shore length^{1}: 110.08 km (68.40 mi)
- Surface elevation: 254.1 m (834 ft)
- Frozen: November-May
- Islands: Kaaperinsaari
- Settlements: Kuusamo
- ^{1} Shore length is not a well-defined measure.

Iijärvi is a medium-sized lake in the Iijoki main catchment area. It is located in the Northern Ostrobothnia region. The lake is formed of many long and narrow bays. One of the bays nearly reach the Finnish National Road 5 and there is a hotel on the strand.

== See also ==
- List of lakes in Finland
