= Lake Leksozero =

Lake in the Republic of Karelia, Russia

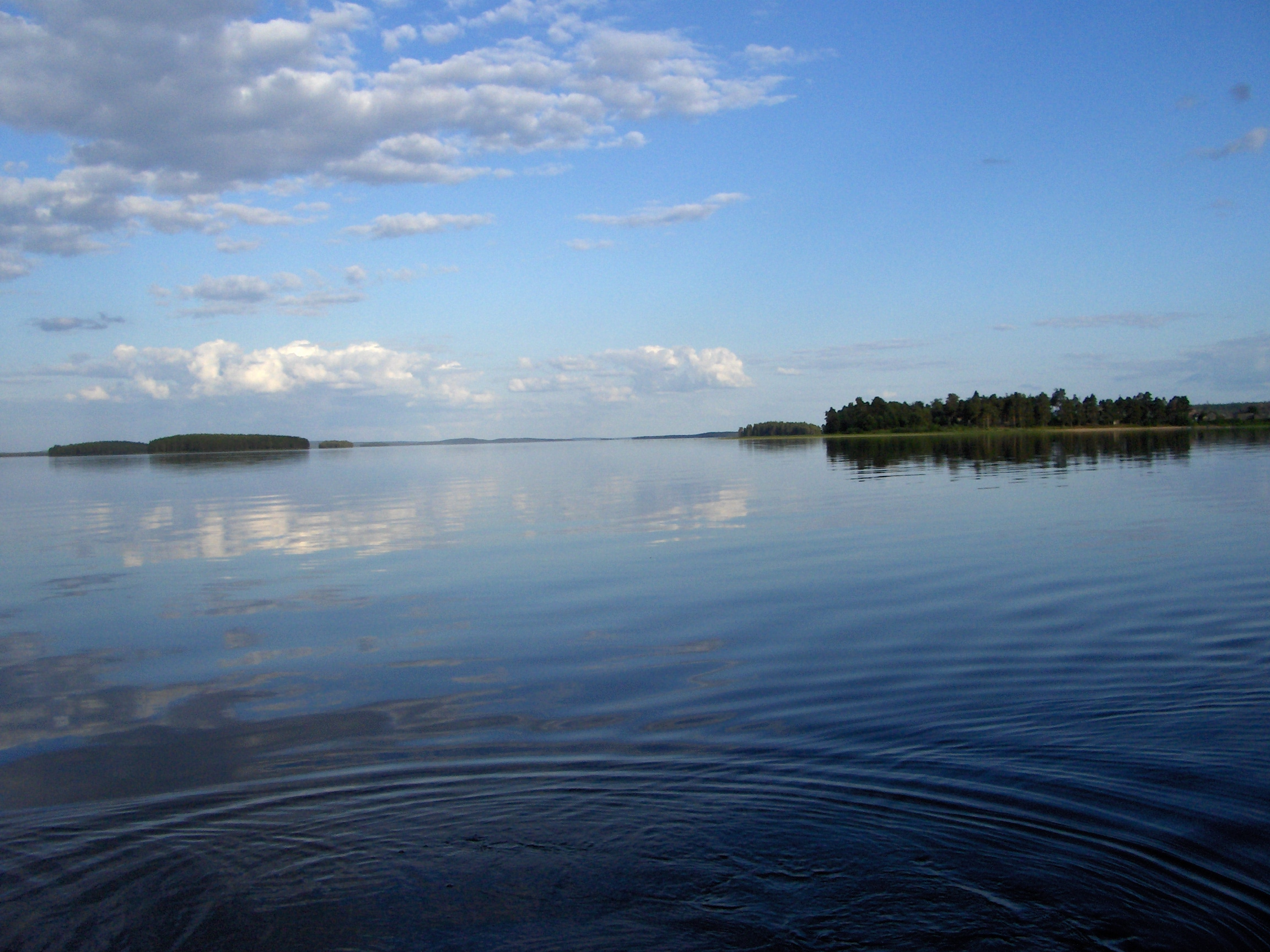
- View from the Repola village

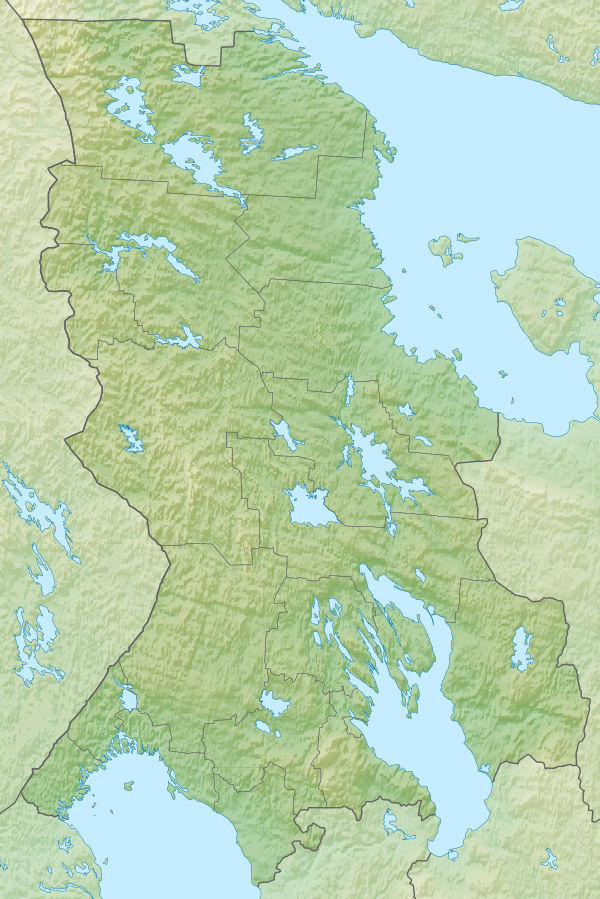
- Location within Russia Location within Karelia
- Location: Republic of Karelia
- Coordinates: 63°46′00″N 30°58′00″E
- Basin countries: Russia
- Surface area: 166 km^{2} (64 sq mi)
- Average depth: 8.5 m (28 ft)
- Max. depth: 34 m (112 ft)
- Water volume: 1.408 km^{3} (1,141,000 acre⋅ft)
- Surface elevation: 174 m (571 ft)
- Frozen: November–May

Lake Leksozero (Russian: Лексозеро, Finnish and Karelian: Lieksajärvi) is a large freshwater lake in the Republic of Karelia, Russia. It has an area of 166 km² and an average depth of 8.6 m. It freezes up in November and stays icebound until May. There are many islands on the lake. Leksozero is used for fishery. The lake drains through the river Lieksanjoki that flows into the lake Pielinen in Northern Karelia, Finland. These lakes are part of the Vuoksi River basin in Finland and Russia, which in turn is part of the Neva River basin in Russia.
