= Lemmenjoki (river) =

Coordinates: 68°43′45″N 026°05′26″E

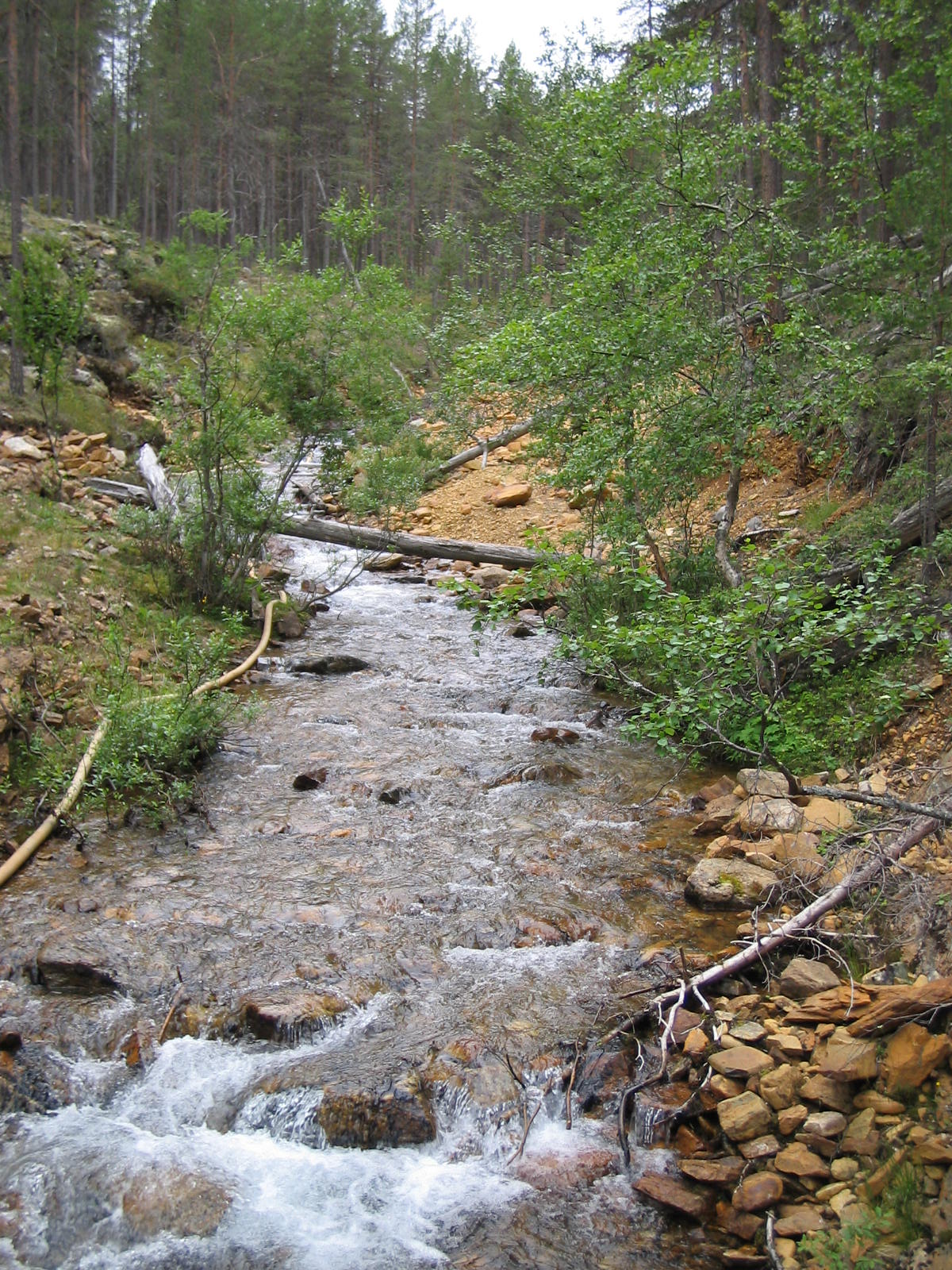

Location
- Country: Finland
- Region: Lapland
- Municipality: Inari

Physical characteristics
- Mouth: Lake Paatari
  - elevation: 144.9 m (475 ft)
- Length: 80 km (50 mi)

The Lemmenjoki (Finnish: Lemmenjoki, Northern Sami: Leammi, Inari Sami: Lemmee) is a river in the northern part of the Finnish province of Lapland. Some 80 kilometres (50 mi) long, it flows from Nautajänkä and terminaties in Lake Paatari.

The name of the river comes from the Sami word "Leammijohka", meaning "warm river" or "the river of love". Due to an erroneous folk etymology, the form Lemmenjoki is often associated with the Finnish word lempi (genitive form lemmen), meaning "love".

The Lemmenjoki National Park derives its name from the river.
