= Porttipahta Reservoir =

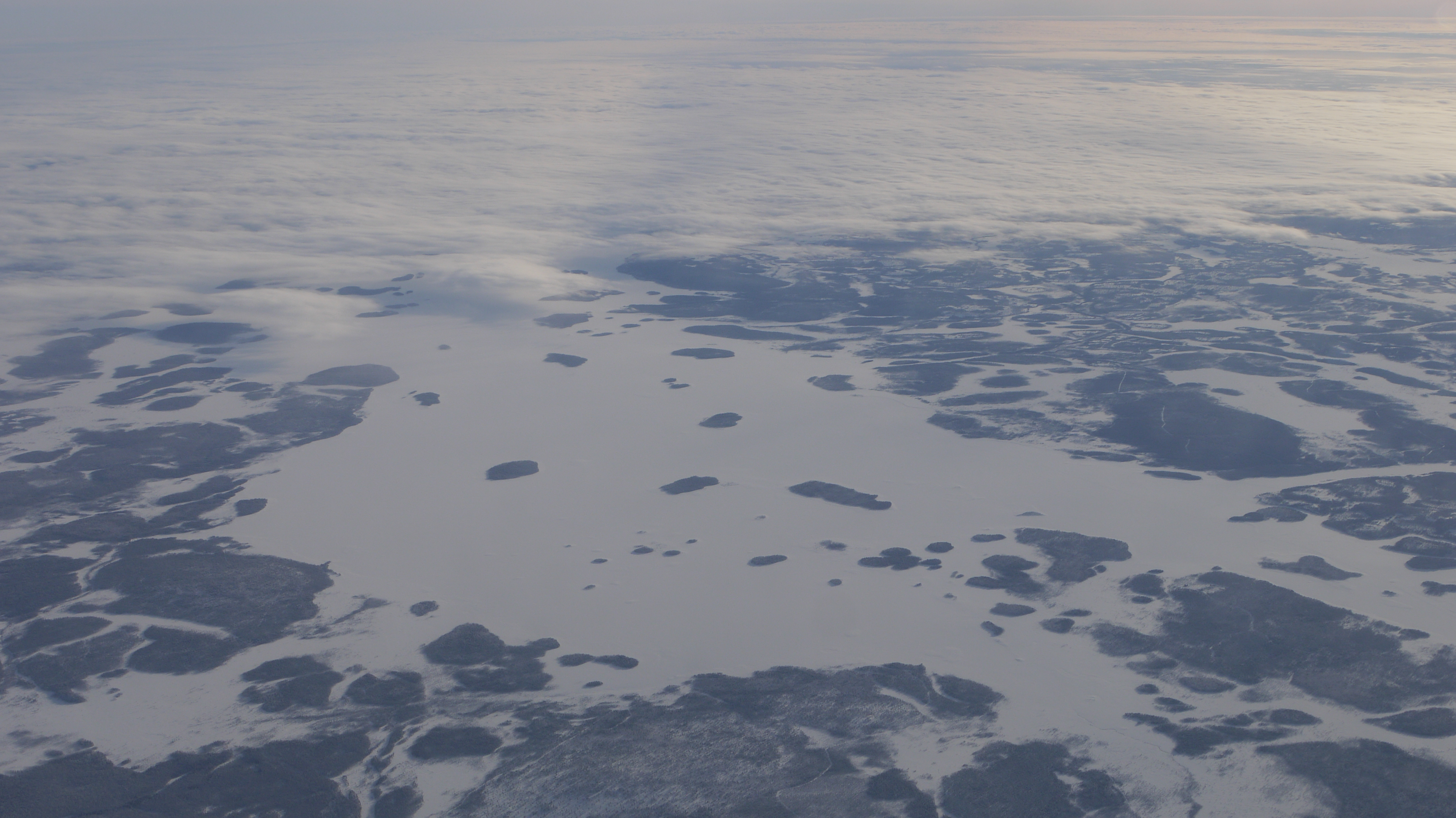
- Western part of the frozen lake in an aerial view

- Location within Finland
- Coordinates: 68°03′N 26°41′E
- Type: Reservoir
- Primary outflows: Kitinen
- Catchment area: Kemijoki
- Basin countries: Finland
- Built: 1970
- Surface area: 148.598 km^{2} (57.374 sq mi)
- Average depth: 4.44 m (14.6 ft)
- Max. depth: 30 m (98 ft)
- Water volume: 0.66 km^{3} (540,000 acre⋅ft)
- Shore length^{1}: 335.59 km (208.53 mi)
- Surface elevation: 242.3 m (795 ft)
- Frozen: November–May
- Settlements: Sodankylä
- ^{1} Shore length is not a well-defined measure.

Porttipahta Reservoir (Finnish: Porttipahdan tekojärvi) is a large lake in the Kemijoki main catchment area. It is located in the region of Lapland in Finland.

== See also ==
- List of lakes in Finland
