= Lake Tulos =

Lake in Karelia, Russia

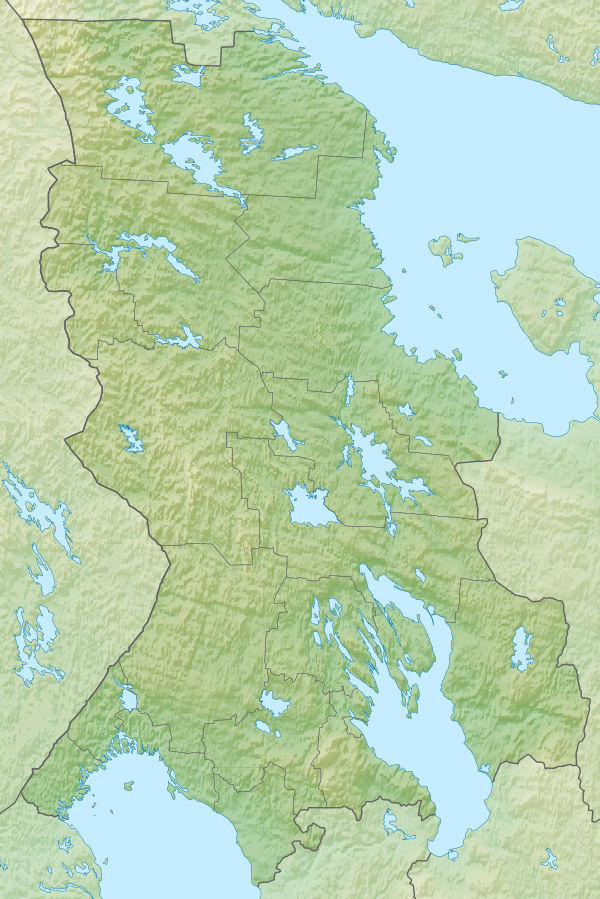
- Location within Russia Location within Karelia
- Location: Republic of Karelia
- Coordinates: 63.5666667°N 30.55°E
- Basin countries: Russia
- Surface area: 95.7 km^{2} (36.9 sq mi)
- Surface elevation: 157 m (515 ft)

Lake Tulos (Russian: Тулос, Finnish: Tuulijärvi) is a large freshwater lake in the Republic of Karelia, Russia, near Finnish border. It has an area of 95.7 km^{2} (36.9 sq mi). It freezes up in November and stays icebound until May. There are many islands on the lake. The waters from the lake flow into the Lieksanjoki river that drains into lake Pielinen, Northern Karelia, Finland.
