= Värriöjoki =

River in the country of Finland

Coordinates: 67°28′N 28°22′E

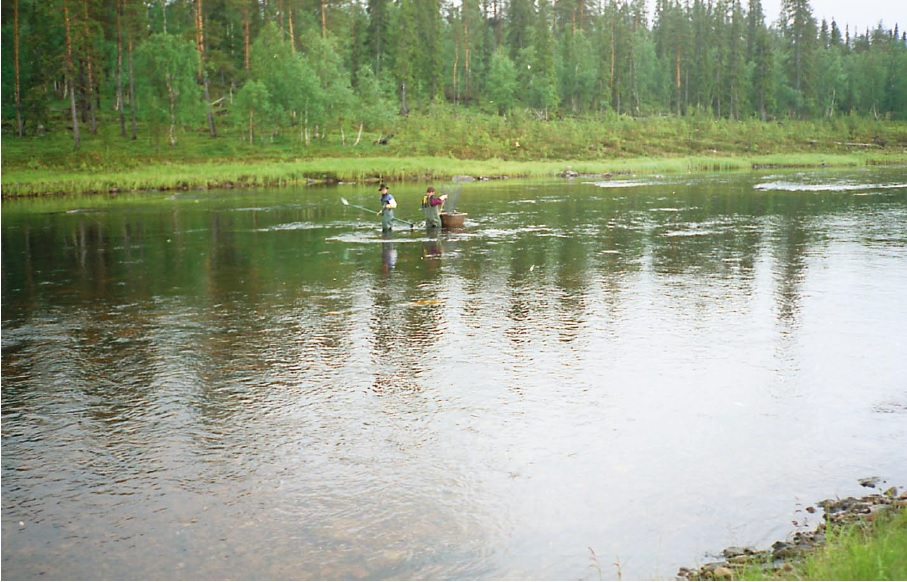
Värriöjoki

Värriöjoki is a tributary river of Kemijoki in Savukoski and Salla in Lapland. The river originates in the Tuntsa Wilderness Area in Salla and joins the River Kemijoki in Martuk Savukoski.
