= Kuohattijärvi =

Lake in Nurmes, Finland

- Location within Finland
- Location: Nurmes
- Coordinates: 63°37′N 29°29′E
- Primary inflows: via Välijoki river from the lake Ylä-Sammaljärvi
- Primary outflows: Miihkelinjoki river and Kuohattijoki river
- Basin countries: Finland
- Surface area: 10.809 km^{2} (4.173 sq mi)
- Average depth: 5.6 m (18 ft)
- Max. depth: 18 m (59 ft)
- Water volume: 0.0606 km^{3} (49,100 acre⋅ft)
- Residence time: 4 years
- Shore length^{1}: 29.22 km (18.16 mi)
- Surface elevation: 161.9 m (531 ft)
- Frozen: December–April
- ^{1} Shore length is not a well-defined measure.

Kuohattijärvi is a medium-sized lake in the Vuoksi main catchment area. It is located in the region of Northern Karelia in Finland.

== See also ==
- List of lakes in Finland
