= Iijoki =

River in Finland

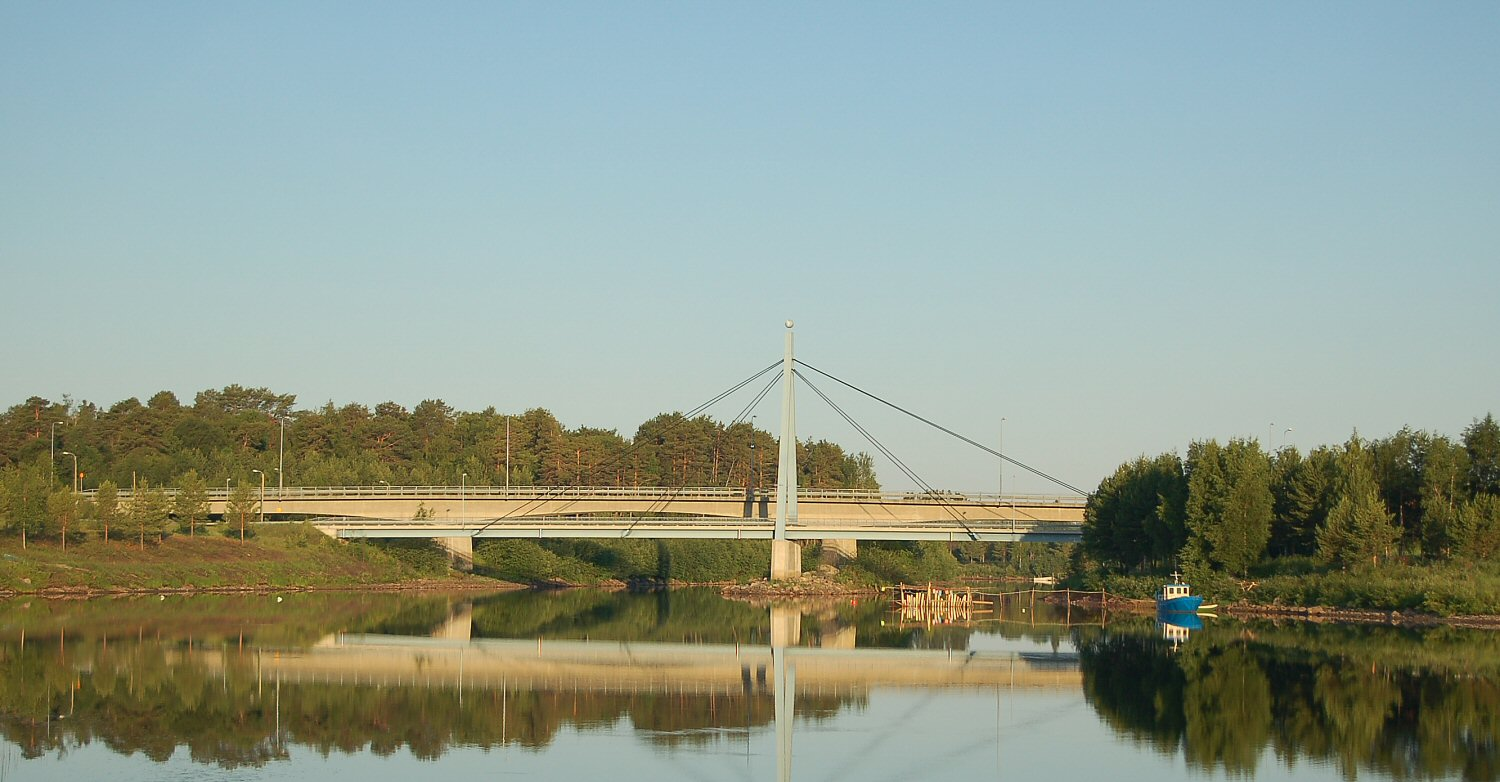
- Bridges of Highway 4 across Iijoki

Location
- Country: Finland

Physical characteristics
- Source
  - location: Iijärvi, Kuusamo
- Mouth
  - location: Gulf of Bothnia, Ii
  - coordinates: 65°19′23″N 25°21′30″E
- Length: 370 km (230 mi)
- Basin size: 14,191 km^{2} (5,479 sq mi)

Iijoki (Swedish: Ijo älv) is a river of Finland in the region of North Ostrobothnia. The river has many tributaries. It flows for 370 kilometres (230 mi) into the Gulf of Bothnia. Some of its main tributaries are Siuruanjoki and Livojoki. It has about 150 rapids.

== See also ==
- List of rivers in Finland
