= Lemmenjoki National Park =

National park in Lapland region, Finland

- IUCN category Ib (wilderness area)
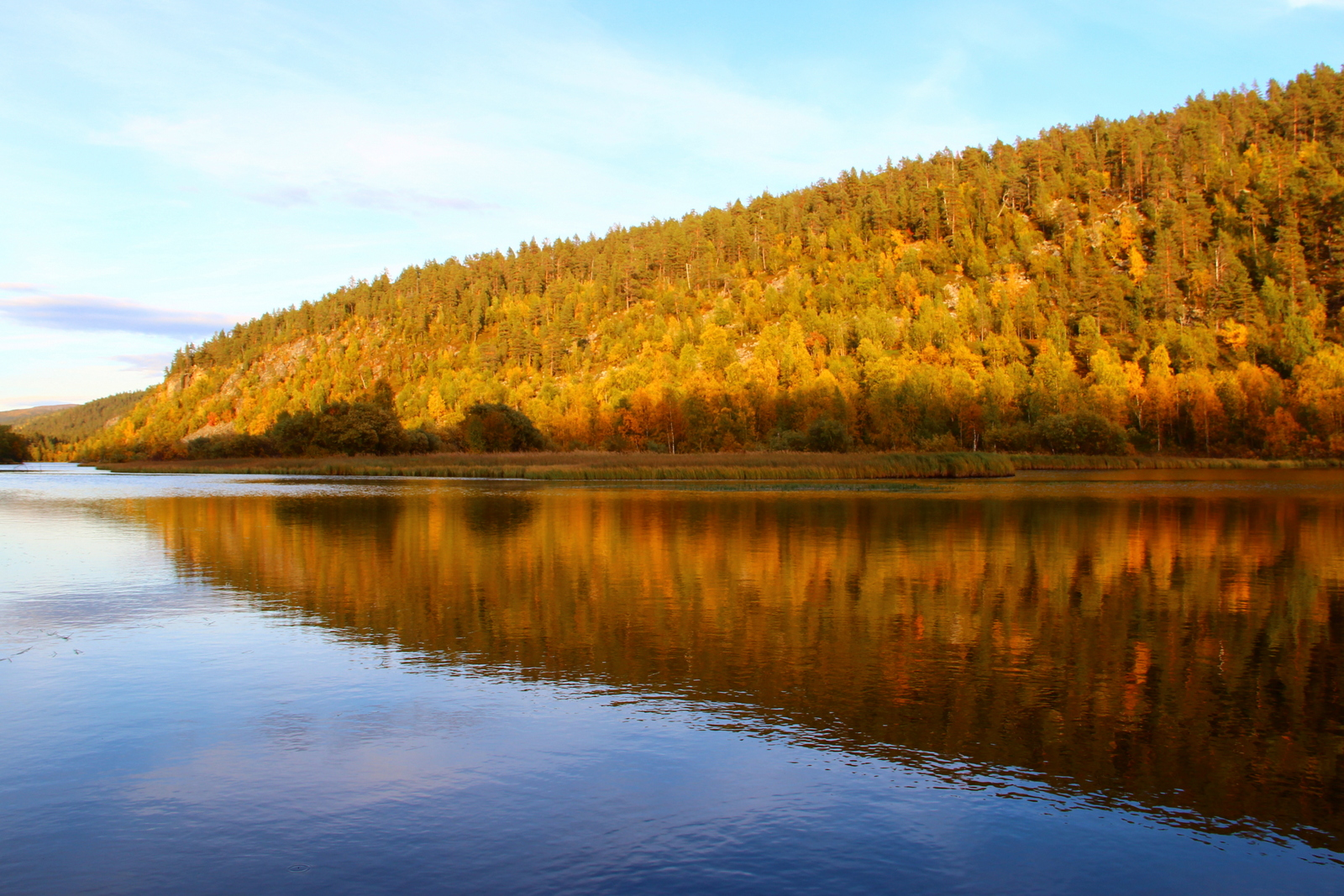
- Autumn colours at River Lemmenjoki at Lemmenjoki National Park in Finland

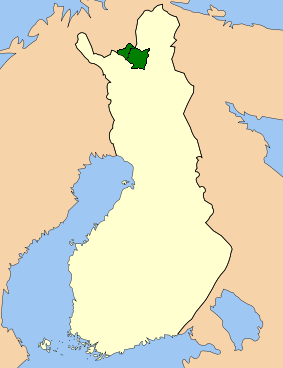
- Lemmenjoki and Anárjohka national parks on map. Lemmenjoki is the larger green area.
- Location: Lapland, Finland
- Coordinates: 68°30′N 025°30′E
- Area: 2,850 km^{2} (1,100 sq mi)
- Established: 1956
- Visitors: 21,100 (in 2024)
- Governing body: Metsähallitus
- Website: www.luontoon.fi/en/destinations/lemmenjoki-national-park

Lemmenjoki National Park (Finnish: Lemmenjoen kansallispuisto, Inari Sami: Lemmee aalmuglâšmecci, Northern Sami: Leammi álbmotmeahcci, Norwegian: Lemmenjoki nasjonalpark) is situated in area of municipalities of Inari and Kittilä, Lapland, in Northern Finland. It was founded in 1956 and has since been expanded twice. Its total area is 2,850 square kilometres (1,100 sq mi), making it the biggest national park of Finland and one of the largest in Europe.

The park is named after the Lemmenjoki River, an 80 kilometres (50 mi) long river running through it.

The park is partly bordered by the Anárjohka National Park in Norway.

Around 100 people can be seen digging gold in the area in the summer on 40 claims. Most of the people in the park – around 21,100 people per year – are backpackers, though. There are about 60 kilometres (40 mi) marked paths in the national park, and even some bridges and boats are put up for travelers. There are more than ten free wilderness huts in the park and three chargeable, bookable ones.

The gold-digging area contains two small airfields, Martiniiskonpalo (467 m or 1,532 ft) and Keurulainen (about 500 m or 1,600 ft). They can be used for landing or taking off with small propeller planes.

== Gold Prospecting ==
In 2020, a significant policy shift took place in Lemmenjoki National Park when mechanized gold mining was banned following the expiration of transitional mining rights under the updated Mining Act. The nine-year transition period, which began after legislative changes in 2011, allowed operators time to continue machine-based gold panning until 30 June 2020, after which no new permits for mechanized prospecting within the park were issued. As a result, gold prospecting in Lemmenjoki National Park is now restricted to traditional manual methods, such as hand panning and shovel work. Additionally, all former operators were mandated to remove machinery and related infrastructure and to restore any disturbed areas within two years, including leveling of mining pits and supporting the regrowth of native vegetation.

The transition was prompted by concern regarding the substantial environmental impacts of mechanized mining. Intensive use of excavators and other machinery had contributed to soil and landscape disturbance, water quality degradation in rivers, and adverse effects on fish stocks and the ecosystem. Additionally it caused disturbances to Sámi traditional livelihoods such as reindeer herding, through habitat fragmentation and increased human presence. These impacts were deemed incompatible with the park’s conservation and sustainability objectives, as well as with the protection of Sámi cultural rights and land use.

A prospecting themed hiking trail, 'Gold Route' (Kultareitti), has been founded in the National Park. The route passes through historically significant gold fields and cabins, and the signage educates visitors on gold prospecting methods, local legends, and the region's geology.

== See also ==
- List of national parks of Finland
- Protected areas of Finland
