= Perhonjoki =

River in Finland

Coordinates: 63°53′N 023°09′E

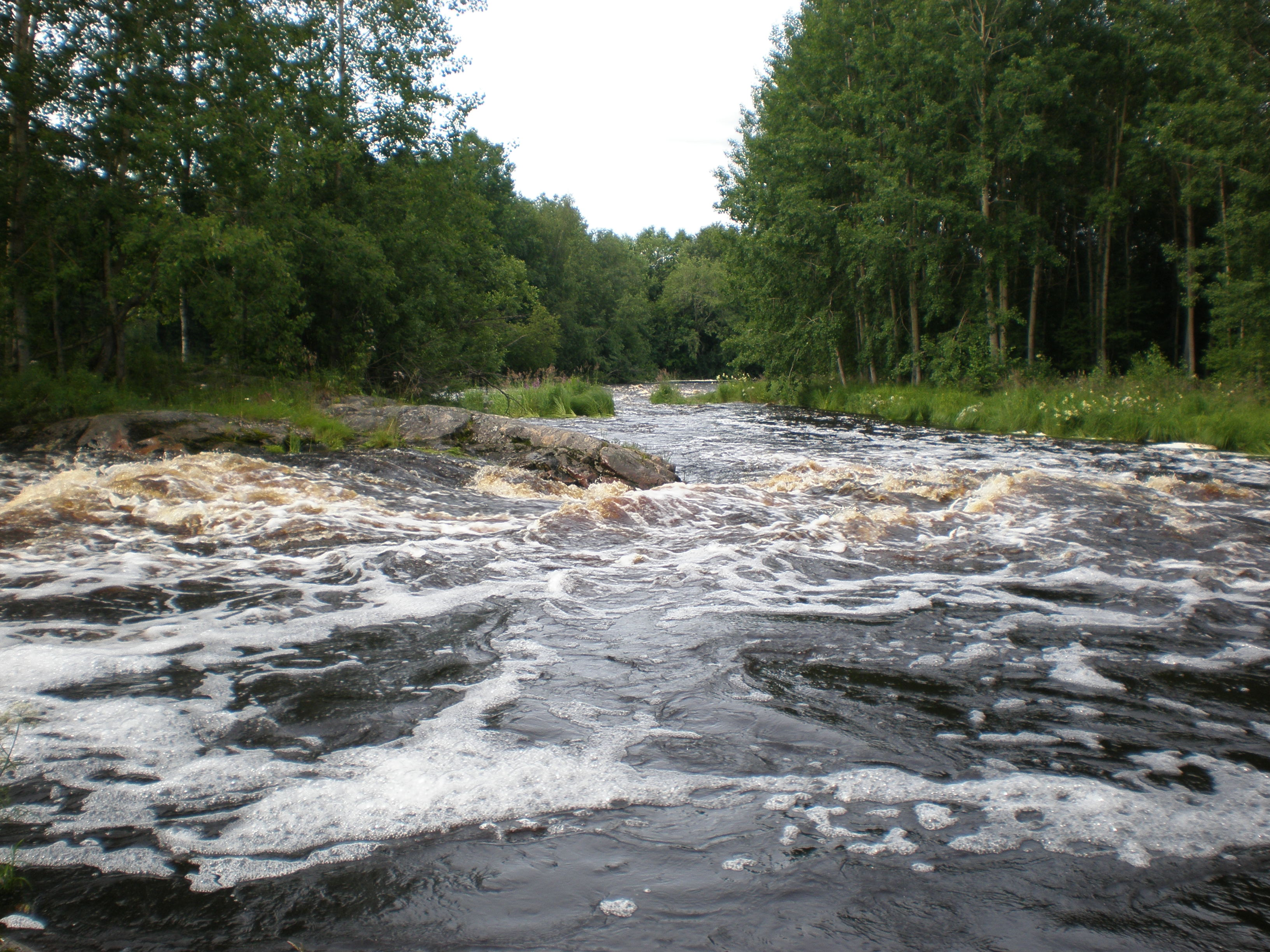

Location
- Country: Finland

Physical characteristics
- Mouth: Gulf of Bothnia
  - location: Kokkola
- Length: 114 km (71 mi)

Perhonjoki is a river of Finland in Central Ostrobothnia region. It originates in Suomenselkä from the small lakes on the border of the municipalities of Perho, Kyyjärvi and Kivijärvi, and it flows for 114 kilometres (71 mi) into the Gulf of Bothnia.

== See also ==
- List of rivers of Finland
