= Juutuanjoki =

River in the country of Finland

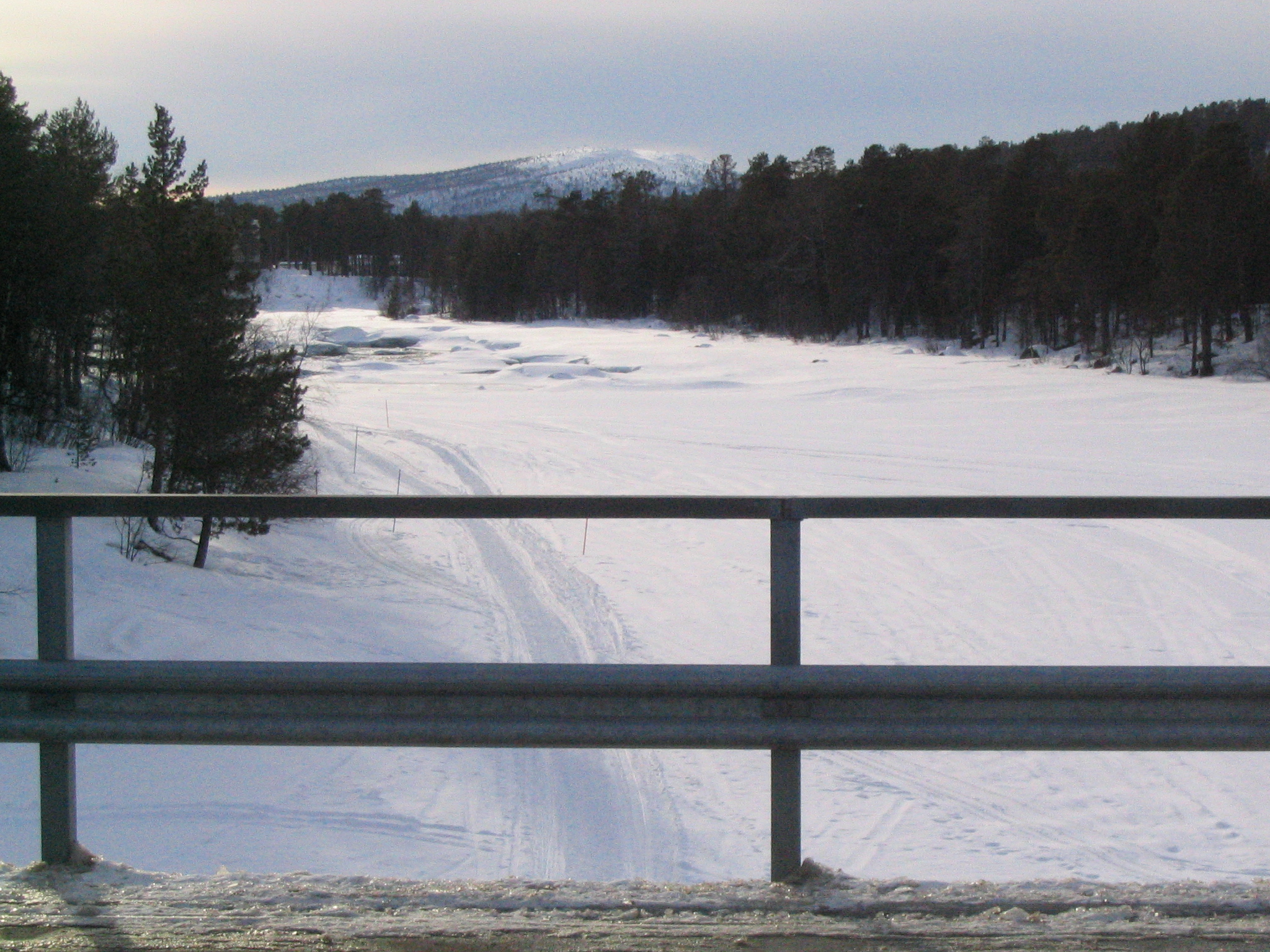

Location
- Country: Finland

Physical characteristics
- Source
  - location: Lake Solojärvi, Inari
- Mouth
  - location: Lake Inari
  - coordinates: 68°54′30″N 27°0′40″E
- Length: 10 km (6.2 mi)

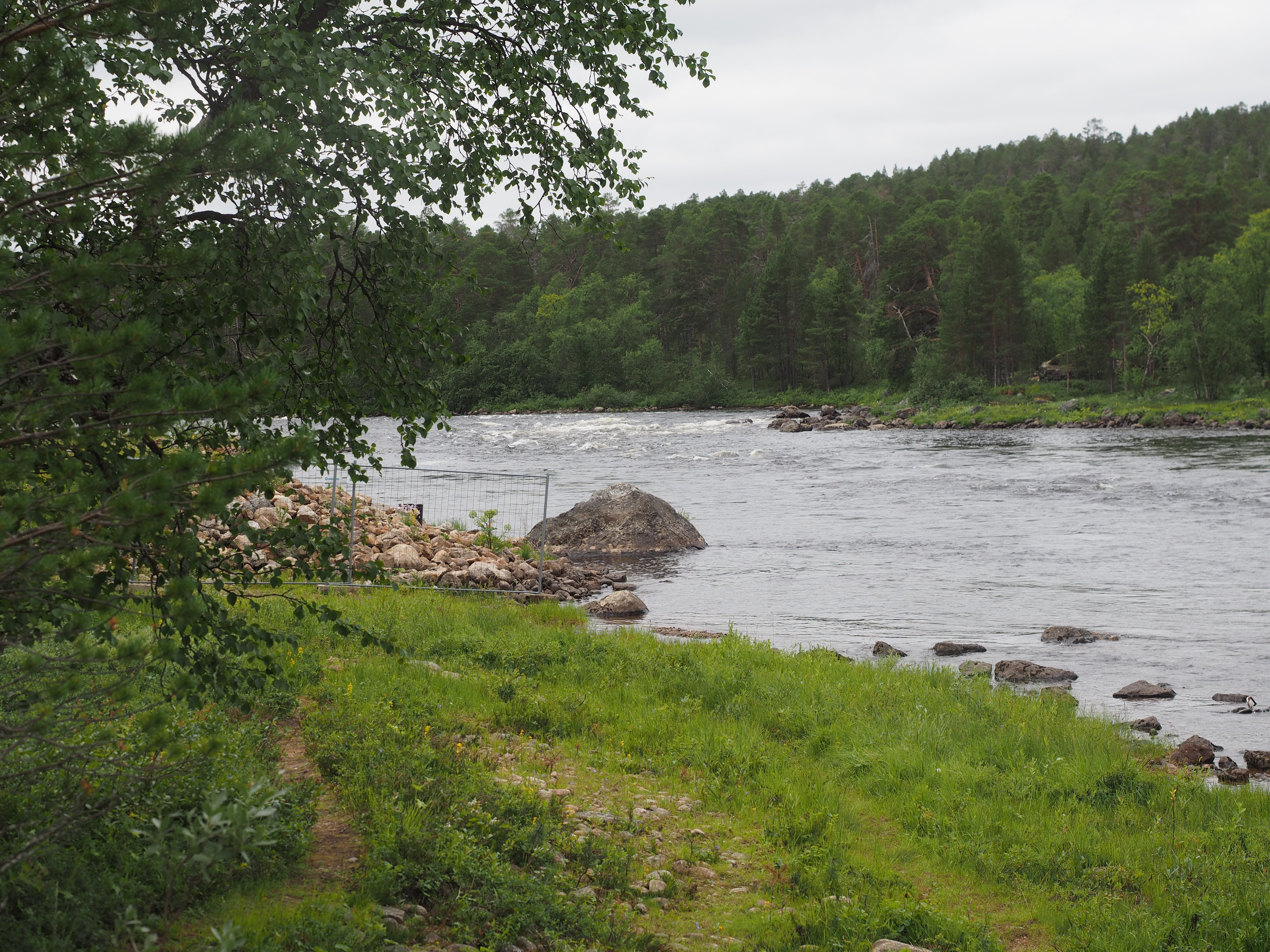
A view of the shore of Juutuanjoki.

Juutuanjoki is a river of Finland that flows from Lake Solojärvi in the municipality of Inari in Finnish Lapland into Lake Inari, which in turn flows into the Paatsjoki River towards Russia and into the Barents Sea.

== See also ==
- List of rivers of Finland
