= Höytiäinen =

Lake in North Karelia, Finland

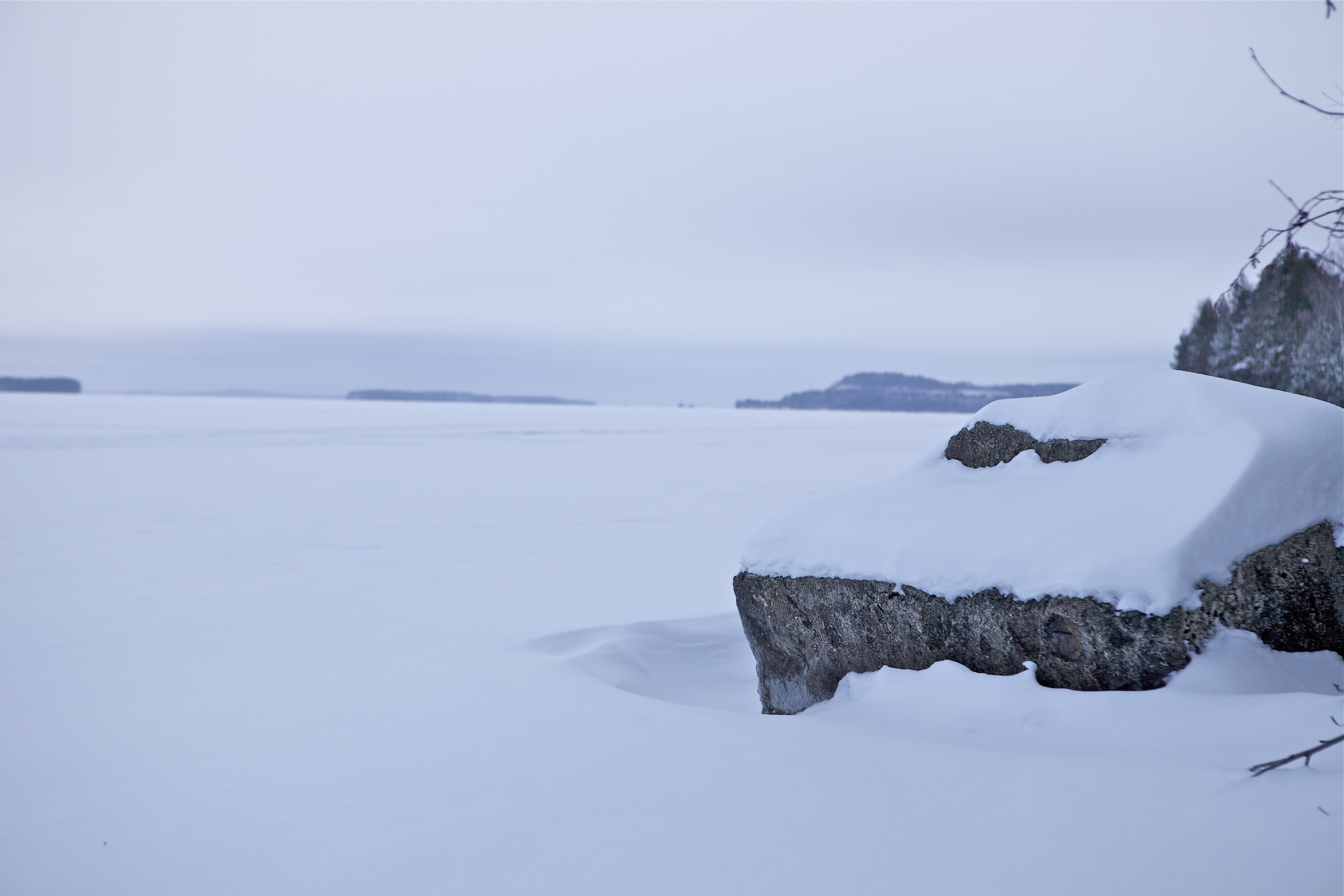
- Frozen lake Höytiäinen

- Location within Finland
- Location: North Karelia
- Coordinates: 62°48′N 029°39′E
- Primary outflows: Puntarikoski
- Basin countries: Finland
- Surface area: 282.64 km^{2} (109.13 sq mi)
- Max. depth: 62 m (203 ft)
- Surface elevation: 87.3 metres (286 ft)
- Settlements: Kontiolahti

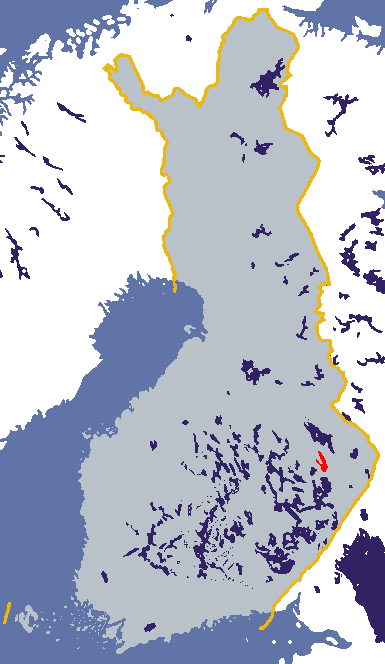
Location of the lake

Höytiäinen is a lake in Finland. Due to a mismanaged drainage attempt during 1859, the lake was reduced by around one third of its size. It flows through a channel formed in the drainage attempt, called Höytiäisenkanava, into Lake Pyhäselkä in the province of Northern Karelia. This flows into the Vuoksi River, then into the Neva River delta and via Russia to the Gulf of Finland.
