= Iijärvi (Suomussalmi) =

Small lake of northern Finland

Lake Iijärvi
- Location within Finland
- Coordinates: 65.510°N 29.545°E
- Lake type: Natural
- Primary inflows: Sakkojoki
- Primary outflows: Joutenvirta
- Catchment area: Oulujoki
- Basin countries: Finland
- Surface area: 7.792 km^{2} (3.009 sq mi)
- Average depth: 7.82 m (25.7 ft)
- Water volume: 0.0615 km^{3} (0.0148 cu mi)
- Shore length^{1}: 34.09 km (21.18 mi)
- Surface elevation: 218.1 m (716 ft)
- Frozen: November-May
- ^{1} Shore length is not a well-defined measure.

Iijärvi is a rather small lake in Suomussalmi, Finland. It belongs to the Oulujoki main catchment area. It is situated partly in Kainuu region and partly in Northern Ostrobothnia region. The lake is situated in the border of Hossa Nature Protection Area.

== See also ==
- List of lakes in Finland
