= Kuusamojärvi =

Lake in Kuusamo, Finland

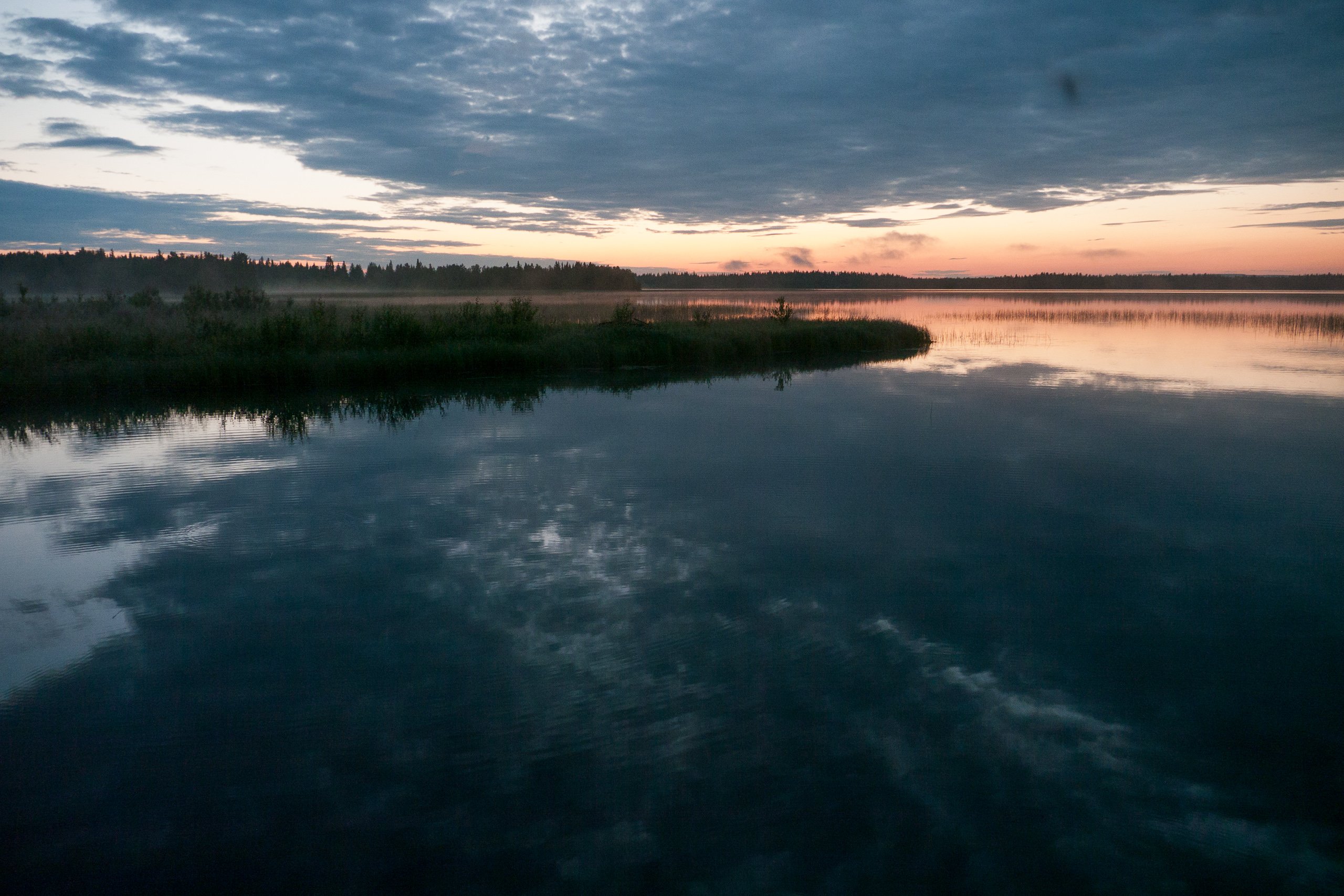

- Location within Finland
- Location: Kuusamo, Finland
- Coordinates: 65°54′N 029°22′E
- Basin countries: Finland
- Surface elevation: 253.0 m (830.1 ft)
- Settlements: Kuusamo

Kuusamojärvi is a lake in Finland. It is situated in the town of Kuusamo in the Northern Ostrobothnia region in northern Finland.

The lake is a part of the Kem River basin that drains into the White Sea in the Republic of Karelia, Russia.

== See also ==
- List of lakes in Finland
