= Lake Pyhäselkä =

Lake in Finland

Pyhäselkä
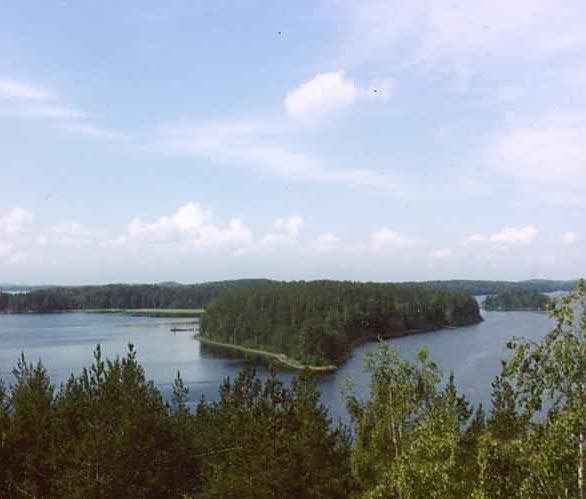

- Location within Finland
- Location: North Karelia
- Coordinates: 62°28′N 029°46′E
- Primary inflows: Höytiäinen, Pielisjoki
- Basin countries: Finland
- Surface area: 361.10 km^{2} (139.42 sq mi)
- Surface elevation: 75.9 m (249 ft)
- Islands: Tikansaari
- Settlements: Joensuu, Pyhäselkä, Rääkkylä

Pyhäselkä is a lake in Finland. It forms the northernmost part of the Saimaa lake system.

== Geography ==
- Pieni Laitasaari, island
