= Iijärvi (Ristijärvi) =

Lake in Paltamo and Ristijärvi, Finland

Lake Iijärvi
- Location within Finland
- Coordinates: 64°29′36″N 29°06′49″E
- Catchment area: Oulujoki
- Basin countries: Finland
- Surface area: 21.969 km^{2} (8.482 sq mi)
- Average depth: 5.43 m (17.8 ft)
- Max. depth: 31 m (102 ft)
- Water volume: 0.119 km^{3} (0.029 cu mi)
- Shore length^{1}: 101.9 km (63.3 mi)
- Surface elevation: 134.3 m (441 ft)
- Frozen: November-May
- Islands: Heikkisensaari, Putkonsaari
- Settlements: Ristijärvi
- ^{1} Shore length is not a well-defined measure.

Iijärvi is a medium-sized lake in the Oulujoki main catchment area. It is located in the Kainuu region, northern Finland.

== See also ==
- List of lakes in Finland
