= Ethnic groups in Finland =

A variety of ethnic groups have long existed in Finland. Prominent examples include the Swedish speaking minority within the country and the Sámi peoples in the north. With modern international migration to Finland, different ethnolinguistics groups populate the country, most prominently in Helsinki.

Finland officially records one language as a first language for permanent residents. Thus Finland does not count ethnicity but constructs a total based on the idea of numbers of first language speakers. Thus Swedish speakers from Sweden are counted in with Swedish-speaking Finns even though they are 2 different ethnic groups. Similarly there are many Sámi people who on ethnic grounds are not counted in the figures below as Sámi, but as Finns as this is their registered first language.

== Finland-Swedes ==
The largest minority group in Finland is the Swedish-speaking Finns, who in 2024 numbered with all Swedish speakers in the country (which includes 7 860 Swedish citizens) a total of 285,360 which is 5% of the total population. Municipalities are classified as either monolingual or bilingual with a majority language. Most Swedish-speakers live in unilingual Swedish-speaking municipalities. These municipalities are found in coastal areas, from Ostrobothnia to the southern coast, and in the archipelago of Åland.

== Estonians ==
Estonians are the largest foreign group by nationality. In 2024 there were 50,444 Estonian citizens in Finland.

The number of Estonians grew rapidly after the collapse of the Soviet Union and Estonian's EU membership. The main reasons were higher salaries and better job opportunities in Finland. More recently, with Estonia's fast development the trend to move to Finland has been losing its popularity.

== Iraqis ==
As of 2024 there were 23,120 Iraqis in Finland.

== Russians ==
Russians in Finland come from two major waves. About 5,000 originate from a population that immigrated in the 19th and early 20th centuries, when Finland was a Grand Duchy under the rule of Imperial Russia. Another consisted of those who immigrated after the dissolution of the Soviet Union. A significant catalyst was the right of return, based on President Koivisto's initiative that people of Ingrian ancestry would be allowed to immigrate to Finland.

About 35,172 people have citizenship of the Russian Federation (2024). Russian is the mother language of about 102,487 people in Finland.

== Karelians ==
In 2011 there were about 30,000 people who identified as Karelian in Finland. About 5,000 of them are fluent or native in the Karelian language but about 25,000 of them can speak Karelian. The Karelians are a closely related ethnic group to Finns. Karelians in Finland mostly live in a diaspora around the country and in North Karelia. All dialects of Karelian are spoken in Finland. Before 2009 Karelian was taught as a dialect of Finnish, but in 2009 it was given official status as a language in Finland.

== Sámi ==
The Sámi are related to the Finns, and each people speaks a non-Indo-European language belonging to the Uralic family of languages. Once present throughout the country, the Sámi gradually moved northward under the pressure of the advancing Finns. As they were a nomadic people in a sparsely settled land, the Sámi were always able to find new and open territory in which to follow their traditional activities of hunting, fishing, and slash-and-burn agriculture. By the 16th century, most Sámi lived in the northern half of the country, and it was during this period that they converted to Christianity. By the 19th century, most of them lived in the parts of Lapland that were still their home in the 1980s. The last major shift in Sámi settlement was the migration westward of 600 Skolt Sámi from the Petsamo region after it was ceded to the Soviet Union in 1944. A reminder of their eastern origin was their Orthodox faith; the remaining 85 percent of Finland's Sámi were Lutheran.

In 1988, about 90 percent of Finland's 4,400 Sámi-speaking citizens lived in the municipalities of Enontekiö, Inari, and Utsjoki, and in the reindeer-herding area of Sodankylä. According to Finnish regulations, anyone who spoke one of the Sámi languages, or who had a relative who was a Sámi, was registered as a Sámi in census records. Finnish Sámi spoke three distinct Sámi languages, but by the late 1980s perhaps only a minority actually had Sámi as their first language. Sámi children had the right to instruction in Sámi, but there were few qualified instructors or textbooks available. One reason for the scarcity of written material in Sámi is that the three Sámi languages spoken in Finland made agreement on a common orthography difficult. Perhaps these shortcomings explained why a 1979 study found the educational level of Sámi to be considerably lower than that of other Finns.

Few Finnish Sámi actually led the traditional nomadic life pictured in school geography texts and in travel brochures. Although many Sámi living in rural regions of Lapland earned some of their livelihood from reindeer herding, it was estimated that Sámi owned no more than one-third of Finland's 200,000 reindeer. Only 5 percent of Finnish Sámi had the herds of 250 to 300 reindeer needed to live entirely from this kind of work. Most Sámi worked at more routine activities, including farming, construction, and service industries such as tourism. Often a variety of jobs and sources of income supported Sámi families, which were, on the average, twice the size of a typical Finnish family. Sámi also were aided by old-age pensions and by government welfare, which provided a greater share of their income than it did for Finns as a whole.

There have been many efforts over the years by Finnish authorities to safeguard the Sámi' culture and way of life and to ease their entry into modern society. Officials created bodies that dealt with the Sámi minority, or formed committees that studied their situation. An early body was the Society for the Promotion of Lapp Culture, formed in 1932. In 1960 the government created the Advisory Commission on Lapp Affairs. The Sámi themselves formed the Saami-liitto in 1945 and the Johti Sabmelazzat, a more aggressive organization, in 1968. In 1973 the government arranged for elections every four years to a twenty-member Sami Parliaments that was to advise authorities. On the international level, there was the Nordic Sami Council of 1956, and there has been a regularly occurring regional conference since then that represented—in addition to Finland's Sámi—Norway's 20,000 Sámi, Sweden's 10,000 Sámi, and the 1,000 to 2,000 Sámi who remained in the Kola Peninsula in Russia.

Sámi languages have an official status in the municipalities of Enontekiö, Inari, and Utsjoki, and in the northern part of Sodankylä since 1992. In 2023, over 60% of the 10,000 Sámi in Finland lived outside of this area.

== Romani ==
Romani people, also called Kale and Roma, have been present in Finland since the second half of the 16th century. With their unusual dress, unique customs, and specialized trades for earning their livelihood, Roma have stood out, and their stay in the country has not been an easy one. They have suffered periodic harassment from the hands of both private citizens and public officials, and the last of the special laws directed against them was repealed only in 1883. Even in the second half of the 1980s, Finland's 5,000 to 6,000 Romani remained a distinct group, separated from the general population both by their own choice and by the fears and the prejudices many Finns felt toward them. There are 13,000-14,000 Romani people in Finland.

Finnish Roma, like Roma elsewhere, chose to live apart from the dominant societal groups. A Roma's loyalty was to his or her family and to their people in general. Marriages with non-Roma were uncommon, and the Roma's own language, spoken as a first language only by a few in the 1980s, was used to keep outsiders away. An individual's place within Roma society was largely determined by age and by sex, old males having authority. A highly developed system of values and a code of conduct governed a Roma's behavior, and when Roma sanctions, violent or not, were imposed, for example via "blood feuds," they had far more meaning than any legal or social sanctions of Finnish society.

Unlike the Sámi, who lived concentrated in a single region, the Romani lived throughout Finland. While most Sámi wore ordinary clothing in their everyday life, Romani could be identified by their dress; the men generally wore high boots and the women almost always dressed in very full, long velvet skirts. Like most Sámi, however, Roma also had largely abandoned a nomadic way of life and had permanent residences. Romani men had for centuries worked as horse traders, but they had adapted themselves to postwar Finland by being active as horse breeders and as dealers in cars and scrap metal. Women continued their traditional trades of fortune telling and handicrafts.

Since the 1960s, Finnish authorities have undertaken measures to improve the Romani's standard of life. Generous state financial arrangements have improved their housing. Their low educational level (an estimated 20 percent of adult Romani could not read) was raised, in part, through more vocational training. A permanent Advisory Commission on Gypsy Affairs was set up in 1968, and in 1970 racial discrimination was outlawed through an addition to the penal code. The law punished blatant acts such as barring Romani from restaurants or shops or subjecting them to unusual surveillance by shopkeepers or the police.

== Jews ==
There are about 1,300 Jews in Finland, of whom 800 live in Helsinki and most of the remainder in Turku. During the period of Swedish rule, Jews had been forbidden to live in Finland. Once the country became part of the Russian Empire, however, Jewish veterans of the Tsarist army had the right to settle anywhere they wished within the empire. Although constrained by law to follow certain occupations, mainly those connected with the sale of clothes, the Jewish community in Finland was able to prosper, and by 1890 it numbered around 1,000. Finnish independence brought complete civil rights, and during the interwar period there were some 2,000 Jews in Finland, most of them living in urban areas in the south. During the Continuation War when Finland allied with Nazi Germany, Finnish authorities refused to implement anti-Jewish laws or hand over Jews of Finnish citizenship despite German demands, and the country's Jewish community survived the war virtually intact. However, eight Austrian Jews were extradited to Germany and seven of them were murdered; following controversy, later in the war non-Finnish Jews were transported to neutral Sweden. By the 1980s, assimilation and emigration had significantly reduced the size of the community, and it was only with some difficulty that it maintained synagogues, schools, libraries, and other pertinent institutions.

== Tatars ==
The community of Finnish Tatars numbers only about 800. The Tatars first came to Finland from the Russian Volga region near Nizni Novgorod's Tatar villages in the mid-19th century; a Tatar presence has continued in Finland in the century and a half since, with Tatars chiefly active in commerce. The Tatars in Finland have significantly integrated into the Finnish society but continue to maintain their different religion, mother tongue, and ethnic culture.

== Chinese ==
As of 2024, there were 17,992 people born in China living in Finland.
