= 1473 Ounas =

Main-belt asteroid

Discovery
- Discovered by: Y. Väisälä
- Discovery site: Turku Obs.
- Discovery date: 22 October 1938

Designations
- Named after: Ounasjoki River (in Finland)
- Alternative designations: 1938 UT · 1950 NZ; 1950 PB_{1}
- Minor planet category: main-belt · (middle)

Orbital characteristics
- Epoch 16 February 2017 (JD 2457800.5)
- Uncertainty parameter 0
- Observation arc: 77.90 yr (28,452 days)
- Aphelion: 3.1862 AU
- Perihelion: 1.9623 AU
- Semi-major axis: 2.5743 AU
- Eccentricity: 0.2377
- Orbital period (sidereal): 4.13 yr (1,509 days)
- Mean anomaly: 19.843°
- Mean motion: 0° 14^{m} 18.96^{s} / day
- Inclination: 13.651°
- Longitude of ascending node: 216.52°
- Argument of perihelion: 129.42°

Physical characteristics
- Dimensions: 17.62 km (derived); 18.164±0.109; 20.032 km (dated)
- Synodic rotation period: 16 h (dated); 139.1±0.1 h 139.1±0.5 h
- Geometric albedo: 0.0841 (dated); 0.110±0.018; 0.1189 (derived)
- Spectral type: S
- Absolute magnitude (H): 11.67±0.32 · 11.7 · 11.8

1473 Ounas, provisional designation 1938 UT, is a stony asteroid, suspected tumbler and a slow rotator from the middle region of the asteroid belt, approximately 18 kilometers in diameter. It was discovered on 22 October 1938, by Finnish astronomer Yrjö Väisälä at Turku Observatory in Southwest Finland. The asteroid was named after the Finnish Ounas river.

== Classification and orbit ==
Ounas is a S-type asteroid that orbits the Sun in the central main-belt at a distance of 2.0–3.2 AU once every 4 years and 2 months (1,509 days). Its orbit has an eccentricity of 0.24 and an inclination of 14° with respect to the ecliptic. As no precoveries were taken, and no previous identifications were made, the body's observation arc begins with its official discovery observation at Turku in 1938.

== Physical characteristics ==
In October 2012/13, a rotational lightcurve of Ounas was obtained from photometric observations by astronomers René Roy, Vladimir Benishek, Andrea Ferrero, Daniel Klinglesmith, Frederick Pilcher, Raoul Behrend and Petr Pravec. It gave a well-defined rotation period of 139.1 hours with a brightness variation of 0.6 magnitude (U=3/3). Ounas is a suspected "tumbler", which have a non-principal axis rotation (NPAR).

According to the survey carried out by NASA's Wide-field Infrared Survey Explorer with its subsequent NEOWISE mission, the asteroid measures 18.16 kilometers in diameter and its surface has an albedo of 0.11. The Collaborative Asteroid Lightcurve Link derives an albedo of 0.1189 and a diameter of 17.62 kilometers with an absolute magnitude of 11.7.

== Naming ==
This minor planet was named after the Ounas river, one of the principal rivers in Finland. The official naming citation was published by the Minor Planet Center on 20 February 1976 (M.P.C. 3928).
