= Käkkälöjoki =

River in Enontekiö, Finland

Coordinates: 68°22′N 23°56′E

Käkkälöjoki is a river in Finland. It rises near the Norwegian border and flows first southeast, then south and southwest/west until it enters the Ounasjoki River. The confluence is about 15 kilometres (9 mi) from the village Hetta.
