= Iffley Road =

Major arterial road in Oxford, England

Coordinates: 51.747°N 1.242°W

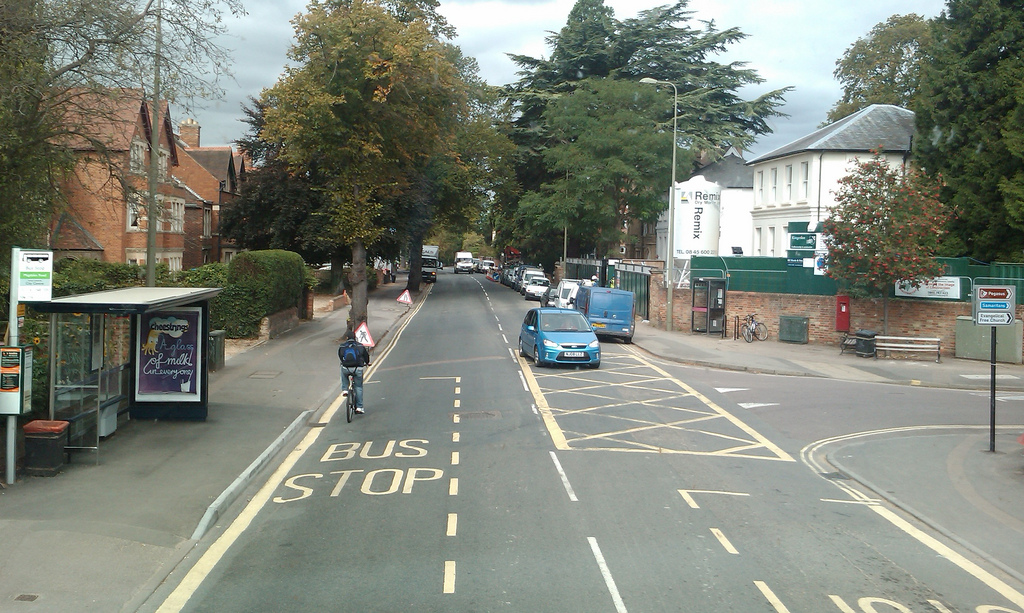
View along Iffley Road.

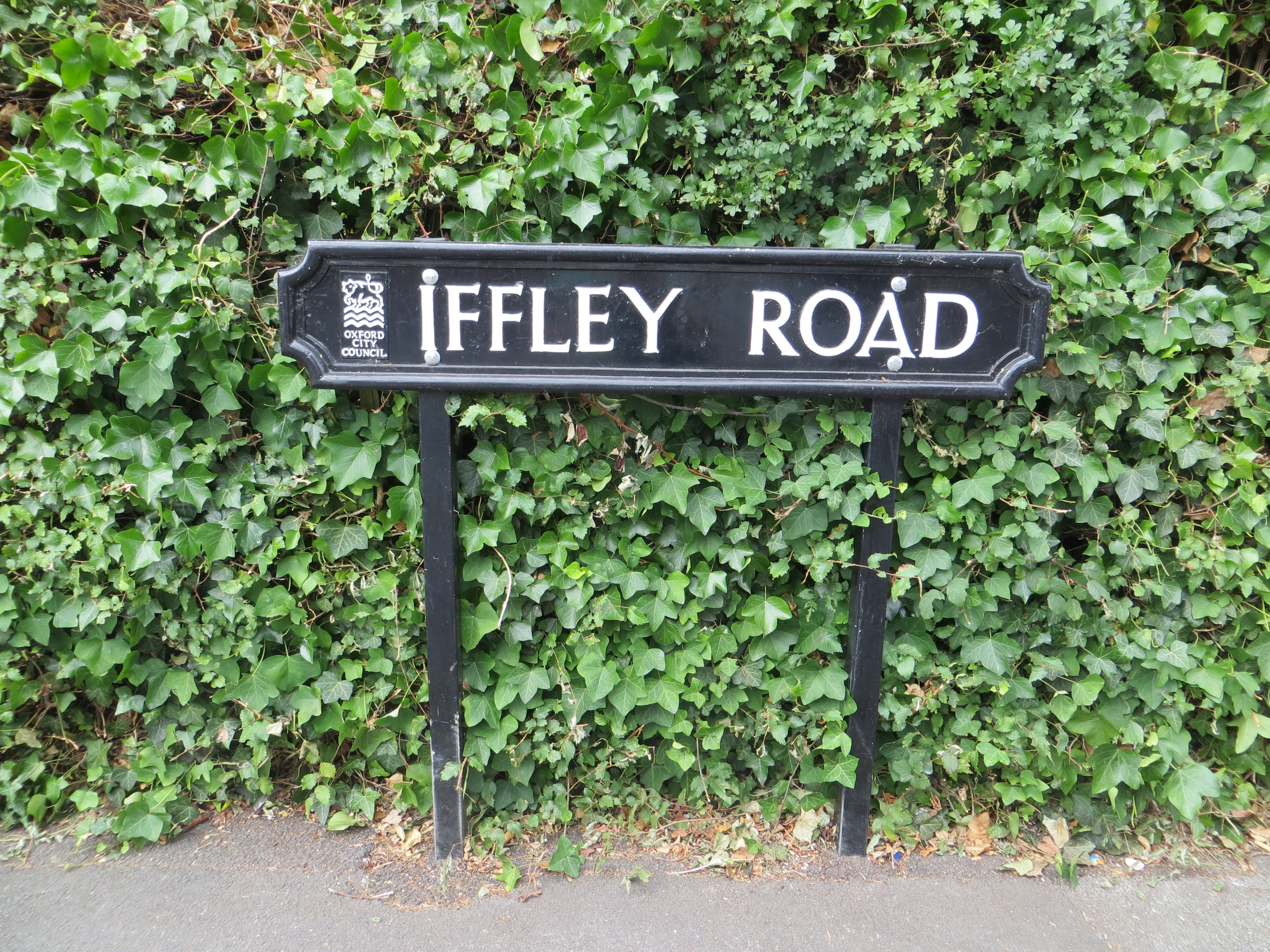
Iffley Road street sign.

Iffley Road is a major arterial road in Oxford, England. It leads from the Plain, near Magdalen Bridge, southeast towards the village of Iffley. While it becomes Henley Avenue at Iffley Turn, and then Rose Hill, the whole stretch from the ring road to the Plain is referred to by some as Iffley Road. Formerly named as Henley Road in the 19th century, as it leads towards Henley-on-Thames, this entire route is designated the A4158.

The road is the location for the Oxford University athletics venue, the Iffley Road Track, where Roger Bannister was the first person to run a mile in under four minutes, on 6 May 1954. The feat is commemorated by blue plaque on Iffley Road. The track is next door to Iffley Road rugby ground, home of Oxford University Rugby Football Club. Also in Iffley Road is Greyfriars, a Capucin priory that was formerly a permanent private hall of the University of Oxford. The Oxford Centre for Animal Ethics is based at 91 Iffley Road, and the headquarters of Transun are to be found at the start of the road.

There are a number of public houses including the Cape of Good Hope at the Plain and 1 Iffley Road, the Cricketers' Arms, now a cocktail bar renamed The Mad Hatter in 2013, and the Fir Tree Tavern.

== References in popular culture ==
Iffley Road is referenced in Emerald Fennel's 2023 film Saltburn, of which the first act is set in Oxford at a fictional college of the University of Oxford. The two main protagonists, Oliver Quick and Felix Catton, first meet as Felix's bicycle is immobilised with a punctured tyre. Oliver offers his own bicycle to Felix so he may proceed to his tutorial class on Iffley Road. This encounter is the genesis of their friendship.

== Gallery ==
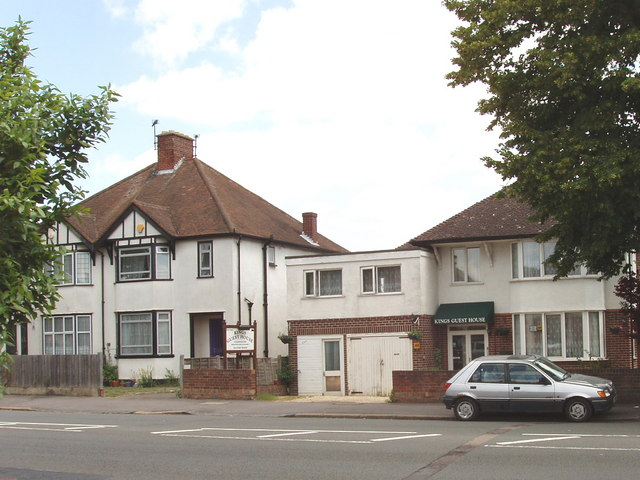
Semi-detached houses on Iffley Road.

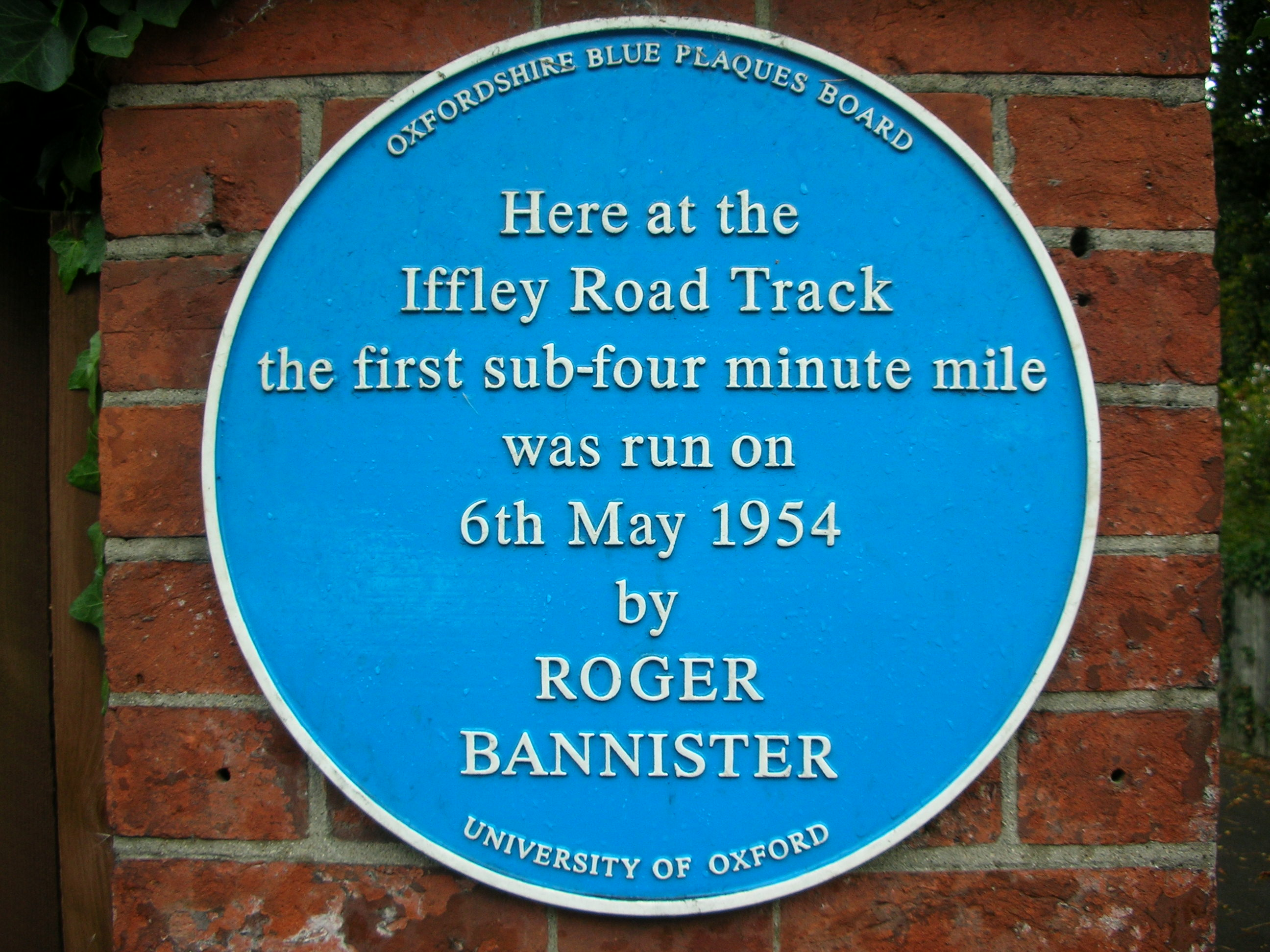
Blue plaque recording the first ever sub-four-minute mile on Iffley Road.

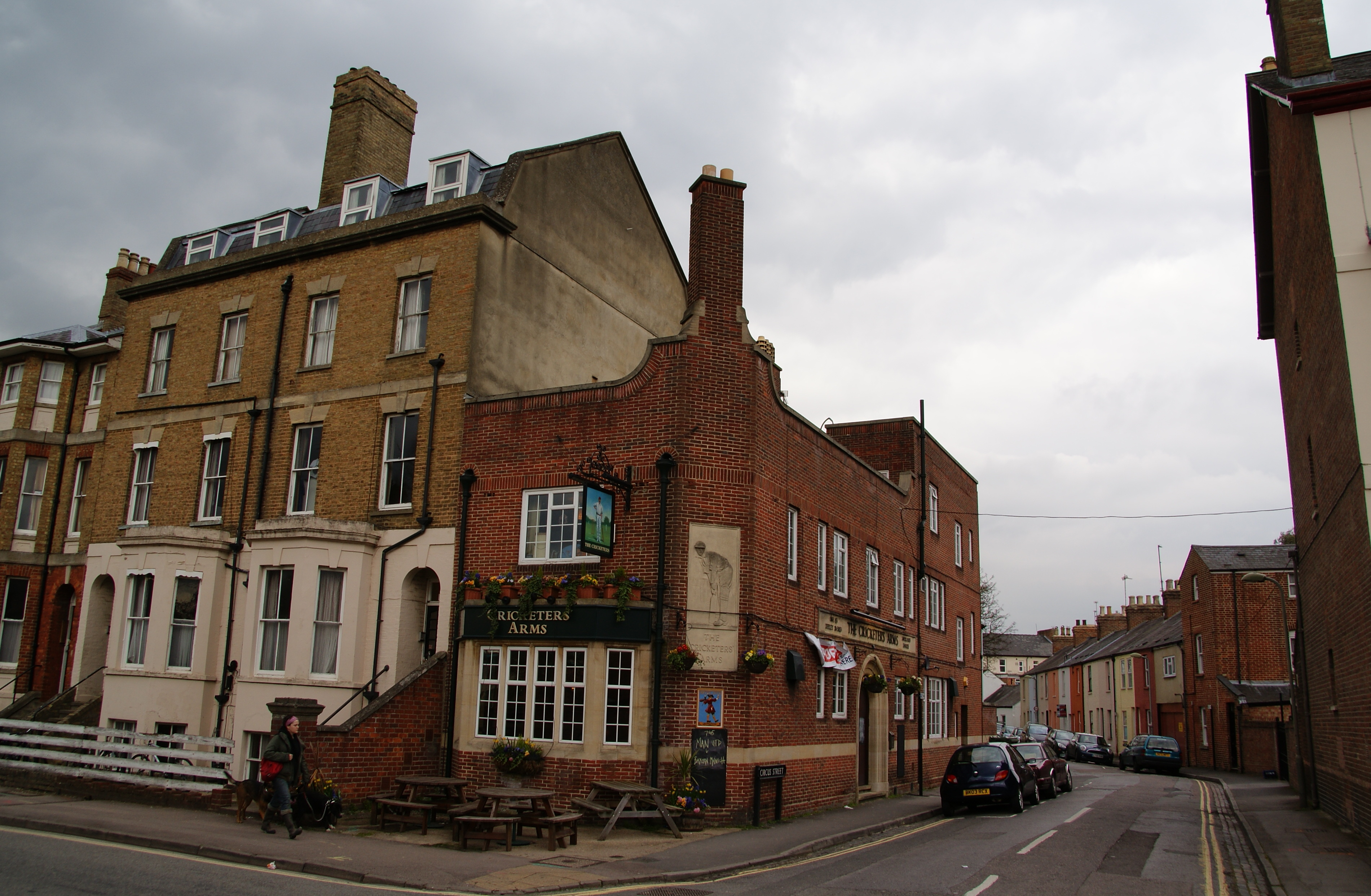
The Cricketers' Arms public house on Iffley Road.

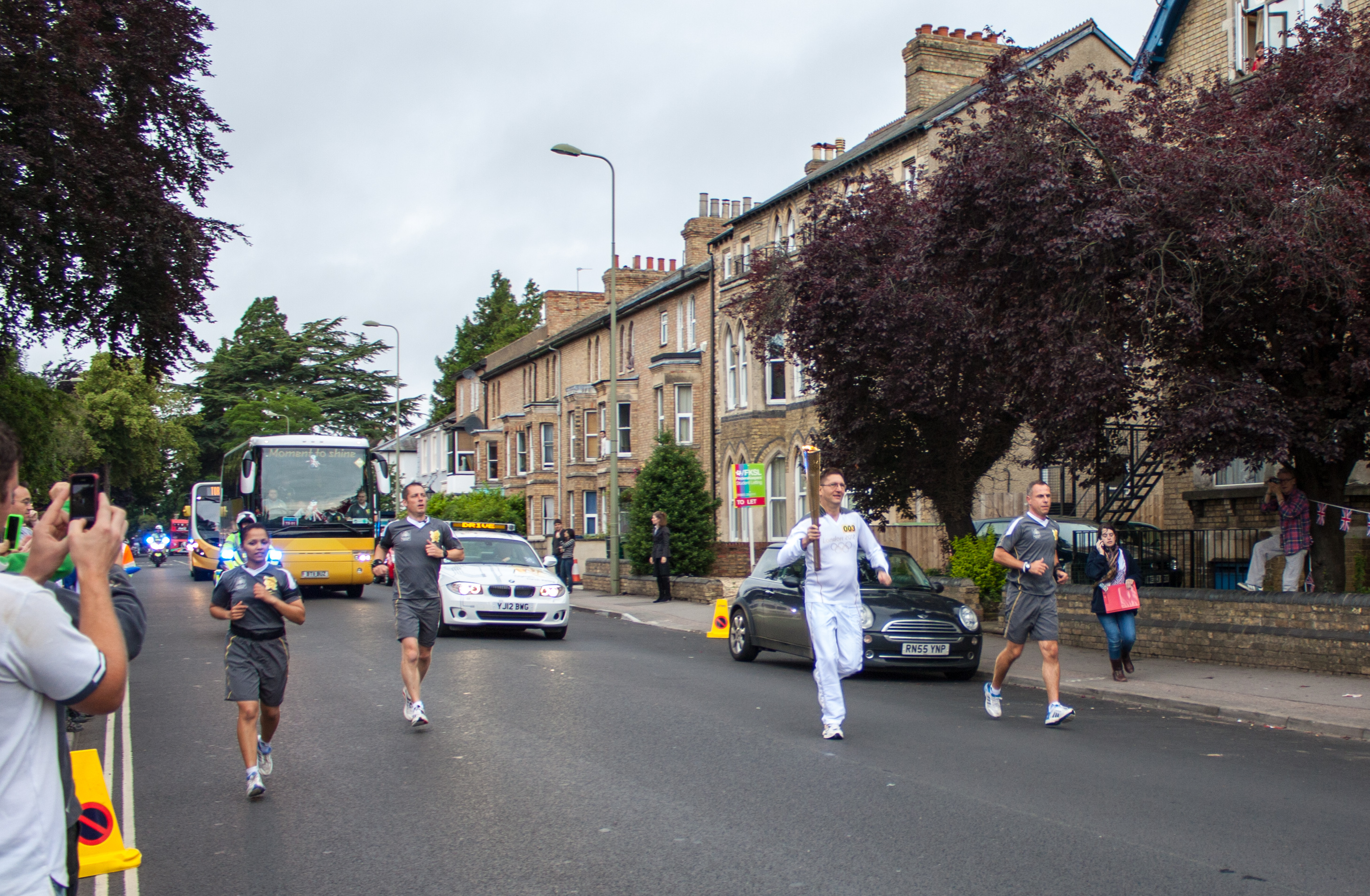
2012 Olympics Torch Relay on Iffley Road.
