= Kautokeino Airfield =

Kautokeino Airfield Kautokeino flyplass
- IATA: none; ICAO: ENKA

Summary
- Airport type: Private
- Owner: Norwegian Directorate of Public Construction and Property
- Serves: Kautokeino
- Location: Kautokeino, Finnmark, Norway
- Elevation AMSL: 355 m / 1,165 ft
- Coordinates: 69°02′25″N 023°02′03″E

Map
- Location in Norway

Runways
Direction	Length		Surface
Direction	m	ft	Surface
01–19	1,200	3,739	Gravel

Kautokeino Airfield (Norwegian: Kautokeino flyplass; ICAO: ENKA) is a general aviation aerodrome located in the village of Kautokeino in Kautokeino Municipality in Finnmark county, Norway. It consists of a 1,200-meter (3,900 ft) gravel runway, built by the Luftwaffe during World War II. It was rebuilt in 1958 by the Royal Norwegian Air Force to supply its radar station at Kautokeino. It is largely unused and is now owned by the Norwegian Directorate of Public Construction and Property and the Finnmark Estate. Local politicians have called for the aerodrome to be upgraded to a regional airport, but this has been rejected by Avinor.

== History ==
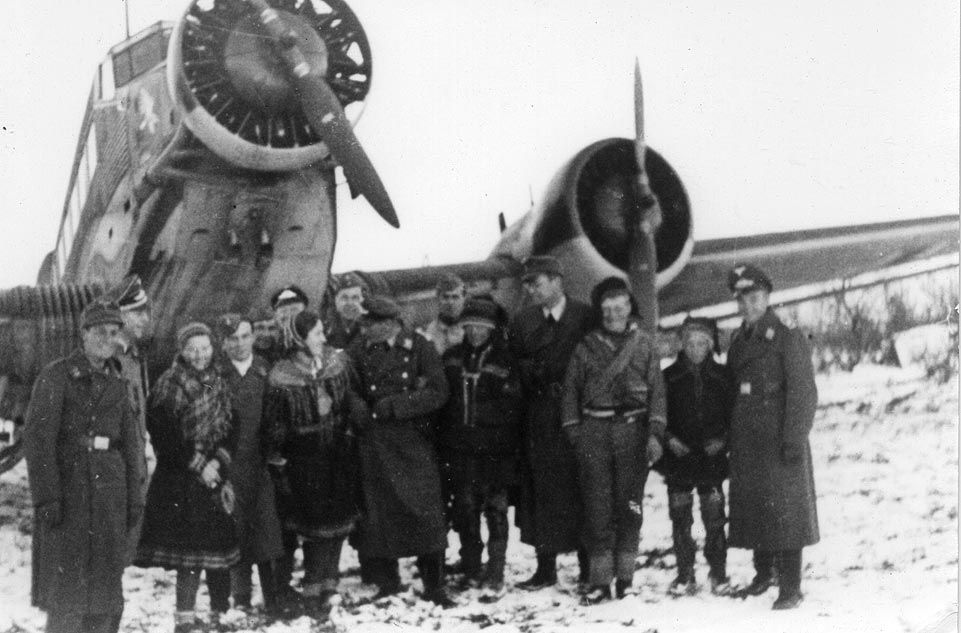
Junkers Ju 52 at Kautokeino during World War II

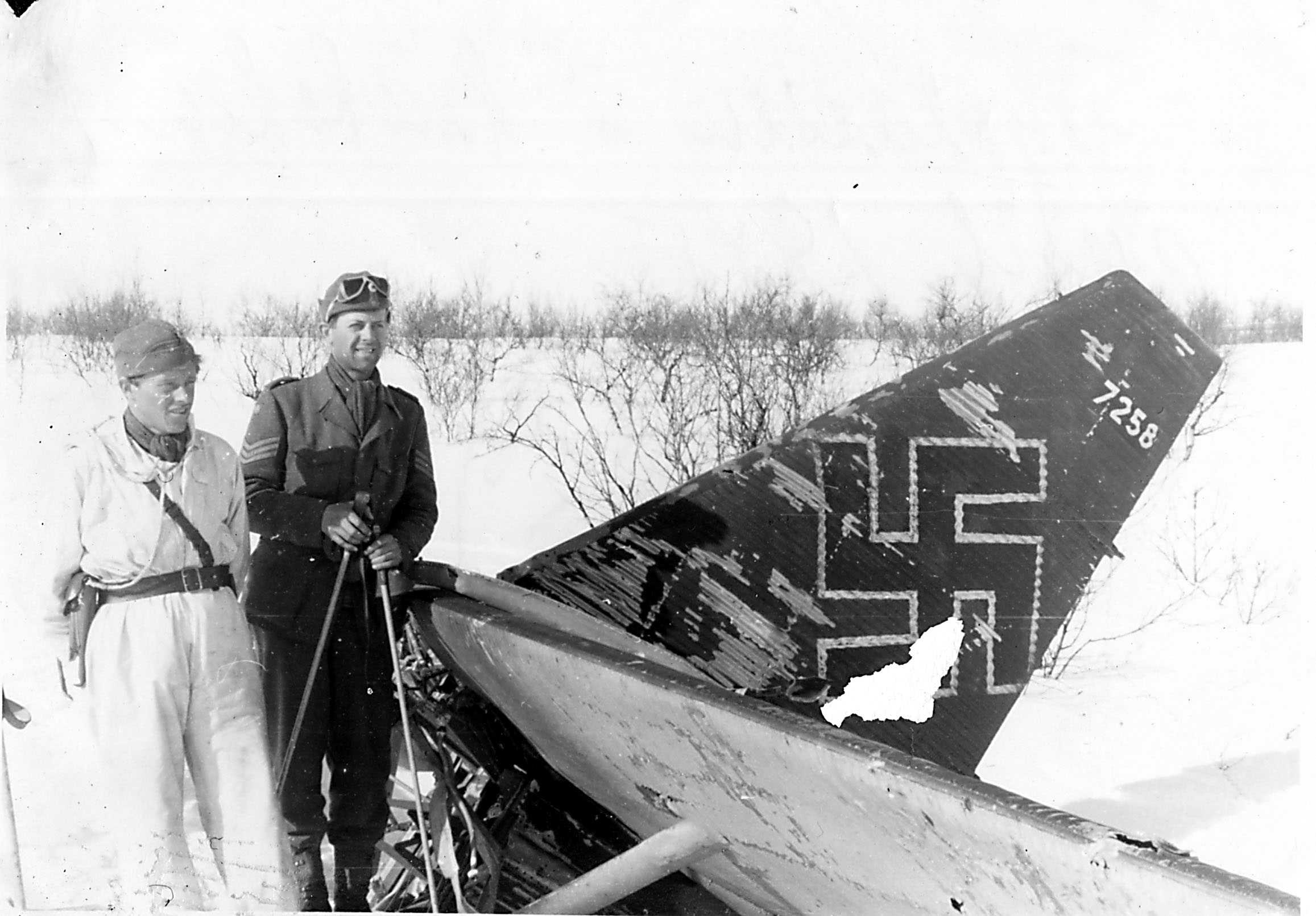
Norwegian soldiers with the wreck of a German aircraft at Kautokeino Airport in spring 1945

The airfield was built by the Luftwaffe as an emergency landing field during the early 1940s. It also hosted a detachment of reconnaissance aircraft. The Royal Norwegian Air Force established a radio station at Kautokeino in 1945. Transport to the new airfield was among other means carried out using seaplanes which used the Altaelva river to land. The station was upgraded in 1955 and received a radar and was designated as a reporting post. Its first upgrade took place in 1958, the same year as renovations of the airfield were carried out. The main users of the airfield were Twin Otters from Bodø Main Air Station. On occasion supplies would be dropped by parachute. Only once has a jet fighter landed here, even if the field is too short for them. In June 1970 an F5 landed and took off, then using a parachute and extra rockets. Enontekiö Airport in Finland started marketing itself as Enontekiö–Kautokeino Saami Airport from 2008, although Finavia does not use the term any more. Enontekiö is located 90 kilometers (56 mi) from Kautokeino.

Local politicians have proposed that Kautokeino Airfield be redeveloped as a regional airport. In 2007 a unison municipal council supported an upgrade to the airport. They cited that Kautokeino would receive a hotel from 2008 and that it would be necessary to have an airport to support the village's tourism industry. A secondary argument is that an upgraded airport could be used for an air ambulance service. Finnmark County Council voted with a single decisive vote in 2010 to work towards making Kautokeino Finnmark's twelfth regional airport.

== Facility ==
The airfield is located 3 kilometers (2 mi) north of the village centre, at an elevation of 355 meters (1,165 ft) above mean sea level in a flat area. It consists of a 1,200-by-40-meter (3,940 by 130 ft) gravel runway aligned 01–19 (roughly north–south). There is no regular traffic on the airfield. The aerodrome is owned by the Norwegian Directorate of Public Construction and Property, which leases the land from the Finnmark Estate.

== Future ==
Avinor, the agency responsible for running state-owned airports, conducted an analysis in 2012 of upgrading Kautokeino to a regional airport with a 1,199-meter (3,934 ft) runway. Kautokeino's population of 2,935 make an estimated 10,000 annual flights from Alta Airport, located 135 kilometers (84 mi) by road and 1 hour and 50 minutes from the village. Avinor studied two alternative services, one with three daily flights directly to Tromsø and one using the existing Dash 8 aircraft network. The latter would require a stop-over at Sørkjosen Airport before Tromsø, allowing for two daily services, or directly with only one. Either way this gives an average 20 daily passengers per direction. Such a route would need subsidies of about 10 million Norwegian krone per year (NOK).

Construction of an airport is estimated to cost NOK 530 million and have an annual operating cost of NOK 28 million. An economic analysis showed that the airport would have a negative net present value for society of NOK 1014 million, excluding operating subsidies for the airline. There is little time gain from the project as travellers to Oslo would have to fly via Sørkjosen to Tromsø and there change aircraft, instead of taking direct flights from Alta. Only passengers having Tromsø as destination would have a gain from an airport. Avinor has recommended not upgrading the Kautokeino Airport.

== Accidents and incidents ==
A Junkers Ju 52/3m transport aircraft of the Luftwaffe crashed at the airfield in 1944, resulting in a write-off.
