= Enontekiö Airport =

Enontekiö Airport Enontekiön lentoasema
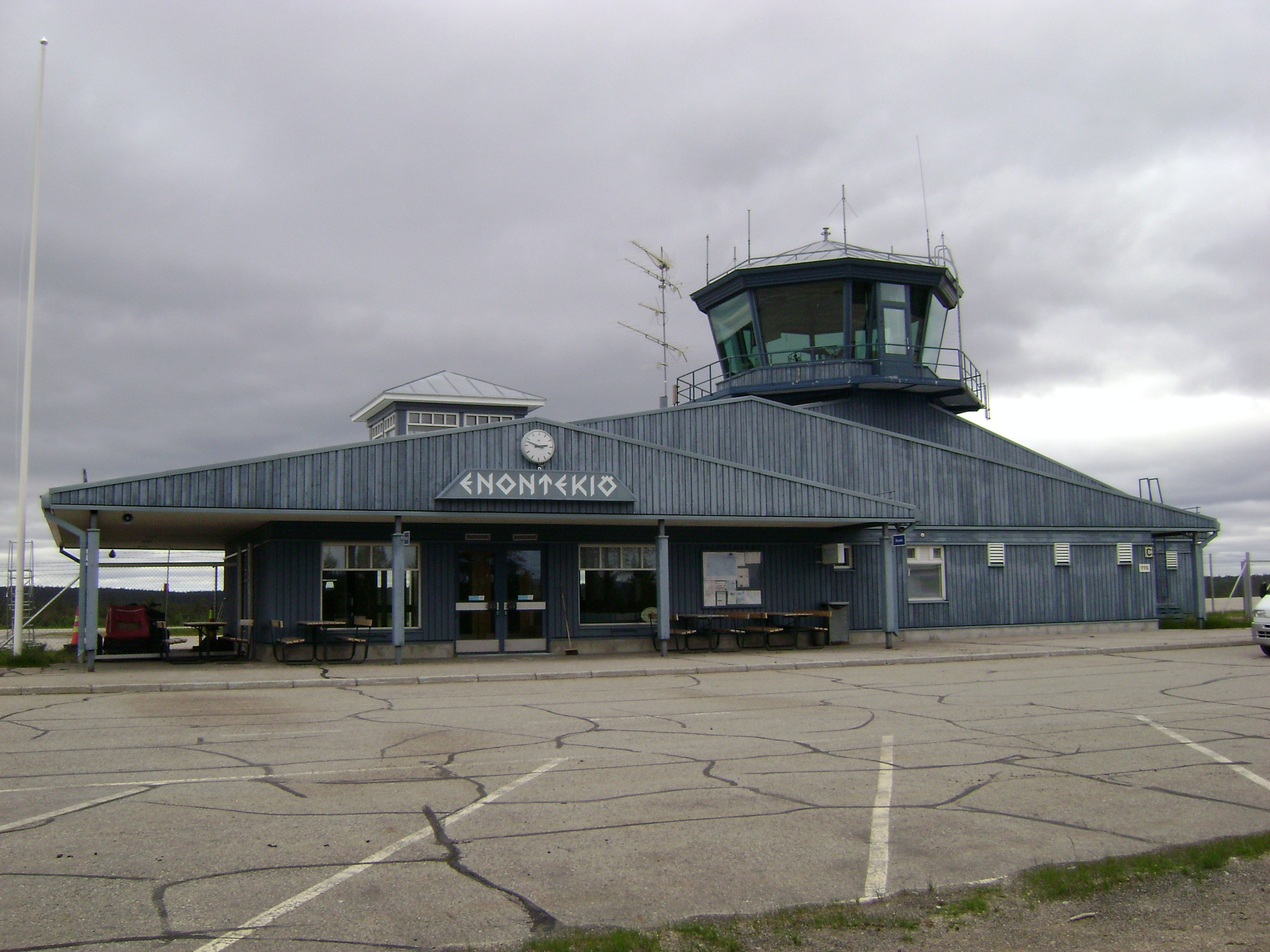
- IATA: ENF; ICAO: EFET

Summary
- Airport type: Public
- Operator: Municipality of Enontekiö
- Location: Enontekiö, Finland
- Elevation AMSL: 306 m (1,004 ft)
- Coordinates: 68°21′52″N 023°25′39″E
- Website: www.enf.fi

Map
- Location within Finland

Runways
Direction	Length		Surface
Direction	m	ft	Surface
03/21	2,001	6,565	Asphalt

Statistics (2017)
- Passengers: 25,537
- Landings: 80
- Source: AIP Finland; Statistics from Finavia

Enontekiö Airport (Finnish: Enontekiön lentoasema) (IATA: ENF, ICAO: EFET) is an airport located in Enontekiö, Finnish Lapland, 5 NM (9.3 km; 5.8 mi) west southwest of Hetta, the municipal centre of Enontekiö.

== Overview ==
In 2023, the airport had "almost 33,000" passengers.

It is mainly used for charter flights during the winter, particularly those of UK tour operator Transun, whose passengers account for 80% of the airport's passenger volume. Passengers on these flights are tourists coming to experience Lapland for the day or to enjoy a stay in the nearby villages of Hetta, Karesuando (Sweden) or Kautokeino (Norway). Regular flights to Enontekiö are established only in the spring and the autumn. In spring 2015 these flights were operated by Flybe Nordic. From autumn 2013 to spring 2014, the flights were operated by Air100. In 2012 and 2013, the spring flights to Helsinki-Vantaa were also provided by Flybe Nordic and before this by Finncomm Airlines. In December 2012, Enter Air operated special "Santa flights" to Enontekiö from various UK destinations on behalf of tour operator Transun and this service continued in following winters including trips with a week's stay. The nearest airport with daily flights is Kittilä Airport, 150 km road distance.

In August 2009, Finavia informed that the airport would be renamed as Enontekiö-Kautokeino Saami Airport. This was because Kautokeino in Norway (located 90 km from Enontekiö Airport) has no airport (except Kautokeino Airfield which has no scheduled service), and the nearest in Norway is 135 kilometers away. This name has been used a little in Norway, but not really by the airport.

The Municipality of Enontekiö has operated the airport since July 2021. The minimum temperature of −44.3 °C (−47.7 °F) was registered on January 4, 2024 in Enontekiö Airport, being the lowest temperature of the 21st century in Fennoscandia, according to weather historian Thierry Goose.

== Airlines and destinations ==
There are currently no scheduled operators flying from Enontekio Airport. Ad-hoc charters during winter operate from the United Kingdom.

Airlines	Destinations
Enter Air	Seasonal charter: Belfast–International, Birmingham, London–Gatwick, Glasgow, Humberside, Newcastle upon Tyne
Jet2.com	Seasonal charter: London–Stansted, Manchester, Newcastle upon Tyne

== Statistics ==
Annual passenger statistics
Year	Domestic	International	Total	Change
2005	669	13,028	13,697	−14.8% ▼
2006	545	16,868	17,413	+27.1% ▲
2007	856	24,230	25,086	+44.1% ▲
2008	772	20,473	21,245	−15.3% ▼
2009	814	16,869	17,683	−16.8% ▼
2010	848	15,175	16,023	−9.4% ▼
2011	721	17,517	18,282	+13.8% ▲
2012	1,282	20,000	21,282	+16.7% ▲
2013	1834	18,337	20,169	−5.2% ▼
2014	306	19,162	19,468	−3.5% ▼
2015	303	21,087	21,390	+9.9% ▲
2016	630	21,643	22,273	+4.4% ▲
2017	785	24,752	25,537	+14.7% ▲
2018	595	25,468	26,063	+2,9% ▲
2019	16	28,016	28,032	+7.6% ▲
2020	0	5,266	5,266	−81,2% ▼
2021	14	19,783	19,797	+275.9% ▲
2022	0	29,487	29,487	+48.9% ▲
2023	61	32,289	32,350	+9.7% ▲
2024	6	38,321	38,327	+18.5% ▲
2025	0	41,977	41,977	+9.5% ▲

== See also ==
- List of the largest airports in the Nordic countries
