= Transun =

Travel and holiday companies of the United Kingdom

- Industry: Tour operator
- Founded: 1982
- Headquarters: London, UK
- Key people: Paul Kostich, James Crawshaw
- Products: Travel experiences
- Website: http://www.transun.co.uk/

Transun is an independent tour operator established in 1982 and based in the UK.

== History ==
Transun was established in 1982 by Yugoslavian-born Paul Kostich, who founded the company at the age of 30. He had started working as a tour guide in India, East Africa, China, and Thailand at the age of 18, and was working in the airline industry in London when he founded Transun. He began with offering tours to Yugoslavia, then diversified into a number of different excursions throughout Europe. He now serves as the company’s President.

The company grew throughout the 1990s and early 2000s to include travel experiences and day trips to destinations such as Lapland, Cairo, Marrakesh, Bergen, and Florence. They also began establishing relationships with airports throughout the UK in order to charter flights to these and other destinations. In the mid-1990s, Transun was the first operator to run flights to New York from regional UK airports such as Leeds Bradford, Belfast, Aberdeen and Liverpool. The company received special attention at the World Travel Market in 2002 for its travel offerings to Thailand, receiving a visit from Her Royal Highness Princess Ubolratana of the kingdom of Thailand, as well as Thailand’s Minister of Tourism Sontaya Kunplome. Both were interested in Transun’s focus on Koh Samui as a primary destination for the company’s travel packages.

In the late 1990s and early 2000s Transun promoted tourism to the territories impacted by the Yugoslav Wars. The company promoted travel to places in the Balkans such as Croatia and Slovenia, and joined other operators in criticizing the Croatia National Tourist Office for its lack of support. Their efforts became a topic of several academic studies of tourism in the region.

Transun opened offices in Leeds and London, but later closed those locations in 2005 as part of a reorganization preceding the global recession. They currently have offices in Oxford, Bangkok, and Koh Samui in Thailand.

== Lapland ==
Transun’s UK company is known as a ‘Lapland specialist’ and is licensed by the Civil Aviation Authority (United Kingdom) to operate flights to Lapland. Many of the holidays focus on seeing the Northern Lights or visiting Santa in the resorts of Karesuando, Kilpisjarvi, Hetta and the Pallas-Yllästunturi National Park in the north west of Finland.

The company currently operates the largest number of flights to Lapland direct from the UK and charter flights run from small UK regional airports such as Norwich, Exeter and Humberside as well as the larger 'hubs' of Manchester and Gatwick.

In the winter of 2019, Transun’s tourism flights account for 88% of 28,000 passengers travelling through Enontekio Airport. In 2019, the airport’s operator, state-owned Finavia, announced that the airport would be closing because the volume of traffic did not justify the needed runway repairs which were estimated to cost €15 million. In 2020, the decision to close the airport was confirmed which led to criticism by many politicians and groups, including the mayor of Enontekio and Finland’s Minister of Finance Katri Kulmuni, since much of the local economy was dependent on tourism generated by the airport. Transun’s director James Crawshaw criticized Finavia for not developing the airport in previous years and reported that a breakdown in their relationship had meant Transun had operated flights to nearby Kiruna Airport and Tromsø Airport instead of Enontekio. Later that summer, Finland’s government assigned funds for the renovation of the runway and agreed that Finavia could sell the airport to the municipality of Enontekio which would operate it, making it the first commercial airport in Finland not operated by Finavia. Finavia, however, insisted that it would not use the funds from the central government to repair the runway because the finances were granted for ‘Lapland airports’ generally, and not Enontekio specifically. Crawshaw called upon Finavia’s CEO Kimmo Mäki to resign, and after an intervention from the office of Finland’s Prime Minister Sanna Marin, Finavia agreed to repair the runway in part and sell the airport to the municipality of Enontekio for an undisclosed amount.
