= Ounastunturi =

Fell in Lapland, Finland

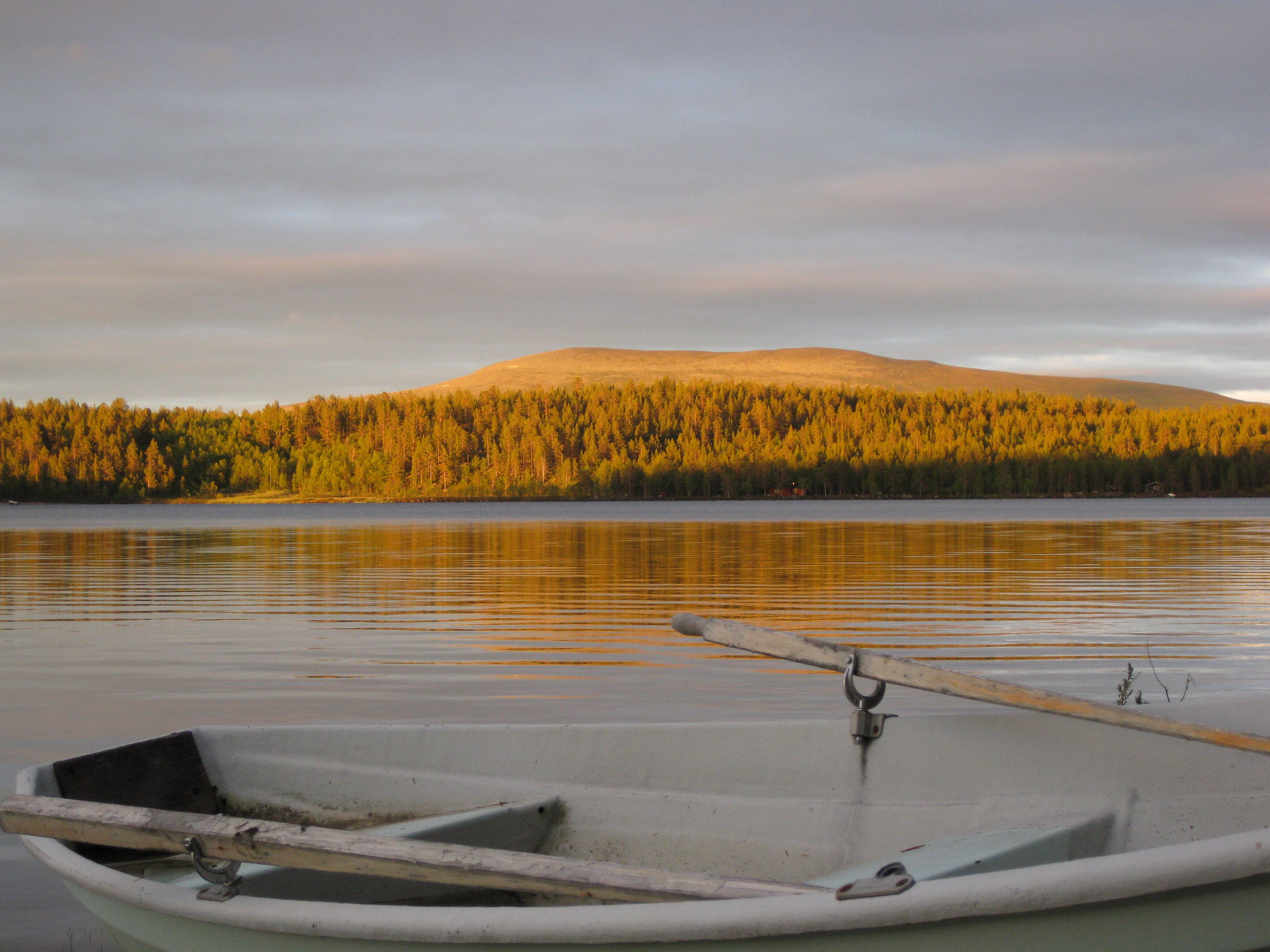
- Ounastunturi seen across Ounasjärvi

Highest point
- Peak: Outtakka
- Elevation: 725 m (2,379 ft)
- Coordinates: 68°14′N 23°48′E

Geography
- Location within Finland
- Location: Enontekiö
- Country: Finland
- Landskap: Lappland
- Sub-region: Tunturi Lapland
- Parent range: Pallastunturi–Ounastunturi massif
- Biome: boreal forest

Ounastunturi is a fell in Finland. It is situated in the sub-region Tunturi Lapland of the Lapland region, in the north of the country, about 900 km (560 mi) north of the capital Helsinki. It lies in the northern part of the Pallas-Yllästunturi National Park. The Pallas-Ounastunturi National Park, established in 1938 and included in the former in 2005, was partly named after the fell. Ounastunturi is separated from the neighbouring Pallastunturi fell in the south by the Hannukuru valley.

The nearest large lake is Ounasjärvi, north of the fell. The highest summit is Outtakka with a height of 723 m a.s.l. in the southern part of the fell (68.2339°N 23.8278°E), followed by Pyhäkero with a height of 713 m a.s.l. in the north (68.3253°N 23.7711°E). North of Ounastunturi and the valley containing Ounasjärvi lake the terrain rises towards the highest parts of Finland, towards the south beyond Pallastunturi, it is comparatively flat.

The region around Ounastunturi is almost uninhabited with less than 2 people per square kilometer. The nearest larger settlement is Enontekiö 16.6 km (10.3 mi) north of the mountain. The vegetation is sparse and consists mostly of low subarctic woodland.

The fell is in the subarctic climate zone with a mean annual temperature of -4 °C. The warmest month is July with an average temperature of 14 °C, the coldest is February with a mean temperature of -18 °C.
