= Pöyrisjärvi =

Lake in Finland

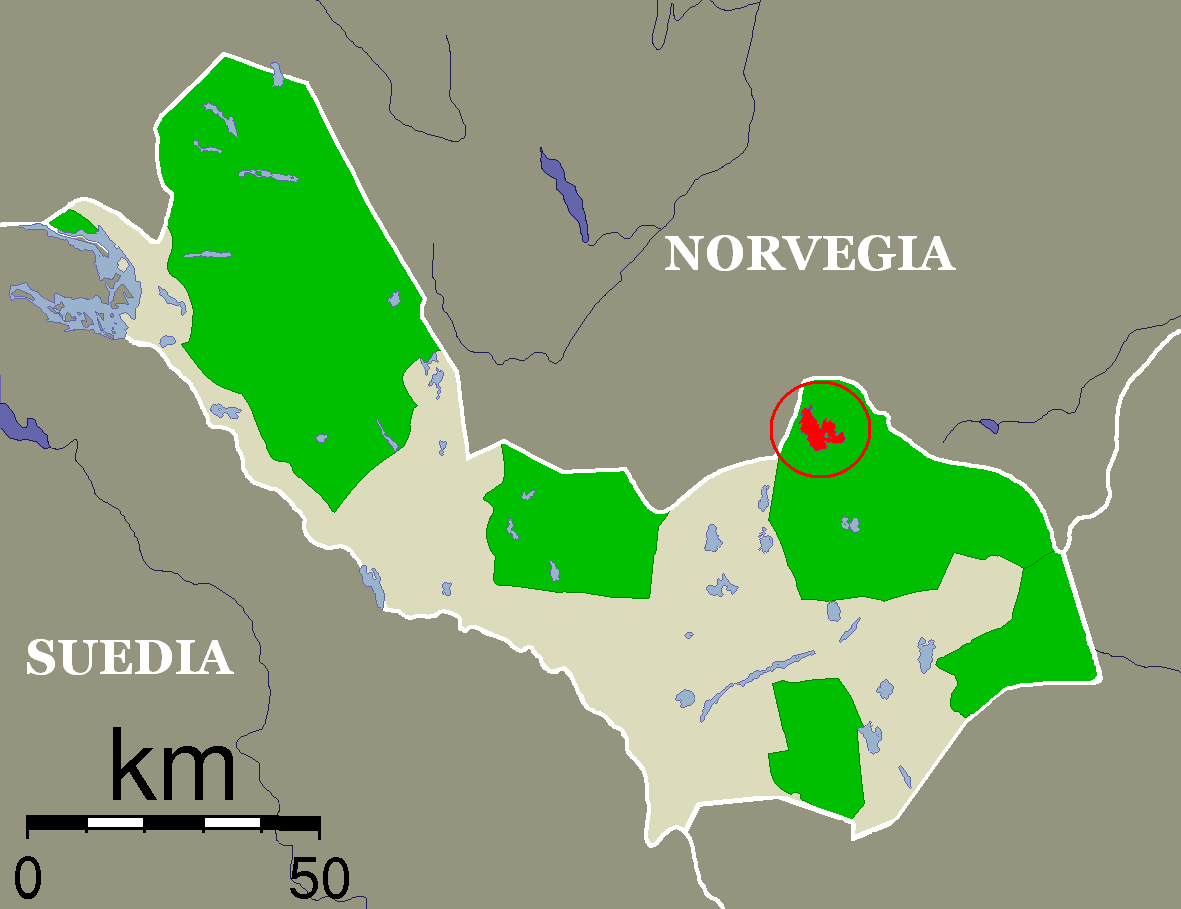
- Pöyrisjärvi Lake in the Enontekiö Municipality is marked in red

- Location within Finland
- Location: Enontekiö Municipality
- Coordinates: 68°43′N 23°50′E
- Type: Lake
- Primary outflows: Pöyrisjoki
- Catchment area: Kemijoki
- Basin countries: Finland, Norway
- Max. length: 6.2 km (3.9 mi)
- Max. width: 3.9 km (2.4 mi)
- Surface area: 15.05 km^{2} (5.81 sq mi)
- Surface elevation: 418.1 m (1,372 ft)
- Islands: 12
- Settlements: Enontekiö

Pöyrisjärvi a medium-sized lake in the Kemijoki main catchment area in the Enontekiö municipality of Finland, close to the border with Norway.

== See also ==
- List of lakes in Finland
