= Kelottijärvi =

- Village
- Interactive map of Kelottijärvi
- Country: Finland
- Province: Lapland
- Municipality: Enontekiö

Kelottijärvi is a village and lake in the municipality of Enontekiö in Lapland in northwestern Finland.

Kelottijärvi
- Location within Lapland
- Location: Sweden/ Enontekiö, Lapland, Finland
- Coordinates: 68.523333°N 21.989722°E
- Basin countries: Sweden, Finland
