= Vuontisjärvi =

Lake in Finland

- Location within Lapland
- Coordinates: 68°26′0″N 23°59′25″E
- Primary inflows: Pöyrisjoki
- Primary outflows: Vuontisjoki
- Catchment area: Kemijoki
- Basin countries: Finland, Norway
- Max. length: 2.3 km (1.4 mi)
- Max. width: 0.6 km (0.37 mi)
- Shore length^{1}: 6.52 km (4.05 mi)
- Surface elevation: 304.6 m (999 ft)
- Islands: 0
- Settlements: Enontekiö
- ^{1} Shore length is not a well-defined measure.

Vuontisjärvi
- Village
- Interactive map of Vuontisjärvi
- Coordinates: 68°26′18″N 24°00′37″E
- Country: Finland
- Municipality: Enontekiö
- Province: Lapland

Population
  - Total: 118
- Time zone: UTC+2 (CET)
  - Summer (DST): UTC+3 (CEST)

Vuontisjärvi (Finnish: [ˈʋuo̯ntisˌjærʋi]; Northern Sami: Vuottesjávri) is a small lake and a village located in Finnish Lapland. It belongs to Kemijoki main catchment area.

The area of the lake was reduced greatly in 1861. During the spring flood the waters escaped through a ditch dug by a local man, and a new river formed. The new water level is six metres below the original.

== See also ==
- List of lakes in Finland
