= Enontekiö =

Enontekiö Enontekiö (Finnish) Eanodat (Northern Sami) Iänudâh (Inari Sami) Jeänõk (Skolt Sami) Enontekis (Swedish)
- Municipality
- Enontekiön kunta (Finnish); Eanodaga gielda (Northern Sami); Enontekis kommun (Swedish)
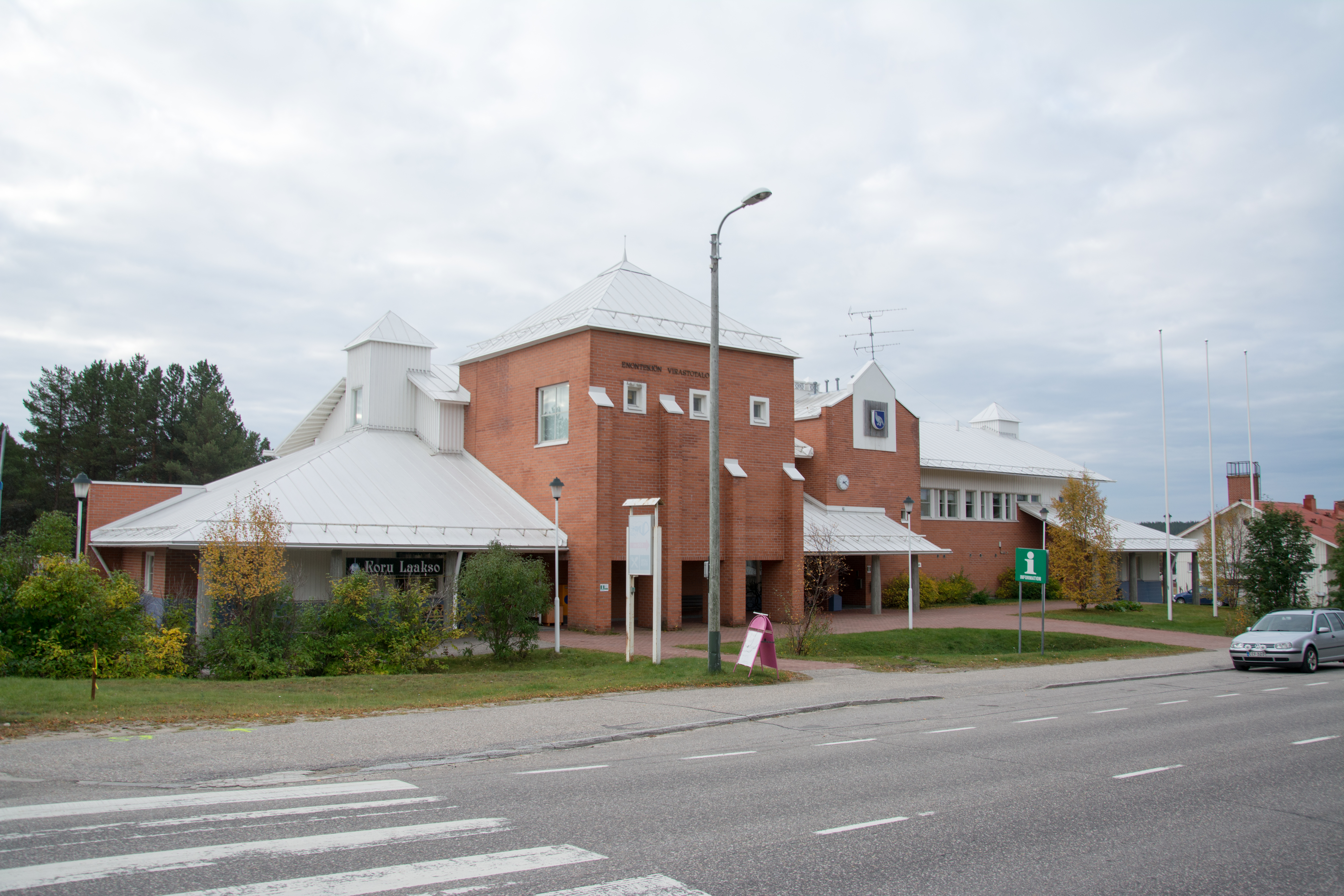

- Coat of arms
- Nickname: Arm of Finland
- Location of Enontekiö in Finland
- Interactive map of Enontekiö
- Coordinates: 68°23′05″N 023°38′20″E
- Country: Finland
- Region: Lapland
- Sub-region: Fell Lapland
- Founded (parish): 1747
- Charter: 1877
- Seat: Hetta

Government
  - Municipality manager: Pentti Keskitalo

Area (2018-01-01)
  - Total: 8,391.35 km^{2} (3,239.92 sq mi)
  - Land: 7,953.42 km^{2} (3,070.83 sq mi)
  - Water: 445.84 km^{2} (172.14 sq mi)
  - Rank: 4th largest in Finland

Population (2025-12-31)
  - Total: 1,769
  - Rank: 267th largest in Finland
  - Density: 0.22/km^{2} (0.57/sq mi)
- 1

Population by native language
  - Finnish: 85% (official)
  - Swedish: 0.8%
  - Sami: 10.2%
  - Others: 4%

Population by age
  - 0 to 14: 12.5%
  - 15 to 64: 58.3%
  - 65 or older: 29.2%
- Time zone: UTC+02:00 (EET)
  - Summer (DST): UTC+03:00 (EEST)
- Website: www.enontekio.fi

Enontekiö (Finnish: [ˈenontekiø]; Northern Sami: Eanodat [ˈe̯anoðah(t)]; Swedish: Enontekis; Inari Sami: Iänudâh; Skolt Sami: Jeänõk) is a municipality in the Finnish part of Lapland with approximately 1,800 inhabitants. It is situated in the outermost northwest of the country and occupies a large and very sparsely populated area of about 8,400 square kilometres (3,200 sq mi) between the Swedish and Norwegian border. Finland's highest point, the Halti fell, with a height of 1,324 metres (4,344 ft) above the mean sea level, is situated in the north of Enontekiö. The municipality shares borders with regions of Sweden and Norway that encompass the Scandinavian Mountains. The administrative centre of Enontekiö is the village of Hetta. About one fifth of the community's population are Sami people. Enontekiö's main industries are tourism and reindeer husbandry.

== Geography ==
=== Location and dimensions ===
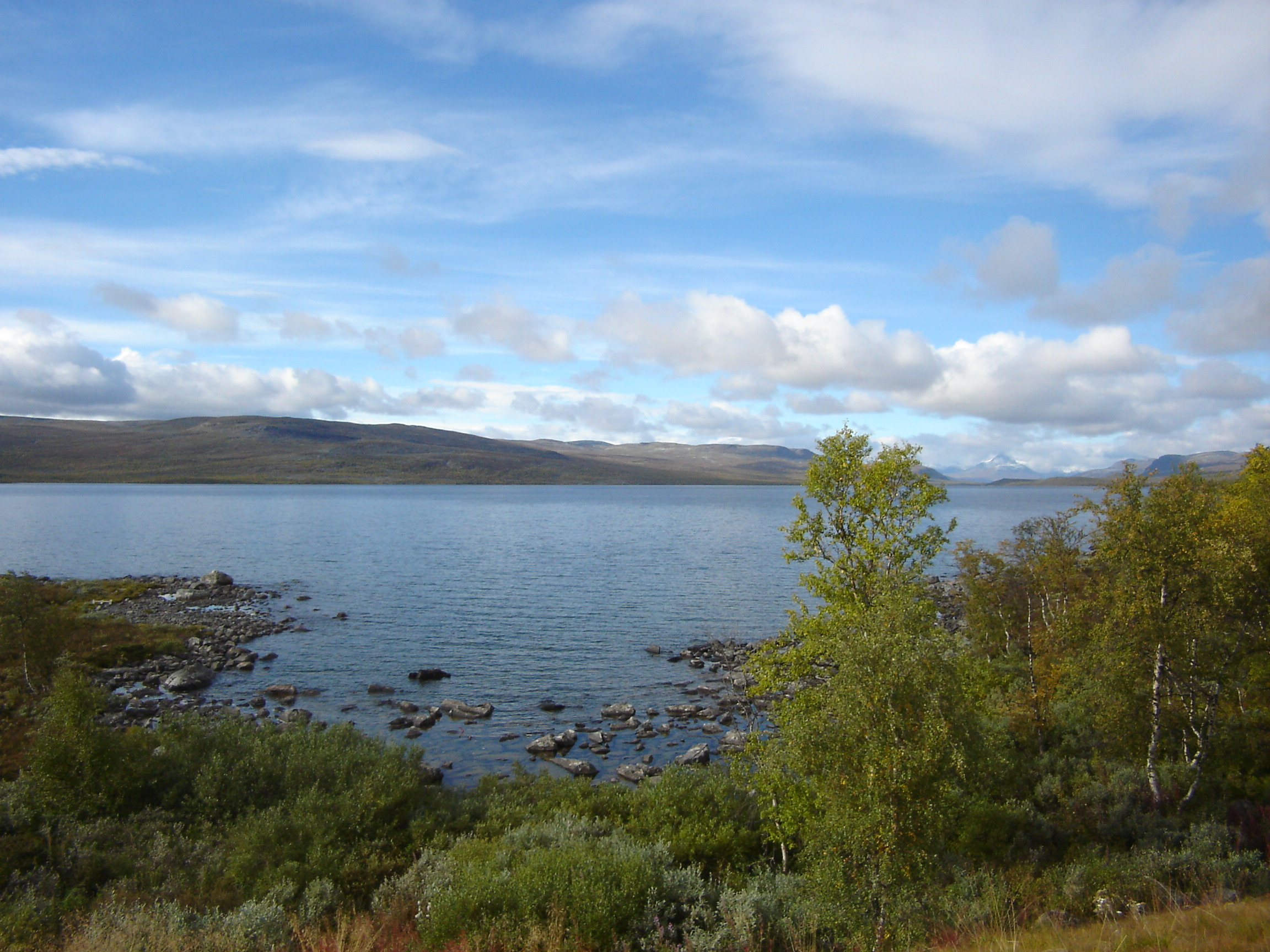
Kilpisjärvi Lake

Enontekiö is located in the region of Lapland in the outermost northwest tip of Finland. The salient between the Swedish and Norwegian borders, which is occupied by the municipality of Enontekiö, is called Käsivarsi (Finnish for "arm"), because before World War II, Finland's borders had the shape of a woman's figure (Suomi-neito) and the area looked like her raised right arm. The municipality occupies a large and sparsely populated area of 8,391.35 km^{2} (3,239.92 sq mi) (more than three times the area of Luxembourg). Thus Enontekiö is Finland's third-largest municipality in size, after Inari and Sodankylä, and with a population density of only 0.22/km^{2} (0.57/sq mi), it is the second-most sparsely populated municipality, after Savukoski.

Enontekiö's neighbouring municipalities are Inari in the east, Kittilä in the southeast, and Muonio in the south; on the Swedish side in the west, there is Kiruna Municipality and on the Norwegian side in the north, there are Storfjord Municipality, Gáivuotna Municipality (also known as Kåfjord), Nordreisa Municipality, and Kautokeino Municipality. Enontekiö shares a border of more than 450 kilometres (280 mi) with the two adjacent nations. The border to Sweden is formed by the river Muonionjoki and its tributary, Könkämäeno.

=== Villages ===
The main village of Enontekiö is the settlement of Hetta in the south, with approx. 530 inhabitants. There is no village with the name of Enontekiö, but Hetta is often called the municipality's name. Other important places are the village of Kilpisjärvi, which is located near the border triangle of Finland-Sweden-Norway, as well as Karesuvanto and Palojoensuu, both of which are located at the Muonionjoki at the Swedish border. Enontekiö's villages are concentrated in the southern area and along the banks of the rivers Könkämäeno and Muonionjoki in the west of the municipality. Often, there is a corresponding village on the Swedish side of the river, bearing the same name (or the Swedish form of the name), e.g. Karesuvanto/Karesuando. In contrast, the part of the Käsivarsi Mountains away from the rivers is almost completely uninhabited.

The following villages belong to Enontekiö (Sami name, if available, in parentheses):

- Hetta (Heahttá)
- Jatuni (Jáhton)
- Karesuvanto (Gárasavvon)
- Kelottijärvi (Gelojávri)
- Ketomella
- Kilpisjärvi (Gilbbesjávri)
- Kultima (Gulddán)
- Kuttanen (Guhttás)
- Leppäjärvi (Leaibejávri)
- Luspa (Luspi)
- Markkina (Boaresmárkan)
- Maunu (Mávdna)
- Muotkajärvi (Muotkejávri)
- Näkkälä (Neahčil)
- Nartteli
- Nunnanen (Njunnás)
- Palojärvi (Bálojávri)
- Palojoensuu (Bálojohnjálbmi)
- Peltovuoma (Bealdovuopmi)
- Raittijärvi
- Ropinsalmi
- Saivomuotka (Sáivomuotki)
- Sonkamuotka
- Vähäniva
- Vuontisjärvi (Vuottesjávri)
- Yli-Kyrö

=== Topography ===
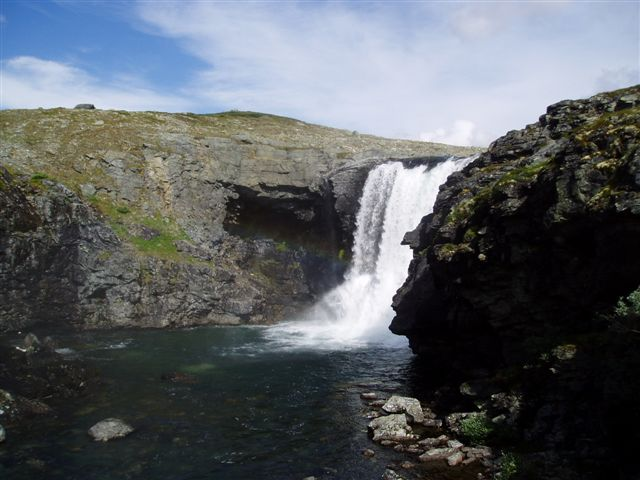
Pitsusköngäs, a plunge-type waterfall in Enontekiö.

In its northern region, Enontekiö shares borders with areas of Sweden and Norway in which segments of the Scandinavian Mountains are located. Through that and through its location in the far north of Finland, it is geologically and scenically very different from the rest of the country. Halti, the highest mountain of Finland with a height of 1,324 m, is located in Enontekiö, together with all 21 other mountains higher than 1,000 m (3,281 ft) in the country. Besides Haltitunturi, probably the best known and scenically most distinctive mountain is the Saana with a height of 1,029 metres (3,376 ft), which rises above the village of Kilpisjärvi. The southern part of the municipality is less mountainous, but some single fjells (tunturi, which means hills towering above the timber line) rise above the otherwise rather flat surrounding area. Below, a part of the Pallastunturi–Ounastunturi-massif extends into Enontekiö's territory.

A little more than 5% of the municipality's area consists of water. Several large rivers originate in Enontekiö: The Muonionjoki, Ounasjoki, Ivalojoki, and one of the headstreams of the Tenojoki have their sources in the municipality. Enontekiö owes its name to them: Eno is an old Finnish word for "major river" cognate with the Northern Sámi word Eatnu or "large river, largest river (in a specific region)" and tekiö is derived from the Northern Sámi derivational suffix -dat which forms abstract nouns. All of the 825 lakes in the area are rather small. The largest lakes are the Pöyrisjärvi, the Kilpisjärvi near the village with the same name, and the Ounasjärvi near Hetta.

=== Flora and fauna ===
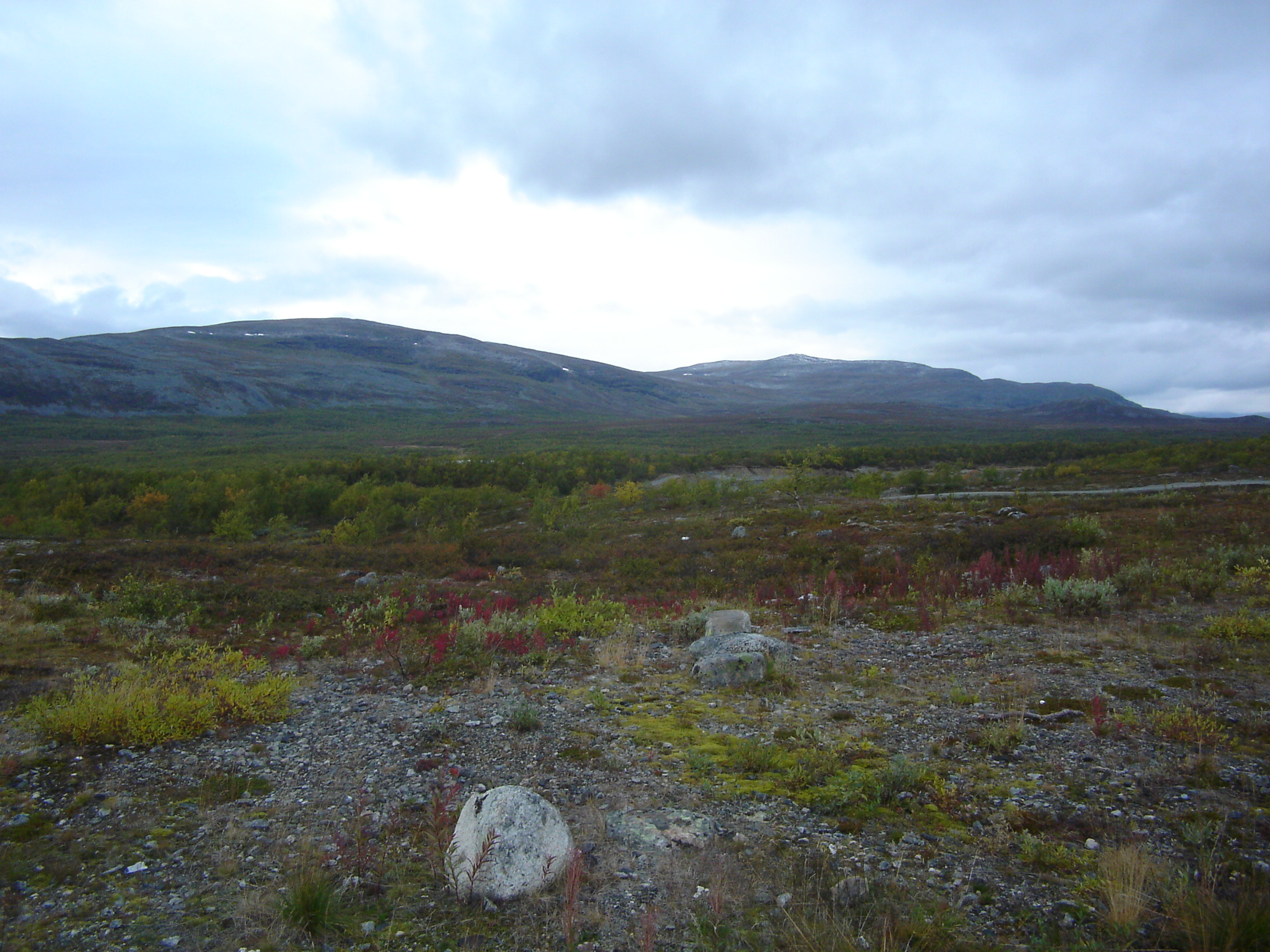
In the northern area of the municipality, the vegetation is very sparse.

The vegetation of Enontekiö is very meagre, due to the extreme northern latitude. The northern border of the natural geographic range of the spruce approx. matches the southern border of the municipality; the range of the pine ends only 20 km (12 mi) north of Hetta, too. North of that, only birches grow. The timber line is approximately 600 m (2,000 ft); above that, a tundra-like vegetation predominates. Heaths extends above timber line.

The lower heathlands are dominated by shrubs such as Betula nana, Vaccinium myrtillus and Empetrum hermaphroditum, whereas in the fjell heaths at higher elevations Salix herbacea, Empetrum and alpine grasses with lichens and mosses occur. In the mountains of the north-west Cassiope tetragona is abundant. The largest part of the municipal area consists of these plateaus or bogs, which mainly predominate at the rivers. Only 19% of Enontekiö's area is afforested. About 70% of the total area is conservation area of various grades. Enontekiö contains parts of the Pallas-Yllästunturi National Park, as well as the wilderness areas of Käsivarsi, Pulju, Pöyrisjärvi and Tarvantovaara.

Due to the harsh climatic conditions, there are not especially many species among Enontekiö's fauna; however, there are Arctic species that are unknown to southern Finland, e.g. Norway lemming, Arctic fox, snowy owl, Eurasian dotterel, ptarmigan, and ring ouzel. Besides the semi-domesticated reindeer, there are a lot of small mammals and bird species.

=== Climate ===
Enontekiö's climate is characterised by the extreme northern location, the high altitude compared to the rest of Finland and the closeness of the Arctic Ocean. Due to the moderating influence of the Gulf Stream, the winters are not quite as harsh as in central Lapland, which is characterised by the continental climate, but the summers are shorter and cooler.

The annual average temperatures of Enontekiö are the lowest of Finland. In Kilpisjärvi, in the north of the municipal area, the long-term average is −2.3 °C (compared to Helsinki: approx. +5 °C; Berlin approx. +9 °C). July is the warmest month, with an average temperature of +10.9 °C, the coldest is January with −13.6 °C. Due to these extreme climatic conditions, the growing season only lasts a little over 100 days. Thus, the winter, with its 200 days, is very long. The annual average precipitation is 459 millimetres (18.1 in). In the cold season, enormous amounts of snow can fall: The highest snow depth ever recorded in Finland was measured on 19 April 1997, in Kilpisjärvi: 190 centimetres (75 in). Normally, a permanent snow cover is generally formed in October and does not melt again until the end of May. In sheltered places, snow can remain even longer; thus a ski race is traditionally held for Midsummer's night in Kilpisjärvi.

Enontekiö's municipal area is located between 200 and 300 km north of the Arctic Circle. Accordingly, there are extreme seasonal differences in the length of daylight. In Kilpisjärvi, the Midnight Sun shines between 22 May and 23 July. Accordingly, Polar night (kaamos) prevails between 2 December and 11 January. Enontekiö has the highest rate of occurrence of Polar lights in Finland: In the region around Kilpisjärvi, this natural spectacle can be observed on average three out of four nights during the dark season in clear weather.

Climate data for Enontekiö Kilpisjärvi kyläkeskus (1991–2020 normals, extremes 1979- present)
| Month | Jan | Feb | Mar | Apr | May | Jun | Jul | Aug | Sep | Oct | Nov | Dec | Year |
|---|---|---|---|---|---|---|---|---|---|---|---|---|---|
| Record high °C (°F) | 7.2 (45.0) | 6.7 (44.1) | 8.2 (46.8) | 12.7 (54.9) | 26.1 (79.0) | 26.6 (79.9) | 28.3 (82.9) | 26.7 (80.1) | 20.2 (68.4) | 12.9 (55.2) | 10.7 (51.3) | 6.8 (44.2) | 28.3 (82.9) |
| Mean maximum °C (°F) | 2.1 (35.8) | 2.1 (35.8) | 3.6 (38.5) | 7.5 (45.5) | 14.0 (57.2) | 20.3 (68.5) | 23.0 (73.4) | 21.4 (70.5) | 16.1 (61.0) | 9.1 (48.4) | 4.2 (39.6) | 3.4 (38.1) | 24.1 (75.4) |
| Mean daily maximum °C (°F) | −7.7 (18.1) | −7.9 (17.8) | −4.2 (24.4) | 0.9 (33.6) | 6.2 (43.2) | 12.2 (54.0) | 16.2 (61.2) | 14.3 (57.7) | 9.1 (48.4) | 2.0 (35.6) | −3.2 (26.2) | −5.8 (21.6) | 2.7 (36.9) |
| Daily mean °C (°F) | −12.2 (10.0) | −12.3 (9.9) | −8.8 (16.2) | −3.5 (25.7) | 2.3 (36.1) | 7.7 (45.9) | 11.6 (52.9) | 10.1 (50.2) | 5.7 (42.3) | −0.5 (31.1) | −6.5 (20.3) | −10.1 (13.8) | −1.4 (29.5) |
| Mean daily minimum °C (°F) | −17.3 (0.9) | −17.4 (0.7) | −14.1 (6.6) | −8.3 (17.1) | −1.4 (29.5) | 3.8 (38.8) | 7.9 (46.2) | 6.8 (44.2) | 2.9 (37.2) | −3.0 (26.6) | −10.0 (14.0) | −14.7 (5.5) | −5.4 (22.3) |
| Mean minimum °C (°F) | −33.0 (−27.4) | −32.1 (−25.8) | −29.1 (−20.4) | −22.8 (−9.0) | −9.6 (14.7) | −0.8 (30.6) | 2.7 (36.9) | 0.7 (33.3) | −3.1 (26.4) | −11.7 (10.9) | −22.3 (−8.1) | −29.3 (−20.7) | −36.0 (−32.8) |
| Record low °C (°F) | −44.3 (−47.7) | −41.0 (−41.8) | −37.7 (−35.9) | −31.0 (−23.8) | −22.0 (−7.6) | −4.3 (24.3) | −0.7 (30.7) | −1.9 (28.6) | −8.5 (16.7) | −24.0 (−11.2) | −34.6 (−30.3) | −39.1 (−38.4) | −44.3 (−47.7) |
| Average precipitation mm (inches) | 52 (2.0) | 39 (1.5) | 37 (1.5) | 27 (1.1) | 28 (1.1) | 49 (1.9) | 73 (2.9) | 50 (2.0) | 38 (1.5) | 37 (1.5) | 36 (1.4) | 49 (1.9) | 516 (20.3) |
| Average precipitation days | 11 | 10 | 8 | 6 | 7 | 8 | 10 | 8 | 8 | 9 | 9 | 11 | 105 |
Source 1: FMI climatological normals for Finland 1991-2020
Source 2: Record highs and lows 1979- present

== History ==
=== Prehistory and Swedish age ===
The first human settlement in Enontekiö emerged after the retreat of the glaciers at the end of the last ice age, when people of the Komsa culture migrated from the coast of the Arctic Ocean. The oldest traces of settlement were found at the shores of the Ounasjärvi Lake and are dated to a time 6,000 BC. Later, the Sami population of Lapland, which predominated for a long time in Enontekiö, developed by the blending of this stone-age ancestral population with speakers of Uralic languages, who immigrated after the 3rd millennium BC. Initially, the inhabitants of Enontekiö made their living from hunting and fishing, and they had only a few reindeer as draught animals.

In early modern times, Enontekiö came under Swedish influence during the course of the Christianisation of the shamanistic Sami. In the 16th century, Enontekiö's first church was built. It was a small wooden building in the village of Rounala on the right shore (today in Sweden) of the Könkämäeno river. According to tradition, the church was erected by three Sami brothers who had converted to Christianity. It was a central meeting point, where Sami people gathered for religious ceremonies, where merchants travelled to sell their wares, and where Swedish officials held judicial courts at particular times. In 1611, a new church was built in the village of Markkina. After the destruction of this church, another one was erected in the same place in 1661.

Since the end of the 17th century, the reindeer-Sami culture, which was based on keeping large herds of reindeer, spread from Norwegian and Swedish Lapland to Enontekiö. The reindeer-Sami of Enontekiö had a nomadic way of life; they moved with their animals between the coniferous forests in the south to Kåfjord, Kvænangen, and Nordreisa (in Norway) on the coast of the Arctic Ocean following the annual cycle of summer and winter grazing land. Enontekiö's last nomads did not settle down until the 1960s, but the culture of the reindeer-Sami is still preserved in the large-scale herding of reindeer. As of the 17th century, the first Finnish people settled down in the south of Enontekiö and introduced the culture of settled agriculture. Due to the Finnish immigration and the assimilation of the old-established Sami population, a Finnish majority emerged over the years.

=== Grand Duchy of Finland period ===
In 1809 when Sweden ceded the region of today's Finland to Russia in the Treaty of Fredrikshamn, Enontekiö became a part of the newly founded Grand Duchy of Finland, too. Because the church of Markkina stood on the Swedish—and therefore wrong—side of the river after the Swedish-Russian demarcation, it was torn down in 1826. Its beams were shipped down the Muoniojoki to Palojoensuu, where the church was rebuilt as henceforth the fourth church of Enontekiö. Already in 1864, the church was again moved to Hetta, which had in the meantime became the largest settlement of the region. The closure of the Finnish-Norwegian border in 1852 and the Finnish-Swedish border in 1889 by Russian authorities had severe consequences for Enontekiö's reindeer-nomads, because they could no longer move with their herds to the coast of the Arctic Ocean. As a result, they transferred their grazing areas inland to the southeast and helped spread the culture of reindeer-herding to the remaining parts of Lapland. Due to the separation of the administration of the municipality from the church administration, the political municipality of Enontekiö came into existence in 1877.

=== After independence ===
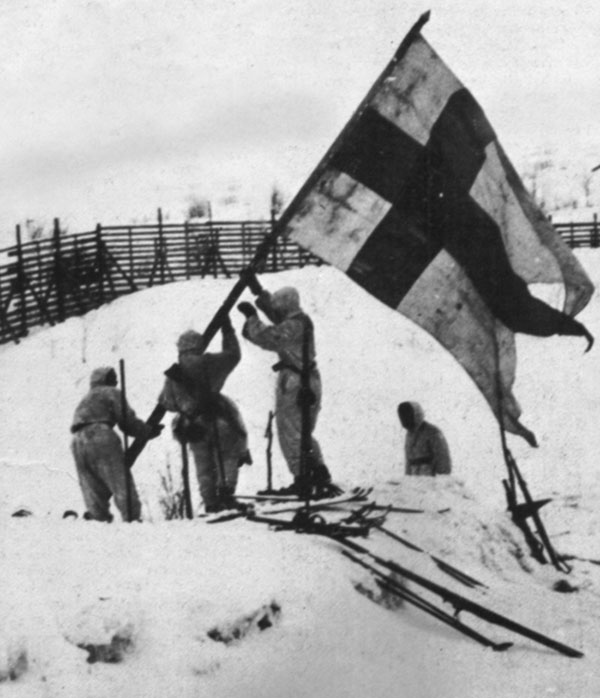
Finnish soldiers hoist a flag at the Norwegian border after the last German soldiers were expelled.

With the Finnish declaration of independence in 1917, Enontekiö became a part of the independent republic of Finland, too.

During the Continuation War (1941–1944), where Finland allied with Germany in fighting against the Soviet Union, Enontekiö, together with all of northern Finland, was part of the operational region of the Wehrmacht. In 1942, the Germans in Enontekiö started to establish the Sturmbock emplacement in occupied Norway and in Petsamo in order to protect the harbours on the Arctic Ocean. When Finland concluded the Moscow Armistice with the Soviet Union on 4 September 1944, committing themselves to expel the German troops, the Finnish-German Lapland War broke out. Lapland's civilian population had to be moved to a safe place in a very short time. Enontekiö's population was evacuated to neutral Sweden together with all of western Lapland's inhabitants. After the Germans quickly left southern Lapland, the 12,000 soldiers of the 7th Gebirgsdivision (Mountain Division) of the Wehrmacht occupied the Sturmbock emplacement at the end of October. During their fallback, the German applied the tactics of scorched earth and devastated Enontekiö, too. During the cold winter, a war of attrition was maintained between German troops, barricaded in their fortifications, and Finnish troops, who took a stand in Markkina. After the Wehrmacht had abandoned Petsamo and northern Norway, the Sturmbock emplacement was no longer of strategic value and was cleared without a struggle at the beginning of January in 1945. In order to secure the flank in Lyngen Municipality, their last emplacement in northern Norway, the Germans still operated in the north of the Käsivarsi region, where minor combat operations took place, before the last Wehrmacht soldiers left Finnish soil on 27 April at Kilpisjärvi.

== Population ==
=== Population development and structure ===
Enontekiö currently has nearly 2,000 inhabitants. In the beginning 1990s, there were still 2,500 inhabitants. Because the structurally weak Lapland was hit harder by the Finnish economic crisis than the south, a wave of migration to expansion centers in the south started in the middle of the decade. Initially, the number of inhabitants also rapidly decreased in Enontekiö, but it now has consolidated at a lower level. Enontekiö's population consists of 12.5% under the age of 15, 58.3% between 15 and 64, and 29.2% older than 64. The excess of men is conspicuous. They account for 53.2% of the population.

Population development
| Year | 1980 | 1985 | 1990 | 1995 | 1996 | 1997 | 1998 | 1999 | 2000 | 2001 | 2002 | 2003 | 2004 | 2005 | 2006 |
| Inhabitants | 2,286 | 2,415 | 2,472 | 2,413 | 2,378 | 2,365 | 2,324 | 2,225 | 2,145 | 2,100 | 2,073 | 2,022 | 1,998 | 2,000 | 1,997 |

=== Sami ===
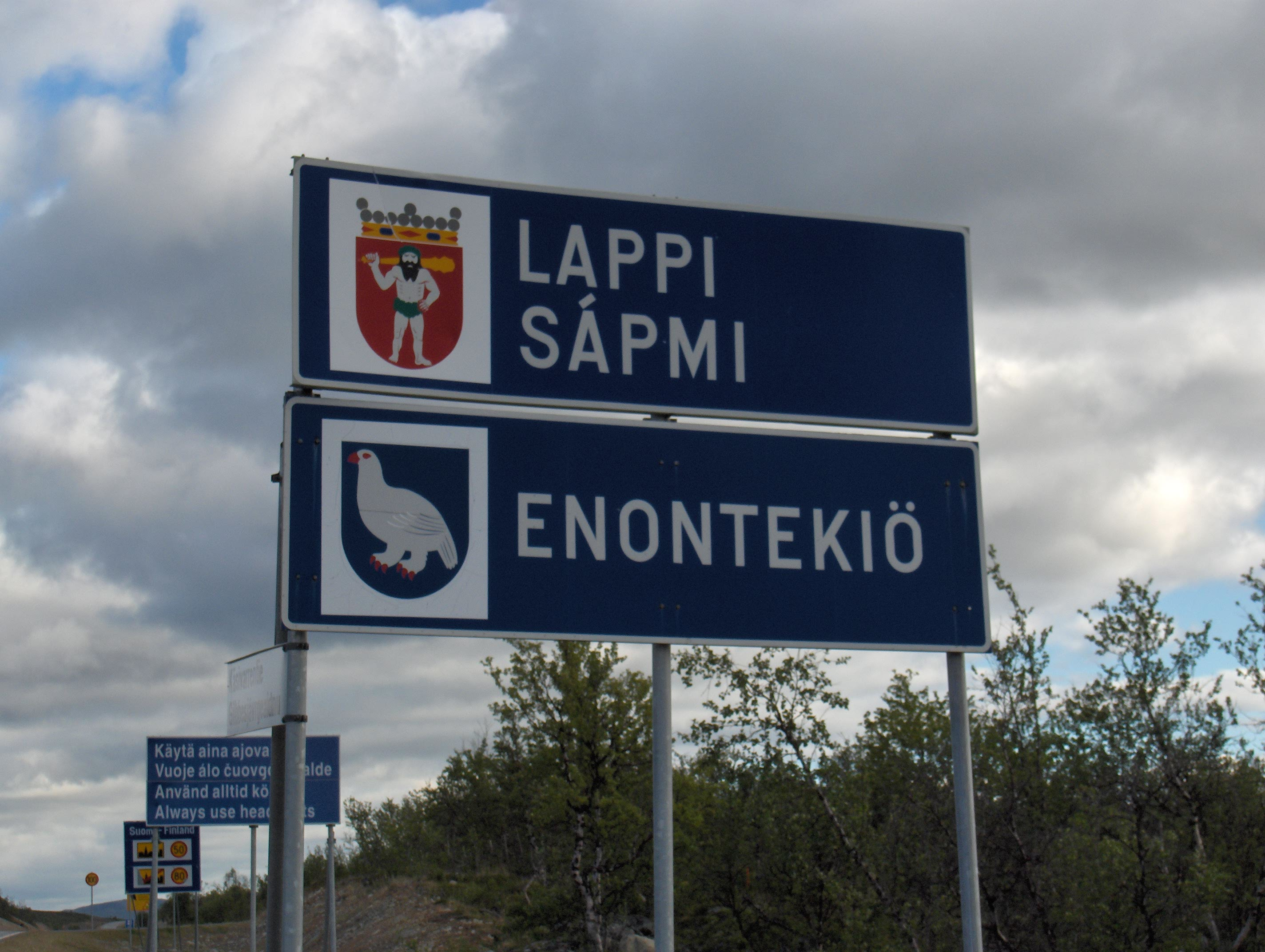
Boundary sign at Kilpisjärvi, entering Finland on the E8 road at the border with Norway. The top, bilingual sign in Finnish and Northern Sami is in the Lapland Region.

Enontekiö is part of the native settlement area of the indigenous Sami people. Nineteen percent of the municipality's population are ethnic Sami, but only 10.2% speak Sami as their native language. The municipality is part of the Sami "homeland" (kotiseutualue), which is defined by law and where Sami have special minority rights. Thus Northern Sami, the particular Sami language used in Enontekiö, has official status in the municipality besides the Finnish language, and therefore is allowed to be used in contact with the authorities. Well-known Sami from Enontekiö are the artist, Nils-Aslak Valkeapää and the Joik-singer Wimme.

=== Religion ===
Enontekiö's Evangelical Lutherans are part of the parish of Enontekiö, which is subordinate to the diocese of Oulu. It has been an independent parish since 1916, it had previously been a chapel parish of Muonio. As in the rest of Lapland, the Laestadianism, a conservative Lutheran movement of the Great Awakening, is strongly represented in Enontekiö. The Laestadian are organised within the Evangelical Lutheran Church. From 1826 to 1849, Lars Levi Laestadius, the founder of the Laestadianism, was pastor in Karesuando in Sweden, from where his doctrine quickly spread to the adjacent Enontekiö. The first awakening in Finland took place in the winter of 1846/47 in Enontekiö and Muonio.

== Politics ==
=== Parliamentary elections ===
Results of the 2019 Finnish parliamentary election in Enontekiö:

- Centre Party 38.2%
- True Finns 15.2%
- National Coalition Party 14.7%
- Social Democratic Party 12.7%
- Swedish People's Party 0,3%
- Left Alliance 4.8%
- Green League 9.0%
- Christian Democrats 3.4%

=== Administration ===
After some contested decisions have been made during the 2017-2021 election period, some members of the formerly dominating Centre Party established the independent list Enontekiöläisten ääni ("Voice of the people of Enontekiö"). In the 2021 elections of the municipal council, which is the highest instance for local affairs, the new list Enontekiöläisten ääni gained the most votes and now provides five out of seventeen representatives to the municipal council. Both of the large parties in rural Finland, the National Coalition Party and the Centre Party have three seats in the municipal council each. The Green league and the local Sami list of Johtti Sápmelaččat have two representatives each. Like Enontekiöläisten ääni, also the Finns Party is new to the municipal council. The Finns Party as well as the Christian Democrats provide one representative to the municipal council each. Since 2017 the National Coalition Party and the Christian Democrats have been in a local alliance. The number of seats in the local municipal council is seventeen.

Composition of the municipal council (2021–2025)
| Party | Election results 2021 | Seats |
|---|---|---|
| Enontekiöläisten ääni | 29.6% | 5 |
| National Coalition Party | 19.8% | 3 |
| Centre Party | 17.2% | 3 |
| Greens | 9.9% | 2 |
| Johtti Sápmelaččat | 9.9% | 2 |
| Finns Party | 8.9% | 1 |
| Christian Democrats | 2.8% | 1 |

=== Coat of arms ===
Enontekiö's coat of arms

Enontekiö's coat of arms was designed by Olof Eriksson. It depicts a silver, red-armoured Willow grouse in a blue field. The willow grouse is a very prevalent bird in Northern Lapland and was an important food for Enontekiö's inhabitants in the past, which is why it is also called the "bird of life".

=== Twin municipalities ===
Enontekiö is a twin municipality with three of its neighbouring municipalities, Kiruna Municipality in Sweden, Storfjord Municipality in Norway, and Kautokeino Municipality in Norway.

== Economy and infrastructure ==
=== Economy ===
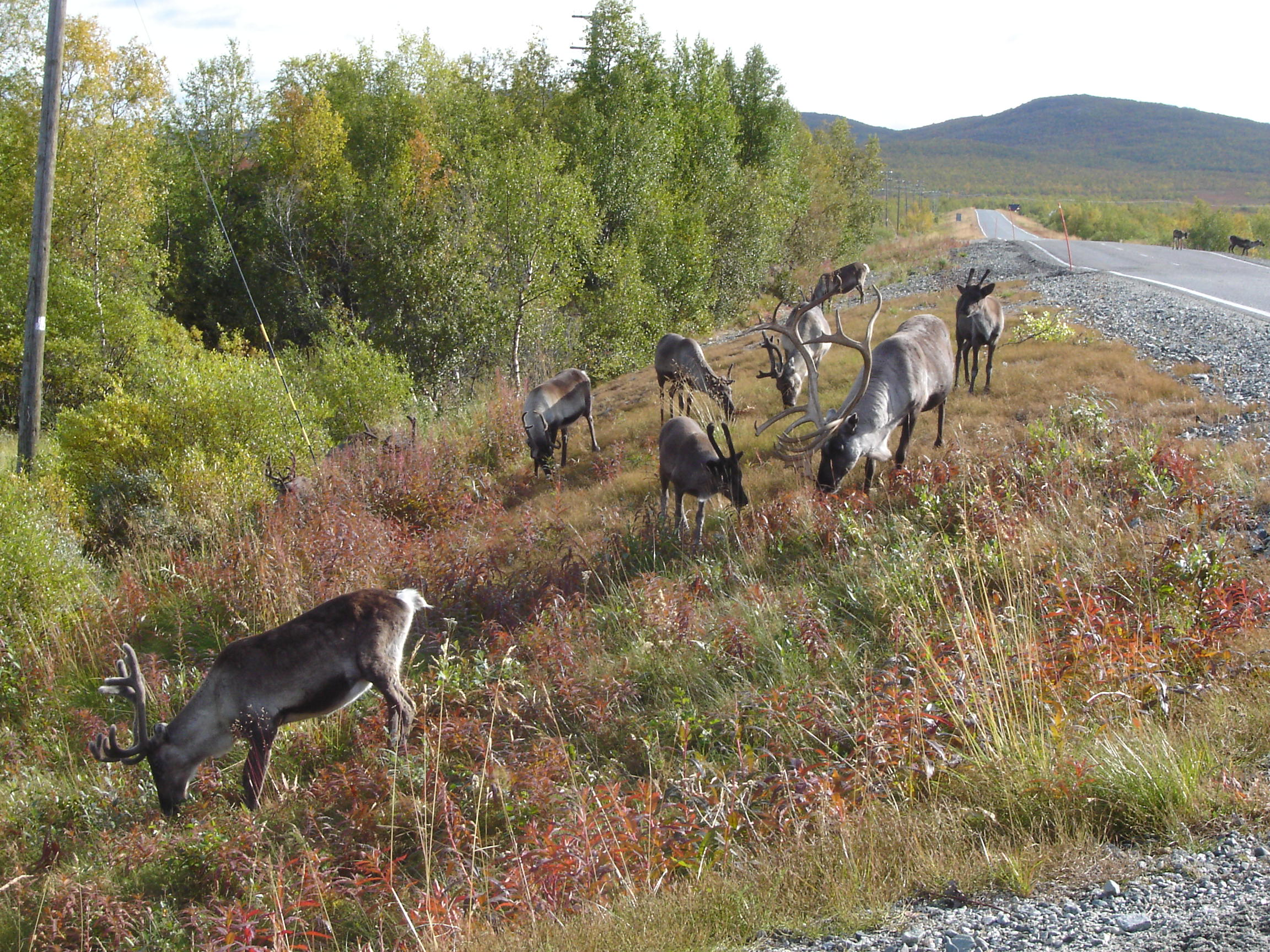
Reindeer run free in Enontekiö.

Enontekiö's economic structure has a large percentage involved in the service sector: 76% of the gainfully employed population work in the tertiary sector, 45% of these work in civil service. Agriculture and forestry employ 13% of Enontekiö's inhabitants, the manufacturing sector 6%. As is usual in the structurally weak Lapland, the unemployment in Enontekiö is a big problem: In January 2007 with 24.7%, the municipality had the second highest unemployment rate of all Finnish municipalities. In 1996 at the peak of the Finnish economic crisis, the unemployment rate was near 40%.

Reindeer husbandry was the dominant branch of business in Enontekiö for a long time. In the northwest of Lapland, reindeer husbandry has already been done for centuries, in contrast to the other regions of the Finnish reindeer husbandry area, where it was only introduced on a large scale in the 19th century after the eradication of the wild Finnish forest reindeer (Rangifer tarandus fennicus). Reindeer husbandry plays an important role even today. The herders are organised in the cooperatives (paliskunta) of Näkkälä and Käsivarsi and have a total of 20,000 semi-domesticated reindeer. Due to the climatic conditions, agriculture is scarcely possible, but dairy farming is operated on a small scale. Due to the sparse vegetation, forestry plays only a minor role.

Tourism is a major branch of business in Enontekiö, even if there are fewer visitors than in those municipalities of Lapland which have big skiing centres. Enontekiö mostly attracts nature tourists, who travel to Lapland for hiking, fishing, canoeing, skiing or snowmobiling, as well as automobile tourists, such as those on their way to the North Cape. Annually, more than 100,000 overnight stays are registered. Twenty percent of the tourists are from abroad. The largest group are the Norwegians, followed by the Germans, Swedes, Dutch, and British. The Norwegians visit Enontekiö mainly for its low prices. The Norwegian shopping tourism made up 40% of the retail business volume in all of Enontekiö, and even 60–70% in Kilpisjärvi, near the border.

=== Transportation ===
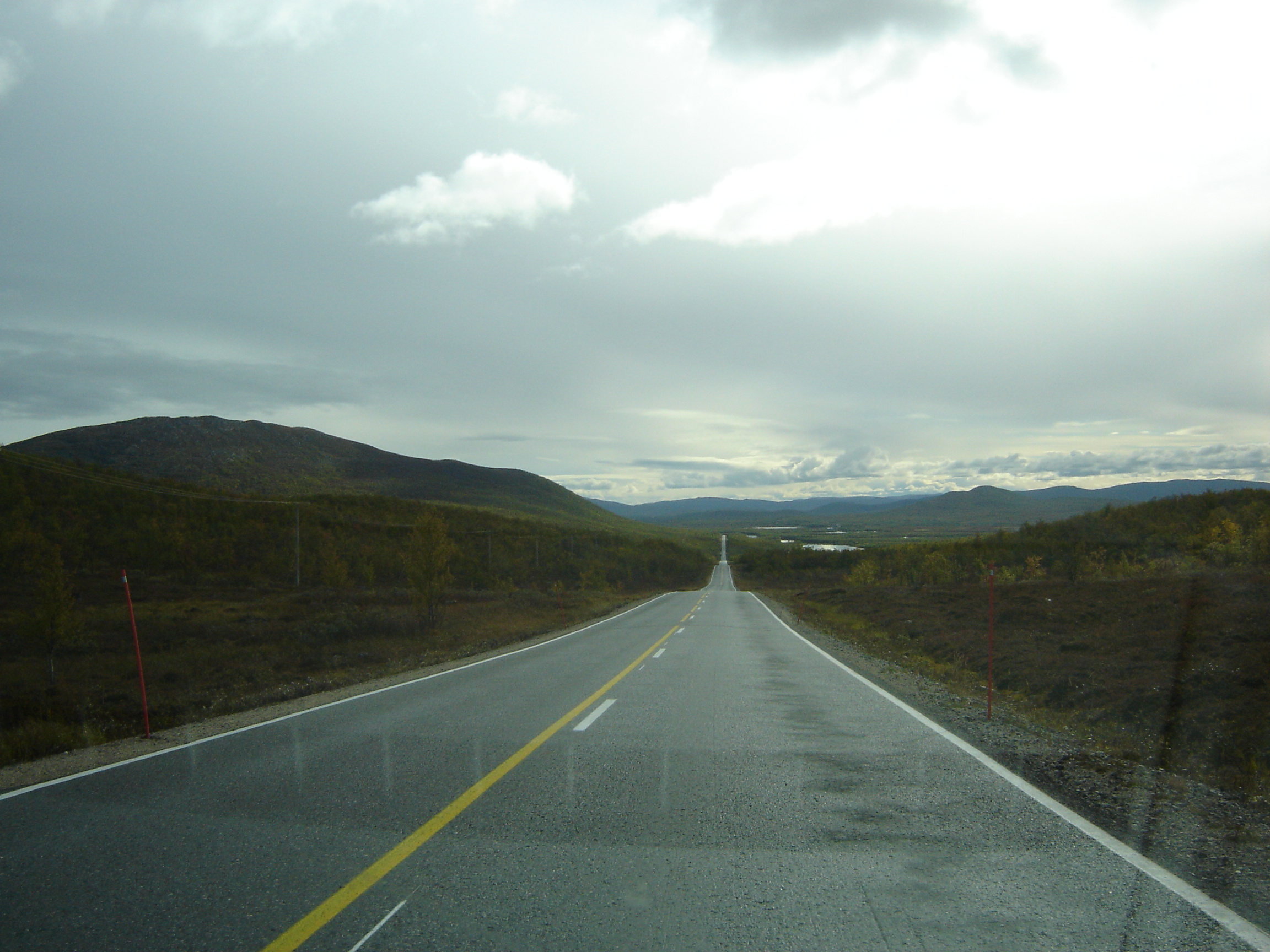
Highway 21 in the north of Enontekiö

Enontekiö's most important traffic connection is highway 21 (E8). Along its entire route, starting in Tornio at the Gulf of Bothnia, it follows the line of the Finnish–Swedish border and ends in Kilpisjärvi at the Norwegian border. The main road 93 branches off highway 21 at Palojoensuu and at first leads in an eastward direction to the municipal centre of Hetta and then further in a northward direction to the Norwegian border. The villages of the southern part of the municipality are connected to each other by small roads. But in the northern part of Enontekiö, highway 21 is the only road, taking a course next to the banks of the Muonionjoki and Könkämäeno; the uninhabited area between the river valley and the Norwegian border has no roads at all. There are three border crossings in Enontekiö: The village of Karesuvanto is connected by a bridge with the Swedish bank and there are border crossings to Norway in Kilpisjärvi and Kivilompolo.

The municipality has its own airport, (Enontekiö Airport), west of Hetta. It is mainly approached by charter flights, whose passengers account for 95% of the airport's passenger volume. Regular flights to Enontekiö are established only in the spring. The company Finncomm Airlines provides direct flights to Enontekiö from Helsinki-Vantaa between March and May. The passenger volume of 13,700 passengers per year is relatively low.

Enontekiö is not connected to the railroad network. The next railroad station is in Kolari, approximately 150 kilometres (93 mi) to the south.

=== Education and social affairs ===
There are five primary schools in Enontekiö: In the Kilpisjärvi primary school, pupils are taught from preschool to 9th grade, in the schools of Karesuvanto, Hetta, and Peltojärvi, from preschool to 6th grade. Enontekiö's upper school is attended by pupils of the 7th to 9th grade. The higher education entrance qualification can be obtained after graduating from the upper school at the secondary school of Enontekiö. The primary schools of Kilpisjärvi and Karesuvanto and the upper school of Enontekiö offer native language education to Sami pupils. Adult education takes place at an adult education centre. The municipality's library is located in the main village of Hetta, more remote regions are supplied by a mobile library. The University of Helsinki runs a biological research station in Kilpisjärvi. The University of Oulu runs the KAIRA radio telescope facility at Kilpisjärvi as well.

Healthcare is organised together with the neighbouring municipality of Muonio. In Enontekiö, there are two health centres for inpatient treatment, one in Hetta and one in Karesuvanto. Beds are available in Muonio's health centre.

== Culture and sightseeing ==
=== Buildings ===
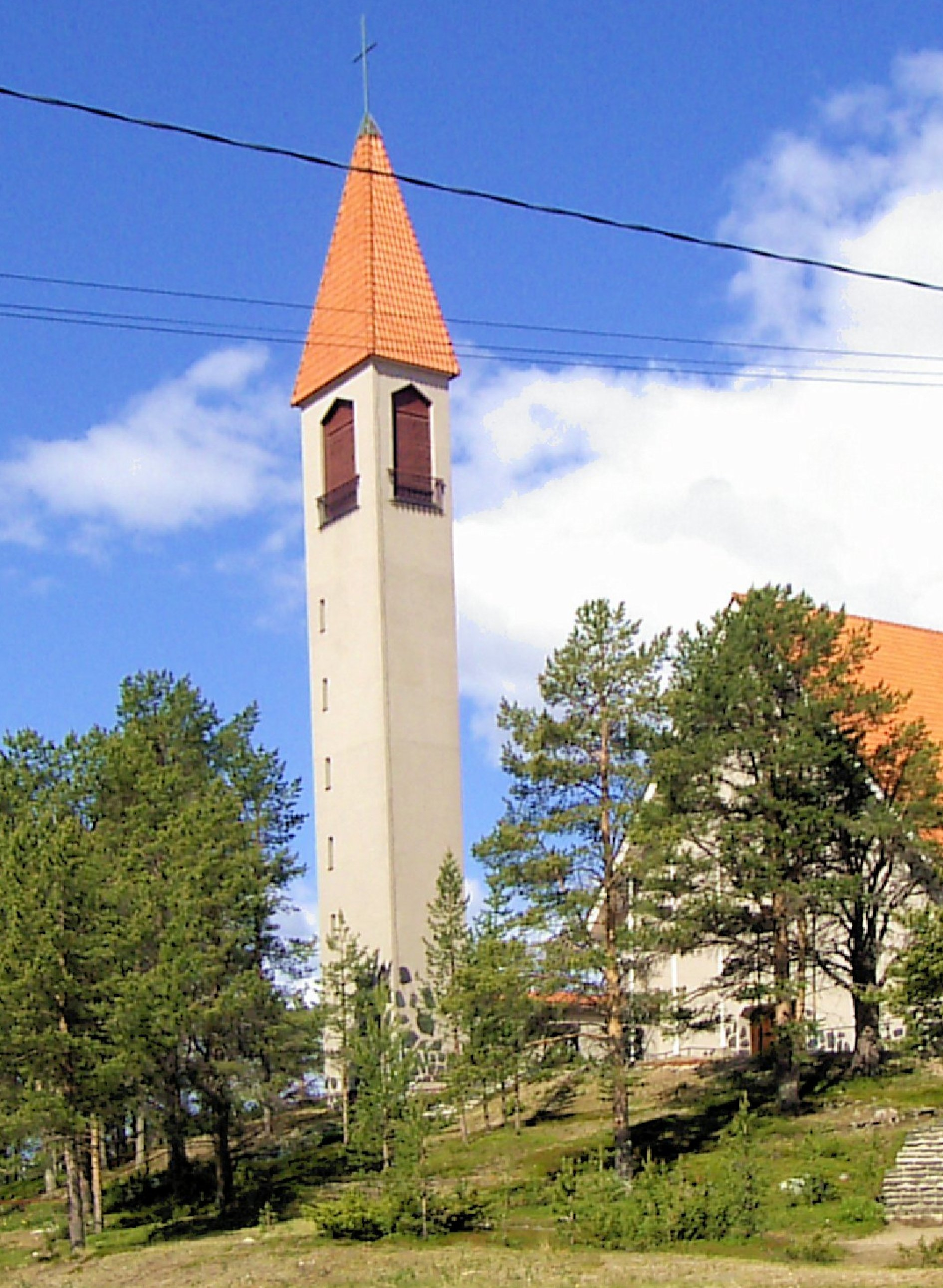
The church of Enontekiö

The church of Enontekiö was built in the central village of Hetta in 1951/52 as a replacement for its predecessor, which was destroyed during the Lapland war; it is the sixth church of the municipality. It is a modern building made from brick and concrete and designed by the architect, Veikko Larkas. The slender church tower is 30 m high and is connected to the nave by a porch. The artist Uuno Eskola made the altarpiece of the church with a combination of fresco and mosaic techniques. It depicts the resurrected Jesus Christ, who is blessing Lapland and its people. The church's organ was a gift from Germany from 1958.

Due to their preserved old building structure, the villages of Kultima, Näkkälä, Nunnanen, Peltovuoma, Pöyrisjärvi, and Raittijärvi are officially listed cultural monuments. The stone bridge of Ahdaskuru, erected in 1943 near the Norwegian border, is also listed; it is the only bridge in Lapland which was not destroyed during the Lapland War.

=== Museums ===
There are three museums in Enontekiö: The buildings of the museum of local history, which opened in 1991, were moved to Hetta from different villages in the municipality. They are a farmhouse from Raattama from the end of the 19th century, a living room from Ylikyrö from the 1920s, a storehouse also from Ylikyrö from the 18th century, a sauna from Muotkajärvi built in 1937, and a cattle shed from Kaukonen in the neighbouring municipality of Kittilä. The nature and culture centre of Fjell-Lapland is maintained by the Finnish Forest Office (Metsähallitus) and is located in Hetta, too. With its exhibitions, it shows the nature of northern Lapland and the culture of the reindeer-Sami. In Järämä, approximately 20 km north of Karesuvanto, a part of the Sturmbock emplacement from the Lapland War was restored. Since 1997, there is an annexed museum, dealing with the history of the Lapland War in Enontekiö.

=== Regular events ===
Since 1971, a Sami cultural event, the Mary's Days of Hetta (Hetan Marianpäivät), is held at the beginning of March. It continues the old Sami tradition of meeting in the church village on special holidays. Today, Mary's Days include performances of Sami music, art exhibitions, contests of riding a reindeer sleigh and roping. At Easter, a church and chamber music festival, the Music Days of Hetta (Hetan musiikkipäivät), is held in Enontekiö. From the end of April to the beginning of May, a contest of ice fishing (Kilpisjärven pilkkiviikot) attracts fishermen. In late summer, a tournament of orienteering (Suomen tunturisuunnistus) is held on the fells near Kilpisjärvi.

== Notable individuals ==
- Andte Gaupe-Juuso, Big Brother 2014 winner
- Kai Hyttinen, musician and a former Kilpisjärvi wilderness guide
- Anni-Kristiina Juuso, actress
- Aslak Juuso, a herder
- Pigga Keskitalo, Sámi politician and academic
- Yrjö Kokko, writer
- Ilmari Mattila, actress
- Juhani Raattamaa, "lay preacher"
- Wimme Saari, singer
- Nils-Aslak Valkeapää, writer, artist and musician
- Niko Valkeapää, musician
- Vuontis-Kalle, storyteller
