= Ounasjoki =

River tributary in the country of Finland

Coordinates: 66°50′N 025°25′E

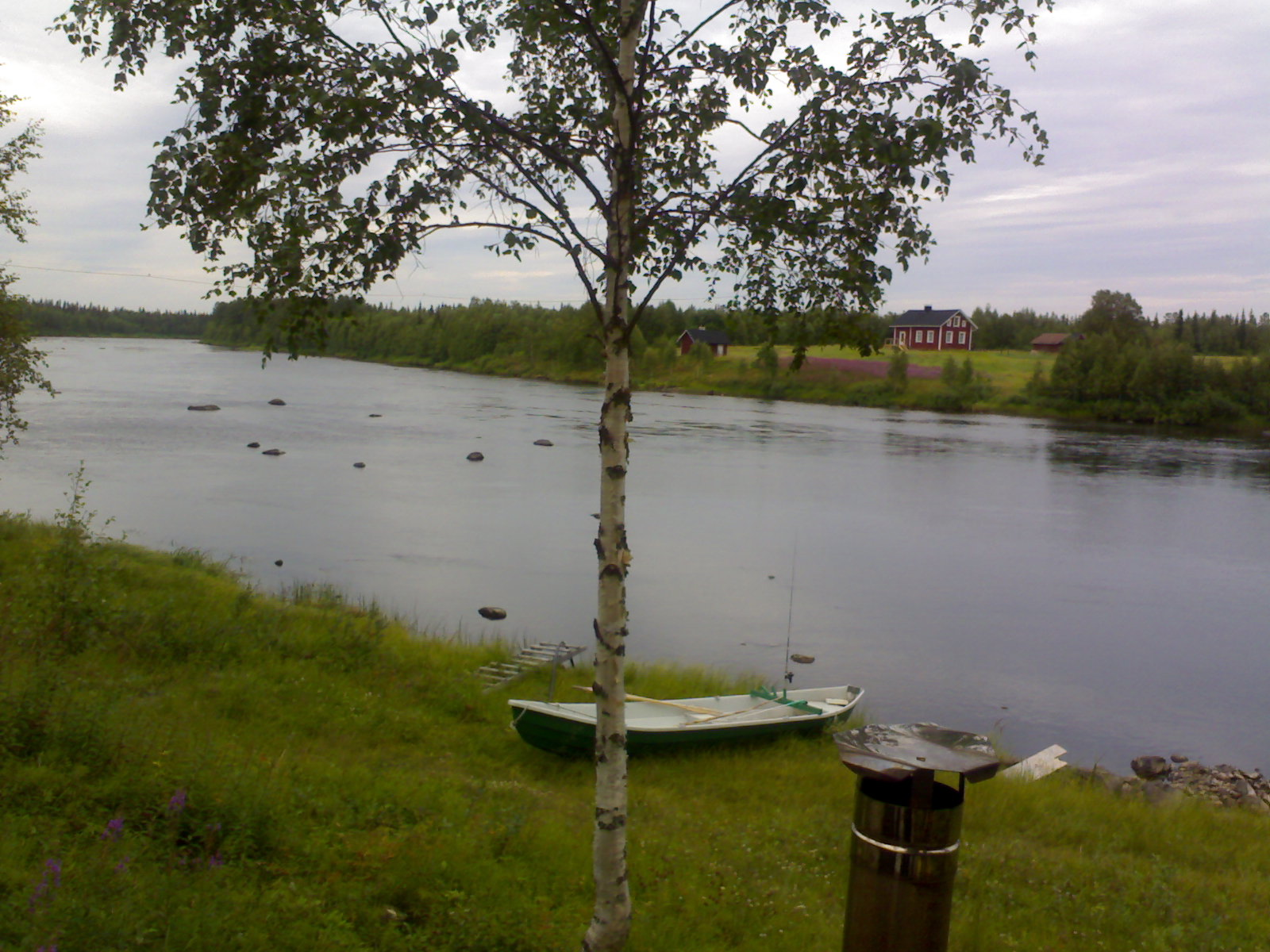
- Ounajoki above the rapids
- Native name: Ovnnesjohka (Northern Sami)

Location
- Country: Finland

Physical characteristics
- Source
  - location: Ounasjärvi, Enontekiö, Finland
  - elevation: 450 metres (1,480 ft)
- Mouth
  - location: Kemijoki, Rovaniemi, Finland
- Length: 299.6 km (186.2 mi)
- Basin size: 13,968 km^{2} (5,393 sq mi)

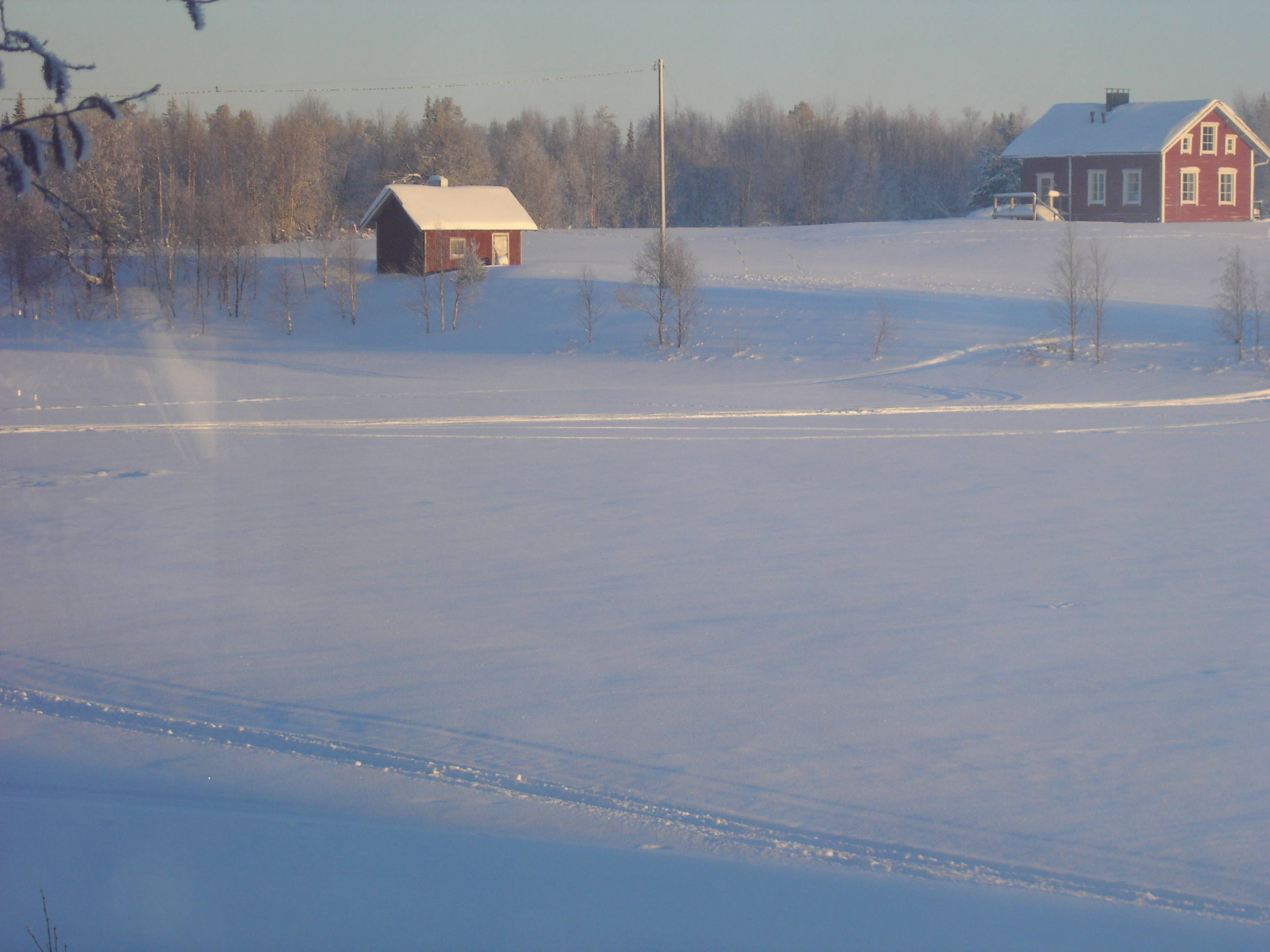
Ounasjoki in wintertime

The Ounasjoki (Northern Sami: Ovnnesjohka) is the Kemijoki's largest tributary and is Finland's longest single river tributary. It is also the largest river entirely within its borders. Ounasjoki is approximately 299.6 kilometres (186.2 mi) in length, and the catchment area is 13,968 square kilometres (5,393 sq mi), 27% of the Kemijoki catchment area.

== Course ==
The Ounasjoki originates at Ounasjärvi lake in Enontekiö. It flows first eastwards through Periläjärvi lake and turns south after some seven kilometres. The river then follows southern-southeasterly course until its confluence with the Kemijoki at Rovaniemi.

== Tributaries ==
=== Left ===
- Näkkäläjoki
- Käkkälöjoki
- Syvä Tepastojoki
- Loukinen
- Meltausjoki

=== Right ===
- Marrasjoki

== Fauna ==
Grayling, trout, pike and other fish typical to northern Finland are found in the Ounasjoki.
