= Hetta =

Hetta (Finnish) Heahttá (Northern Sami)
- Village
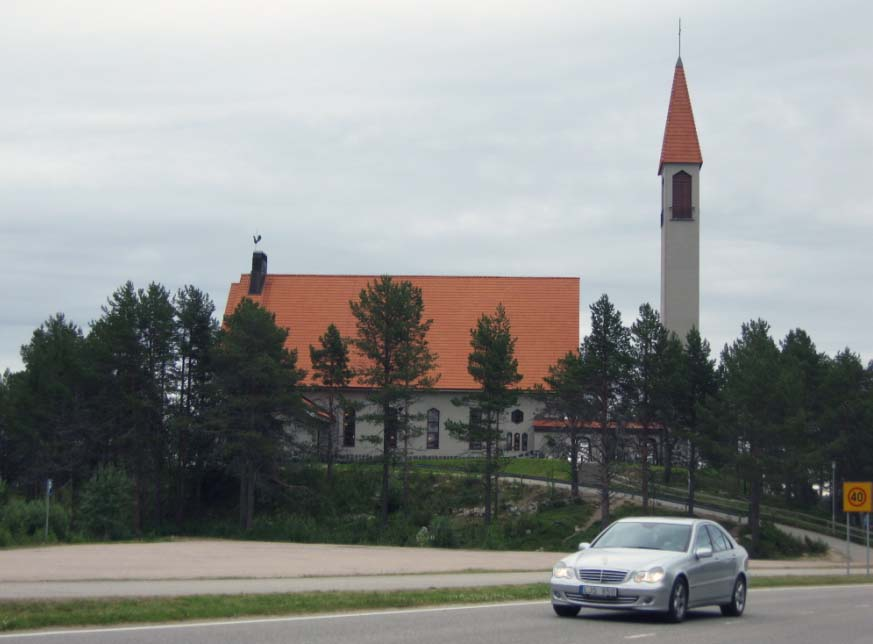
- Enontekiö Church in Hetta

- Location within Lapland Location within Finland
- Coordinates: 68°23′N 023°39′E
- Country: Finland
- Region: Lapland
- Municipality: Enontekiö
- Time zone: UTC+2 (EET)
  - Summer (DST): UTC+3 (EEST)
- Postal code: 99400

Hetta (Finnish: [ˈhetːɑ]; Northern Sami: Heahttá [ˈhea̯hːtaː]) is the main village in the municipality of Enontekiö in the north-west part of Finnish Lapland. It is also the municipality's administrative centre and the start or end point of the standard trekking / skiing route across the Pallas-Yllästunturi National Park.

Enontekiö Airport is located 9 kilometres (6 mi) west of Hetta but nowadays only has regular scheduled flights during the winter, as opposed to all-year round. Otherwise, the nearest Finnish airport is Kittilä, c. 2 hours South although Alta, in Norway is a similar distance. Tromso (Norway), Kiruna (Sweden) and Rovaniemi (Finland) are all a similar distance (c. 3–4 hours drive) although flying into Tromso is a good option if your intention is to spend the majority of your time in the far West of Enontekiö, in the village of Kilpisjärvi.

Hetta is a popular tourist destination for cross country skiers and winter outdoor activity enthusiasts. Ice fishing, husky sledding (the local company, Hetta Huskies, won a Gold Award in the World Responsible Tourism Awards in 2015), snowmobiling and visiting traditional reindeer farms are all popular activities for visitors. There is also plenty of cabin and hotel accommodation and easy access to the high tundra arctic plateaus just 20 km north of the village.
