= List of rivers of the Baltic Sea =

This is a list of rivers that drain into the Baltic Sea (clockwise from Öresund):

== Sweden ==
- Svartån (at Svarte near Ystad)
- Tommarpaån (at Simrishamn)
- Helgeå (at Nyehusen near Kristianstad)
- Hemån (at Karlskrona)
- Ljungbyån (at Ljungby near Kalmar)
- Emån (at Em near Kalmar)
- Göta Canal (at Mem near Söderköping)
- Motala ström (at Norrköping)
- Nyköpingsån (at Nyköping)
- Dalälven (at Gävle)
- Ljusnan (at Söderhamn)
- Indalsälven (at Sundsvall)
- Ångermanälven (at Härnösand)
- Ume älv (at Umeå)
- Skellefte älv (at Skellefteå)
- Pite älv (at Piteå)
- Lule älv (at Luleå)
- Kalix älv (at Kalix)
- Torne älv (at Haparanda/Torneå)

== Finland ==
- Tornionjoki (at Haparanda/Tornio)
- Kemijoki (at Kemi)
- Simojoki (at Simo)
- Iijoki (at Ii)
- Kiiminkijoki (at Haukipudas)
- Oulujoki (at Oulu)
- Siikajoki (at Siikajoki)
- Pyhäjoki (at Pyhäjoki)
- Kalajoki (at Kalajoki)
- Kyrönjoki (near Vaasa)
- Kokemäenjoki (at Pori)
- Aurajoki (at Turku)
- Vantaanjoki (at Helsinki)
- Porvoonjoki (at Porvoo)
- Kymijoki (at Kotka and near Ruotsinpyhtää)

== Russia ==
- Neva (at St Petersburg)
- Pregolya (Pregel) at Kaliningrad (Königsberg)
- Neman at Neman (Kaliningrad Oblast)

== Estonia ==
- Narva (at Narva-Jõesuu)
- Jägala (at Jõesuu)
- Järvoja (at Eisma)
- Pirita (at Tallinn)
- Keila (at Keila-Joa)
- Kasari (at Matsalu)
- Pärnu (at Pärnu)

== Latvia ==
- Gauja, (between Carnikava and Gauja)
- Daugava (at Riga)
- Lielupe (at Jūrmala)
- Venta River (at Ventspils)

== Lithuania ==
- Nemunas at Šilutė
- Minija at Nemunas Delta
- Šventoji at Šventoji resort town
- Danė at Klaipėda
- Smeltalė at Klaipėda

== Poland ==
- Pasłęka at Braniewo
- Nogat between Gdańsk and Elbląg
- Vistula at Gdańsk
- Radunia at Gdańsk
- Reda near Wejherowo
- Łeba at Łebsko Lake
- Słupia at Ustka
- Wieprza at Darłowo
- Parsęta at Kołobrzeg
- Rega near Trzebiatów
- Oder (Polish Odra) at Szczecin
- Swelinia near Sopot

== Germany ==
- Uecker at Ueckermünde
- Peene at Anklam
- Recknitz at Ribnitz-Damgarten
- Warnow at Warnemünde near Rostock
- Trave at Travemünde near Lübeck
- Schwentine at Kiel

== See also ==
- Drainage basins of the Baltic Sea
- Lists of rivers
- Rivers of Europe
