= Jõesuu =

Jõesuu may refer to several places in Estonia:

- Jõesuu, Harju County, village in Jõelähtme Parish, Harju County
- Jõesuu, Hiiu County, village in Hiiumaa Parish, Hiiu County
- Jõesuu, Pärnu County, village in Tori Parish, Pärnu County

== See also ==
- Narva-Jõesuu
- Vääna-Jõesuu
