= Kotisaari =

Island in Finland

Coordinates: 66°29′15″N 25°43′58″E

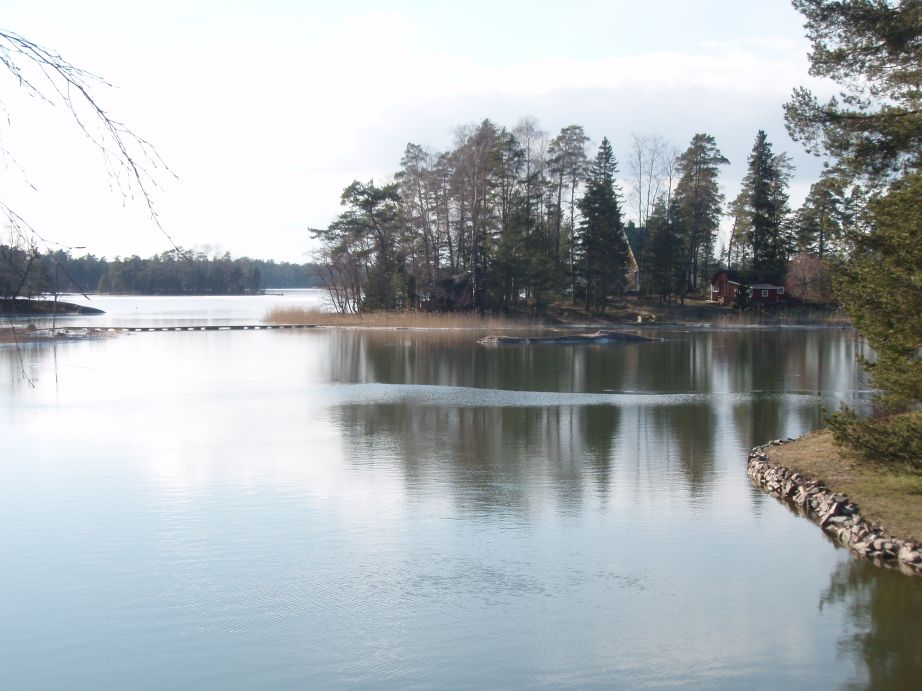
Kotisaari in 2008

Kotisaari is an island on the river Kemijoki, near Rovaniemi, Finland. Starting in the late 1800s, the island was used as a traditional stronghold for lumberjacks. By the 1980s, however, trucks had replaced boats as the primary method of log transportation, and its use as a lumberjack stronghold came to an end.

The Lapland Safaris company operates trips to the island from May to October. They have also converted the old boathouse into a tavern.
