= Narva-Jõesuu Lighthouse =

Lighthouse in Estonia

Narva-Jõesuu Lighthouse Narva-Jõesuu tuletorn
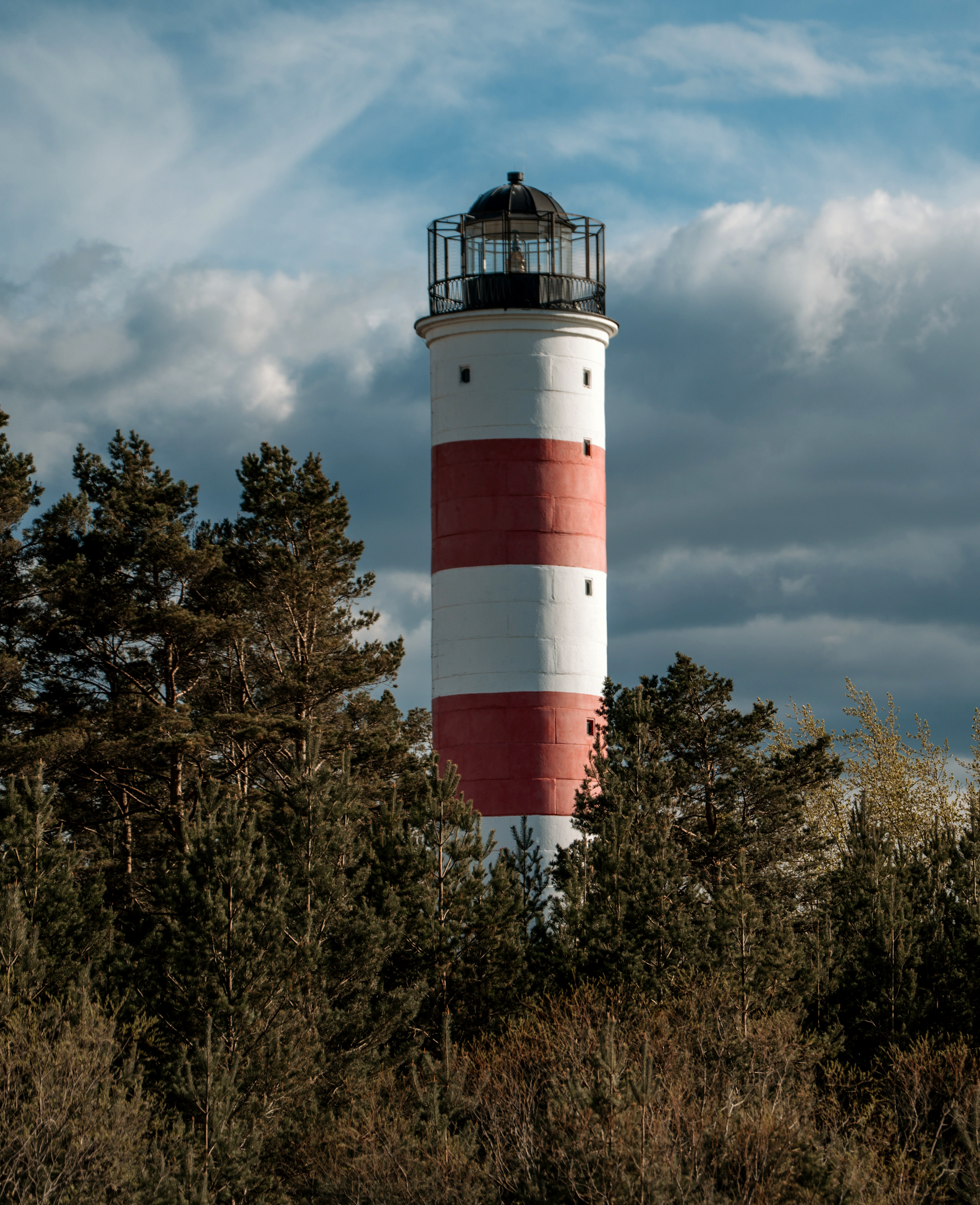
- Location: Narva-Jõesuu, Estonia
- Coordinates: 59°28′06.0″N 28°02′26.1″E

Tower
- Constructed: 1725 (first); 1808 (second); 1957 (current tower)
- Foundation: one-story stone basement
- Construction: concrete
- Height: 30 meters (98 ft)
- Shape: cylindrical tower with balcony and lantern
- Markings: white and red horizontal bands

Light
- First lit: 1957 (current)
- Focal height: 34 meters (112 ft)
- Range: 17 nautical miles (31 km)
- Characteristic: LFl W 12 s.
- Estonia no.: EVA 001

Narva-Jõesuu Lighthouse (Estonian: Narva-Jõesuu tuletorn) is a lighthouse located in Narva-Jõesuu, Estonia, on the Gulf of Finland (Baltic Sea).

== History ==
A lighthouse operated here already during the time of Swedish rule of Estonia, in the 17th century. A stone lighthouse was built in 1808 at the initiative of Leontiy Spafaryev of the Russian Admiralty. It suffered damage during the Crimean War but was repaired in 1870 because of its unstable foundations.

As the town—originally known as Hungerburg—developed into a prominent resort destination in the late 19th and early 20th centuries, the lighthouse became an iconic landmark alongside the region's famous wooden architecture, extensive pine forests, and sandy beach.

In 1941, the historical structure was completely destroyed. A new lighthouse (the presently visible 31-meter cylindrical concrete structure with its characteristic black and white horizontal stripes) was built in 1957 to secure safe navigation at the confluence of the Narva River and the Gulf of Finland. Today, the lighthouse is open to the public, operating as a popular tourist attraction that offers visitors panoramic views of the coast and the surrounding region.

== See also ==
- List of lighthouses in Estonia
