= Eisma =

Village in Estonia

Coordinates: 59°34′N 26°18′E

- Village
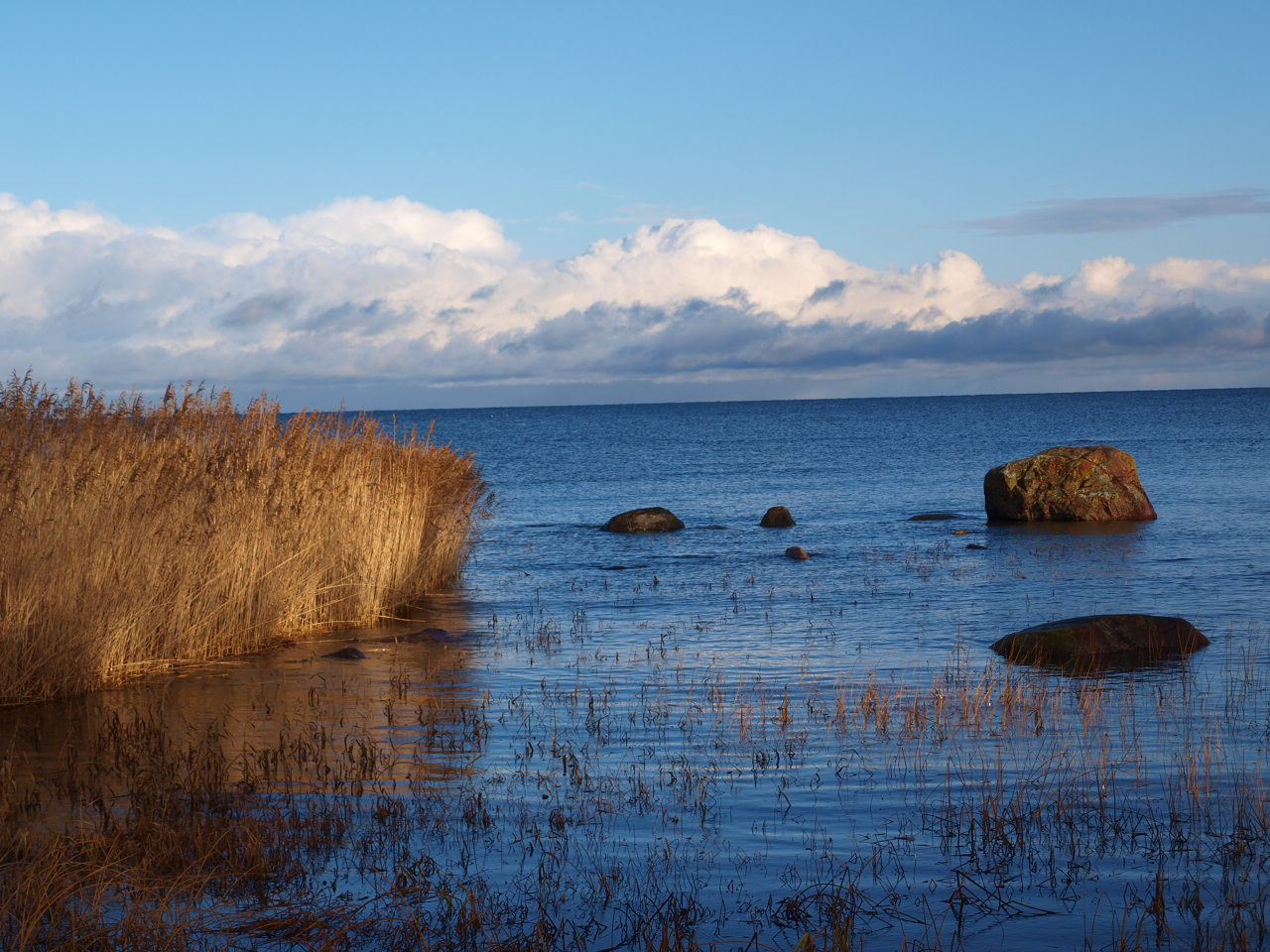
- Seaside at Eisma
- Interactive map of Eisma
- Country: Estonia
- County: Lääne-Viru County
- Parish: Haljala Parish
- Time zone: UTC+2 (EET)
  - Summer (DST): UTC+3 (EEST)

Eisma is a village in Haljala Parish, Lääne-Viru County, in northeastern Estonia.

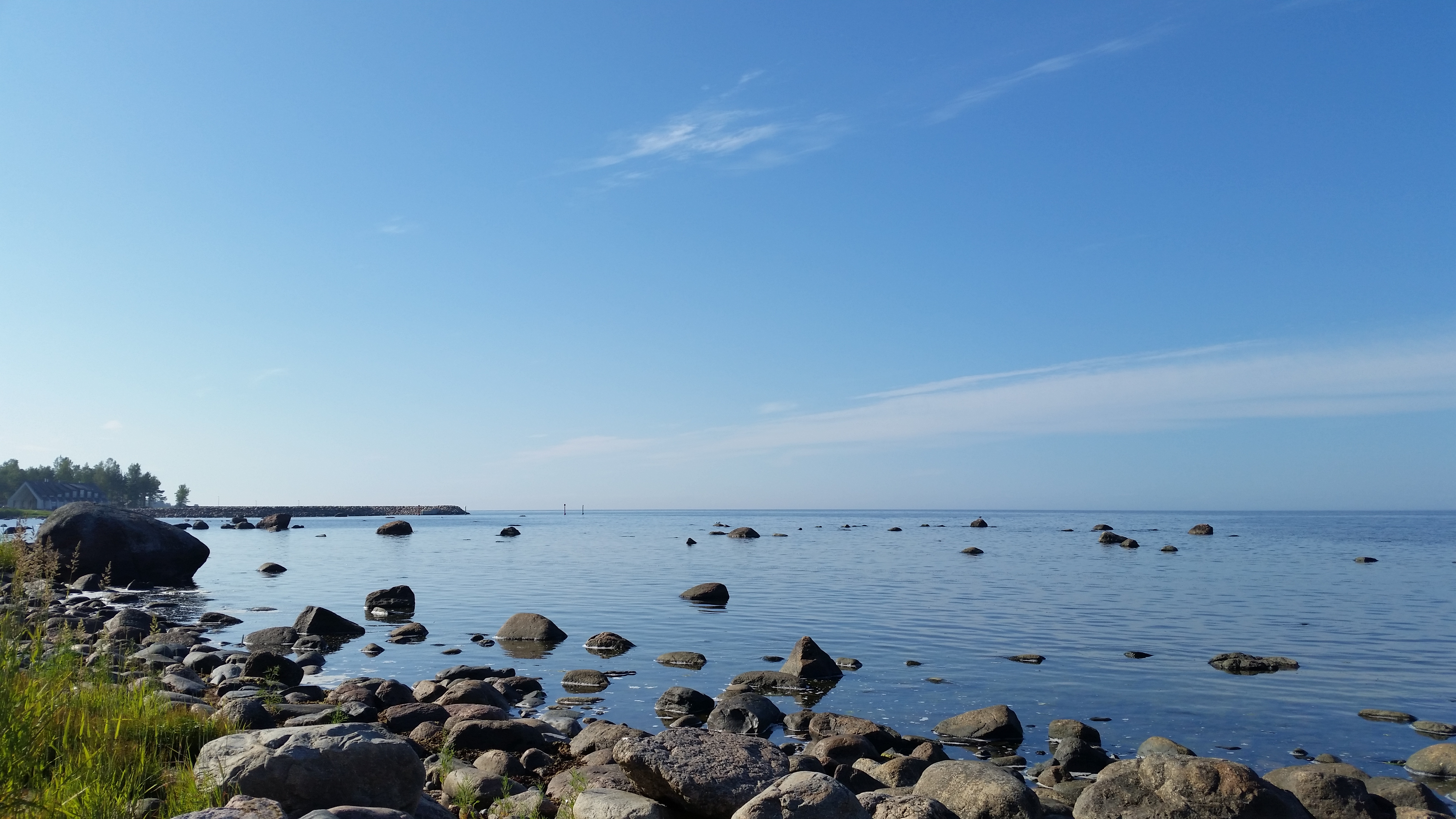

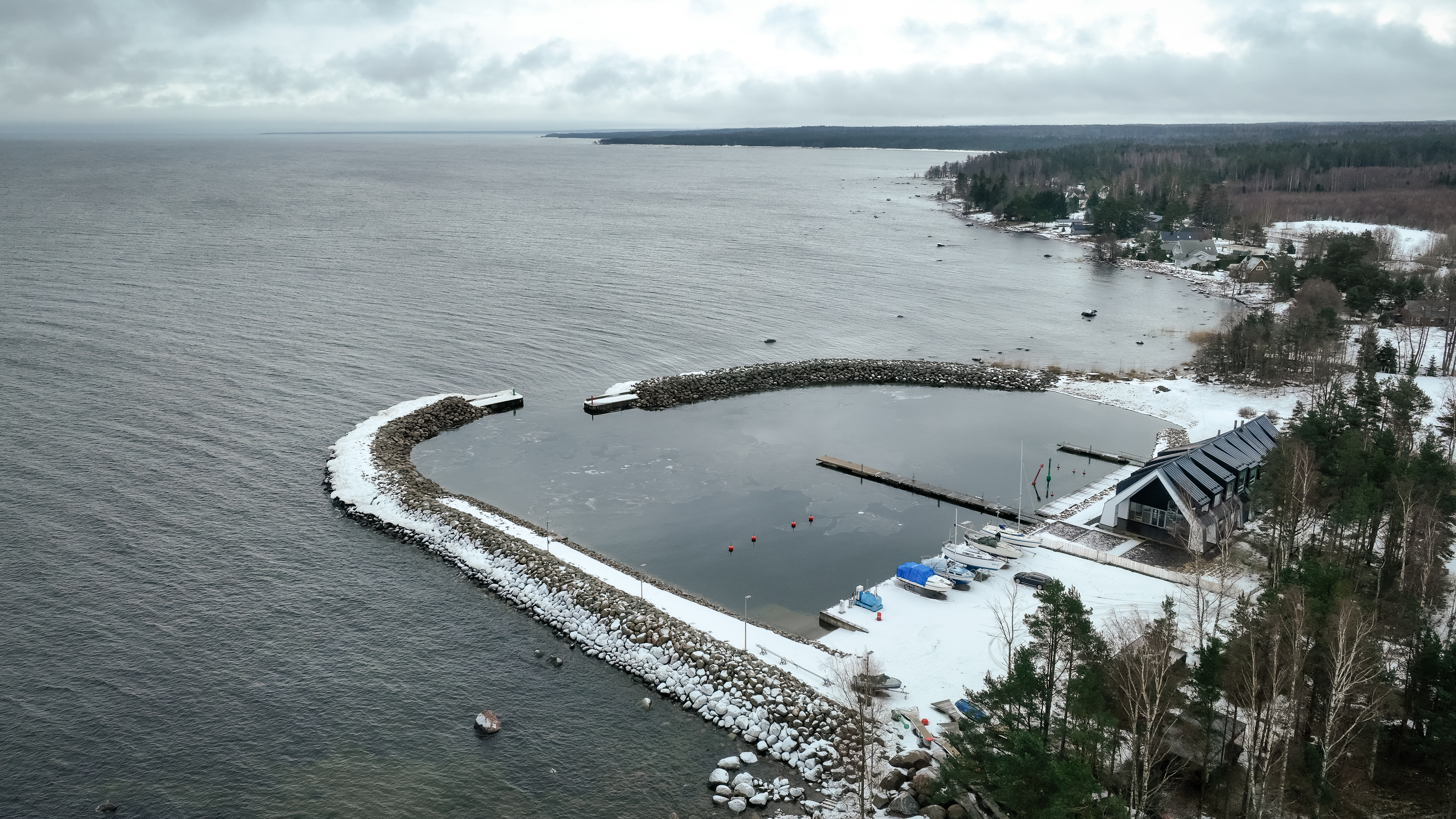

== See also ==
- Järvoja
