= Kemijoki =

River of Lapland region, Finland

Coordinates: 65.77°N 24.45°E

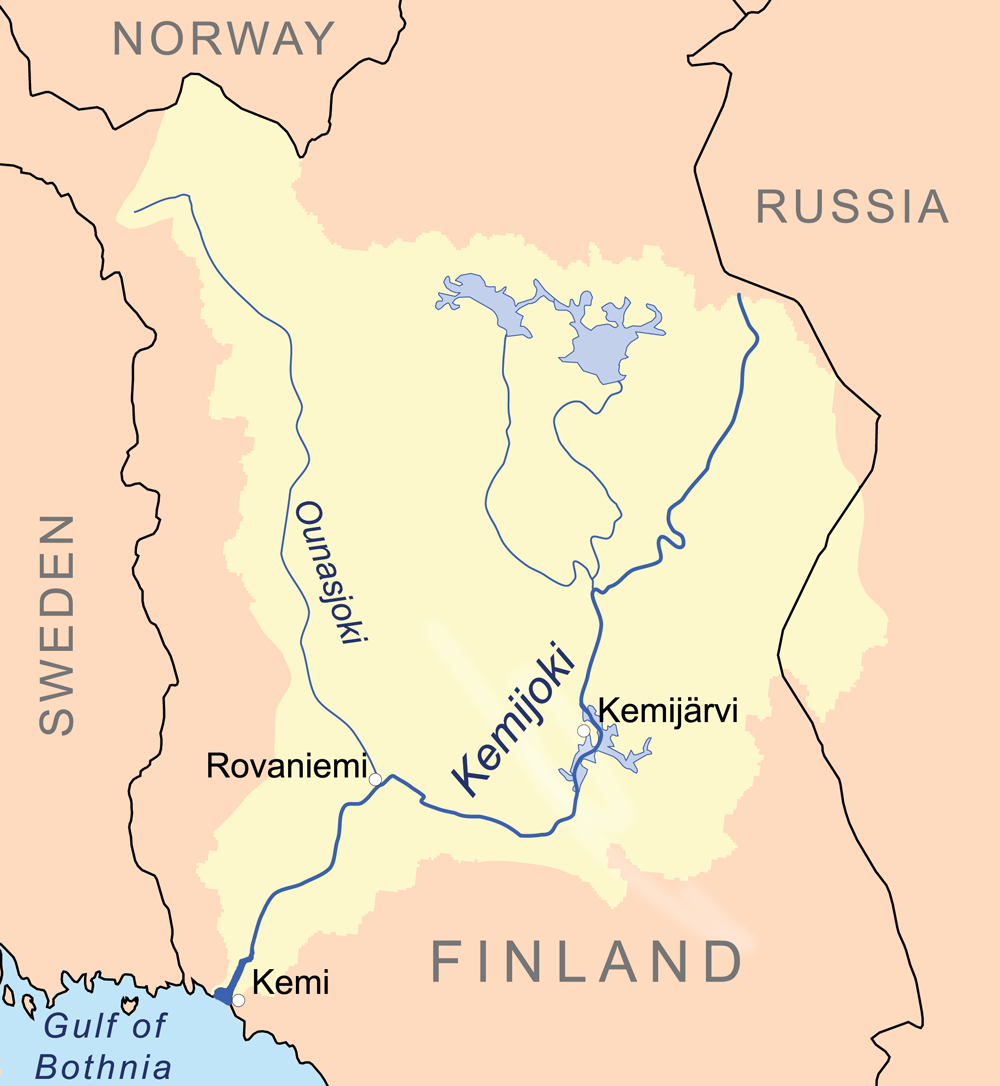
Map of the Kemijoki basin

The Kemijoki in Rovaniemi

The Kemijoki or Kemi River (Swedish: Kemi älv, Northern Sami: Giemajohka), with its 550 km (340 mi) length, is the longest river in Finland. It runs south through the towns of Kemijärvi and Rovaniemi before reaching the Gulf of Bothnia at Kemi. At Rovaniemi the Ounasjoki river merges with the Kemijoki.

The first hydroelectric plant on the Kemijoki, Isohaara hydroelectric power plant, was constructed in 1945–1949 at Isohaara. A total of 15 power plants have been constructed so far. The plants are owned by Kemijoki Oy and Pohjolan Voima Oy. In 2003, the plants produced a total of 4.3 TWh, which was about 34.5% of Finland's total hydroelectric production.

== Power plants ==
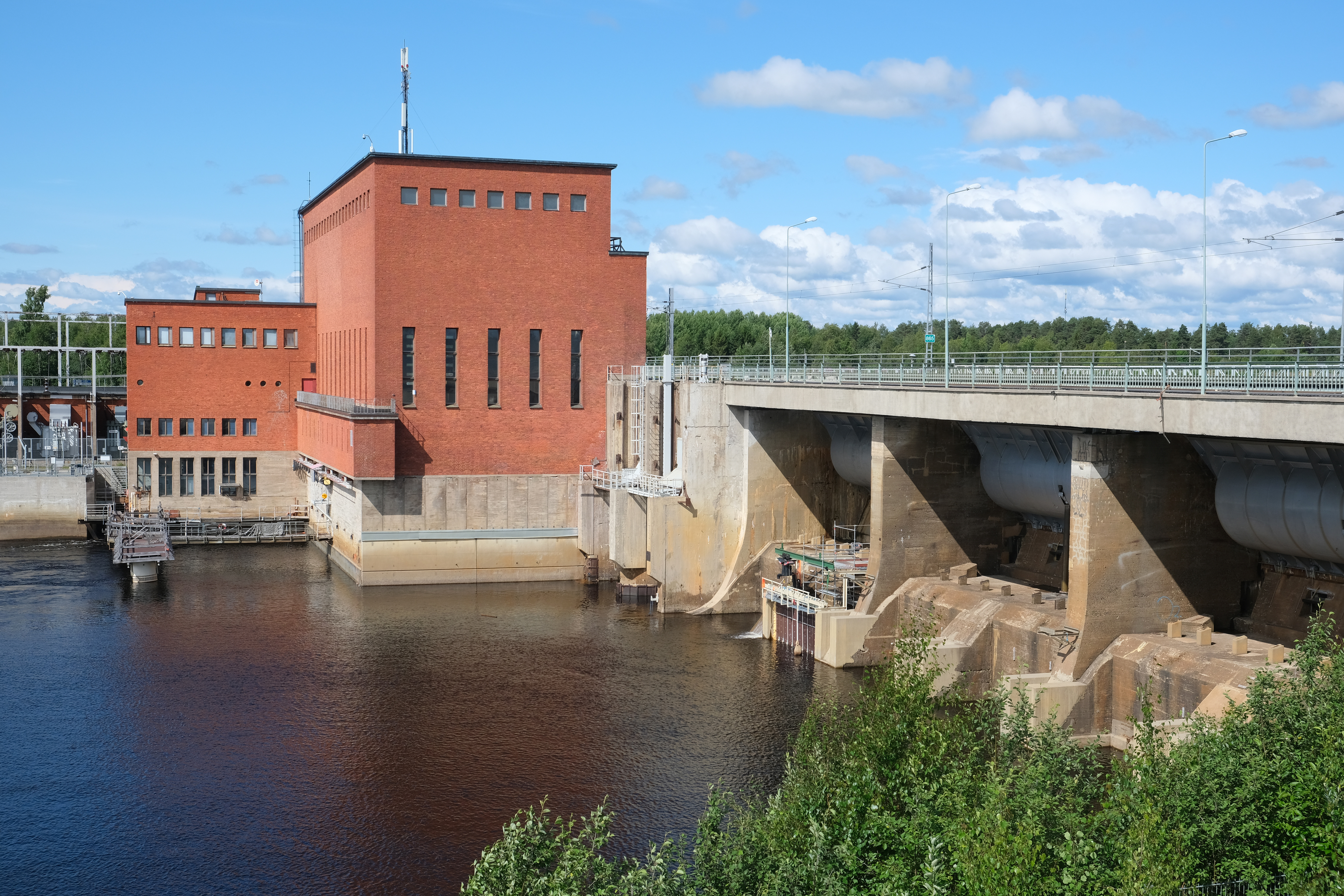
Isohaara

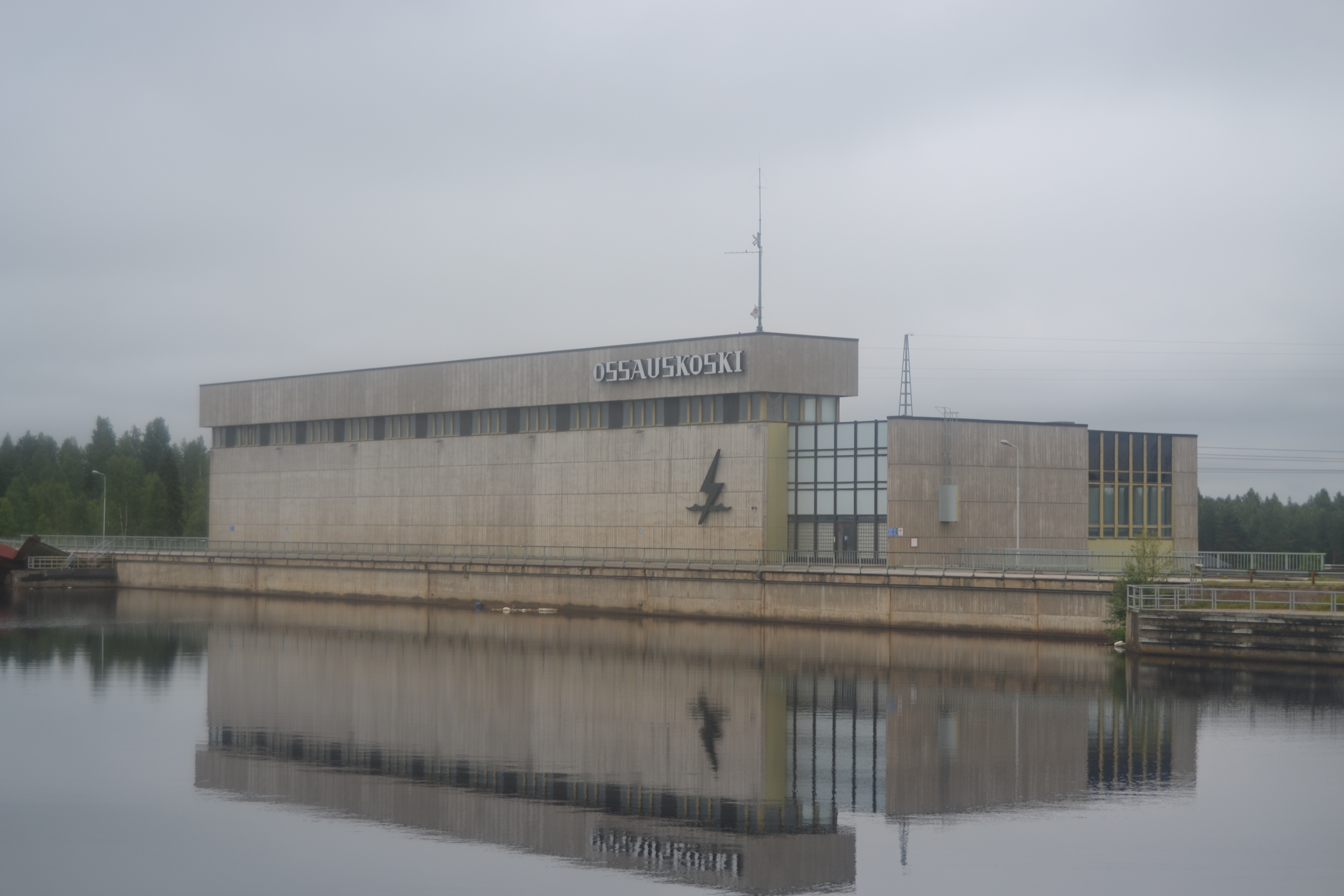
Ossauskoski

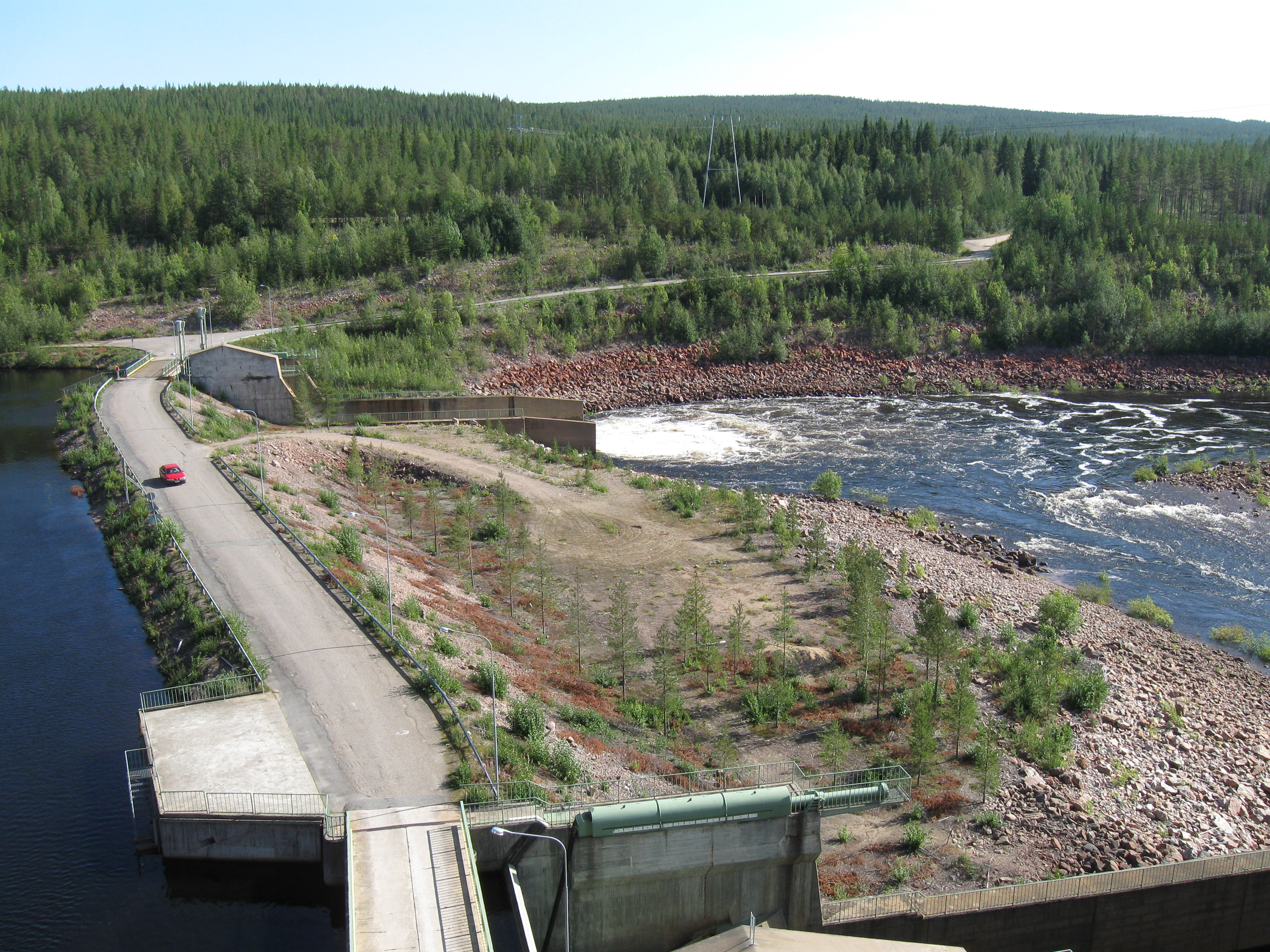
Pirttikoski

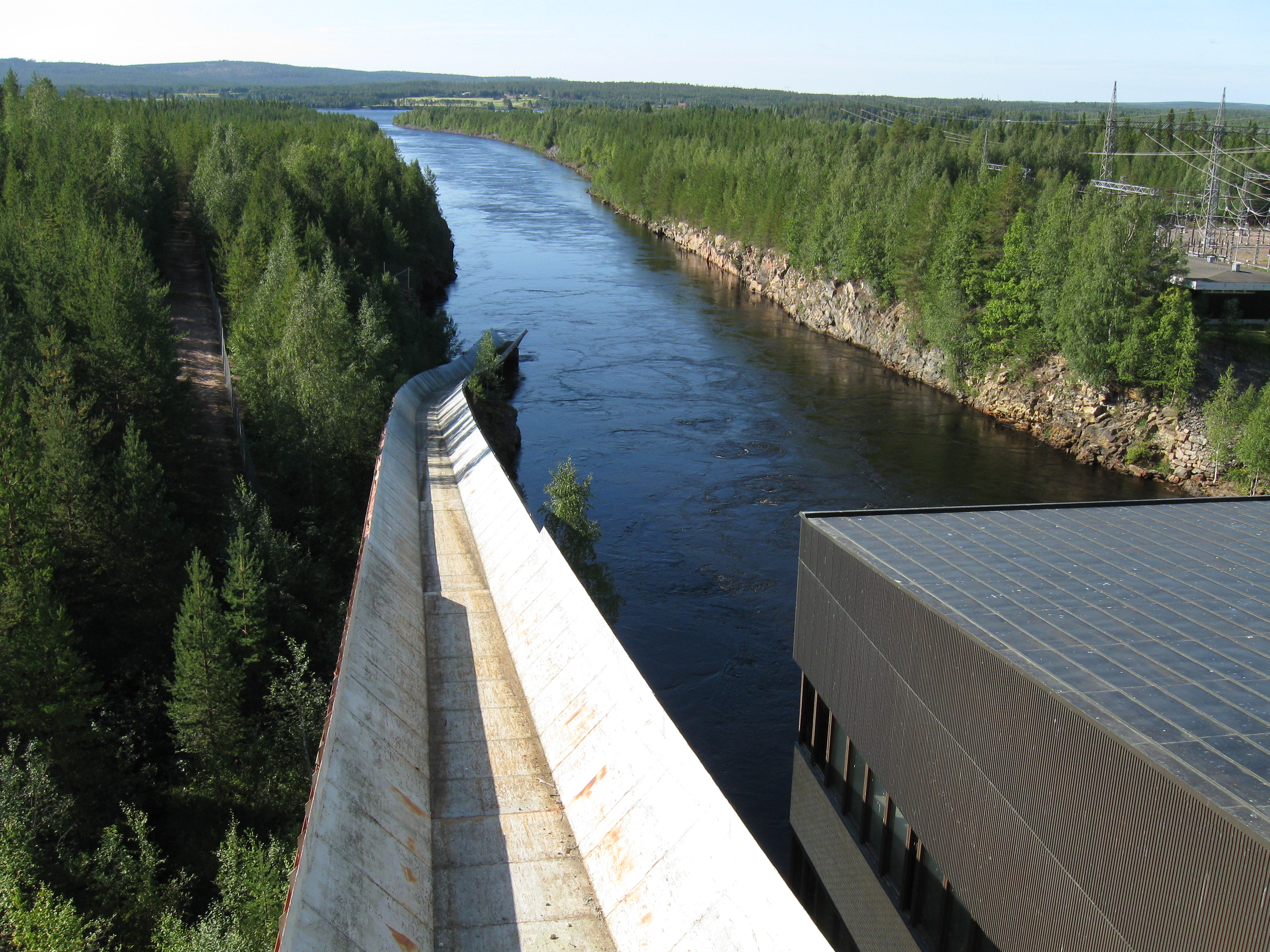
Seitakorva

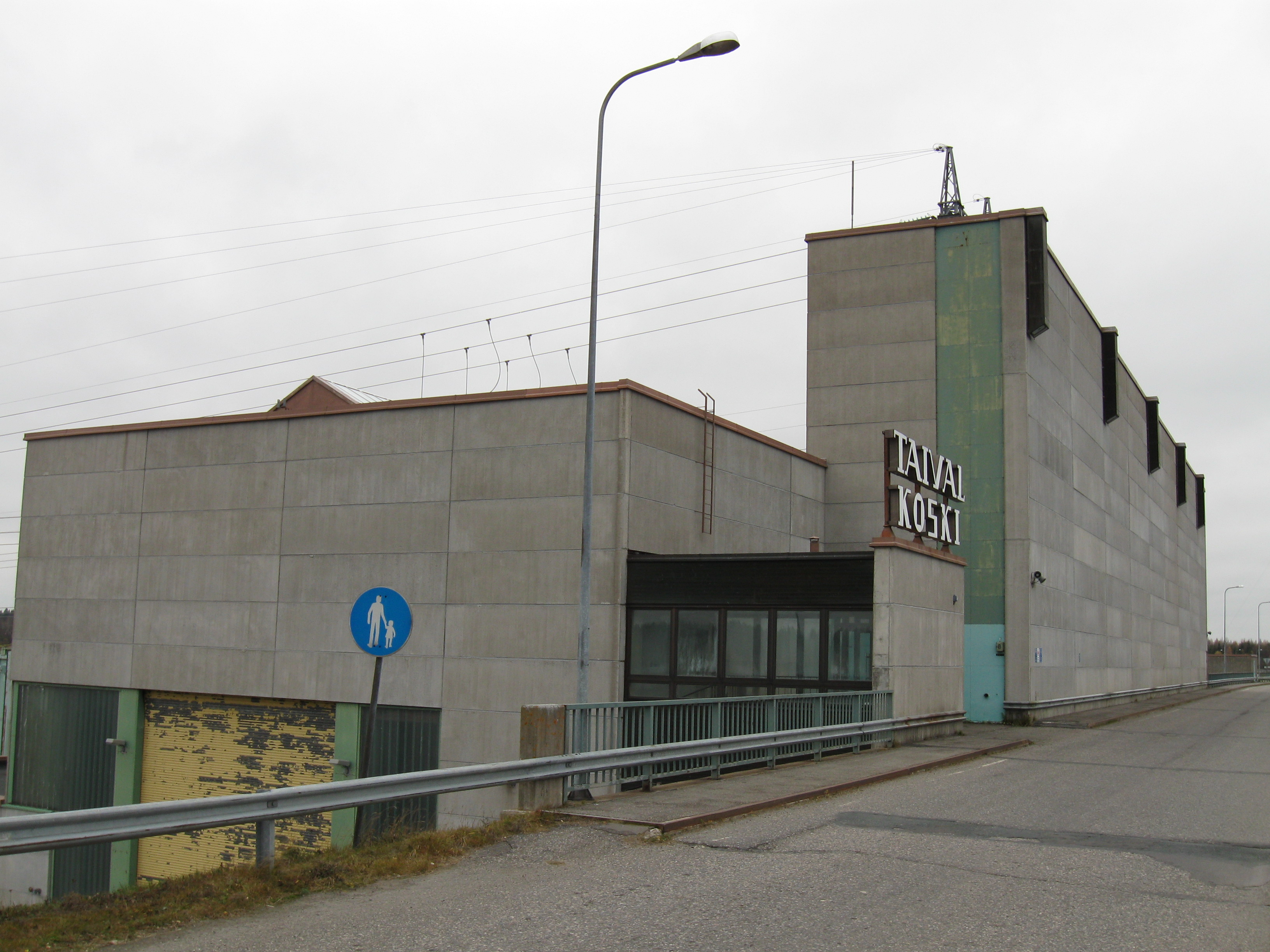
Taivalkoski

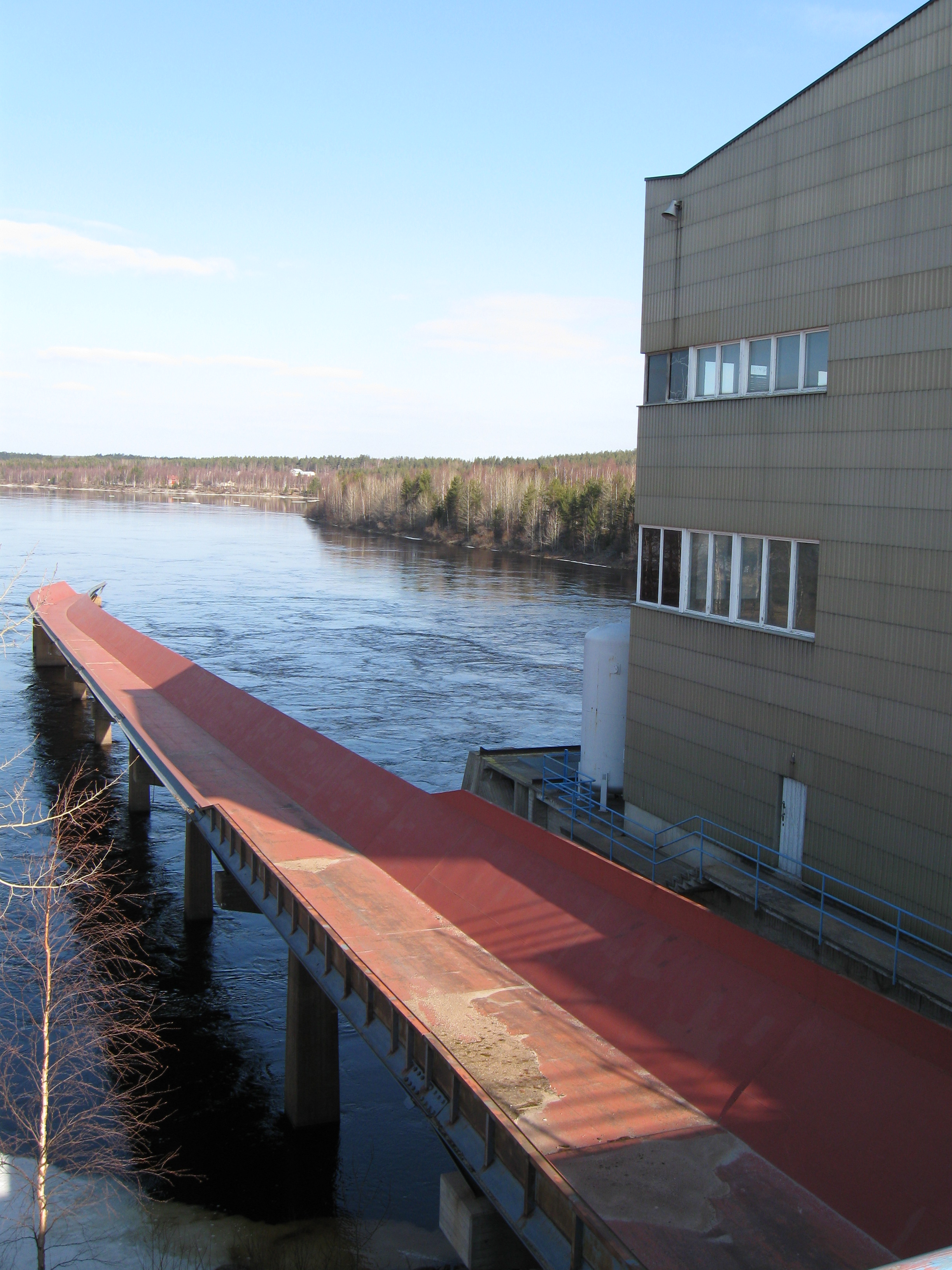
Valajaskoski

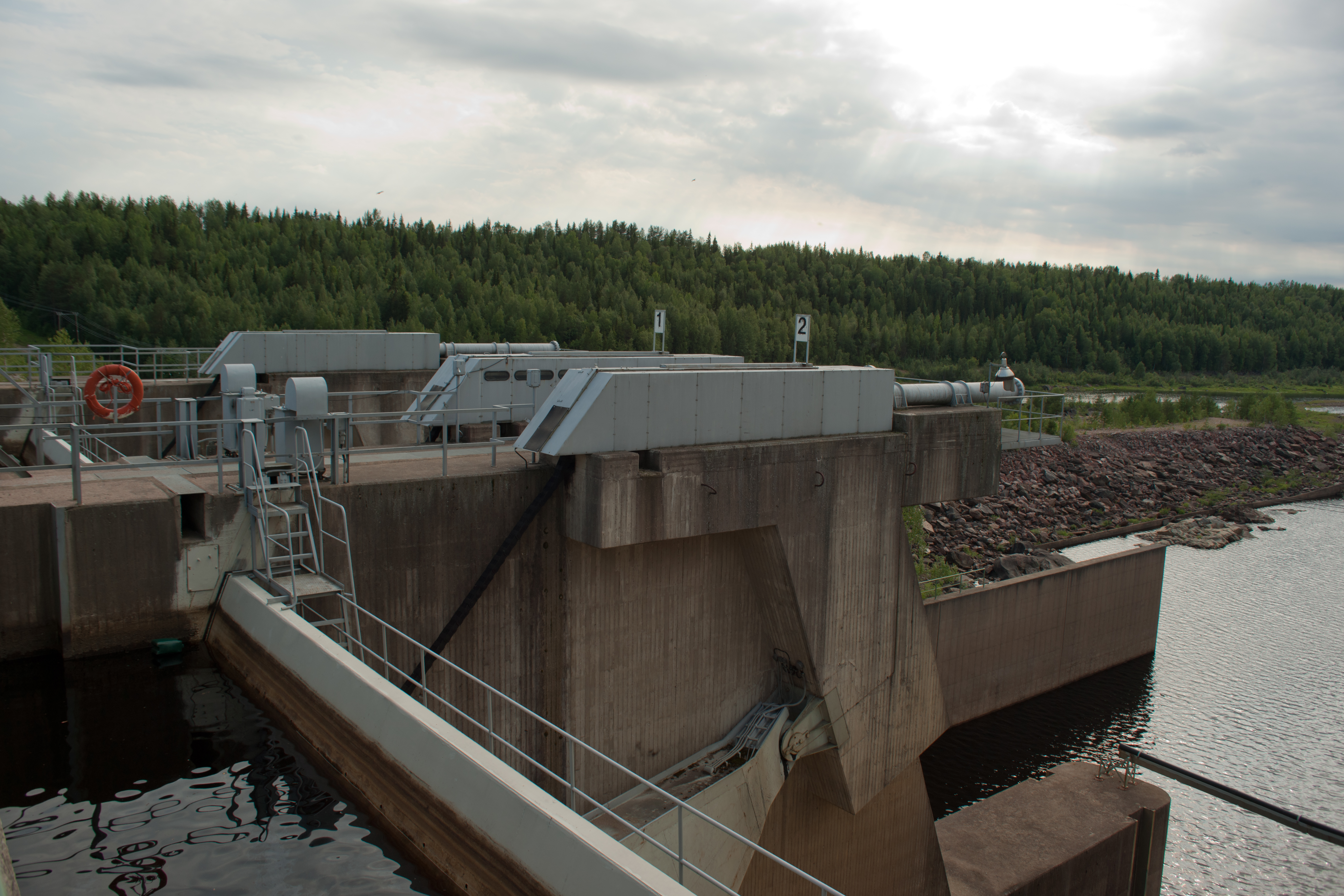
Vanttauskoski

== See also ==
- List of rivers of the Baltic Sea
- Rivers of Finland
