= Järvoja =

Stream in Estonia

Järvoja

Järvoja or Järveoja is a small stream (about 1.5 km in length and catchment area of about 5.5. km^{2}) in Lääne-Viru County, Estonia. It starts at the Rutja village, Haljala Parish and discharges into the Gulf of Finland, Baltic Sea by the Eisma village at the Karepa beach.

It is included into the Järveoja Conservation Area of the Järveoja Nature Reserve.
