= Swelinia =

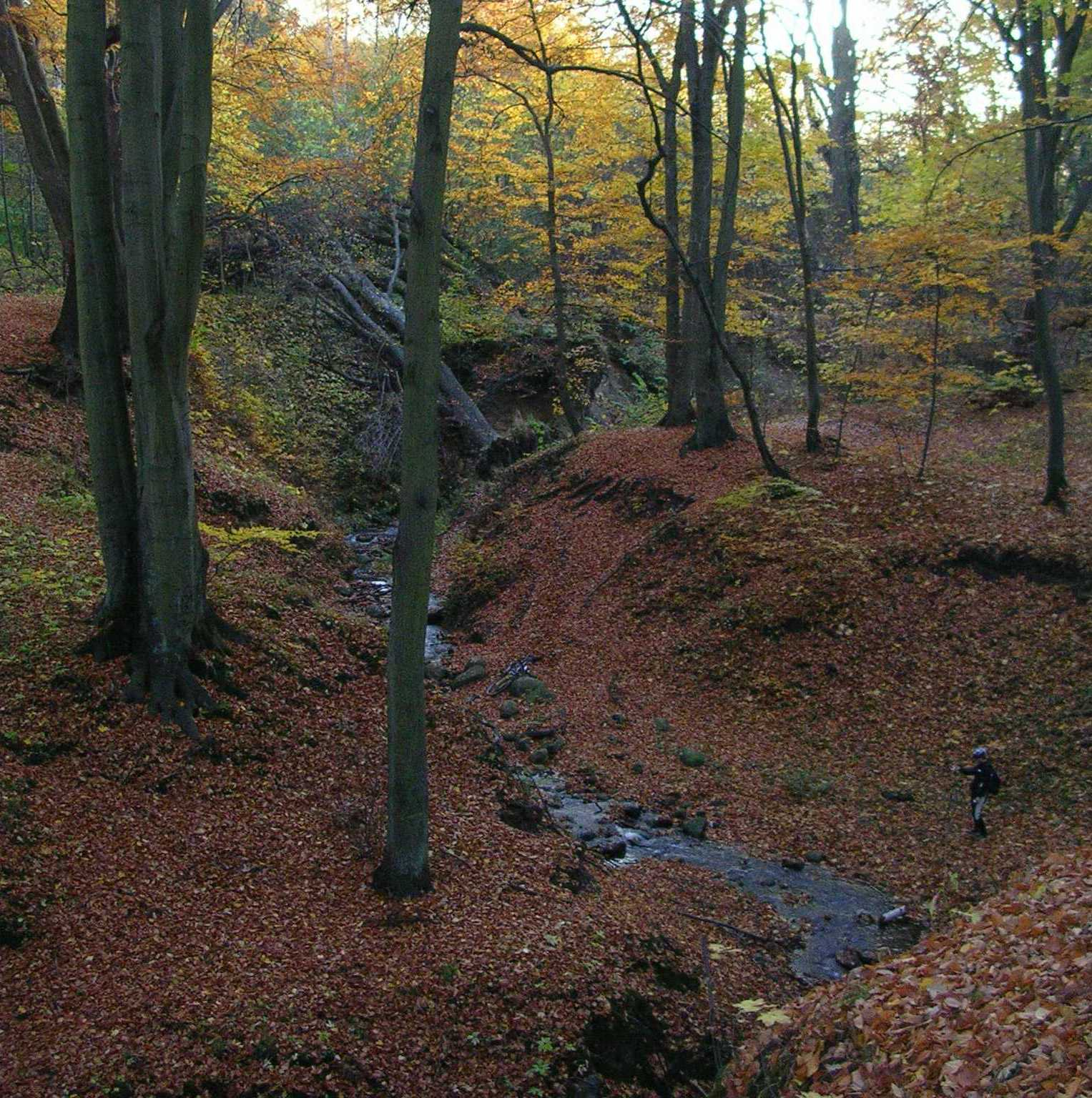

- Location of the mouth in Poland

Location
- Country: Poland
- Voivodeship: Pomeranian
- Cities: Gdynia, Sopot

Physical characteristics
- Source
  - coordinates: 54°27′45″N 18°31′50″E
- Mouth
  - location: Baltic Sea
  - coordinates: 54°27′50″N 18°33′42″E

Swelinia (Polish pronunciation: [svɛˈɭiːɲa]) or Swelina is a brook in northern Poland, located mostly between the cities of Gdynia and Sopot. It terminates into the Baltic Sea.

The original Slavic name Swelinia occurred first time in documents from 13th century (Rivulum qui Swelina dicitur, "a creek known as Swelina"), but subsequently that name was not used in any official documents or maps until it was mentioned again in the Geographic Dictionary of Kingdom of Poland in 1888.

The brook was always a border between Sopot and other territories. It was located within the Kingdom of Poland until the late 18th-century Partitions of Poland, when it was annexed by Prussia, and from 1871 it was also part of Germany. Following World War I, the Treaty of Versailles specified it (without mentioning its name, however), in the Section XI. and article 100, as a border between reborn Poland, which just regained independence, and the newly formed Free City of Danzig (Gdańsk). Following World War II, it was once again included in its entirety within the territory of Poland.
