= Narva-Jõesuu =

Town in Estonia

- Town
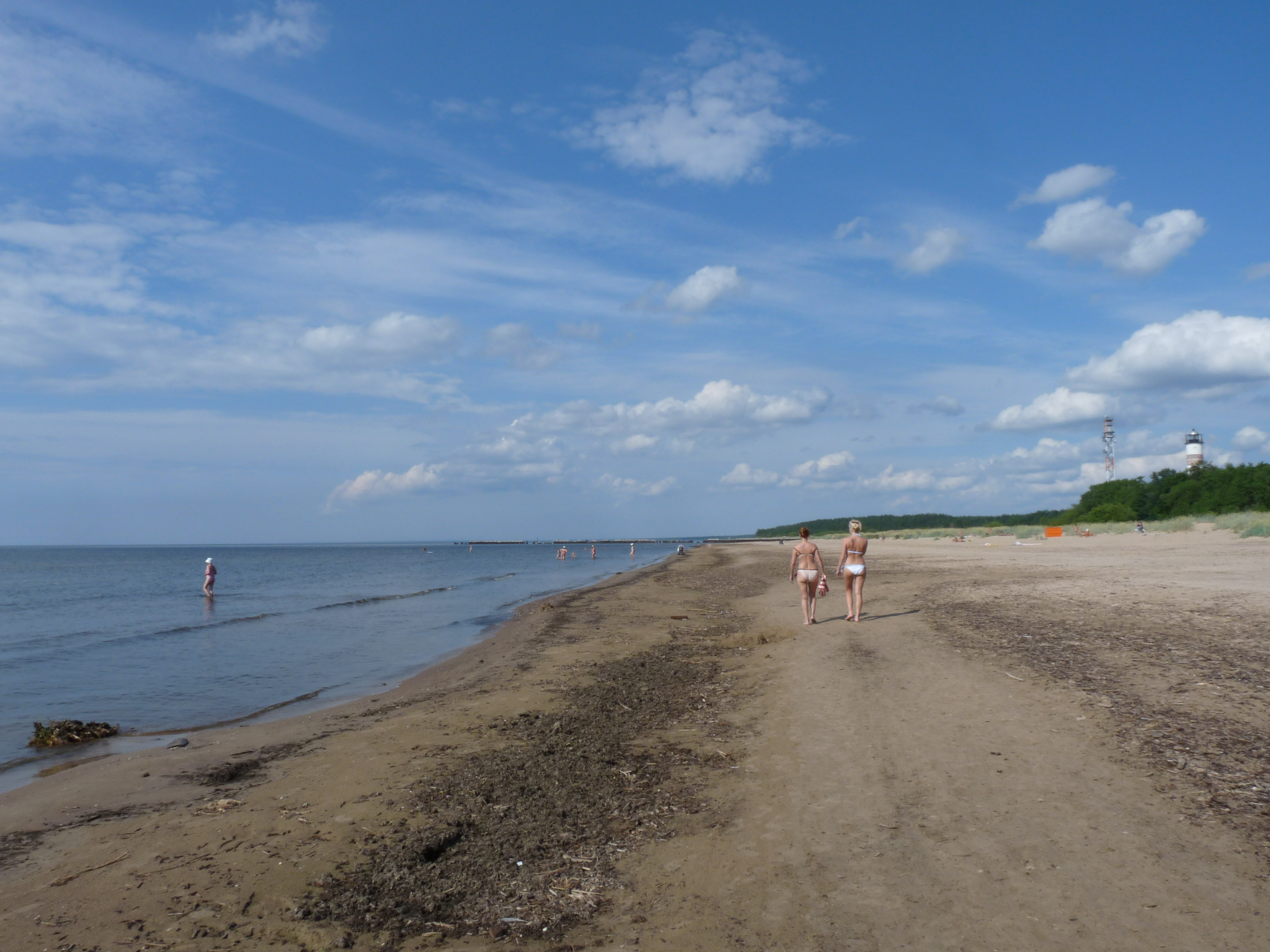
- Narva-Jõesuu beach

- Location in Estonia
- Coordinates: 59°27′32″N 28°02′26″E
- Country: Estonia
- County: Ida-Viru County
- Municipality: Narva-Jõesuu

Area
  - Total: 11.03 km^{2} (4.26 sq mi)

Population (2024)
  - Total: 2,602
  - Rank: 31st
  - Density: 235.9/km^{2} (611.0/sq mi)
- Time zone: UTC+2 (EET)
  - Summer (DST): UTC+3 (EEST)

Narva-Jõesuu (Note: Estonian pronunciation: [ˈnɑrʋɑ ˈjɤesuː]) (Note: Historical names include German: Hungerburg, Narwa-Mündung; and Russian: Усть-Нарва, Усть-Нарова.) is a seaside resort town in northeast Estonia. It is located by the Gulf of Finland of the Baltic Sea, on the west bank of the Narva River, which forms the Estonia–Russia international border.

Narva-Jõesuu marks the northeastern terminus of the E9 European Coastal Path, which runs for 5000 km (3125 miles) from Cabo de São Vicente in Portugal.

In the past, Narva-Jõesuu was administratively a district of the city of Narva and it officially became a separate town in 1993. It has a population of 2,681 (as of 1 January 2020). As of 2026, the estimated population of Narva-Jõesuu is 2,582 residents.

== History ==
The town's historical name variants in both Estonian (Narva jõe-suu) and Russian (Усть-Нарова, Ust'-Narova) literally mean 'mouth of Narva river'.

The place was first documented in a 1503 deed issued by Master of the Livonian Order Wolter von Plettenberg and was the site of an outer harbour of the city of Narva from the 16th century, containing several timber stockyards, sawmills, and small shipbuilding industry.

The Narva-Jõesuu Lighthouse was erected in 1808.

Thanks to its nearly 8-kilometer (5.0 mi)-long white sand beach lined with pine trees – considered one of the finest in Estonia – Narva-Jõesuu has long been a popular summer destination. In the late 19th and early 20th century it was a spa town frequented by the nobility from Saint Petersburg, which is less than 150 km (93 mi) to the east, and from Moscow. During the Soviet period, it was visited in large numbers by residents of Saint Petersburg (then Leningrad), particularly the Soviet "apparatchiks" and intelligentsia, many of whom built a dacha (Russian: 'summer house') in Narva-Jõesuu or on the outskirts.

The borough (alev) of Narva-Jõesuu was established in 1917. In June 1920, some nearby villages were merged into it, including Kudruküla and Magerburg, the latter located on the opposite bank of the Narva. Narva-Jõesuu lost the status of borough on 1 April 1934, when it became a district of Narva, but regained the status in 1945.

In the 1990s, after the restoration of Estonia's independence, Narva-Jõesuu saw few foreign visitors from Russia or elsewhere, and as a result, many hotels and guest houses went out of business. In the 21st century, the town's resort facilities have been renovated, and the number of tourists has an upward trend. However, the number of hotels is still considerably lower compared to the late 1980s.

== Demographics ==
Narva-Jõesuu has a population of 2,681 (as of 1 January 2020). As in the nearby city of Narva, most residents today are Russian or Russian-speaking, although the percentage of native Estonians is slightly higher in Narva-Jõesuu (13% compared to 4% in Narva).

== Gallery ==
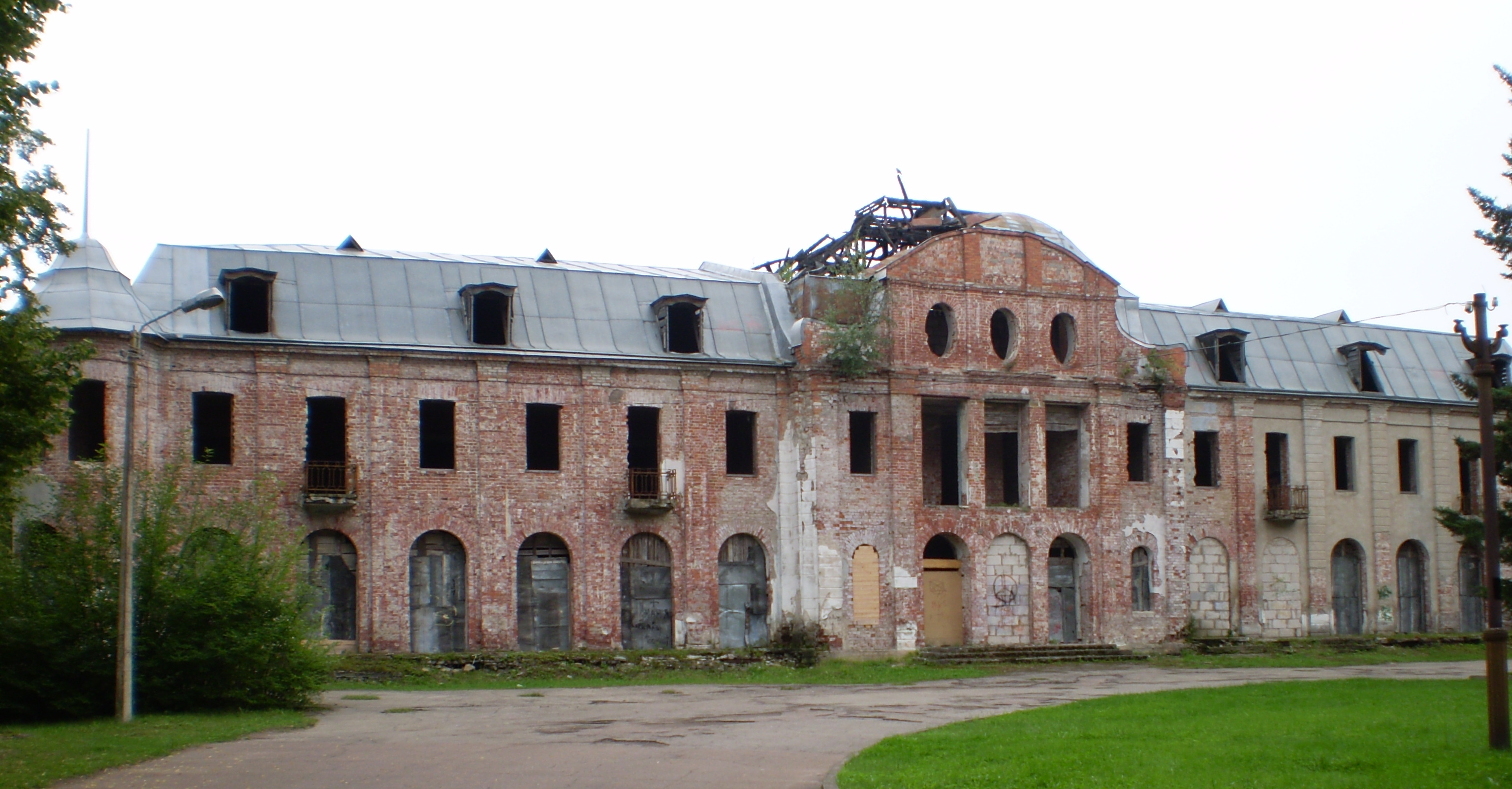
Ruins of Narva-Jõesuu kuursaal (resort hall)

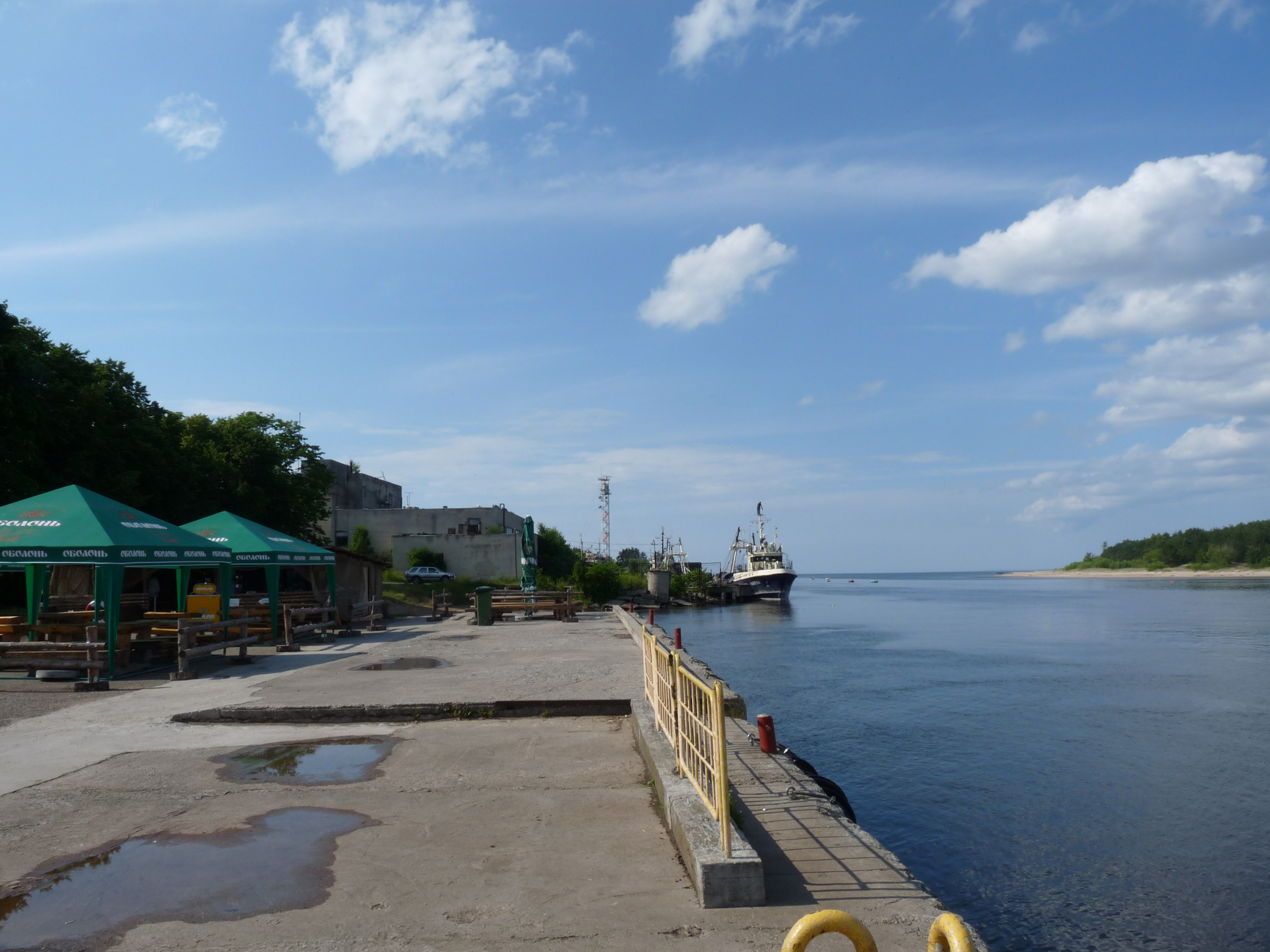
Pier in the mouth of Narva River

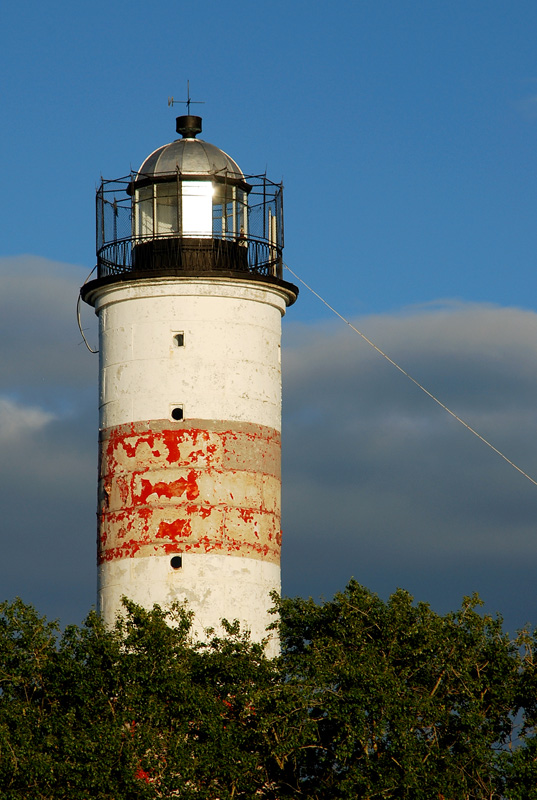
Narva-Jõesuu Lighthouse

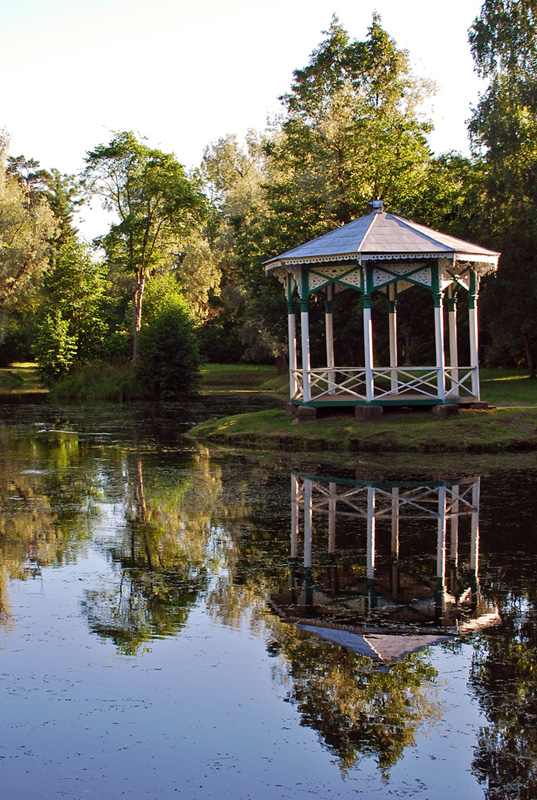
Park in the town centre

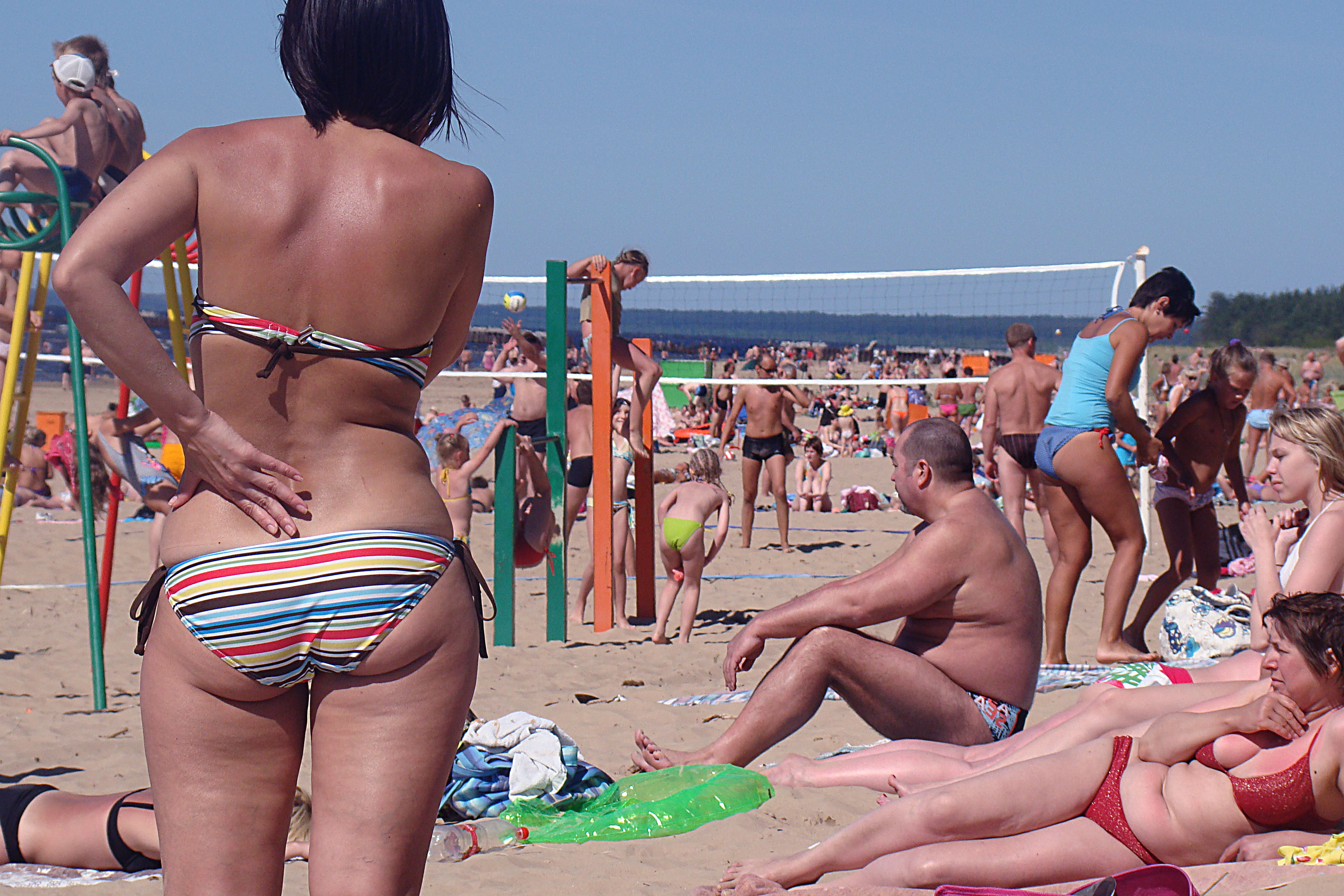
Beach life

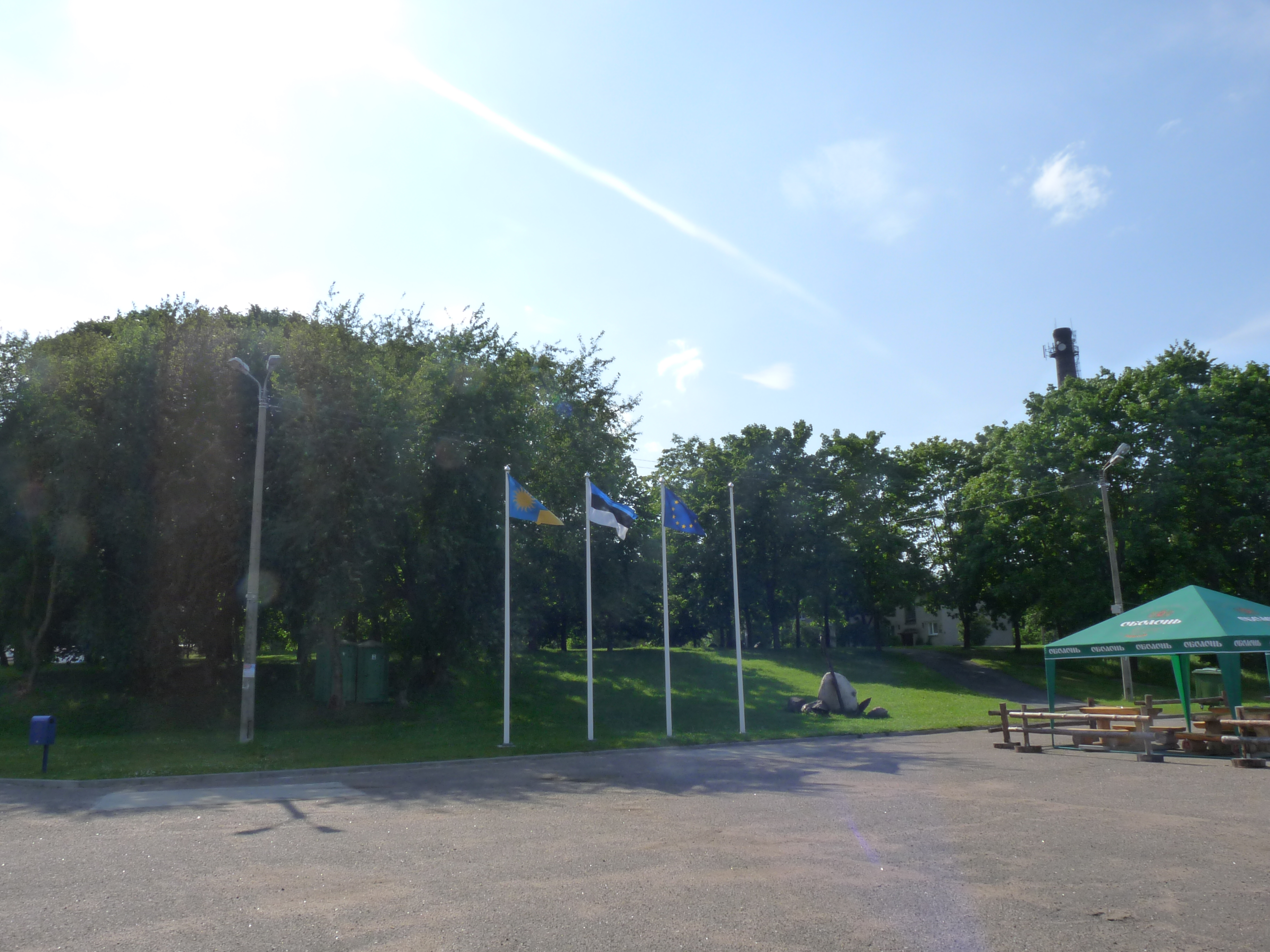
Bank of Narva river in Narva-Jõesuu

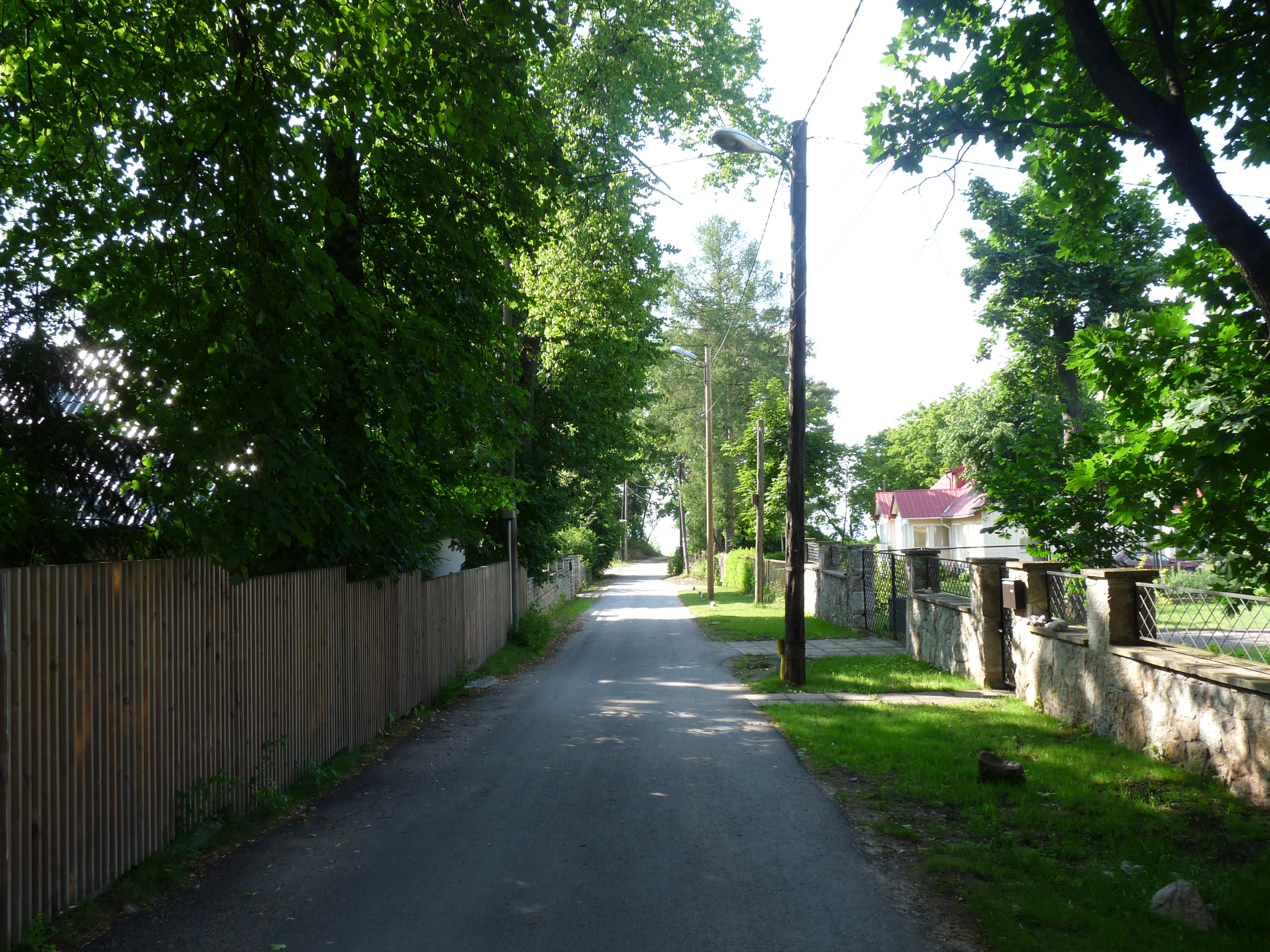
A street
