= Jõesuu, Harju County =

Village in Estonia

Jõesuu
- Village
- Location within Estonia
- Coordinates: 59°28′18″N 25°09′11″E
- Country: Estonia
- County: Harju County
- Parish: Jõelähtme Parish
- Time zone: UTC+2 (EET)
  - Summer (DST): UTC+3 (EEST)

Jõesuu is a village in Jõelähtme Parish, Harju County in northern Estonia. It is located on the around the mouth of the Jägala River to the Ihasalu Bay (part of the Gulf of Finland), north of Jägala Falls.

== Gallery ==
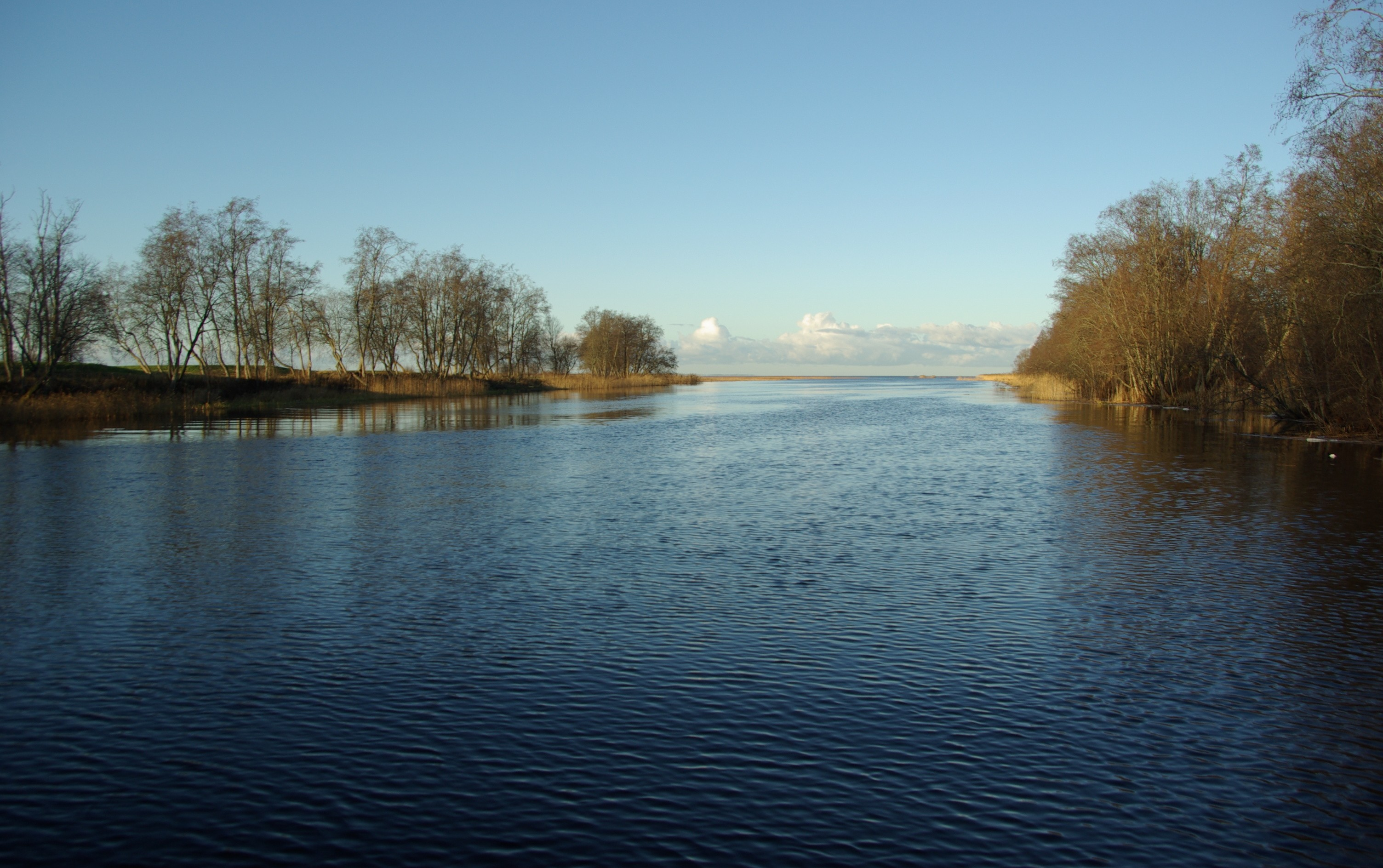
The mouth of Jägala River

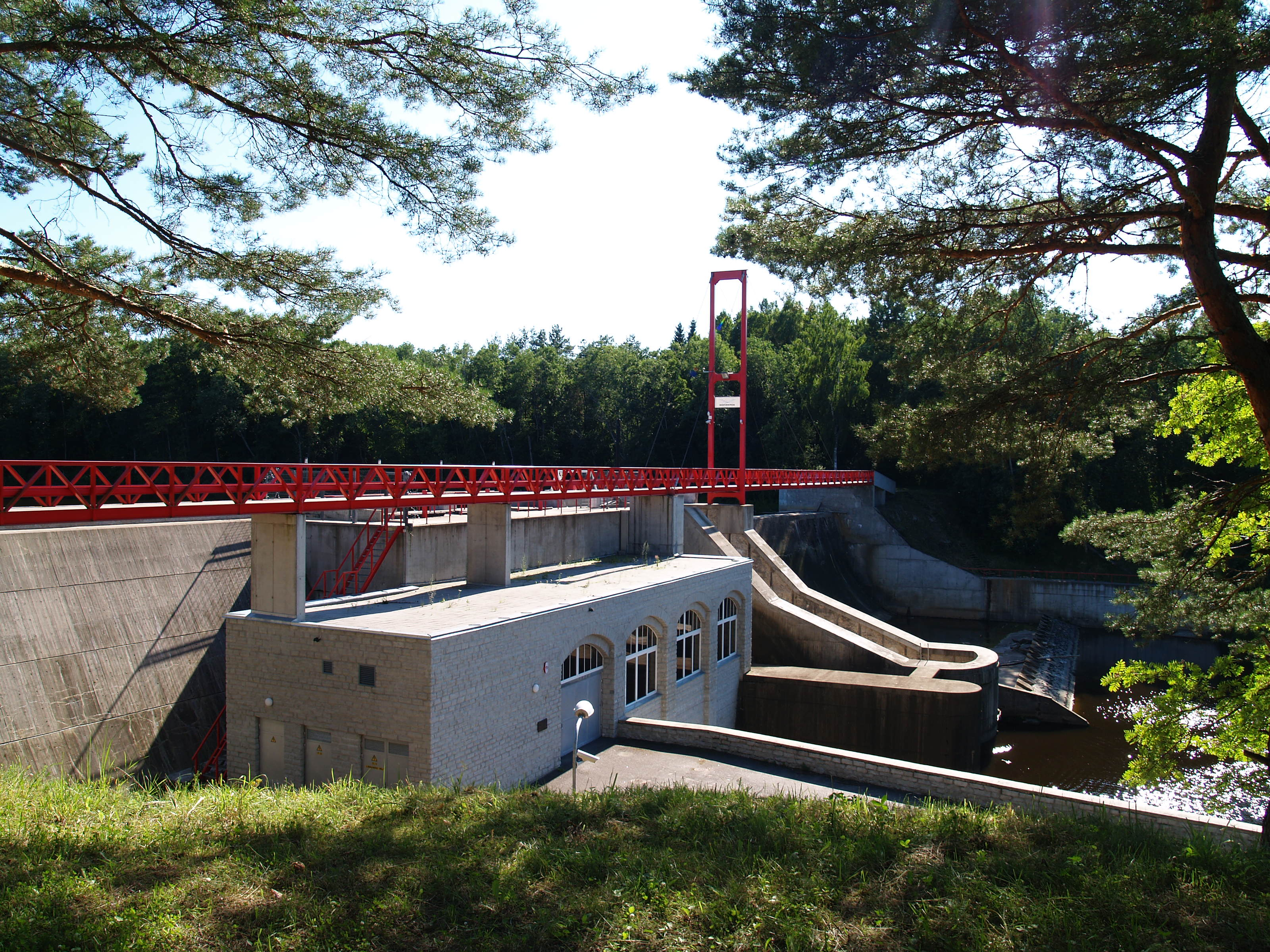
Linnamäe hydroelectric power station on Jägala River

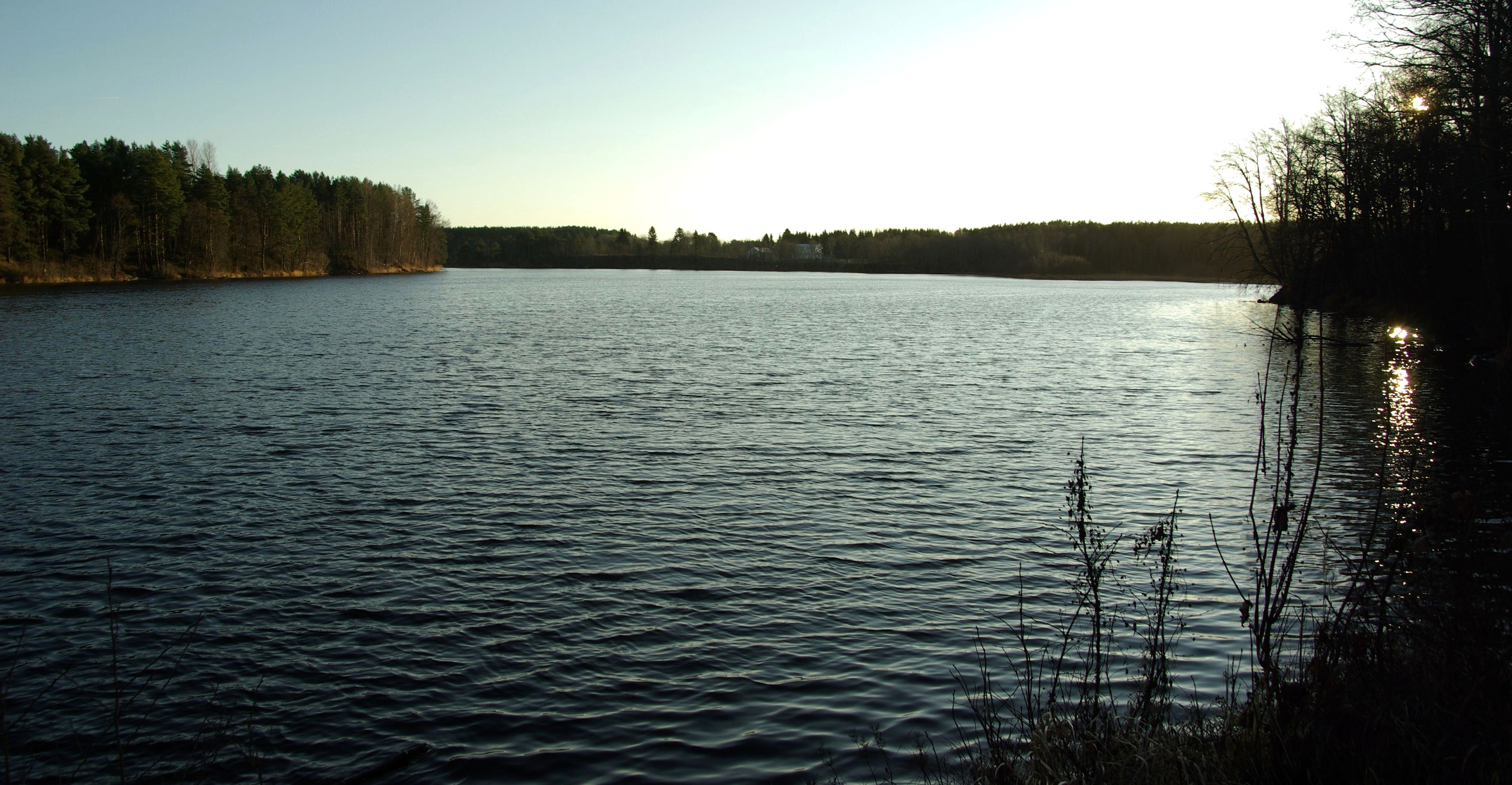
Linnamäe impounded lake
