= Kiesimä =

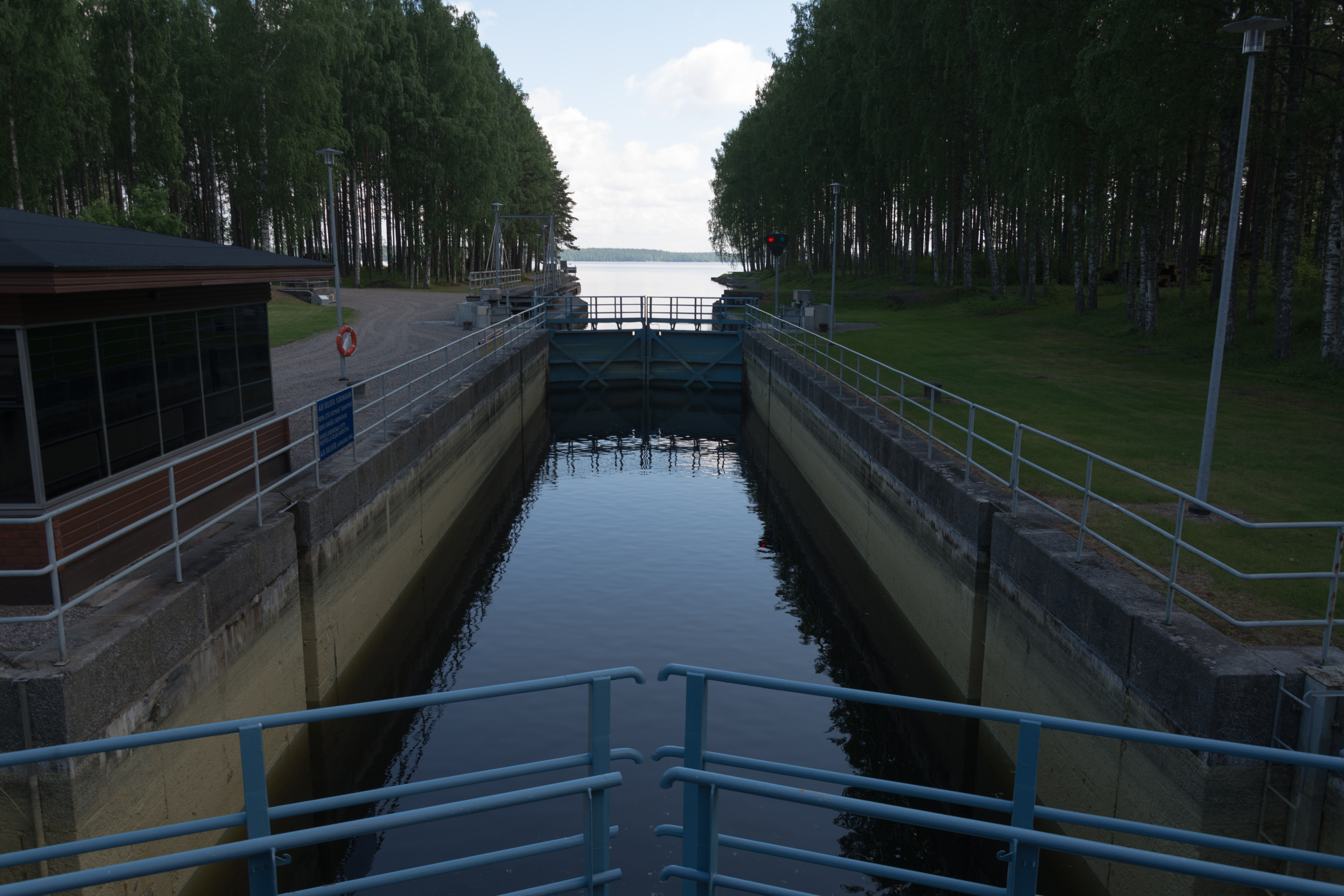
- Kiesimä channel in 2013

- Location within Finland
- Location: Rautalampi
- Coordinates: 62°46′N 26°35′E
- Type: Lake
- Catchment area: Kymijoki
- Basin countries: Finland
- Surface area: 11.113 km^{2} (4.291 sq mi)
- Average depth: 7.63 m (25.0 ft)
- Max. depth: 31.69 m (104.0 ft)
- Water volume: 0.0848 km^{3} (68,700 acre⋅ft)
- Shore length^{1}: 44.56 km (27.69 mi)
- Surface elevation: 100.9 m (331 ft)
- Frozen: December–April
- ^{1} Shore length is not a well-defined measure.

Kiesimä is a medium-sized lake of Finland. It belongs in the Kymijoki main catchment area. It is located in the region Pohjois-Savo. The Kiesimä Canal connects the lake westwards to the lake Konnevesi and the Kerkonkoski Canal connects it eastwards to the lake Niinivesi.

== See also ==
- List of lakes in Finland
