= Niinivesi =

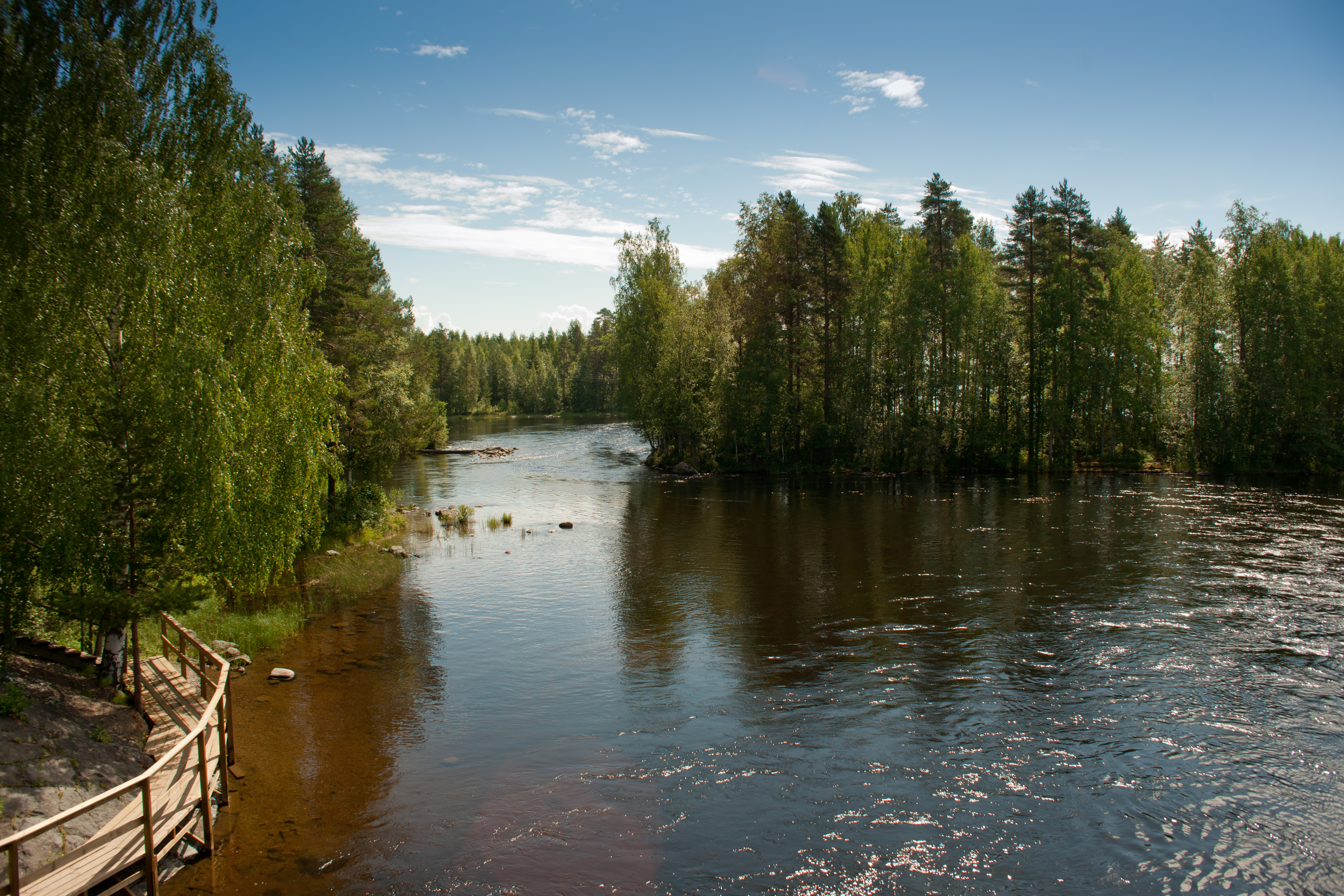

- Location within Finland
- Location: Rautalampi, Tervo, Vesanto
- Coordinates: 62.79703°N 26.74919°E
- Type: Lake
- Primary outflows: Nokisenkoski rapids
- Catchment area: Kymijoki
- Basin countries: Finland
- Max. length: 35 km (22 mi)
- Surface area: 75.66 km^{2} (29.21 sq mi)
- Max. depth: 19.22 m (63.1 ft)
- Shore length^{1}: 196.31 km (121.98 mi)
- Surface elevation: 97.9 m (321 ft)
- Frozen: December–April
- Islands: Kotasaari, Papinsaari
- ^{1} Shore length is not a well-defined measure.

Niinivesi is a medium-sized lake of Finland within the Kymijoki main catchment area. The lake is situated in the municipalities of Rautalampi, Tervo and Vesanto. Niinivesi is almost divided into a northern and southern part. The northern part is 20 kilometers long, resembling a narrow bay. The southern part is connected westwards to the lake Kiesimä via the Kerkonkoski Canal. The water quality in the lake is excellent and clear.

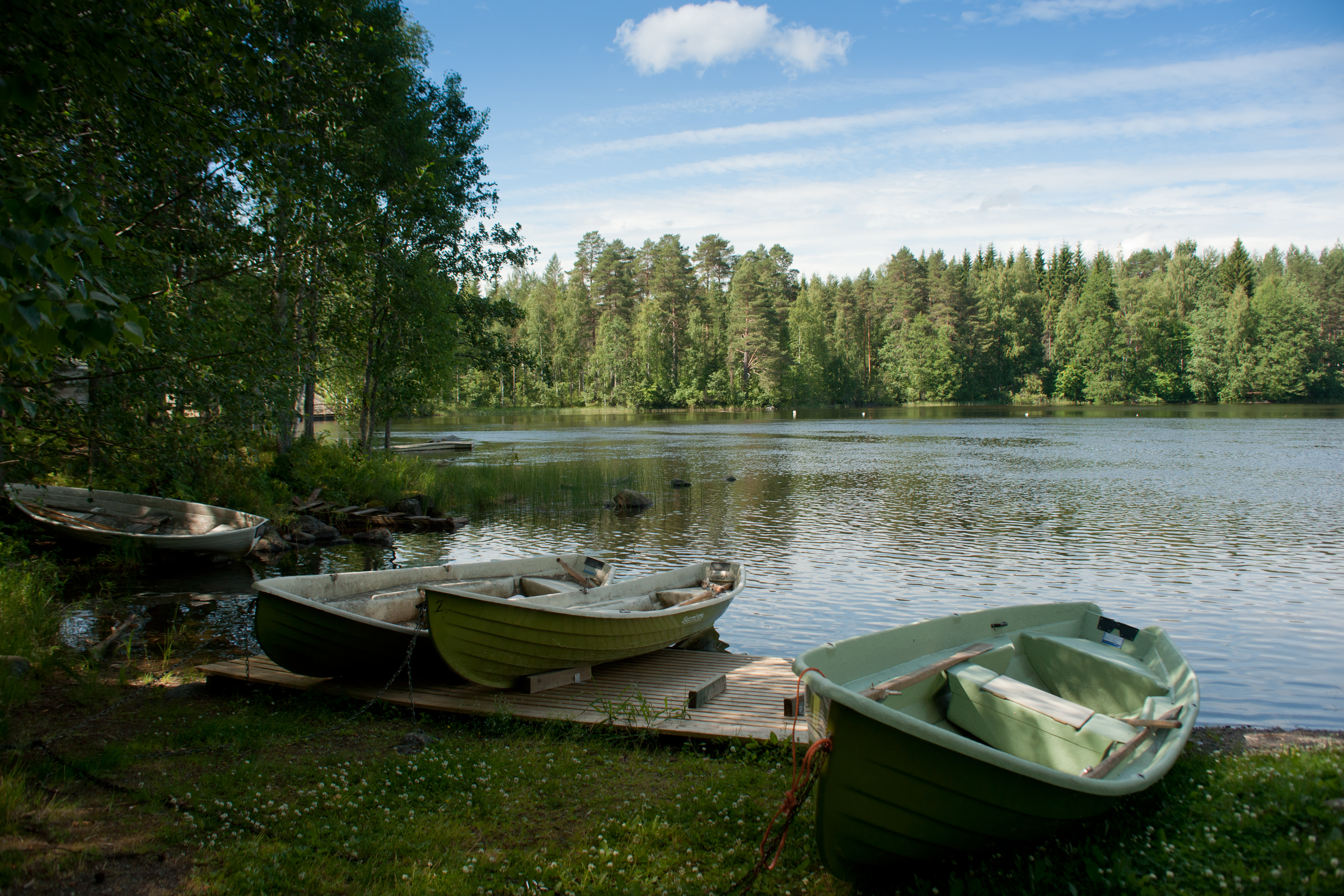

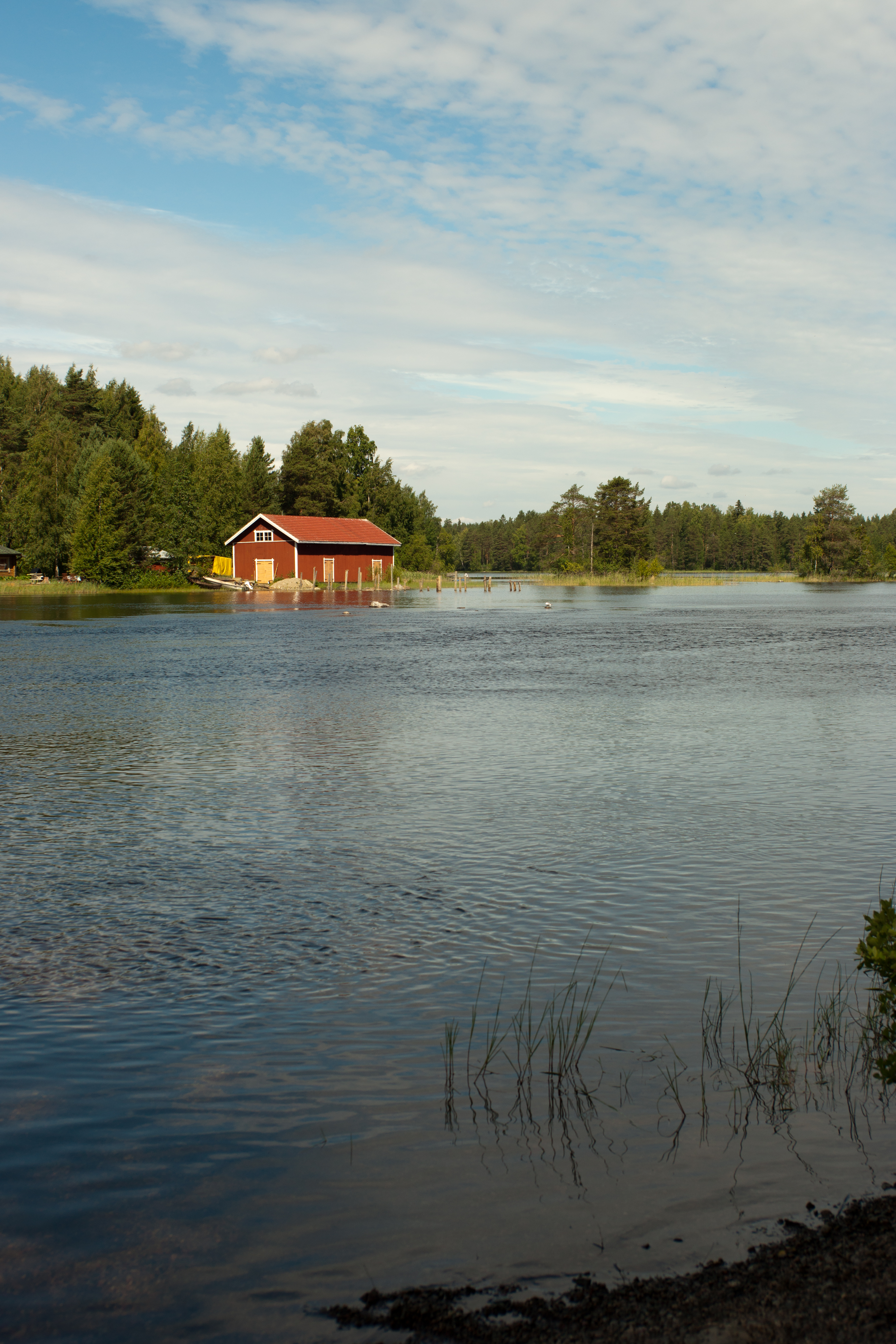

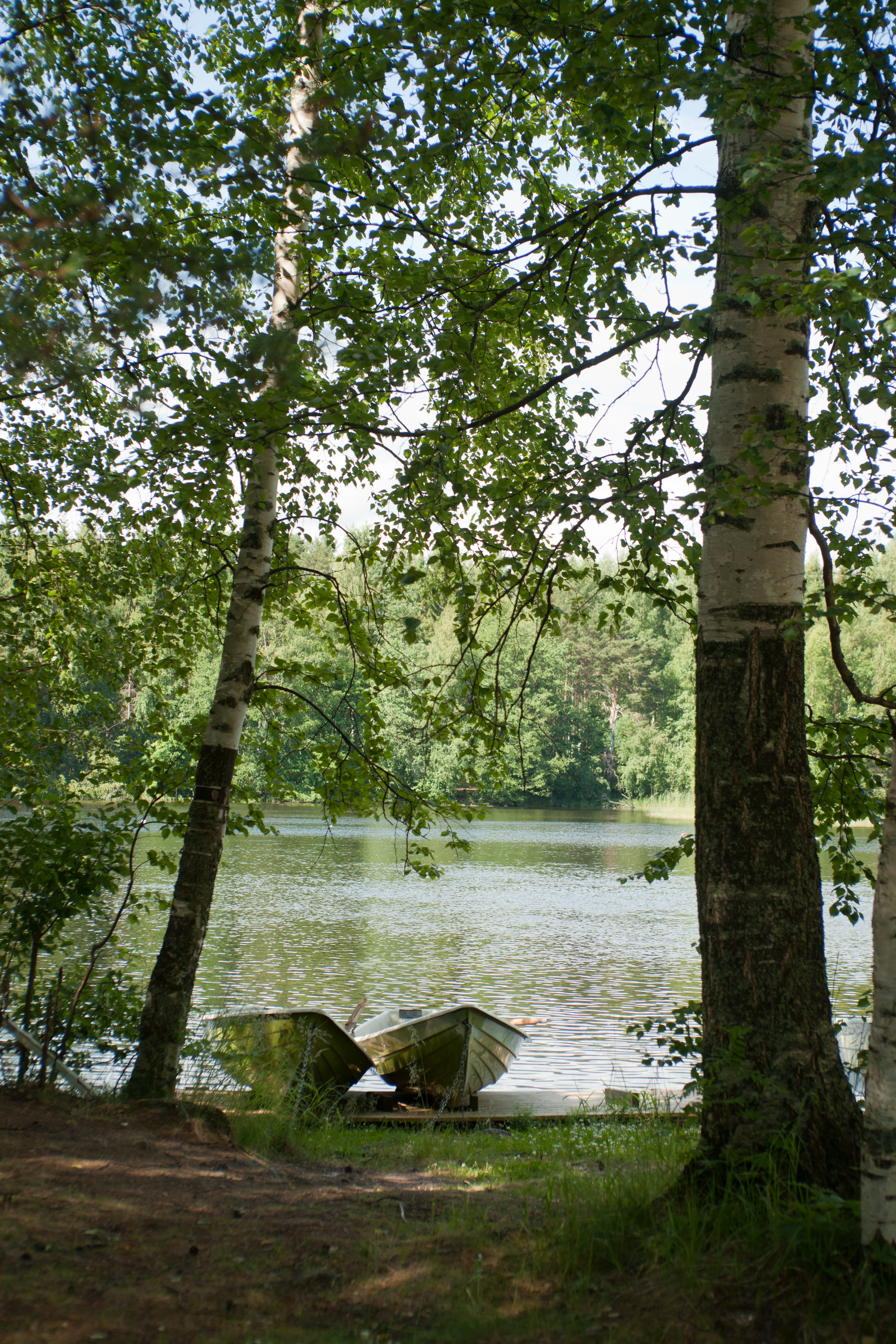

== See also ==
- List of lakes in Finland
